= List of other classes of keelboats and yachts (M–Z) =

The following is a partial list of keelboats and yacht types and sailing classes.

== Keelboats and yachts ==
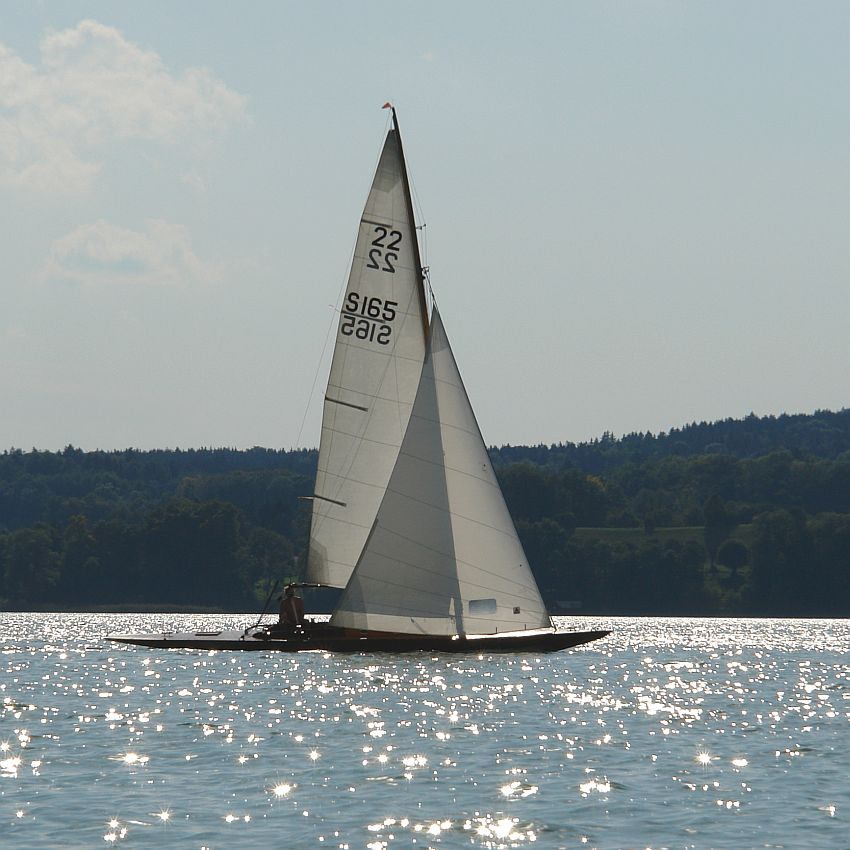
22 m^{2} Skerry cruiser

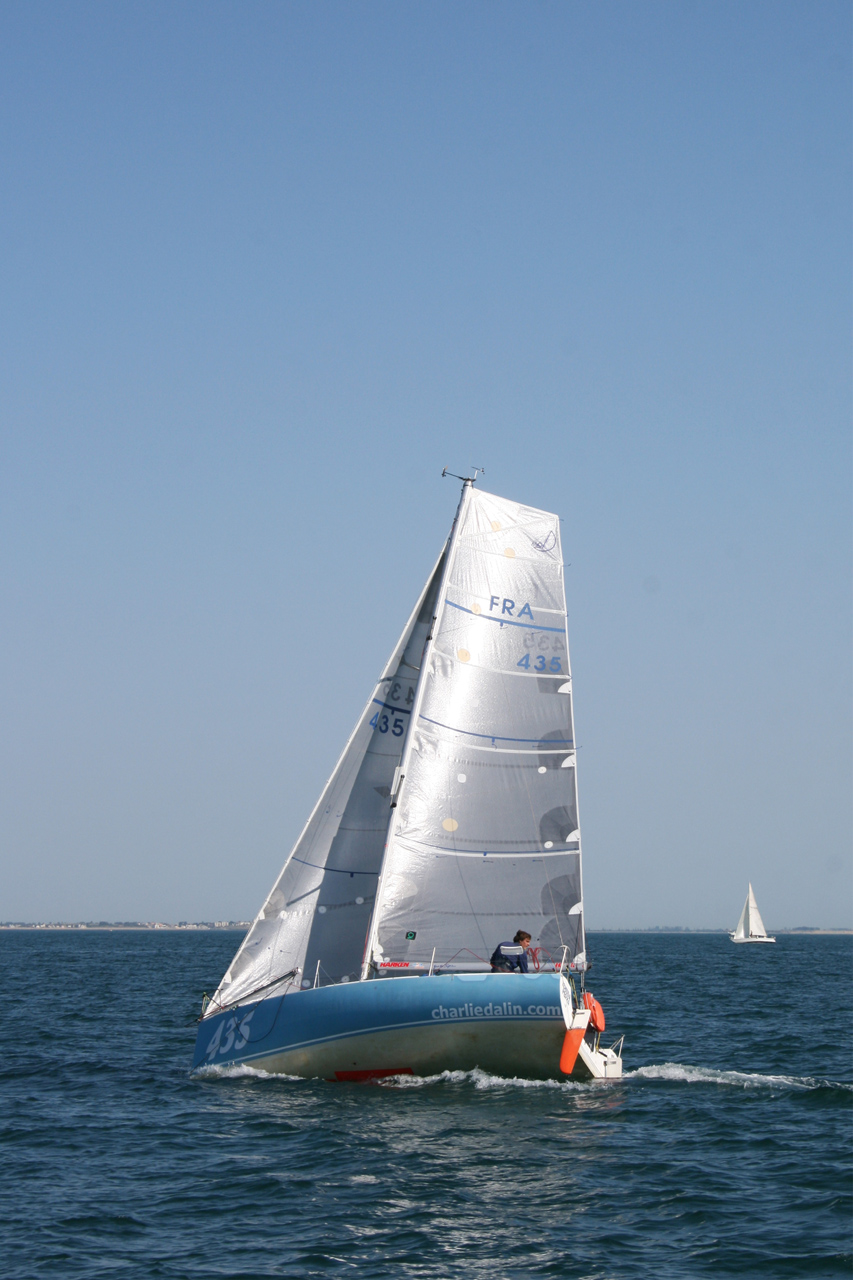
Classe Mini

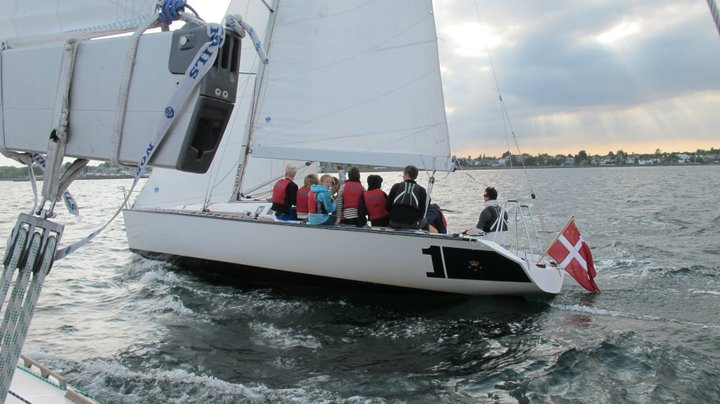
DS 37 Match Racer

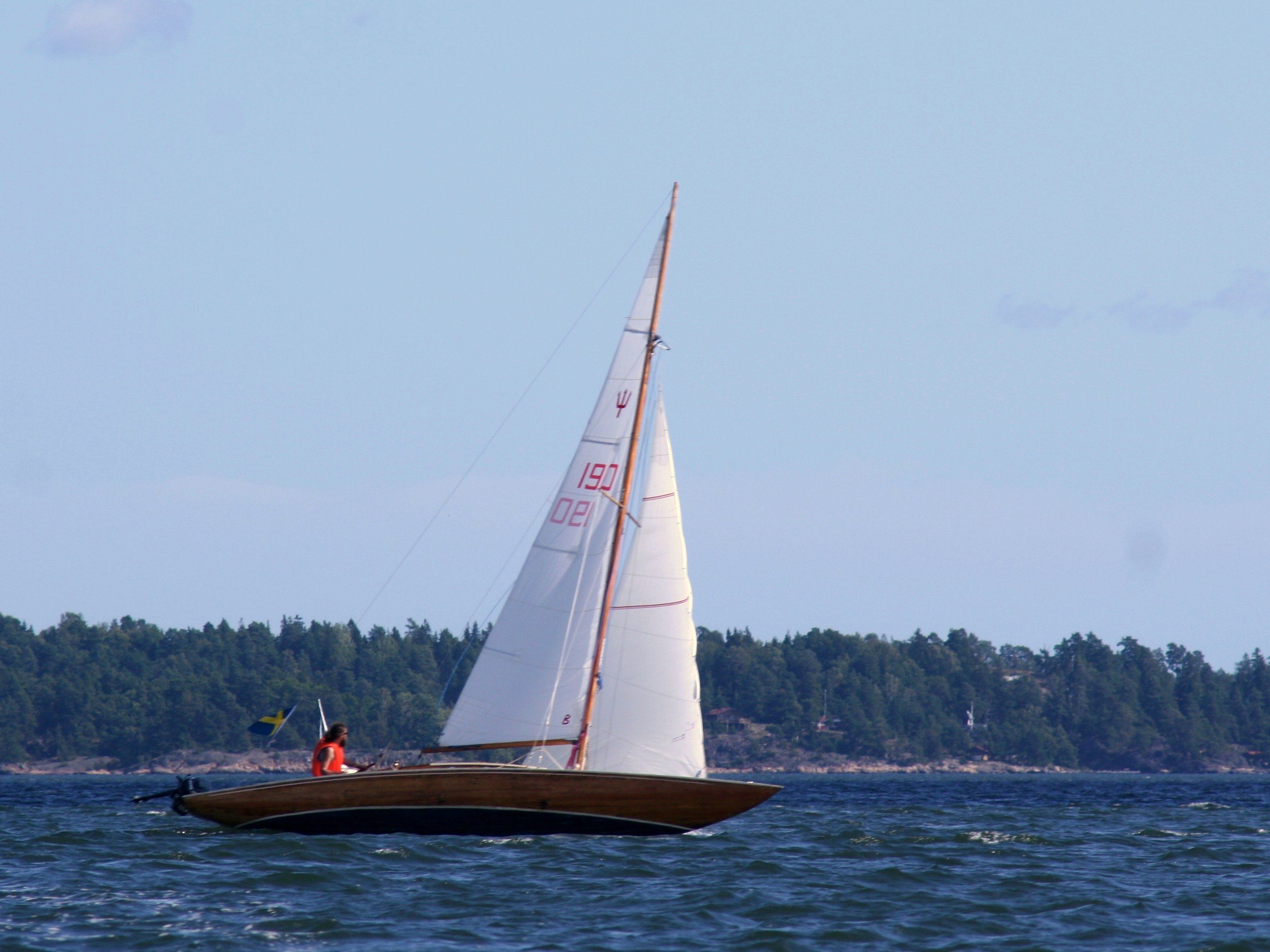
Neptunkryssare

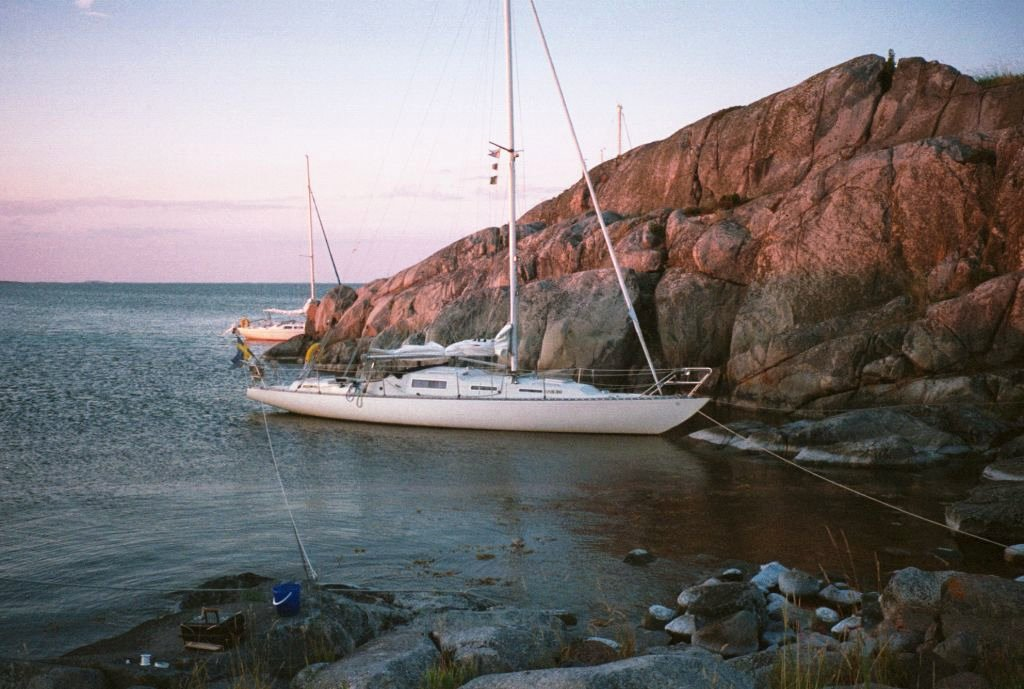
S 30

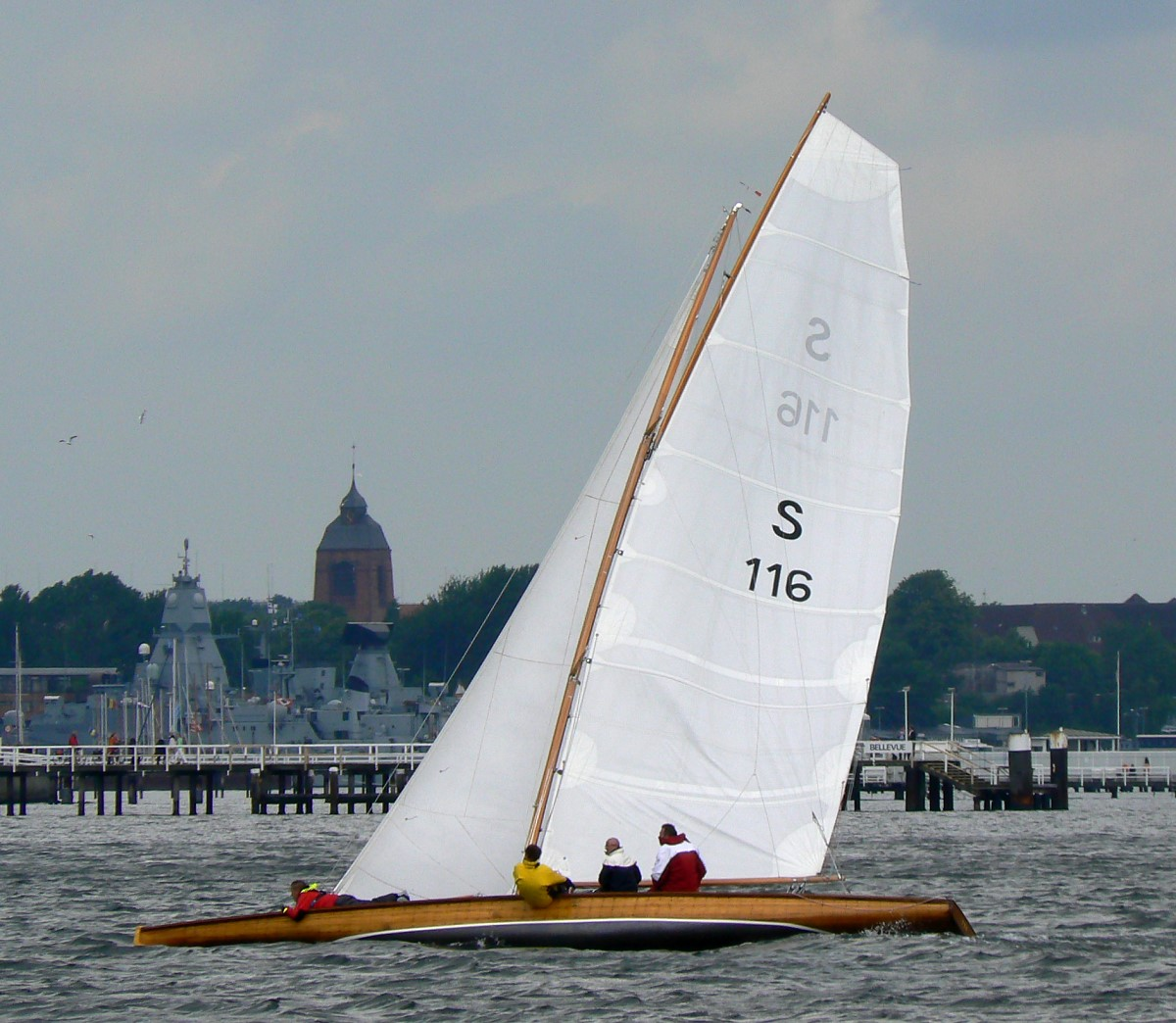
Sonderklasse

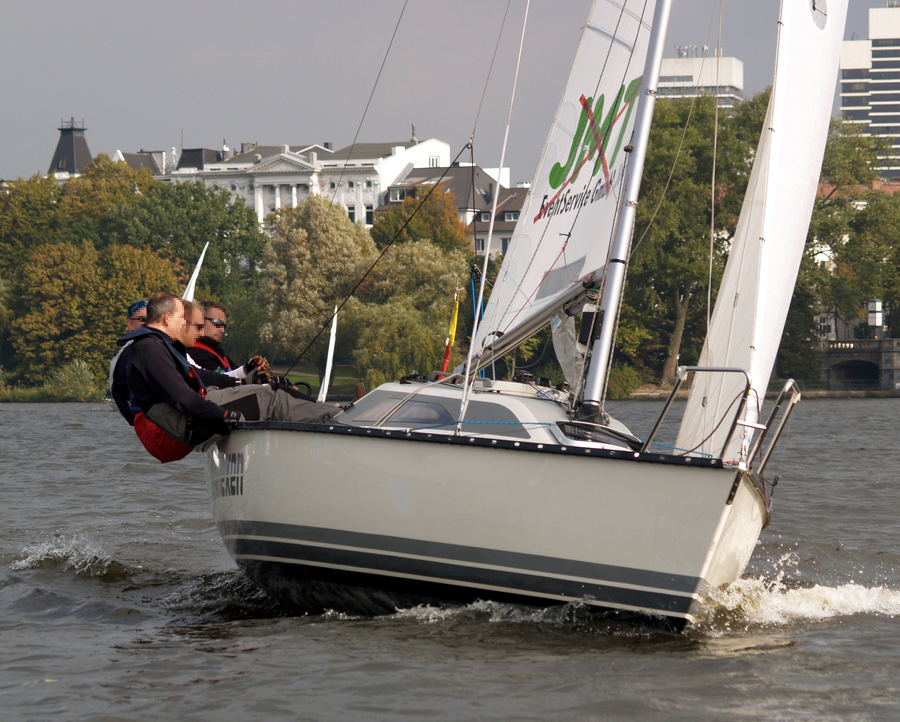
X-79

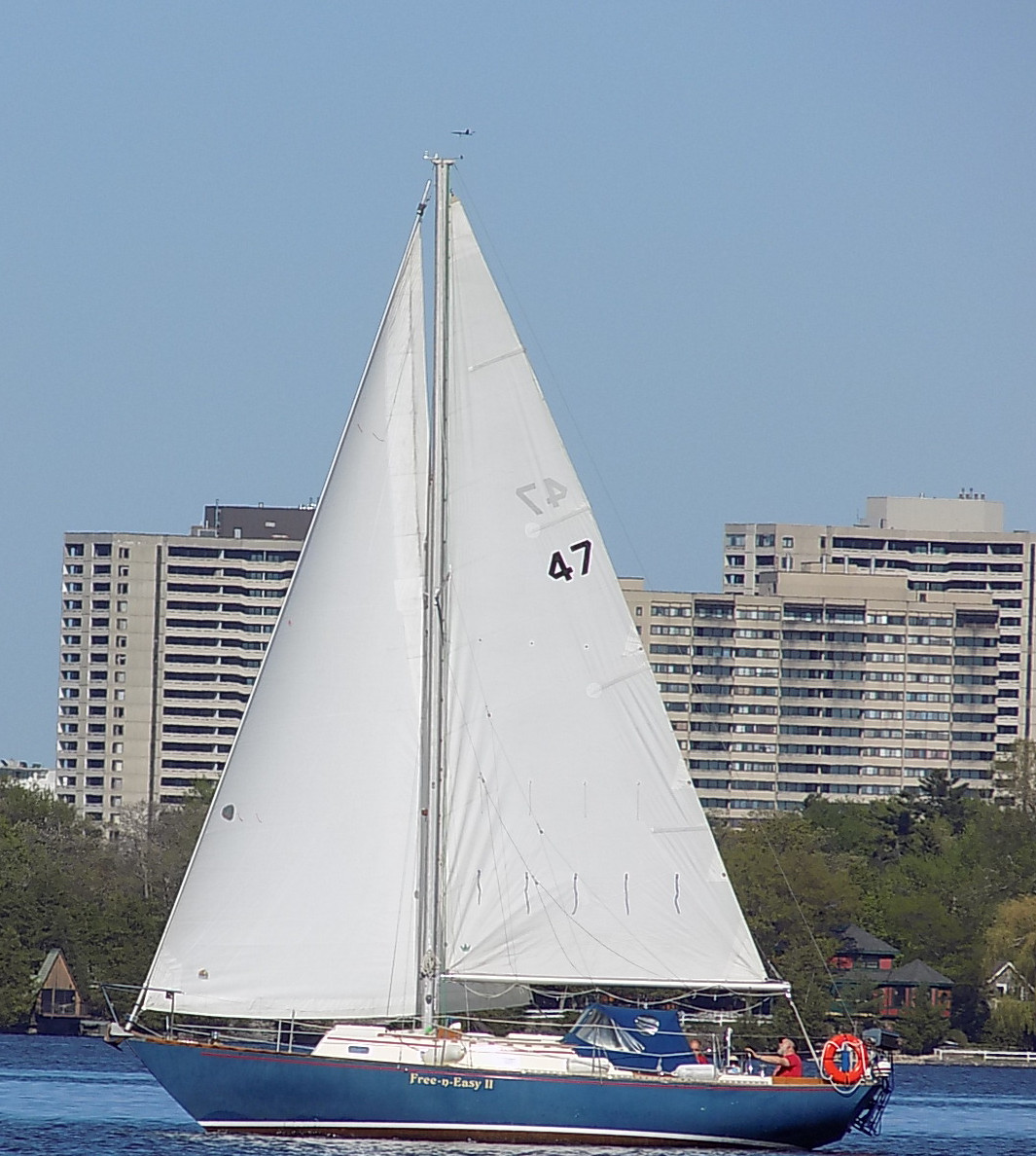
Corvette 31

Name	Year of first construction	Designer	Builder	Fleets	Ref
M34	2010	Joubert/Nivelt/Mercier	Archambault Boats		
MacGregor 19	1992	Roger MacGregor	MacGregor Yacht Corporation		
MacGregor 21	1980	Roger MacGregor	MacGregor Yacht Corporation		
MacGregor 22	1967	Roger MacGregor	MacGregor Yacht Corporation		
MacGregor 24	1971	Roger MacGregor	MacGregor Yacht Corporation		
MacGregor 25	1973	Roger MacGregor	MacGregor Yacht Corporation		
MacGregor 26	1986	Roger MacGregor	MacGregor Yacht Corporation		
Mälar 15	1950	Oscar Schelin		Sweden	
Mälar 22	1929	Gustaf Estlander		Sweden	
Mälar 25	1948	Erik Nilsson		Sweden	
Mälar 30	1933	Lage Eklund		Sweden	
Maple Leaf 42	1976	Stan Huntingford	Cooper Enterprises		
Maple Leaf 45	1985	Stan Huntingford	Cooper Enterprises		
Maple Leaf 48	1972	Stan Huntingford	Cooper Enterprises		
Maple Leaf 54	1978	Stan Huntingford	Cooper Enterprises		
Mariner 19	1962	Philip Rhodes	O'Day Corporation; Rebel Industries; Stuart Marine		
Mariah 27	1986	Graham & Schlageter			
Mark 25	1984	George Harding Cuthbertson	Mark Yachts; Ontario Yachts; Eli Laminates; Sumner Yachts		
Marlin 23	1958	Nathaniel G. Herreshoff	Herreshoff Manufacturing; Cape Cod Shipbuilding		
Marlow-Hunter 22	2010	Glenn Henderson	Hunter Marine		
Marlow-Hunter 31	2015	Glenn Henderson	Hunter Marine		
Marlow-Hunter 33	2012	Hunter Design Team	Hunter Marine		
Marlow-Hunter 37	2014	Glenn Henderson	Hunter Marine		
Marlow-Hunter 40	2012	Glenn Henderson	Hunter Marine		
Marlow-Hunter 42SS	2016	Hunter Design Team	Hunter Marine		
Marlow-Hunter 47	2016	Hunter Design Team	Hunter Marine		
Marlow-Hunter 50	2010	Hunter Design Team	Hunter Marine		
Marlow-Hunter 50CC	2009	Hunter Design Team	Hunter Marine		
Marshall 22	1965	Breckenridge Marshall	Marshall Marine Corporation		
Marsh Hen	1981	Reuben Trane	Florida Bay Boat Company		
Martin 16	1995	Don Martin	Abbott Boats		
Martin 29	1972	Don Martin	Cooper Enterprises		
Matilda 20	1971	Robert Tucker	Ouyang Boat Works		
Maxi 77	1972	Pelle Petterson	Mölnlycke Marin		
Melges 40	2017	Botin Partners	Melges Performance Sailboats		
Menger Cat 17	1983	Andrew Menger	Menger Boatworks		
Menger Cat 19	1990	Bill and Andrew Menger	Menger Boatworks		
Menger Cat 23	1990	Bill and Andrew Menger	Menger Boatworks		
Menger Oysterman 23	1977	Bill Menger	Menger Boatworks		
Mercer 44	1959	William Tripp Jr	Mercer Reinforced Plastics; Cape Cod Shipbuilding		
Mercury 18	1939	Ernest Nunes	Ernest Nunes; W. D. Schock Corp; Moore Sailboats		
Meridian 25	1960	Philip Rhodes	De Vries Lentsch; Seafarer Yachts		
Merit 22	1981	Paul Yates	Merit Marine		
Merit 25	1978	Paul Yates	Merit Marine		
Microsail	1980	Gary Mull	Jeanneau et al.		
Mini JOD	1994	Daniel Andrieu	Jeanneau		
Mirage 5.5	1975	Ken Fickett	Mirage Manufacturing		
Mirage 24	1972	Cuthbertson & Cassian	Mirage Yachts		
Mirage 25	1982	Robert Perry	Mirage Yachts		
Mirage 27 (Perry)	1982	Robert Perry	Mirage Yachts		
Mirage 27 (Schmidt)	1975	Peter Schmitt	Mirage Yachts		
Mirage 29	1986	Philippe Harlé	Mirage Yachts		
Mirage 30	1983	Robert Perry	Mirage Yachts		
Mirage 30 SX	1985	Bruce Kirby	Mirage Yachts		
Mirage 32	1987	Robert Perry	Mirage Yachts		
Mirage 33	1982	Robert Perry	Mirage Yachts		
Mirage 35	1983	Robert Perry	Mirage Yachts		
Mirage 39	1989	H. Morton	Mirage Yachts		
Mirage 275	1986	Philippe Harlé	Mirage Yachts		
Mistral T-21	1978		Mistral Sailboats		
MG 335	1986	Tony Castro	CS Yachts		
Monark 540	1974	Pelle Petterson	Monark		
Monark 606	1970	Pelle Petterson	Monark		
Montego 19	1976	Johannes "Jopie" Helsen	Universal Marine		
Montego 20	1976	Johannes "Jopie" Helsen	Universal Marine		
Montego 25	1980	Johannes "Jopie" Helsen	Universal Marine		
Montgomery 15	1980	Jerry Montgomery	Montgomery Marine Products; Nor'Sea Yachts; Montgomery Boats		
Montgomery 17	1973	Lyle Hess	Montgomery Marine Products; Nor'Sea Yachts; Montgomery Boats		
Montgomery 23	1979	Lyle Hess	Montgomery Marine Products		
Moore 24	1972	George Olson and Ron Moore	Moore Sailboats		
Moore 30	1985	Gary Mull	Moore Sailboats		
Moorings 32	1992	Philippe Briand	Jeanneau		
Moorings 295	1994	Hunter Design Team	Hunter Marine		
Moorings 335	1988		Hunter Marine		
Morgan 22	1968	Charles Morgan	Morgan Yachts		
Morgan 24/25	1965	Charles Morgan	Morgan Yachts		
Morgan 32	1980	Ted Brewer and Jack Corey	Morgan Yachts		
Morgan Out Island 41	1971	Charley Morgan	Morgan Yachts		
Mustang 22	1969	Martin Bludworth	PlasTrend		
Mystic Catboat 20	1974	Peter Legnos	Legnos Boatbuilding Company		
Mystic Mini-Ton	1977	Bruce Kirby	Boat Company of Mystic		
Nash 26	1975	Joe Nash	J. J. Nash Industries		
Nautical 39	1979	Charles Morgan and Roger Warren	Nautical Development Corp.		
Nauticat 44	1974	Kaj Gustafsson	Siltala Yachts/Nauticat Yachts Oy		
Nautor 39	1977	Sparkman & Stephens	Oy Nautor AB		
Nautor 43	1976	Sparkman & Stephens	Oy Nautor AB		
Nautor 50	1976	Sparkman & Stephens	Oy Nautor AB		
Navy 44 (M&R)	1985	McCurdy & Rhodes	Tillotson Pearson		
Neptune 24	1978		Capital Yachts Inc.		
Neptunkryssare	1938	Lage Eklund		Sweden	
New Horizons 26	1958	Sparkman & Stephens	Ray Greene & Company		
Newport 16	1965	William Lapworth	Newport Boats; Lockley Newport Boats; Gloucester Yachts; Capital Yachts		
Newport 17	1974	Hary R. Sindle	Newport Boats		
Newport 20	1999	Gary Mull	Lindsey Plastics/Capital Yachts Inc.		
Newport 27-1	1970	C&C Design	Capital Yachts Inc.		
Newport 27-3	1975	C&C Design	Capital Yachts Inc.		
Newport 27S	1974	C&C Design	Capital Yachts Inc.		
Newport 27S-2	1978	C&C Design	Capital Yachts Inc.		
Newport 28	1974	C&C Design	Capital Yachts Inc.		
Newport 28-2	1982	C&C Design	Capital Yachts Inc.		
Newport 30	1968	Gary Mull	Lindsey Plastics/Capital Yachts Inc.		
Newport 31	1987	Gary Mull	Lindsey Plastics/Capital Yachts Inc.		
Newport 33	1971	Gary Mull	Lindsey Plastics/Capital Yachts Inc.		
Newport 41	1972	C&C Design	Lindsey Plastics/Capital Yachts Inc.		
Newport 41S	1974	C&C Design	Capital Yachts Inc.		
Newport 212	1972	Hary R. Sindle	Newport Boats		
Newport 214	1975	Hary R. Sindle	Newport Boats		
New York 30	1980	Nathanael Greene Herreshoff	Herreshoff Manufacturing Co.	United States	
New York 36	1960	William E. Cook	W. D. Schock Corp		
New York 40	1915	Nathanael Greene Herreshoff	Herreshoff Manufacturing Co.	United States	
New York 50	1912	Nathanael Greene Herreshoff	Herreshoff Manufacturing Co.	United States	
New York 70	1899	Nathanael Greene Herreshoff	Herreshoff Manufacturing Co.		
New Zealand 45	1984	Gary Mull	New Zealand Yachts		
Niagara 31	1977	German Frers	Hinterhoeller Yachts		
Niagara 35	1978	Mark Ellis Design	Hinterhoeller Yachts		
Nimble 20	1986	Ted Brewer	Nimble Boats		
Nimble 25 Arctic	1988	Ted Brewer	Nimble Boats		
Nimbus 42	1981	F. Michael Kaufman and Robert Ladd	Albin Marine		
Nomad 22	1967	Denys Rayner	Westerly Marine Construction		
Nonsuch 22	1984	Mark Ellis Design	Hinterhoeller Yachts		
Nonsuch 26	1982	Mark Ellis Design	Hinterhoeller Yachts		
Nonsuch 30	1978	Mark Ellis Design	Hinterhoeller Yachts		
Nonsuch 33	1988	Mark Ellis Design	Hinterhoeller Yachts		
Nonsuch 36	1983	Mark Ellis Design	Hinterhoeller Yachts		
Nonsuch 40	1988	Mark Ellis Design	Sen Koh Shipbuilding		
Nonsuch 324	1994	Mark Ellis Design	Hinterhoeller Yachts		
Nordic 40	1978	Robert Perry	Nordic Yachts		
Nordic 44	1980	Robert Perry	Nordic Yachts		
Nordica 16	1820	Ole Jensen	Exe Fibercraft		
Nordica 20	1975	B. Malta-Muller	Nordica Yachts (Exe Fibercraft)		
Nordic Folkboat					
Nordisk Kryssare 5½	1931	Development class			
Nor'Sea 27	1976	Lyle C. Hess	Nor'Sea Marine		
Nor'Sea 37	1992	Lyle C. Hess	Nor'Sea Marine		
Northern 1/4 Ton	1972	Cuthbertson & Cassian	Northern Yachts		
Northern 25	1970	Philip Rhodes	Northern Yachts		
North Star 38	1971	Sparkman and Stephens	North Star Yachts		
North Star 80/20	1973	Sparkman and Stephens	North Star Yachts; Hughes Boat Works		
North Star 500	1973	Sparkman and Stephens	North Star Yachts		
North Star 600	1975	Sparkman and Stephens	North Star Yachts		
North Star 1500	1974	Sparkman and Stephens	North Star Yachts		
Northwind 29	1969	C&C Design	Paceship Yachts		
Nova 33	1981	Peter Norlin	Albin Marine; Express Production AB		
Nutmeg 24	1964	William Shaw	Tanzer Industries		
Ocean 40	1979	Gary Mull	Kyung-Il Yachts		
O'Day 19	1979	C.R. Hunt & Associates	O'Day Corp.		
O'Day 20	1973	C.R. Hunt & Associates	O'Day Corp.		
O'Day 22	1972	C.R. Hunt & Associates	O'Day Corp.		
O'Day 23	1972	C.R. Hunt & Associates	O'Day Corp.		
O'Day 25	1975	C.R. Hunt & Associates	O'Day Corp.		
O'Day 26	1983	C.R. Hunt & Associates	O'Day Corp.		
O'Day 28	1978	C.R. Hunt & Associates	O'Day Corp.		
O'Day 30	1977	C.R. Hunt & Associates	O'Day Corp.		
O'Day 39	1982	Philippe Briand	O'Day Corp.		
O'Day 40	1986	Philippe Briand; C.R. Hunt & Associates	O'Day Corp.		
O'Day 192	1984	C.R. Hunt & Associates	O'Day Corp.		
O'Day 222	1974	C.R. Hunt & Associates	O'Day Corp.		
O'Day 240	1988	C.R. Hunt & Associates	O'Day Corp.		
O'Day 272	1985	C.R. Hunt & Associates	O'Day Corp.		
O'Day 302	1988	C.R. Hunt & Associates	O'Day Corp.		
Odyssey 30	1987	George Harding Cuthbertson	Ouyang Boat Works		
OE 36	1978	Olle Enderlein	Sundsörs båtbyggeri		
Olson 25	1984	George Olson	Pacific Boat Works; Ericson Yachts		
Ontario 32	1974	C&C Design	Ontario Yachts		
Orion 27	1979	Henry Mohrschladt	Pacific Seacraft		
Orion 27-2	1981	Henry Mohrschladt	Pacific Seacraft		
Orion 50	1983	Gary Mull	Ta Shing Yacht Building		
Östersjö 6	1938	Development class			
Östersjö 8	1938	Development class			
Östersjö 10	1938	Development class			
Outlaw 26	1965	Philip Rhodes	O'Day Corp.		
Paceship 23	1969	Cuthbertson & Cassian	Paceship Yachts		
Paceship PY 23	1973	John Deknatel	Paceship Yachts/American Machine and Foundry		
Paceship PY 26	1972	John Deknatel	Paceship Yachts/American Machine and Foundry		
Pacific Seacraft 25	1976	Henry Mohrschladt	Pacific Seacraft		
Parker Dawson 26	1973	Robert Finch	Parker Dawson Yachts		
Pearson 22	1968	William Shaw	Pearson Yachts		
Pearson 23	1978	William Shaw	Pearson Yachts		
Pearson 23C	1983	William Shaw	Pearson Yachts		
Pearson 24	1967	William Shaw	Pearson Yachts		
Pearson 26	1970	William Shaw	Pearson Yachts		
Pearson 28	1975	William Shaw	Pearson Yachts		
Pearson 28-2	1985	William Shaw	Pearson Yachts		
Pearson 30	1971	William Shaw	Pearson Yachts		
Pearson 303	1983	William Shaw	Pearson Yachts		
Pearson Electra	1960	Carl Alberg	Pearson Yachts		
Pearson Ensign	1962	Carl Alberg	Pearson Yachts		
Pearson Lark	1967	William Shaw	Pearson Yachts		
Pearson Triton	1958	Carl Alberg	Pearson Yachts		
Peep Hen 14	1981	Reuben Trane	Nimble Boats Works; Sovereign Yachts; Florida Bay Boat Company		
Pierce Arrow 18	1982	Mark Leonard	Pierce Arrow Marine		
Pilot 35	1960	Sparkman & Stephens	Henry R. Hinckley & Company		
PJ 30 1/2 Ton	1973	Sparkman & Stephens	Hughes Boat Works; Palmer Johnson		
Poacher 21	1979	W. Richardson	Parker Dawson Yachts		
Polaris 26	1958	William Tripp Jr	Werf Gusto; Seafarer Yachts		
Portman 36	1979		Auroraglas, Watkins Yachts		
Precision 18	1984	Jim Taylor Yacht Designs	Precision Boat Works		
Precision 21	1988	Jim Taylor Yacht Designs	Precision Boat Works		
Precision 23	1986	Jim Taylor Yacht Designs	Precision Boat Works		
Precision 27	1989	Jim Taylor Yacht Designs	Precision Boat Works		
Precision 28	1997	Jim Taylor Yacht Designs	Precision Boat Works		
Precision 165	1995	Jim Taylor Yacht Designs	Precision Boat Works		
Precision 185	2001	Jim Taylor Yacht Designs	Precision Boat Works		
Prospect 900	1975	Ericus Gerhardus van de Stadt	Rydgeway Marine		
Quickstep 19	1989	Stuart Windley	Quickstep Sailboats		
Quickstep 21	1997	Michael Price	Quickstep Sailboats		
Quickstep 24	1976	Ted Brewer	Quickstep Sailboats		
Ranger 22	1977	Gary Mull	Jensen Marine/Ranger Yachts		
Ranger 23	1971	Gary Mull	Ranger Yachts		
Ranger 24	1974	Raymond H. Richards	Ranger Fiberglass Boats		
Ranger 26	1969	Gary Mull	Ranger Yachts		
Ranger 26-2	1980	Gary Mull	Ranger Yachts and Lear Siegler		
Ranger 28	1976	Gary Mull	Ranger Yachts and Bangor Punta		
Ranger 29	1971	Gary Mull	Ranger Yachts		
Ranger 30	1977	C. Raymond Hunt Assoc.	Ranger Yachts		
Ranger 32	1973	Gary Mull	Ranger Yachts		
Ranger 33	1969	Gary Mull	Ranger Yachts		
Ranger 37	1973	Gary Mull	Ranger Yachts		
Raven (sailboat)	1949	Roger McAleer	Sound Marine Construction; Cape Cod Shipbuilding; O'Day Corp. Nevins Inc.		
Redline 25	1969	Cuthbertson & Cassian	C&C Yachts		
Redline 41	1967	Cuthbertson & Cassian	C&C Yachts		
Regatta 39	1982	Tony Castro	Jeanneau		
Rob Roy 23	1980	Edward S. Brewer	Marine Concepts		
Rocket 22	2002	Gary Mull and Don Martin	Rocket Boats		
Rhodes 19	1962	Philip Rhodes	O'Day Corporation; Stuart Marine		
Rhodes 22	1968	Philip Rhodes	C&C Yachts; Ray Greene & Co; Siddons & Sindle; General Boats; Lofland Sail-craft		
Rhodes 77	1947	Philip Rhodes	Burger Boat Company		
Rhodes Ranger 29	1960	Philip Rhodes	de Visser Shipyard		
RK 20	1972	Lyle C. Hess	Coastal Recreation, Inc.		
RK 21	1972	Peter Barrett	Coastal Recreation, Inc.		
Roue 20	1922	William J. Roué			
Rush 31	1979	Ron Holland	Jeanneau		
Rush Royale 31	1979	Ron Holland	Jeanneau		
S2 6.7	1980	Don Wennersten	S2 Yachts		
S2 6.8	1976	Don Wennersten & Arthur Edmunds	S2 Yachts		
S2 6.9	1983	Don Wennersten, Graham & Schlageter	S2 Yachts		
S2 7.0	1975	Arthur Edmunds	S2 Yachts		
S2 7.3	1978	Arthur Edmunds	S2 Yachts		
S2 7.9	1979	Graham & Schlageter	S2 Yachts		
S2 8.0A	1974	Arthur Edmunds	S2 Yachts		
S2 8.0B	1976	Arthur Edmunds	S2 Yachts		
S2 8.0C	1975	Arthur Edmunds	S2 Yachts		
S2 8.5	1980	Arthur Edmunds	S2 Yachts		
S2 8.6	1983	Arthur Edmunds	S2 Yachts		
S2 9.1	1983	Graham & Schlageter	S2 Yachts		
S2 9.2	1977	Arthur Edmunds	S2 Yachts		
S2 10.3	1982	Graham & Schlageter	S2 Yachts		
S2 11.0	1977	Arthur Edmunds	S2 Yachts		
S2 22	1985	Don Wennersten, Graham & Schlageter	S2 Yachts		
S2 27	1985	Graham & Schlageter	S2 Yachts		
S2 35	1986	Graham & Schlageter	S2 Yachts		
S-class	1919	Nathanael Greene Herreshoff	Herreshoff Manufacturing Co.	United States	
S 30	1972	Knud Reimers	Fisksätra varv		
S80	1978	Kim Swarbrick	Swarbrick Brothers	Australia	
Sabre 28	1971	Roger Hewson	Sabre Yachts		
Sabre 38	1981	Roger Hewson and the Sabre Design Team	Sabre Yachts		
Sage 17	2011	Jerry Montgomery	Sage Marine		
Sailmaster 22	1963	Sparkman and Stephens	Werf Gusto; De Vries Lentsch; Seafarer Yachts		
Sanderling 18	1962	Breckenridge Marshall	Marshall Marine Corporation		
San Juan 21	1970	Don Martin	Clark Boat Company		
San Juan 23	1975	Bruce Kirby; Don Clark	Clark Boat Company		
San Juan 24	1973	Bruce Kirby	Clark Boat Company		
San Juan 33S	1981	David Pedrick	Clark Boat Company		
San Juan 34	1980	Hein Driehuyzen	Clark Boat Company		
Sanibel 18	1985	Charles Ludwig	Captiva Yachts		
Sandpiper 565	1972	Leonardo da Costa Sayago	Sandpiper Marine and CL Sailboats		
Sandstream 26	1980s		Stanlet Hatch		
Sangria 25	1969	Philippe H. Harlé	Jeanneau		
Santana 20	1976	W. Shad Turner	W. D. Schock Corp.		
Santana 21	1969	Seymour Paul	W. D. Schock Corp.		
Santana 22	1966	Gary Mull	W. D. Schock Corp.		
Santana 23	1978	Gary Mull	W. D. Schock Corp.		
Santana 25	1973	W. Shad Turner	W. D. Schock Corp.		
Santana 26	1971	Seymour Paul	W. D. Schock Corp.		
Santana 27	1967	Gary Mull	W. D. Schock Corp.		
Santana 28	1976	W. Shad Turner	W. D. Schock Corp.		
Santana 30/30	1981	Bruce Nelson and Bruce Merek	W. D. Schock Corp.		
Santana 37	1969	Gary Mull	W. D. Schock Corp.		
Santana 39	1972	Gary Mull	W. D. Schock Corp.		
Santana 228	1978	W. Shad Turner	W. D. Schock Corp.		
Santana 525	1977	W. Shad Turner	W. D. Schock Corp.		
Santana 2023	1993	Steve Schock	W. D. Schock Corp.		
Santander 30	1966	William Tripp Jr	Dock Plastics		
Särklass A		Development class			
Särklass C		Development class			
Scampi 30	1969	Peter Norlin	Albin Marine; Shipman Sweden AB		
Scan-Kap 99	1977	Torben Peter Larsen	Hanbjerg Møbelfabrik		
Schock 22	1960	Wendell H. Calkins	W. D. Schock Corp.		
Schock 23	1999	Steven Schock & Reijo Salminen	W. D. Schock Corp.		
Schock 25	1961	Seymour Paul	W. D. Schock Corp.		
Schock 34 GP	1985	Bruce Nelson; Bruce Marek	W. D. Schock Corp.		
Schock 34 PC	1986	Bruce Nelson; Bruce Marek	W. D. Schock Corp.		
Schock 35	1984	W. Shad Turner	W. D. Schock Corp.		
Schock 40	2000	DynaYacht	W. D. Schock Corp.		
Schock 41	1983	William E. Cook	W. D. Schock Corp		
Schock 55	1990	Bruce Marek	W. D. Schock Corp.		
Sea Bird 37	1973	Stan Huntingford; Hardin International	Cooper Enterprises; Hardin International		
Sea Bird 37 MS	1973	Stan Huntingford; Hardin International; Cooper Enterprises	Cooper Enterprises		
Seafarer 22	1976	McCurdy & Rhodes	Seafarer Yachts		
Seafarer 23	1976	McCurdy & Rhodes	Seafarer Yachts		
Seafarer 23 Challenger	1978	McCurdy & Rhodes	Seafarer Yachts		
Seafarer 23 Kestrel	1963	Sparkman & Stephens	De Vries Lentsch; Seafarer Yachts		
Seafarer 24	1974	McCurdy & Rhodes	Seafarer Yachts		
Seafarer 26	1977	McCurdy & Rhodes	Seafarer Yachts		
Seafarer 29	1972	McCurdy & Rhodes	Seafarer Yachts		
Seafarer 30	1978	McCurdy & Rhodes	Seafarer Yachts		
Seafarer 31 Mark I	1968	William H. Tripp Jr. McCurdy & Rhodes	Seafarer Yachts		
Seafarer 31 Mark II	1974	McCurdy & Rhodes	Seafarer Yachts		
Seafarer 34	1972	McCurdy & Rhodes	Seafarer Yachts		
Seafarer Bahama 35 MS	1960	Philip Rhodes	de Vries Lentsch		
Seafarer 36C	1968	Philip Rhodes	de Vries Lentsch		
Seafarer 37	1980	McCurdy & Rhodes	Seafarer Yachts		
Seafarer 38	1971	Philip Rhodes	Seafarer Yachts		
Seafarer 45	1961	Sparkman & Stephens	Werf Gusto		
Seafarer 46	1967	Sparkman & Stephens	Seafarer Yachts		
Seafarer 48	1969	Sparkman & Stephens	Seafarer Yachts		
Seaforth 24	1977	Stephen Seaton	Capson Marine; Precision Boat Works		
Sea Sprite 23	1958	Carl Alberg	American Boatbuilding; Wickford Shipyard; C. E. Ryder; Sailstar Boat Company; Beetle Boat Company		
Sea Sprite 27	1960	Bill Luders	C. E. Ryder		
Sea Sprite 34	1980	Bill Luders	C. E. Ryder		
Seaward 22	1985	Nick Hake	Hake Yachts		
Seaward 23	1984	Nick Hake	Hake Yachts		
Seaward 24	1984	Nick Hake	Hake Yachts		
Seaward 25	1984	Nick Hake	Hake Yachts		
Seaward 26RK	2005	Nick Hake	Hake Yachts		
Seaward 32RK	2006	Nick Hake	Hake Yachts		
Seaward 46RK	2012	Nick Hake	Hake Yachts		
Seaward Eagle	1996	Nick Hake	Hake Yachts		
Seaward Fox	1993	Nick Hake	Hake Yachts		
Seidelmann 24-1	1981	Bob Seidelmann; Bruce Kirby; W. Ross	Seidelmann Yachts; Paceship Yachts		
Seidelmann 25	1977	Bob Seidelmann	Seidelmann Yachts		
Seidelmann 30	1977	Bob Seidelmann	Seidelmann Yachts		
Seidelmann 30-T	1977	Bob Seidelmann	Seidelmann Yachts		
Seidelmann 34	1981	Bob Seidelmann	Seidelmann Yachts		
Seidelmann 37	1980	Bob Seidelmann	Seidelmann Yachts		
Seidelmann 245	1981	Bob Seidelmann	Seidelmann Yachts		
Seidelmann 295	1982	Bob Seidelmann	Seidelmann Yachts		
Seidelmann 299	1979	Bob Seidelmann	Seidelmann Yachts		
Selection 37	1984	Joubert-Nivelt	Jeanneau		
Shannon 38	1975	Walter Shultz and G, H. Stadel & Son	Shannon Yachts		
SHE 36	1977	Sparkman & Stephens	South Hants Engineering		
Shields (keelboat)	1962	Olin Stephens (Sparkman & Stephens)	Cape Cod Shipbuilding; Hinckley Yachts; Chris-Craft Industries		
Signet 20	1960	Ray Kaufmann	Hurley Marine; Gilmax Limited; Signet Marine		
Silhouette	1954	Robert Tucker	Hurley Marine; Varne Marine		
Singoalla 34	1970	Per Brohäll	Albin Marine		
Siren 17	1974	Hubert Vandestadt	Vandestadt & McGruer Ltd		
Sirius 22	1976	Hubert Vandestadt	Vandestadt and McGruer		
Sirius 26	1987	Jean Berret	Vandestadt and McGruer		
Sirius 28	1982	Hubert Vandestadt	Vandestadt and McGruer		
Sirocco 15	1970		Sirocco Boatworks		
Skipper 20	1978	unknown	Southern Sails		
Slipper 17	1981	Nick Hake	Starboard Yacht Company; Hake Yachts		
Snapdragon 747	1964	Thames Structural Plastics	Thames Marine		
Sonata 26	1980	Gary Mull	Investigator Yachts		
Sonata 6.7	1986	Gary Mull	Sonata Yachts		
Sonata 8	1979	Gary Mull	Investigator Yachts		
Sonderklasse		Development class			
Sonic 23	1981	Joseph D'Alessio	Sonic Sailboats		
South Coast 21	1965	Carl Alberg	South Coast Seacraft		
South Coast 22	1968	Carl Alberg; James Monroe; Hollis Metcalf	South Coast Seacraft		
South Coast 23	1965	Carl Alberg	South Coast Seacraft		
South Coast 22	1968	Carl Alberg; James Monroe; Hollis Metcalf	South Coast Seacraft		
South Coast 25	1969	Warren Metcalf	South Coast Seacraft		
South Coast 26	1977	James Monroe	South Coast Seacraft		
Southern Cross 28	1978	Thomas C. Gillmer	C. E. Ryder		
Southern Cross 35	1978	Thomas C. Gillmer	C. E. Ryder		
Sou'wester 42/43	1982	McCurdy & Rhodes	Hinckley Yachts		
Sou'wester 51	1984	McCurdy & Rhodes	Hinckley Yachts		
Sou'wester 51 CC	1986	McCurdy & Rhodes	Hinckley Yachts		
Sou'wester 59	1982	McCurdy & Rhodes	Hinckley Yachts		
Sovereign 7.0	1980	Arthur Edmunds	Sovereign Yachts		
Sovereign 17	1980	Sovereign Design Group	Sovereign Yachts		
Sovereign 20	1982	Sovereign Design Group	Sovereign Yachts		
Sovereign 23	1981	Arthur Edmunds	Sovereign Yachts		
Sovereign 26	1982	Sovereign Design Group	Sovereign Yachts		
Sovereign 28	1983		Sovereign Yachts		
Sovereign 30	1998	Sovereign Design Group	Sovereign Yachts		
Sovereign Princess 24	1981	Arthur Edmunds	Sovereign Yachts		
Spækhugger	1969	Peter Bruun	Flipper Scow		
Spirit 21	1977	Hank Hinckley	Glastron		
Spirit 23	1978	Robert Finch	Glastron		
Sprint 95	1989	Joubert Nivelt Design	Archambault Boats		
Sprinto	2000	Joubert Nivelt Design	Archambault Boats		
Starwind 19	1982	Jim Taylor Yacht Designs	Starwind; Chrysler Marine; Spindrift One Designs		
Starwind 223	1984	Cortland Steck	Wellcraft Marine		
Spindrift 22	1982	Jim Taylor Yacht Designs	Rebel Industries		
Stjärnbåt	1913	Jan Jacobsson			
Stone Horse	1931	Samuel S. Crocker	Edey & Duff		
Stratus 36	1980	Peter Norlin	Albin Marine		
Stuart Knockabout	1932	L. Francis Herreshoff	Edey & Duff/Ballentines's Boat Shop; Stuart Knockabout LLC		
Sun 2000	1999	Olivier Petit	Jeanneau		
Sun 2500	2004	Olivier Petit	Jeanneau		
Sun Charm 39	1988	Jacques Fauroux	Jeanneau		
Sun Dance 36	1988	Daniel Andrieu; J&J Design	Jeanneau		
Sun Dream 28	1987	Tony Castro	Jeanneau		
Sun Fast 1/2 Ton	1984	Tony Castro	Jeanneau		
Sun Fast 17	1994	Jacek Centkowski	Jeanneau		
Sun Fast 20	1985	Jacek Centkowski	Jeanneau		
Sun Fast 26	1993	Philippe Briand; Jeanneau Design Office	Jeanneau		
Sun Fast 30 One Design	2023	Van Peteghem/Lauriot-Prevost	Jeanneau		
Sun Fast 31	1991	Daniel Andrieu	Jeanneau		
Sun Fast 32	1993	Philippe Briand	Jeanneau		
Sun Fast 32i	2001	Philippe Briand	Jeanneau		
Sun Fast 35	2004	Marc Lombard	Jeanneau		
Sun Fast 36	1994	Philippe Briand	Jeanneau		
Sun Fast 37	2000	Jacques Fauroux	Jeanneau		
Sun Fast 39	1989	Jacques Fauroux	Jeanneau		
Sun Fast 40	2003	Daniel Andrieu	Jeanneau		
Sun Fast 40.3	2004	Daniel Andrieu	Jeanneau		
Sun Fast 41	1990	Doug Peterson	Jeanneau		
Sun Fast 42	1996	Philippe Briand	Jeanneau		
Sun Fast 43	2003	Daniel Andrieu	Jeanneau		
Sun Fast 52	1992	Philippe Briand	Jeanneau		
Sun Fast 3200	2008	Daniel Andrieu	Jeanneau		
Sun Fast 3300	2019	Daniel Andrieu; Guillaume Verdier	Jeanneau		
Sun Fast 3600	2012	Daniel Andrieu	Jeanneau		
Sun Kiss 45	1983	Philippe Briand	Jeanneau		
Sun Kiss 47	1982	Philippe Briand	Jeanneau		
Sun Legende 41	1984	Doug Peterson	Jeanneau		
Sun Liberty 34	1989	Daniel Andrieu	Jeanneau		
Sun Light 30	1986	Daniel Andrieu	Jeanneau		
Sun Magic 44	1987	Daniel Andrieu	Jeanneau		
Sun Odyssey 24.2	1998	Jacques Fauroux	Jeanneau		
Sun Odyssey 26	2002	Philippe Briand; Jeanneau Design Office	Jeanneau		
Sun Odyssey 28.1	1994	Tony Castro	Jeanneau		
Sun Odyssey 29.2	1997	Jacques Fauroux	Jeanneau		
Sun Odyssey 30i	2008	Marc Lombard	Jeanneau		
Sun Odyssey 31	1991	Daniel Andrieu	Jeanneau		
Sun Odyssey 32	2002	Philippe Briand	Jeanneau		
Sun Odyssey 32.1	1994	Philippe Briand	Jeanneau		
Sun Odyssey 32.2	1998	Jacques Fauroux	Jeanneau		
Sun Odyssey 32i	2005	Philippe Briand	Jeanneau		
Sun Odyssey 33	1992	Daniel Andrieu	Jeanneau		
Sun Odyssey 33i	2008	Marc Lombard	Jeanneau		
Sun Odyssey 34	1991	Daniel Andrieu	Jeanneau		
Sun Odyssey 34.2	1998	Jacques Fauroux	Jeanneau		
Sun Odyssey 35	2003	Marc Lombard Design	Jeanneau		
Sun Odyssey 36	1990	Daniel Andrieu; J&J Design	Jeanneau		
Sun Odyssey 36.2	1998	Jacques Fauroux	Jeanneau		
Sun Odyssey 36i	2009	Marc Lombard	Jeanneau		
Sun Odyssey 37	1998	Jacques Fauroux	Jeanneau		
Sun Odyssey 37.1	1994	Jacques Fauroux	Jeanneau		
Sun Odyssey 39	1990	Jacques Fauroux	Jeanneau		
Sun Odyssey 39 DS	2008	Marc Lombard; Vittorio Garroni	Jeanneau		
Sun Odyssey 39i	2005	Marc Lombard	Jeanneau		
Sun Odyssey 40	1998	Daniel Andrieu	Jeanneau		
Sun Odyssey 40.3	2004	Daniel Andrieu	Jeanneau		
Sun Odyssey 40 DS	2000	Daniel Andrieu	Jeanneau		
Sun Odyssey 41 DS	2012	Philippe Briand; Franck Darnet; Flahault Design	Jeanneau		
Sun Odyssey 42	1990	Guy Ribadeau Dumas	Jeanneau		
Sun Odyssey 42.1	1992	Daniel Andrieu	Jeanneau		
Sun Odyssey 42.2	1995	Guy Ribadeau Dumas	Jeanneau		
Sun Odyssey 42 CC	1996	Guy Ribadeau Dumas	Jeanneau		
Sun Odyssey 42 DS	2007	Marc Lombard Design	Jeanneau		
Sun Odyssey 42i	2005	Marc Lombard Design	Jeanneau		
Sun Odyssey 43	1986	Daniel Andrieu	Jeanneau		
Sun Odyssey 43 DS	1994	Daniel Andrieu	Jeanneau		
Sun Odyssey 44 DS	2011	Philippe Briand; Franck Darnet; Flahault Design; Jeanneau Design Office	Jeanneau		
Sun Odyssey 44i	2009	Philippe Briand	Jeanneau		
Sun Odyssey 45	2004	Philippe Briand; Jeanneau Design Office	Jeanneau		
Sun Odyssey 45.1	1995	Philippe Briand; Jeanneau Design Office	Jeanneau		
Sun Odyssey 45.2	1997	Philippe Briand; Jeanneau Design Office	Jeanneau		
Sun Odyssey 45 DS	2007	Philippe Briand	Jeanneau		
Sun Odyssey 47	1991	Philippe Briand	Jeanneau		
Sun Odyssey 49	2003	Philippe Briand	Jeanneau		
Sun Odyssey 49 DS	2004	Philippe Briand; Vittorio Garroni	Jeanneau		
Sun Odyssey 49i	2009	Philippe Briand	Jeanneau		
Sun Odyssey 50 DS	2008	Philippe Briand	Jeanneau		
Sun Odyssey 51	1989	Bruce Farr; J&J Design	Jeanneau		
Sun Odyssey 52.2	1995	Bruce Farr	Jeanneau		
Sun Odyssey 54 DS	2004	Jacques Fauroux; Vittorio Garroni; Jeanneau Design Office	Jeanneau		
Sun Odyssey 319	2018	Jeanneau Design Office	Jeanneau		
Sun Odyssey 349	2014	Marc Lombard Design	Jeanneau		
Sun Odyssey 379	2010	Marc Lombard Design	Jeanneau		
Sun Odyssey 380	2021	Marc Lombard; Piaton Bonet Yacht Design; Jeanneau Design Office	Jeanneau		
Sun Odyssey 389	2015	Marc Lombard Design; Jeanneau Design Office	Jeanneau		
Sun Odyssey 409	2010	Philippe Briand	Jeanneau		
Sun Odyssey 410	2015	Marc Lombard Design; Jean-Marc Piaton	Jeanneau		
Sun Odyssey 419	2015	Philippe Briand; Jeanneau Design Office	Jeanneau		
Sun Odyssey 439	2011	Philippe Briand	Jeanneau		
Sun Odyssey 449	2015	Philippe Briand	Jeanneau		
Sun Odyssey 440	2017	Philippe Briand; Piaton Bonet Yacht Design; Jeanneau Design Office	Jeanneau		
Sun Odyssey 469	2013	Philippe Briand	Jeanneau		
Sun Odyssey 490	2018	Philippe Briand; Piaton Bonet Yacht Design; Jeanneau Design Office	Jeanneau		
Sun Odyssey 509	2012	Philippe Briand	Jeanneau		
Sun Odyssey 519	2015	Philippe Briand; Jeanneau Design Office	Jeanneau		
Sun Rise 34	1984	Jacques Fauroux	Jeanneau		
Sun Shine 36	1982	Tony Castro	Jeanneau		
Sun Shine 38	1987	Tony Castro	Jeanneau		
Sun Way 21	1989	J&J Design	Jeanneau		
Sun Way 27	1987	Philippe Harlé	Jeanneau		
Sun Way 28	1987	Tony Castro	Jeanneau		
Surprise 25	1977	Joubert Nivelt Design	Archambault Boats		
Suspens	1979	Joubert Nivelt Design	Archambault Boats		
Swan 36	1967	Sparkman & Stephens	Nautor's Swan		
Swan 36-2	1988	Germán Frers	Nautor's Swan		
Swan 37	1970	Sparkman & Stephens	Nautor's Swan		
Swan 371	1979	Ron Holland	Nautor's Swan		
Swan 38	1974	Sparkman & Stephens	Nautor's Swan		
Swan 39	1978	Ron Holland	Nautor's Swan		
Swan 391	1981	Ron Holland	Nautor's Swan		
Swan 40	1970	Sparkman & Stephens	Nautor's Swan		
Swan 40 Frers	1992	Germán Frers	Nautor's Swan		
Swan 41	1973	Sparkman & Stephens	Nautor's Swan		
Swan 411	1977	Sparkman & Stephens	Nautor's Swan		
Swan 42	1980	Ron Holland	Nautor's Swan		
Swan 43	1967	Sparkman & Stephens	Nautor's Swan		
Swan 431	1976	Sparkman & Stephens	Nautor's Swan		
Swan 43 Holland	1985	Ron Holland	Nautor's Swan		
Swan 44	1972	Sparkman & Stephens	Nautor's Swan		
Swan 441	1979	Ron Holland	Nautor's Swan		
Swan 44 Frers Mk I	1989	Germán Frers	Nautor's Swan		
Swan 44 Frers Mk II	1996	Germán Frers	Nautor's Swan		
Swan 45	2002	Germán Frers	Nautor's Swan		
Swan 46 Mk I	1983	Germán Frers	Nautor's Swan		
Swan 46 Mk II	1989	Germán Frers	Nautor's Swan		
Swan 46 Mk III	2004	Germán Frers	Nautor's Swan		
Swan 47	1975	Sparkman & Stephens	Nautor's Swan		
Swan 47-2	1976	Sparkman & Stephens	Nautor's Swan		
Swan 48	1971	Sparkman & Stephens	Nautor's Swan		
Swan 48 Frers	1995	Germán Frers	Nautor's Swan		
Swan 48-3 Frers	2019	Germán Frers	Nautor's Swan		
Swan 51	1980	Germán Frers	Nautor's Swan		
Swan 53 Mk I	1987	Germán Frers	Nautor's Swan		
Swan 53 Mk II	2004	Germán Frers	Nautor's Swan		
Swan 54	2016	Germán Frers	Nautor's Swan		
Swan 55	1970	Sparkman & Stephens	Nautor's Swan		
Swan 55 Frers	2021	Germán Frers	Nautor's Swan		
Swan 55CC Frers	1990	Germán Frers	Nautor's Swan		
Swan 56	1996	Germán Frers	Nautor's Swan		
Swan 57	1977	Sparkman & Stephens	Nautor's Swan		
Swan 57 RS	1996	Germán Frers	Nautor's Swan		
Swan 58	2020	Germán Frers	Nautor's Swan		
Swan 59	1984	Germán Frers	Nautor's Swan		
Swan 60	1994	Germán Frers	Nautor's Swan		
Swan 61	1985	Germán Frers	Nautor's Swan		
Swan 62 RS	2001	Germán Frers	Nautor's Swan		
Swan 62 FD	2004	Germán Frers	Nautor's Swan		
Swan 65	1972	Sparkman & Stephens	Nautor's Swan		
Swan 65 Frers	2019	Germán Frers	Nautor's Swan		
Swan 651	1982	Germán Frers	Nautor's Swan		
Swan 66	2006	Germán Frers	Nautor's Swan		
Swan 68	1991	Germán Frers	Nautor's Swan		
Swan 70	2001	Germán Frers	Nautor's Swan		
Swan 75 FD	2004	Germán Frers	Nautor's Swan		
Swan 75 RS	2004	Germán Frers	Nautor's Swan		
Swan 76	1979	Sparkman & Stephens	Nautor's Swan		
Swan 77	1992	Germán Frers	Nautor's Swan		
Swan 78	2018	Germán Frers	Nautor's Swan		
Swan 80	1999	Germán Frees	Nautor's Swan		
Swan 80-2	2010	Germán Frers	Nautor's Swan		
Swan 82	2002	Germán Frers	Nautor's Swan		
Swan 86	1988	Germán Frers	Nautor's Swan		
Swan 88	2023	Germán Frers	Nautor's Swan		
Swan 90	2007	Germán Frers	Nautor's Swan		
Swan 95 S	2017	Germán Frers	Nautor's Swan		
Swan 98	2020	Germán Frers	Nautor's Swan		
Swan 100 FD	2002	Germán Frers	Nautor's Swan		
Swan 100 RS	2002	Germán Frers	Nautor's Swan		
Swan 100 S	2002	Germán Frers	Nautor's Swan		
Swan 105 RS	2014	Germán Frers	Nautor's Swan		
Swan 108	2023	Germán Frers	Nautor's Swan		
Swan 112 RS	1999	Germán Frers	Nautor's Swan		
Swan 115	2015	Germán Frers	Nautor's Swan		
Swan 120	2021	Germán Frers	Nautor's Swan		
Swan 128	2025	Germán Frers	Nautor's Swan		
Swan 131	2006	Germán Frers	Nautor's Swan		
Swan 601	2004	Germán Frers	Nautor's Swan		
Sun Fizz 40	1980	Philippe Briand	Jeanneau		
Swedish Match 40	2004	Pelle Petterson	Maxi Yachts		
Swiftsure 33	1959	Philip Rhodes	deVries Lentch; Royal Netherlands Aircraft		
Symphonie 32	1979	Philippe Briand	Jeanneau		
Tanzer 7.5	1977	Johann Tanzer	Tanzer Industries		
Tanzer 8.5	1978	Johann Tanzer	Tanzer Industries		
Tanzer 10	1980	Richard Carter	Tanzer Industries		
Tanzer 10.5	1983	Richard Carter/Johann Tanzer	Tanzer Industries		
Tanzer 22	1970	Johann Tanzer	Tanzer Industries		
Tanzer 25	1986	Joubert-Nivelt	Tanzer Industries		
Tanzer 26	1986	Johann Tanzer	Tanzer Industries		
Tanzer 27	1982	C. Raymond Hunt	Tanzer Industries		
Tanzer 28	1972	Johann Tanzer	Tanzer Industries		
Tanzer 29	1986	Joubert-Nivelt	Tanzer Industries		
Tanzer 31	1984	George Cuthbertson	Tanzer Industries		
Tartan 10	1978	Sparkman & Stephens	Tartan Marine		
Tartan 27	1961	Sparkman & Stephens	Tartan Marine		
Tartan 27 Yawl	1961	Sparkman & Stephens	Tartan Marine		
Tartan 27-2	1976	Sparkman & Stephens	Tartan Marine		
Tartan 33	1979	Sparkman & Stephens	Tartan Marine		
Tartan 34 C	1968	Sparkman & Stephens	Tartan Marine		
Tartan 34-2	1984	Sparkman & Stephens	Tartan Marine		
Tayana 37	1976	Robert Perry	Ta Yang Yacht Building		
Terrapin 24	1973	Dave Westphal	Friendship Manufacturing Company		
TES 28 Magnam	2010	Tomasz Siwik	Stocznia TES – Yacht		
Thames Marine Mirage 29	1983		Thames Marine		
Thomas 35	1988	Graham & Schlageter			
Tiger 25	1969	John A. Butler	Westerly Marine Construction		
Tonic 23	1985	Philippe Harlé	Jeanneau		
Triangle 20	1961	Charles Angle	Grampian Marine		
Trinidad 48	1981	Guy Ribadeau Dumas	Jeanneau		
Tripp 30	1963	William Tripp Jr	Mechans Ltd; Werkspoor		
Triton 21	1985	Clark Scarborough	Pearson Yachts		
Triton 22	1985	Gary Mull	Pearson Yachts		
Triton 25	1984	Gary Mull	Pearson Yachts		
Triton 27	1984	Doug Peterson	Pearson Yachts		
Triton 30	1985	Doug Peterson	Pearson Yachts		
Tumlare		Knud Reimers			
Tylercraft 24	1961	Ted Tyler	Tylercraft		
Typhoon 18	1967	Carl Alberg	Cape Dory Yachts; Naugus Fiberglass		
Typhoon Senior	1984	Carl Alberg	Cape Dory Yachts		
UFO 34	1973	Holman and Pye			
US Yachts US 18	1980	G. William McVay	US Yachts		
US Yachts US 21	1982	Clark Scarborough	US Yachts		
US Yachts US 22	1979	Gary Mull	US Yachts		
US Yachts US 25	1981	Gary Mull	US Yachts		
US Yachts US 27	1983	Doug Peterson; Daryl Watson	US Yachts		
US Yachts US 29	1977	Doug Peterson	US Yachts		
US Yachts US 30	1979	Doug Peterson; Daryl Watson	US Yachts		
US Yachts US 33	1981	Doug Peterson	US Yachts		
US Yachts US 35	1979	Stan Huntingford	US Yachts		
US Yachts US 42	1982	Stan Huntingford	US Yachts		
US Yachts US 305	1978	William Garden	US Yachts		
Vagabond 17	1976	Ron Holder	Vagabond Boats		
Vancouver 25	1983	Robert B. Harris	Vancouver 25 Yacht Company		
Vancouver 36 (Harris)	1977	Robert B. Harris	Durbeck's Inc; Hidden Harbor Boatworks		
Venture 21	1966	Roger MacGregor	MacGregor Yacht Corporation		
Venture 22	1968	Roger MacGregor	MacGregor Yacht Corporation		
Venture 222	1971	Roger MacGregor	MacGregor Yacht Corporation		
Venture of Newport 23	1973	Roger MacGregor	MacGregor Yacht Corporation		
Victoria 18	1977	G. William McVay	Victoria Yachts		
Viggen 23	1966	Per Brohäll	Shipyard Karlskrona; Albin Marine		
Viking 28	1968	C&C Design	Ontario Yachts		
Viking 33	1971	C&C Design	Ontario Yachts		
Viking 34	1973	C&C Design	Ontario Yachts		
Vivacity 20	1963	Peter Stevenson; Des C. Pollard	Russell Marine		
Vivacity 24	1969	Alan F. Hill	Russell Marine		
Volvo Ocean 60	1992	Development class			
Volvo Ocean 65	2012	Farr Yacht Design			
Volvo Open 70	2003	Development class			
Voyage 11.2	1988	Guy Ribadeau Dumas	Jeanneau		
Voyage 12.5	1987	Guy Ribadeau Dumas	Jeanneau		
Wasa 30	1979	Leif Ängemark	Wasa Marin		
Walton 25	1961	Tord Sundén	Whitby Boat Works		
Watkins 17	1975	Watkins Yachts	Watkins Yachts		
Watkins 23	1973	Johannes "Jopie" Helsen	Watkins Yachts		
Watkins 25	1983		Watkins Yachts		
Watkins 27	1977	Walter Scott	Watkins Yachts		
Watkins 27P	1981	Walter Scott	Watkins Yachts		
Watkins 29	1984	Walter Scott	Watkins Yachts		
Watkins 32	1982	William H. Tripp Jr	Watkins Yachts		
Watkins 33	1984	William H. Tripp Jr/Watkins Yachts	Watkins Yachts		
Watkins 36	1981	William H. Tripp Jr/Watkins Yachts	Watkins Yachts		
Watkins 36C	1981	William H. Tripp Jr/Watkins Yachts	Watkins Yachts		
Wavelength 24	1982	Paul Lindenberg	W. D. Schock Corp		
Wavelength 30	1980	Paul Lindenberg	W. D. Schock Corp		
Wavelength 35	1983	Paul Lindenberg	W. D. Schock Corp		
Westerly 22	1963	Denys Rayner	Westerly Marine Construction		
West Wight Potter 15	1979	Stanley T. Smith and Herb Stewart	International Marine		
Weekender 24	1965	Sparkman & Stephens	Tidewater Boats		
West Wight Potter 19	1971	Herb Stewart	International Marine		
Westwind 24	1966	Ted Hood	Paceship Yachts		
Wilderness 38	1979	Gary Mull	Wilderness Yachts		
Wilderness 40	1980	Gary Mull	Wilderness Yachts		
Wild Wind 20	1982		Gale Force Yachts		
Windrose 5.5	1977	W. Shad Turner	Laguna Yachts		
Windrose 18	1974	W. Shad Turner	Laguna Yachts		
Windrose 20	1977	Ron Holder	Laguna Yachts		
Windrose 22	1977	W. Shad Turner	Laguna Yachts		
Windrose 24	1974	W. Shad Turner	Laguna Yachts		
Windrose 26	1982	W. Shad Turner	Laguna Yachts		
Worldcruiser 44	1980	Bud Taplin	Worldcruiser Yacht Company		
Wylie Wabbit 24	1982	Thomas Wylie	North Coast Yachts		
X-332	1990s	Niels Jeppesen	X-Yachts		
X-362	1990s	Niels Jeppesen	X-Yachts		
X-35	2000s	Niels Jeppesen	X-Yachts		
X-41	2000s	Niels Jeppesen	X-Yachts		
X-79	1979	Niels Jeppesen	X-Yachts		
XC-38	2010s	Niels Jeppesen	X-Yachts		
XP-33	2010s	Niels Jeppesen	X-Yachts		
XP-44	2010s	Niels Jeppesen	X-Yachts		
Yankee 26	1974	Sparkman & Stephens	Yankee Yachts		
Yankee 38	1978	Sparkman & Stephens	Yankee Yachts		
Yamaha 26	1979	Yamaha Design Team	Yamaha Motor Company		
Ylva	1979	Steen Kjølhede	Kjølhede Båd		

== See also ==
- Classic dinghy classes
- List of boat types
- List of historical ship types
- List of keelboat classes designed before 1970
- Olympic sailing classes
- Small-craft sailing
