= Tylercraft 24 =

American recreational keelboat

Development
- Designer: Ted Tyler
- Location: United States
- Year: 1961
- Builder: Tylercraft
- Role: Cruiser
- Name: Tylercraft 24

Boat
- Displacement: 4,000 lb (1,814 kg)
- Draft: 2.00 ft (0.61 m)

Hull
- Type: monohull
- Construction: fiberglass
- LOA: 24.00 ft (7.32 m)
- LWL: 20.00 ft (6.10 m)
- Beam: 7.42 ft (2.26 m)
- Engine: outboard motor

Hull appendages
- Keel: twin keels
- Ballast: 1,450 lb (658 kg)
- Rudder: skeg-mounted rudder

Rig
- Rig type: Bermuda rig

Sails
- Sailplan: masthead sloop
- Total sail area: 243.00 sq ft (22.575 m^{2})

The Tylercraft 24 is a recreational keelboat built by Tylercraft in the United States, starting in 1961 and ending about 1980.

The fiberglass hull has a spooned raked stem, a nearly-plumb transom, a skeg-mounted rudder controlled by a tiller and a fixed fin keel or twin bilge keels. There were several different models marketed over time, including a daysailer, weekend cruiser and a racer. Displacements varied from model to model, but typical is 4,000 lb (1,814 kg) with 1,450 lb (658 kg) of iron ballast. The boat has a draft of 2.00 ft (0.61 m) with the standard twin keels and 3.75 ft (1.14 m) with the optional fin keel. There was also a centerboard version, with a draft of 3.75 ft (1.14 m) with the centerboard extended and 2.00 ft (0.61 m) with it retracted. The boat is normally fitted with a small outboard motor mounted in astern well. Starting in 1965, some boats were equipped with an inboard Wankel engine. The design has a hull speed of 6.0 kn (11.1 km/h).

The interior design varied from year to year. A typical layout has sleeping accommodation for four people, with a double "V"-berth in the bow cabin and two straight settee berths in the main cabin. The galley is located on the port side amidships and is equipped with a sink. The head is located opposite the galley on the starboard side. Cabin headroom is 72 in (183 cm).

It has a masthead sloop rig.
