= Sun Odyssey 32.1 =

Sailboat class

Development
- Designer: Philippe Briand
- Location: France
- Year: 1994
- No. built: 60
- Builder: Jeanneau
- Role: Cruiser

Boat
- Displacement: 7,936 lb (3,600 kg)
- Draft: 6.40 ft (1.95 m)

Hull
- Type: monohull
- Construction: fiberglass
- LOA: 31.17 ft (9.50 m)
- LWL: 26.41 ft (8.05 m)
- Beam: 10.82 ft (3.30 m)
- Engine: Volvo MD2020 20 hp (15 kW) diesel engine

Hull appendages
- Keel: fin keel
- Ballast: 2,381 lb (1,080 kg)
- Rudder: spade-type rudder

Rig
- Rig type: Bermuda rig
- I foretriangle height: 38.06 ft (11.60 m)
- J foretriangle base: 10.60 ft (3.23 m)
- P mainsail luff: 31.82 ft (9.70 m)
- E mainsail foot: 11.81 ft (3.60 m)

Sails
- Sailplan: fractional rigged sloop
- Mainsail area: 187.90 sq ft (17.456 m^{2})
- Jib/genoa area: 201.72 sq ft (18.740 m^{2})
- Total sail area: 389.62 sq ft (36.197 m^{2})

Racing
- PHRF: 136

The Sun Odyssey 32.1 is a French sailboat that was designed by Philippe Briand as a cruiser and first built in 1994.

The design is sometimes confused withe the later 2004 Sun Odyssey 32.

== Production ==
The design was built by Jeanneau in France, from 1994 to 1998, with 60 boats completed, but it is now out of production.

== Design ==
The Sun Odyssey 32.1 is a recreational keelboat, built predominantly of fiberglass, with a balsa-cored deck and with wooden trim. The boat interior has varnished teak decor with a teak and holly cabin sole.

It has a fractional sloop rig, a nearly plumb stem, a reverse transom with a swimming platform, an internally mounted spade-type rudder controlled by a wheel and a fixed fin keel or optional shoal-draft keel. It displaces 7,936 lb (3,600 kg) and carries 2,381 lb (1,080 kg) of iron ballast.

The boat has a draft of 6.40 ft (1.95 m) with the standard keel and 4.75 ft (1.45 m) with the optional shoal draft keel.

The boat is fitted with a Swedish Volvo MD2020 diesel engine of 20 hp (15 kW) for docking and maneuvering. The fuel tank holds 12 U.S. gallons (45 L; 10.0 imp gal) and the fresh water tank has a capacity of 42 U.S. gallons (160 L; 35 imp gal).

The design has a hull speed of 6.89 kn (12.76 km/h) and a PHRF handicap of 136.

== See also ==
- List of sailing boat types
