= Tiger 25 =

1970s British recreational keebloat

Development
- Designer: John A. Butler
- Location: United Kingdom
- Year: 1969
- No. built: 284
- Builder: Westerly Marine Construction
- Role: Cruiser
- Name: Tiger 25

Boat
- Displacement: 5,264 lb (2,388 kg)
- Draft: 4.25 ft (1.30 m)

Hull
- Type: monohull
- Construction: glassfibre
- LOA: 25.08 ft (7.64 m)
- LWL: 21.83 ft (6.65 m)
- Beam: 8.75 ft (2.67 m)
- Engine: Volvo MD1B 10 hp (7 kW) diesel engine

Hull appendages
- Keel: fin keel
- Ballast: 2,240 lb (1,016 kg)
- Rudder: internally-mounted spade-type rudder

Rig
- Rig type: Bermuda rig
- I foretriangle height: 32.50 ft (9.91 m)
- J foretriangle base: 10.10 ft (3.08 m)
- P mainsail luff: 28.00 ft (8.53 m)
- E mainsail foot: 11.00 ft (3.35 m)

Sails
- Sailplan: masthead sloop
- Mainsail area: 154.00 sq ft (14.307 m^{2})
- Jib/genoa area: 164.13 sq ft (15.248 m^{2})
- Total sail area: 318.13 sq ft (29.555 m^{2})

Racing
- PHRF: 225

The Tiger 25 is a recreational keelboat built by Westerly Marine Construction in the United Kingdom between 1969 and 1976, with 284 boats completed.

The glassfibre hull has a plumb transom, an internally mounted spade-type rudder controlled by a wheel. It has a hull speed of 6.3 kn (11.7 km/h).

It has five berths. The galley is located on the port side just forward of the companionway ladder. The galley is equipped with a stove and a sink. The head is located in the bow cabin on the starboard side. Cabin headroom is 63 in (160 cm).

It has a masthead sloop rig.
