= Sun Odyssey 32.2 =

Sailboat class

Development
- Designer: Jacques Fauroux
- Location: France
- Year: 1998
- Builder: Jeanneau
- Role: Cruiser

Boat
- Displacement: 8,929 lb (4,050 kg)
- Draft: 4.76 ft (1.45 m)

Hull
- Type: monohull
- Construction: fiberglass
- LOA: 31.17 ft (9.50 m)
- LWL: 26.97 ft (8.22 m)
- Beam: 9.84 ft (3.00 m)
- Engine: Volvo 18 hp (13 kW) diesel engine

Hull appendages
- Keel: fin keel with weighted bulb
- Ballast: 3,020 lb (1,370 kg)
- Rudder: spade-type rudder

Rig
- Rig type: Bermuda rig
- I foretriangle height: 39.37 ft (12.00 m)
- J foretriangle base: 11.22 ft (3.42 m)
- P mainsail luff: 33.79 ft (10.30 m)
- E mainsail foot: 10.99 ft (3.35 m)

Sails
- Sailplan: masthead sloop
- Mainsail area: 185.68 sq ft (17.250 m^{2})
- Jib/genoa area: 220.87 sq ft (20.519 m^{2})
- Total sail area: 406.54 sq ft (37.769 m^{2})

The Sun Odyssey 32.2 is a French sailboat that was designed by Jacques Fauroux as a cruiser and first built in 1998.

== Production ==
The design was built by Jeanneau in France, from 1988 to 2002, but it is now out of production.

== Design ==
The Sun Odyssey 32.2 is a recreational keelboat, built predominantly of fiberglass, with wood trim. It has a masthead sloop rig, with a single set of swept spreaders and aluminum spars with stainless steel wire rigging. The hull has a raked stem, a reverse transom with steps, an internally mounted spade-type rudder controlled by a wheel and a fixed fin keel or optional lifting keel. It displaces 8,929 lb (4,050 kg) and carries 3,020 lb (1,370 kg) of ballast in the fin keel model and carries 3,417 lb (1,550 kg) of ballast in the lifting keel version.

The fin keel-equipped version of the boat has a draft of 4.76 ft (1.45 m), while the lifting keel-equipped version has a draft of 5.25 ft (1.60 m) with the keel extended and 2.5 ft (0.76 m) with it retracted, allowing operation in shallow water.

The boat is fitted with a Swedish Volvo diesel engine of 18 hp (13 kW) for docking and maneuvering. The fuel tank holds 12 U.S. gallons (45 L; 10.0 imp gal) and the fresh water tank has a capacity of 37 U.S. gallons (140 L; 31 imp gal).

The design has sleeping accommodation for four people, with a double "V"-berth in the bow cabin, two slightly curved settees in the main cabin around a drop-leaf table and an aft cabin with a double berth on the port side. The galley is located on the port side just forward of the companionway ladder. The galley is L-shaped and is equipped with a two-burner stove, an ice box and a sink. A navigation station is opposite the galley, on the starboard side. The head is located aft on the starboard side. The interior is finished in teak and the cabin headroom is 71 in (180 cm)

The design has a hull speed of 6.96 kn (12.89 km/h).

== See also ==
- List of sailing boat types
