= Sonic 23 =

1980s Canadian recreational keelboat

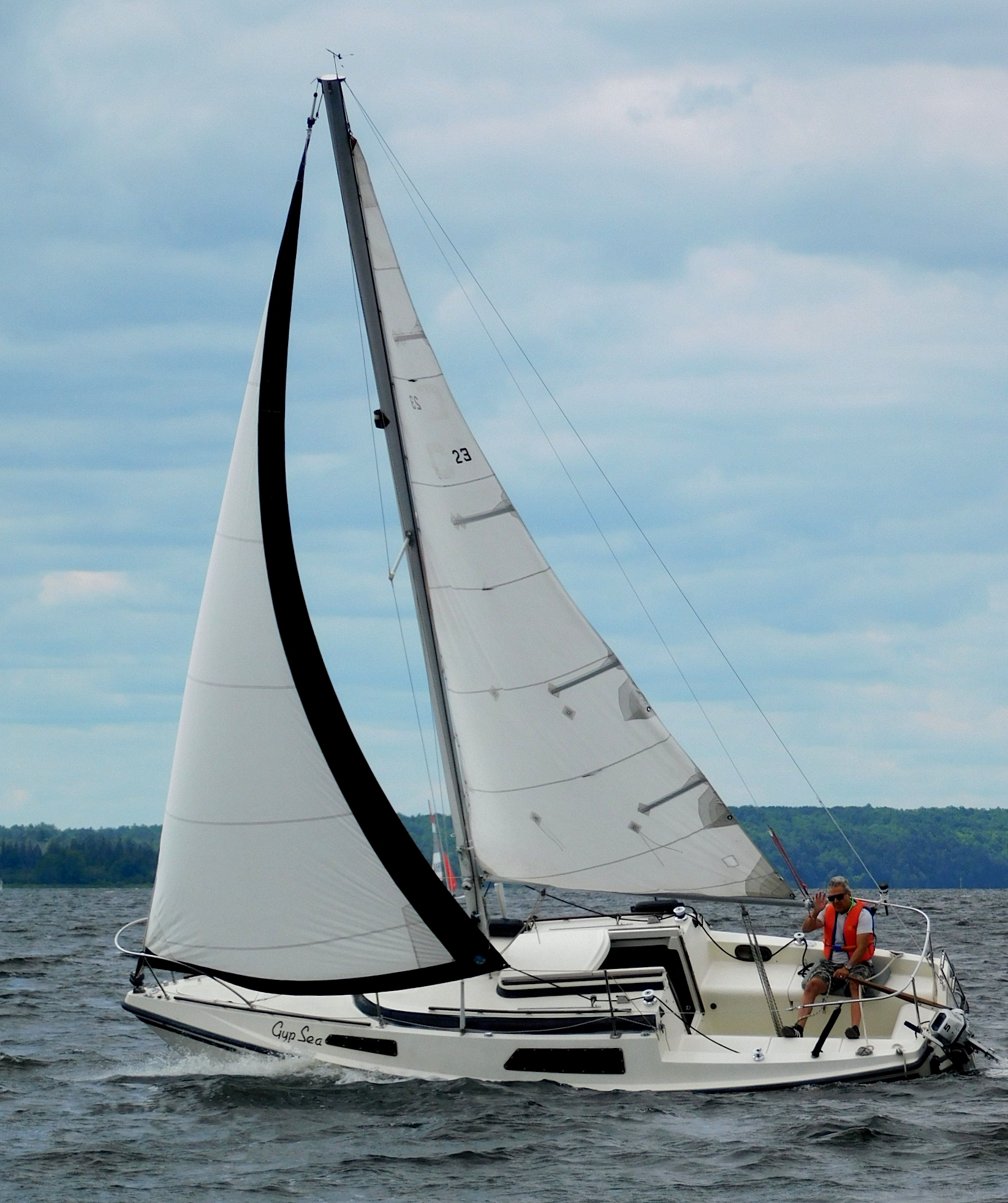

Development
- Designer: Joseph D'Alessio
- Location: Canada
- Year: 1981
- Builder: Sonic Sailboats Limited
- Name: Sonic 23

Boat
- Displacement: 3,400 lb (1,542 kg)
- Draft: 3.75 ft (1.14 m)

Hull
- Type: Monohull
- Construction: Fibreglass
- LOA: 23.00 ft (7.01 m)
- LWL: 20.00 ft (6.10 m)
- Beam: 7.58 ft (2.31 m)
- Engine: outboard motor

Hull appendages
- Keel: fin keel
- Ballast: 1,500 lb (680 kg)
- Rudder: transom-mounted rudder

Rig
- General: Masthead sloop
- I foretriangle height: 27.00 ft (8.23 m)
- J foretriangle base: 10.00 ft (3.05 m)
- P mainsail luff: 23.00 ft (7.01 m)
- E mainsail foot: 9.30 ft (2.83 m)

Sails
- Mainsail area: 106.95 sq ft (9.936 m^{2})
- Jib/genoa area: 135.00 sq ft (12.542 m^{2})
- Total sail area: 241.95 sq ft (22.478 m^{2})

Racing
- PHRF: 228 (average)

The Sonic 23 is a recreational keelboat designed by Joseph D'Alessio and first built in 1981.

== Production ==
The boat was built by Sonic Sailboats Limited in Canada starting in 1981, but is now out of production.

== Design ==
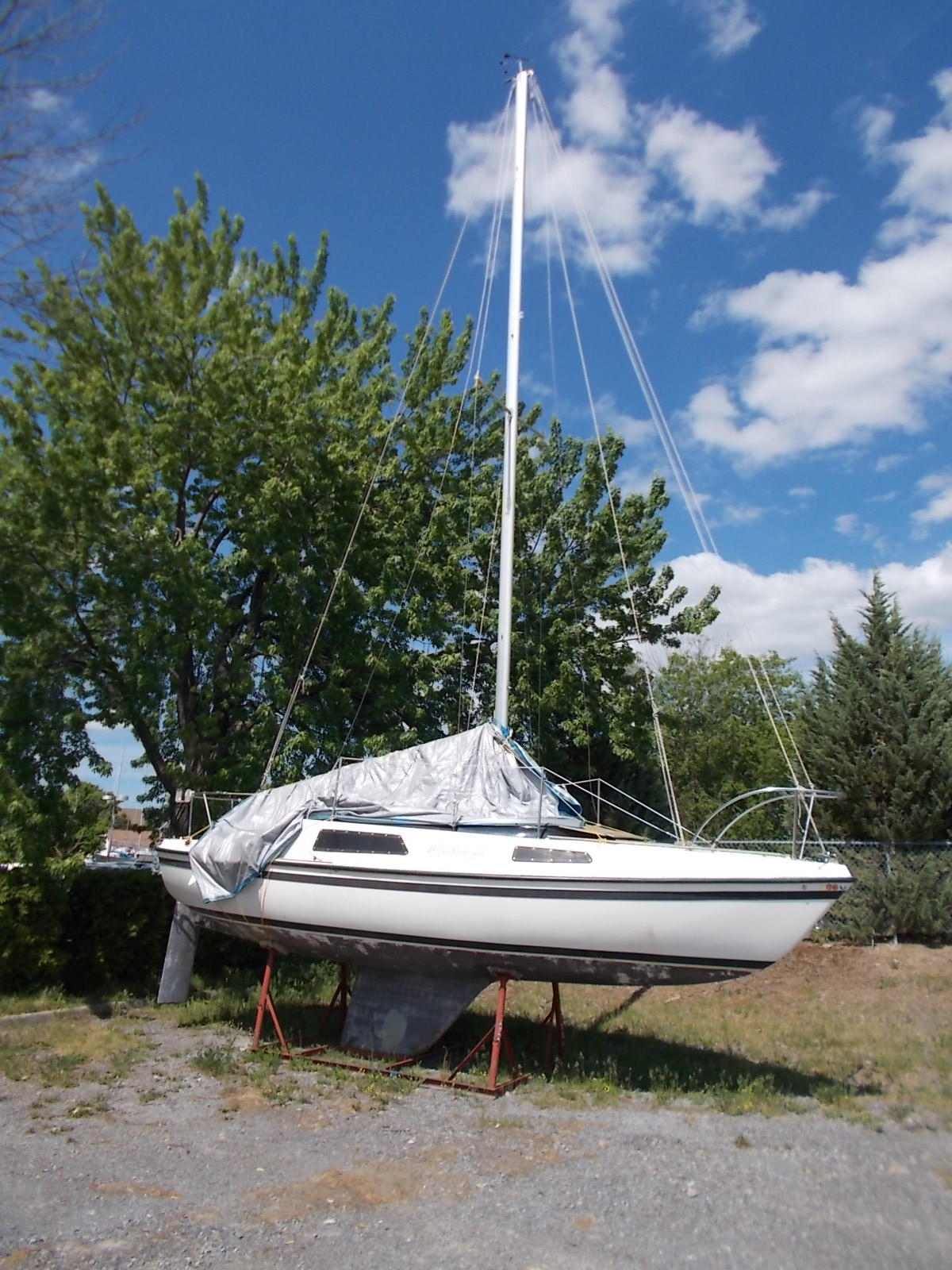
Sonic 23 on its cradle showing the keel configuration

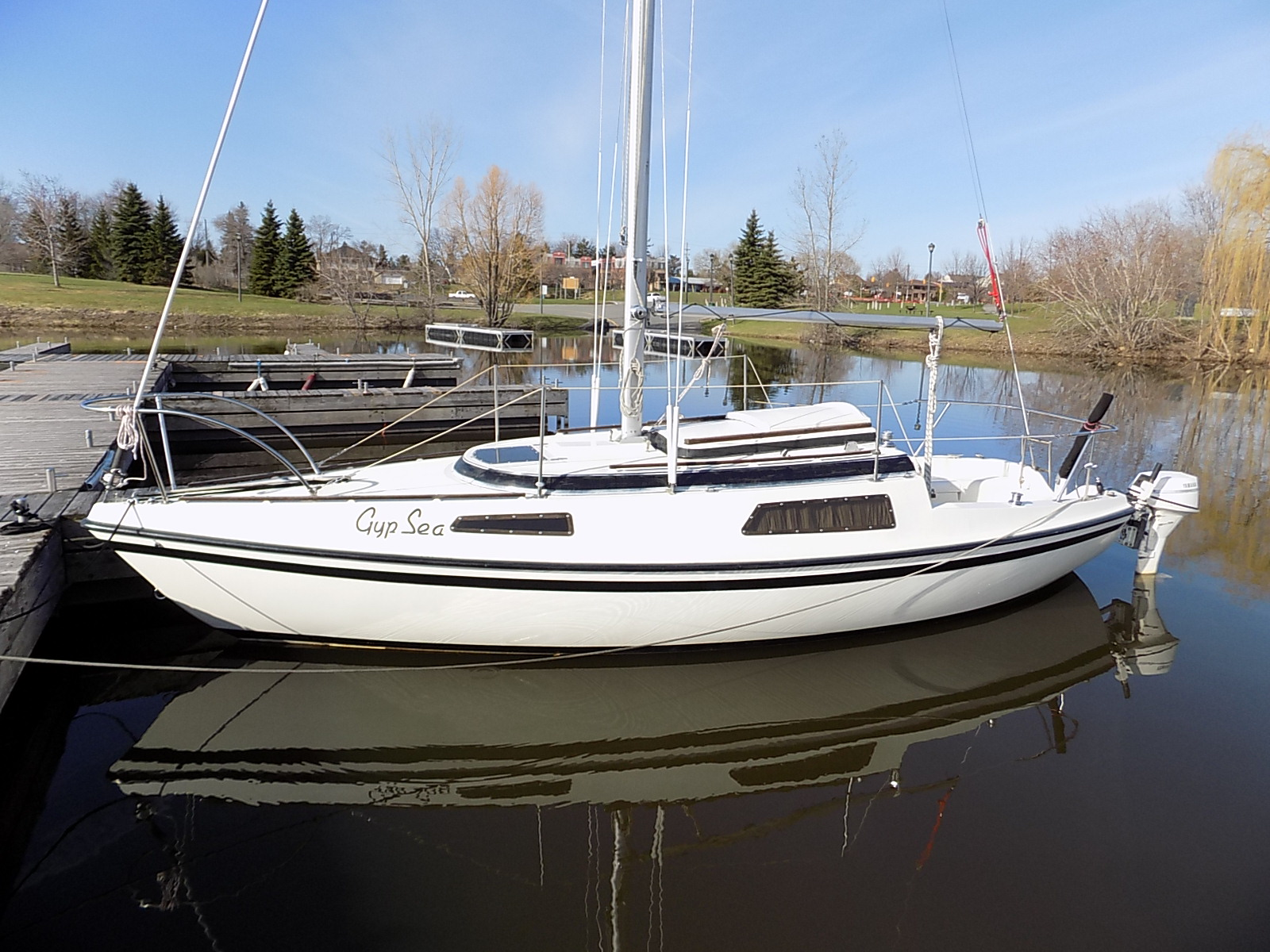
Sonic 23

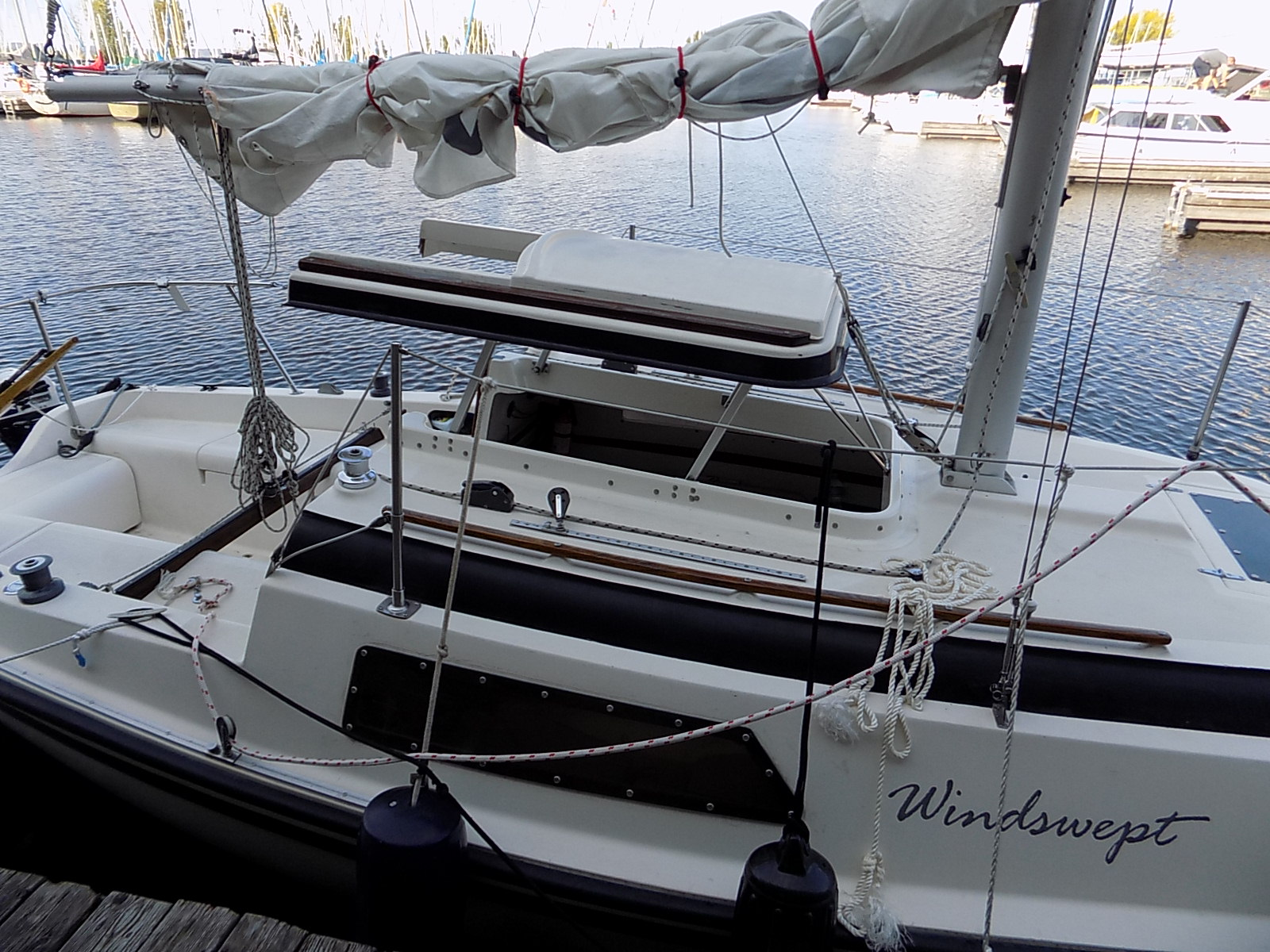
A Sonic 23 sailboat showing the "pop-up" companion way hatch cover in its extended position.

The Sonic 23 is a small recreational keelboat, built predominantly of fibreglass, with wood trim. It has a masthead sloop rig, a transom-hung rudder and a fixed fin keel. It also has a pop-up companionway hatch. It displaces 3,400 lb (1,542 kg) and carries 1,500 lb (680 kg) of iron ballast.

The boat has a draft of 3.75 ft (1.14 m) with the standard keel. It has provisions for an outboard motor.

The boat has a PHRF racing average handicap of 228 with a high of 240 and low of 225. It has a hull speed of 5.99 kn (11.09 km/h).

== Operational history ==
In a review Michael McGoldrick wrote, "Many people regard the Sonic as a close approximation of the very popular Tanzer 22, and the hull and sail plan of these two boats are believed to be very similar. However, the Sonic 23 was designed from scratch by Joseph D'Alessio, and it comes with a sightly larger cabin with a better layout. (It has sitting headroom which increases to 6' with the pop top.). The Sonic's interior room may give it the edge over the Tanzer 22 which is known for being a good sailing boat, but which suffers from cabin which appears a little cramped. From this perspective, the Sonic may be a better choice for cruising."
