= Sun Fast 43 =

Sailboat class

Development
- Designer: Daniel Andrieu
- Location: France
- Year: 2003
- Builder: Jeanneau
- Role: Racer-Cruiser

Boat
- Displacement: 20,282 lb (9,200 kg)
- Draft: 8.37 ft (2.55 m)

Hull
- Type: monohull
- Construction: fiberglass
- LOA: 43.34 ft (13.21 m)
- LWL: 37.50 ft (11.43 m)
- Beam: 13.75 ft (4.19 m)
- Engine: Yanmar 80 hp (60 kW) diesel engine

Hull appendages
- Keel: fin keel with weighted bulb
- Ballast: 6,173 lb (2,800 kg)
- Rudder: spade-type rudder

Rig
- Rig type: Bermuda rig
- I foretriangle height: 57.48 ft (17.52 m)
- J foretriangle base: 15.55 ft (4.74 m)
- P mainsail luff: 53.48 ft (16.30 m)
- E mainsail foot: 18.37 ft (5.60 m)

Sails
- Sailplan: masthead sloop
- Mainsail area: 491.21 sq ft (45.635 m^{2})
- Jib/genoa area: 446.91 sq ft (41.519 m^{2})
- Total sail area: 938.12 sq ft (87.154 m^{2})

The Sun Fast 43 is a French sailboat that was designed by Daniel Andrieu as a blue water racer-cruiser and first built in 2003. It has also been employed for yacht charter.

== Production ==
The design was built by Jeanneau in France, starting in 2003, but it is now out of production.

== Design ==
The Sun Fast 43 is a recreational keelboat, built predominantly of fiberglass, with wood trim. It has a masthead sloop rig, with a slightly raked stem, a reverse transom with a swimming platform, an internally mounted spade-type rudder controlled by dual wheels and a fixed fin keel. It displaces 20,282 lb (9,200 kg) and carries 6,173 lb (2,800 kg) of ballast.

The boat has a draft of 8.37 ft (2.55 m) with the standard keel.

The boat is fitted with a Japanese Yanmar diesel engine of 80 hp (60 kW) for docking and maneuvering. The fuel tank holds 53 U.S. gallons (200 L; 44 imp gal) and the fresh water tank has a capacity of 106 U.S. gallons (400 L; 88 imp gal).

The design has three and four-cabin interior configurations, which provide sleeping accommodation for five to seven people. There is a double "V"-berth in the bow cabin, a smaller single cabin in the starboard bow, a U-shaped settee and a straight settee in the main cabin and an aft cabin with a double berth on the port side. The aft cabin may be split to form a fourth cabin. The galley is located on the starboard side just forward of the companionway ladder. The galley is L-shaped and is equipped with a stove, an ice box and a double sink. A navigation station is opposite the galley, on the port side. There are two heads, one just aft of the bow cabin on the port side and one on the port side, opposite the galley.

For sailing downwind the design may be equipped with a symmetrical spinnaker. The boat has a hull speed of 8.21 kn (15.20 km/h).

== Operational history ==
The boat was at one time supported by a class club that organized racing events, the Sun Fast Association.

In a 2004 review for Yacht and Boat, Barry Tranter wrote, "the boat is quick, fully fitted out, comfortable, and it rates well, so the range of the boats abilities is wide. If performance is one of the requirements on your checklist, the Sun Fast 43 should be able to satisfy most of your other sailing requirements as well."

== See also ==
- List of sailing boat types
