= Spindrift 22 =

1980s American trailer sailer

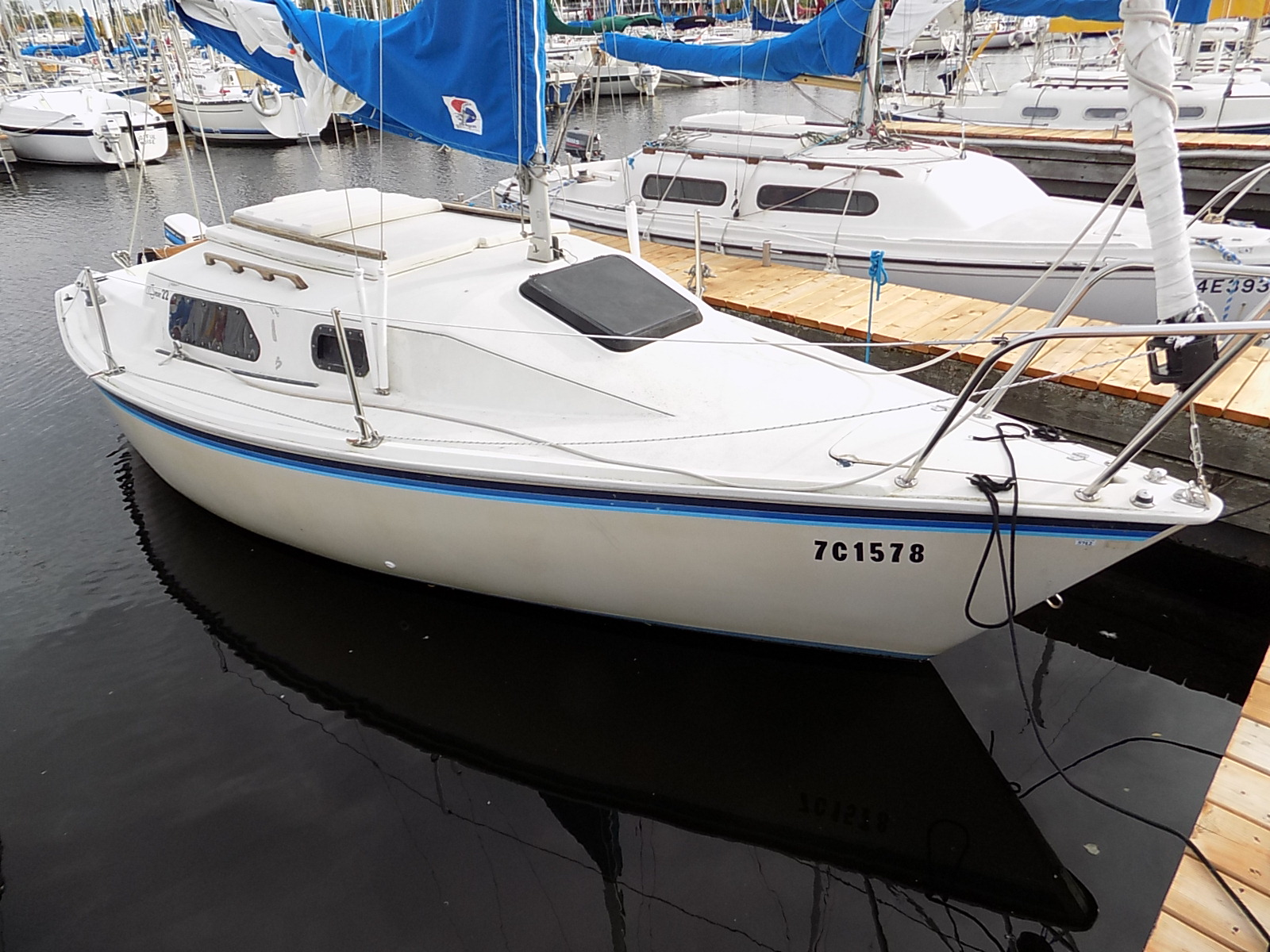

Development
- Designer: Jim Taylor Yacht Designs
- Location: United States
- Year: 1982
- No. built: 400
- Builder: Rebel Industries
- Name: Spindrift 22

Boat
- Displacement: 1,990 lb (903 kg)
- Draft: 4.67 ft (1.42 m) with centerboard down

Hull
- Type: Monohull
- Construction: Fiberglass
- LOA: 21.50 ft (6.55 m)
- LWL: 19.08 ft (5.82 m)
- Beam: 8.16 ft (2.49 m)
- Engine: Outboard motor

Hull appendages
- Keel: centerboard
- Ballast: 600 lb (272 kg)
- Rudder: transom-mounted rudder

Rig
- Rig type: Bermuda rig
- I foretriangle height: 25.60 ft (7.80 m)
- J foretriangle base: 7.50 ft (2.29 m)
- P mainsail luff: 21.40 ft (6.52 m)
- E mainsail foot: 9.20 ft (2.80 m)

Sails
- Sailplan: Masthead sloop
- Mainsail area: 98.44 sq ft (9.145 m^{2})
- Jib/genoa area: 96.00 sq ft (8.919 m^{2})
- Total sail area: 194.44 sq ft (18.064 m^{2})

Racing
- PHRF: 243 (average)

The Spindrift 22 is an American trailerable sailboat that was designed by Jim Taylor Yacht Designs and first built in 1982.

The Spindrift 22 is a development of the Spectrum 22, which was built by Spectrum Yachts in Florida.

== Production ==
The design was built by Rebel Industries in the United States between 1982 and 1987, with 400 examples of the type completed.

== Design ==
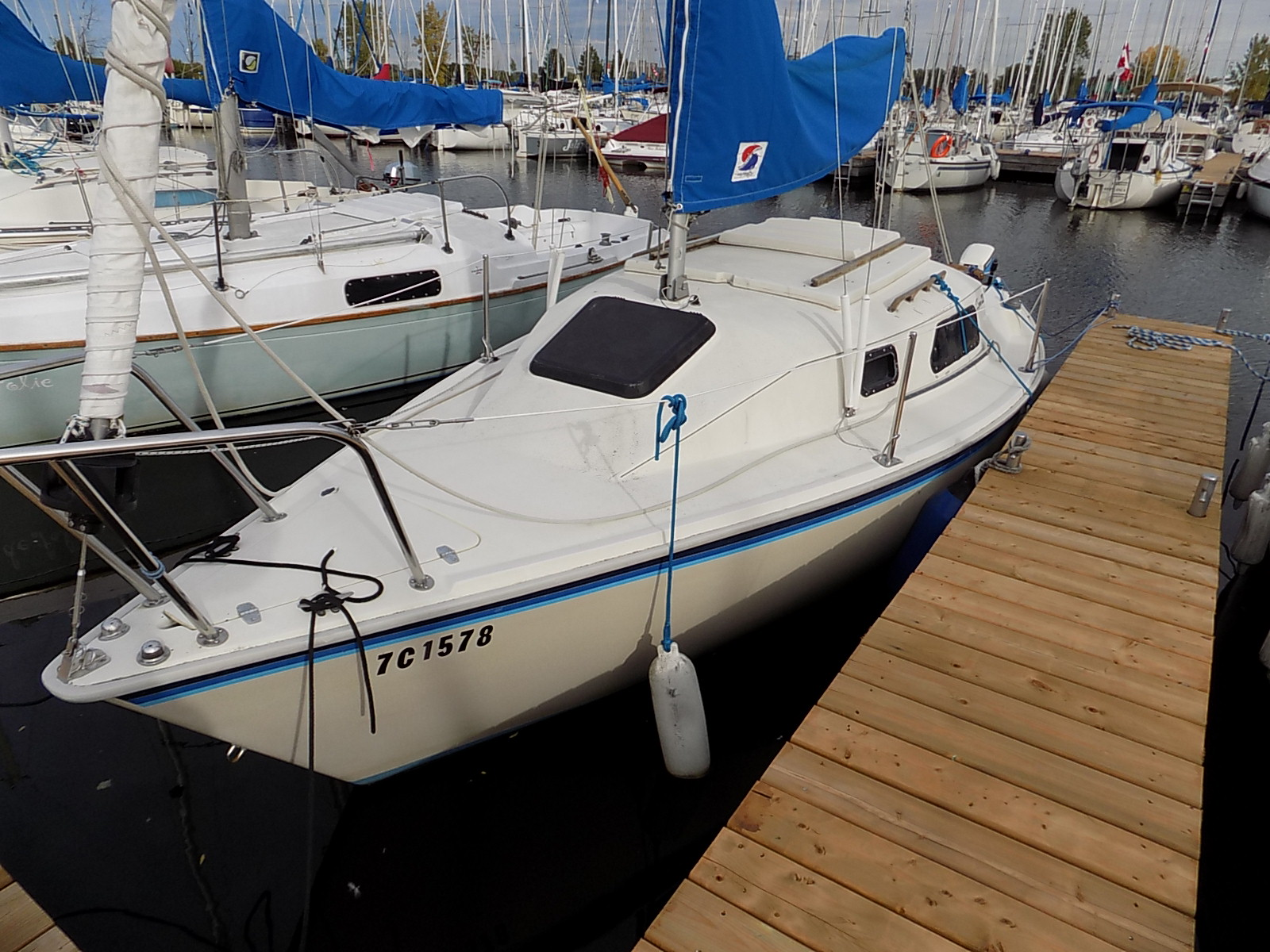
Spindrift 22

The Spindrift 22 is a small recreational keelboat, built predominantly of fiberglass, with wood trim. It has a masthead sloop rig, a raked stem, a nearly vertical transom, a transom-hung rudder controlled by a tiller and a fixed stub keel, with a centerboard. It displaces 1,990 lb (903 kg) and carries 600 lb (272 kg) of ballast.

The boat has a draft of 4.67 ft (1.42 m) with the centreboard extended and 1.50 ft (0.46 m) with it retracted, allowing beaching or ground transportation on a trailer.

The boat is normally fitted with a small 3 to 6 hp (2 to 4 kW) outboard motor for docking and maneuvering.

The design has sleeping accommodation for four people, with a double "V"-berth in the bow cabin and two straight settee berths in the main cabin. The galley is located on the starboard side just aft of the bow cabin. The galley is equipped with a sink. The head is located just aft of the bow cabin on the port side. Cabin headroom is 56 in (142 cm).

The design has a PHRF racing average handicap of 243 with a high of 234 and low of 252. It has a hull speed of 5.85 kn (10.83 km/h).

== Operational history ==
In a 2010 review Steve Henkel wrote, "The concept was to build a safe, giving boat for a family of four, fun to sail and with some elbow room in the interior. Jim Taylor’s cozy and efficient layout on the original design is shown. When Spectrum left scene, Rebel Industries bought the molds and revised the interior (without consulting the designer) and continued building the boat under the Starwind and then the Spindrift name ... Best features: As with Jim Taylor's other designs, this one is wholesome and well-balanced, and fulfills her design concept nicely."
