= Skipper 20 =

1970s US recreational keelboat

Development
- Location: United States
- Year: 1978
- Builder: Southern Sails

Boat
- Displacement: 2,000 lb (907 kg)
- Draft: 2.00 ft (0.61 m)

Hull
- Type: monohull
- Construction: fiberglass
- LOA: 20.00 ft (6.10 m)
- LWL: 15.00 ft (4.57 m)
- Beam: 6.67 ft (2.03 m)
- Engine: outboard motor

Hull appendages
- Keel: shoal draft fin keel
- Ballast: 800 lb (363 kg)
- Rudder: transom-mounted rudder

Rig
- Rig type: Bermuda rig

Sails
- Sailplan: fractional rigged sloop
- Total sail area: 143.00 sq ft (13.285 m^{2})

The Skipper 20 is a recreational keelboat first built by Southern Sails in the United States, from 1978 until 1981.

== Design ==
The Skipper 20 is built predominantly of fiberglass, with wood trim and simulated lapstrake construction. It has a fractional sloop rig, canoe hull with a raked stem, a rounded transom, a transom-hung rudder controlled by a tiller and a fixed fin keel. It was produced in two versions, one with a standard cabin and the other with a cuddy cabin.

The boat has a draft of 2.00 ft (0.61 m) with the standard shoal draft keel.

The boat is normally fitted with a small 3 to 6 hp (2 to 4 kW) well-mounted outboard motor for docking and maneuvering.

The design has sleeping accommodation for two people, with a double "V"-berth in the bow. The portable-type head is located under the "V"-berth. Cabin headroom is 54 in (137 cm).

The design has a hull speed of 5.2 kn (9.6 km/h).

== Variants ==
Skipper 20
This cabin model displaces 2,000 lb (907 kg) and carries 800 lb (363 kg) of ballast. With its bowsprit it has a length overall of 20.00 ft (6.10 m).
Skipper 20 Cuddy
This model displaces 1,900 lb (862 kg) and carries 800 lb (363 kg) of ballast. Lacking a bowsprit, it has a length overall of 18.75 ft (5.72 m).

== Reception ==
In a 2010 review Steve Henkel wrote, "this is a character boat of a type attractive to people who think that a sailboat hull shaped like a lifeboat is safer than a hull with a normal transom, In reality, it isn't, at least in a vessel this small. Best features: Compared with her comp[etitor]s, the Skipper 20 has a larger cockpit, with a convenient outboard engine in a well under a hatch just ahead of the rudder, and her simulated lapstrake topsides give her a jaunty antique look. Worst features: Perhaps the designer (who is unidentified in the literature we've seen) expected all skippers to spend most of their time under power. That seems a likely possibility considering the boat's pitifully short mast and tiny sails—exacerbated by a main boom which is needlessly high on the mast. Moreover, the stubby keel is too shallow to keep the boat from side-slipping under sail, and for reasons we can't fathom, the rudder is much too small for effective steering while sailing ..."
