= Nimble 20 =

1980s US recreational keelboat

Development
- Designer: Edward S. Brewer
- Location: United States
- Year: 1986
- Builder: Nimble Boats

Boat
- Displacement: 2,600 lb (1,179 kg)
- Draft: 4.08 ft (1.24 m) with centerboard down

Hull
- Type: monohull
- Construction: fiberglass
- LOA: 20.83 ft (6.35 m)
- LWL: 19.75 ft (6.02 m)
- Beam: 7.75 ft (2.36 m)
- Engine: outboard motor

Hull appendages
- Keel: stub keel with centerboard
- Ballast: 600 lb (272 kg)
- Rudder: transom-mounted rudder

Rig
- Rig type: Ketch

Sails
- Sailplan: fractional rigged ketch
- Total sail area: 207.00 sq ft (19.231 m^{2})

Racing
- PHRF: 288

The Nimble 20 is a recreational keelboat built by Nimble Boats in the United States from 1986 until about 1991, but it is now out of production.

== Design ==
The Nimble 20 is a built predominantly of fiberglass, with wood trim. It has a fractional ketch rig, a canoe hull, a rounded plumb stem, an angled transom, a transom-hung rudder controlled by a tiller and a fixed stub keel with a retractable centerboard. It displaces 2,600 lb (1,179 kg) and carries 600 lb (272 kg) of ballast.

The boat has a draft of 4.08 ft (1.24 m) with the centerboard extended and 0.92 ft (0.28 m) with it retracted, allowing beaching or ground transportation on a trailer.

The boat is normally fitted with a small well-mounted 3 to 6 hp (2 to 4 kW) outboard motor for docking and maneuvering.

The design has sleeping accommodation for four people, with a double "V"-berth in the bow cabin and two straight settees in the main cabin. The head is located in the bow cabin on the starboard side. Cabin headroom is 51 in (130 cm).

The design has a PHRF racing average handicap of 288 and a hull speed of 6.0 kn (11.1 km/h).

== Reception ==
In a 2010 review Steve Henkel wrote, "...you can sail in strong winds without the main, under jib and 'jigger' (ie., the mizzen). You can control any tendency of the boat to dance around her mooring by hoisting the mizzen alone. You can sometimes balance the helm of an otherwise finicky boat by fine-tuning the mizzen sheet along with the centerboard ... Best features: Her traditional looks appeal to us ... Worst features: Her PHRF is at the high end, indicating that her overall speed potential is below that of her comp[etitor]s, despite her high-end [hull speed] due to her long waterline. Her speed performance under sail compared to comp[etitor]s is probably a result of a combination of small sail area, split rig, and her hard chine bull shape, which tends to pound a bit in a chop."
