= Swan 100 =

Finnish sailboat design

Development
- Designer: German Frers
- Location: Finland
- Year: 2002
- No. built: FD 3 RS 1 S 2
- Brand: Swan
- Builder: Nautor Swan OY
- Role: Cruising
- Name: Swan 100

Boat
- Displacement: 72,000 kg (159,000 lb)
- Draft: 4.02 m (13.2 ft)

Hull
- Type: Monohull
- LOH: 30.21 m (99.1 ft)
- LWL: 26.46 m (86.8 ft)
- Beam: 7.06 m (23.2 ft)
- Engine: Perkins 265 hp

Hull appendages
- Ballast: 29,000 kg (64,000 lb)

Rig
- Rig type: Masthead
- I foretriangle height: 39.55 m (129.8 ft)
- J foretriangle base: 10.7 m (35 ft)
- P mainsail luff: 36.00 m (118.11 ft)
- E mainsail foot: 12.46 m (40.9 ft)

Sails
- Sailplan: Cutter
- Mainsail area: 234.3 m^{2} (2,522 sq ft)
- Jib/genoa area: 225.3 m^{2} (2,425 sq ft)
- Luff perpendicular: 110%
- Gennaker area: 762 m^{2} (8,200 sq ft)

The Swan 100 was designed by German Frers and built by Nautor's Swan and first launched in 2002. Originally launched as th 100RS the S and FD version were later developed to use the hull moulding.
