= Snapdragon 747 =

1960s British recreational keelboat

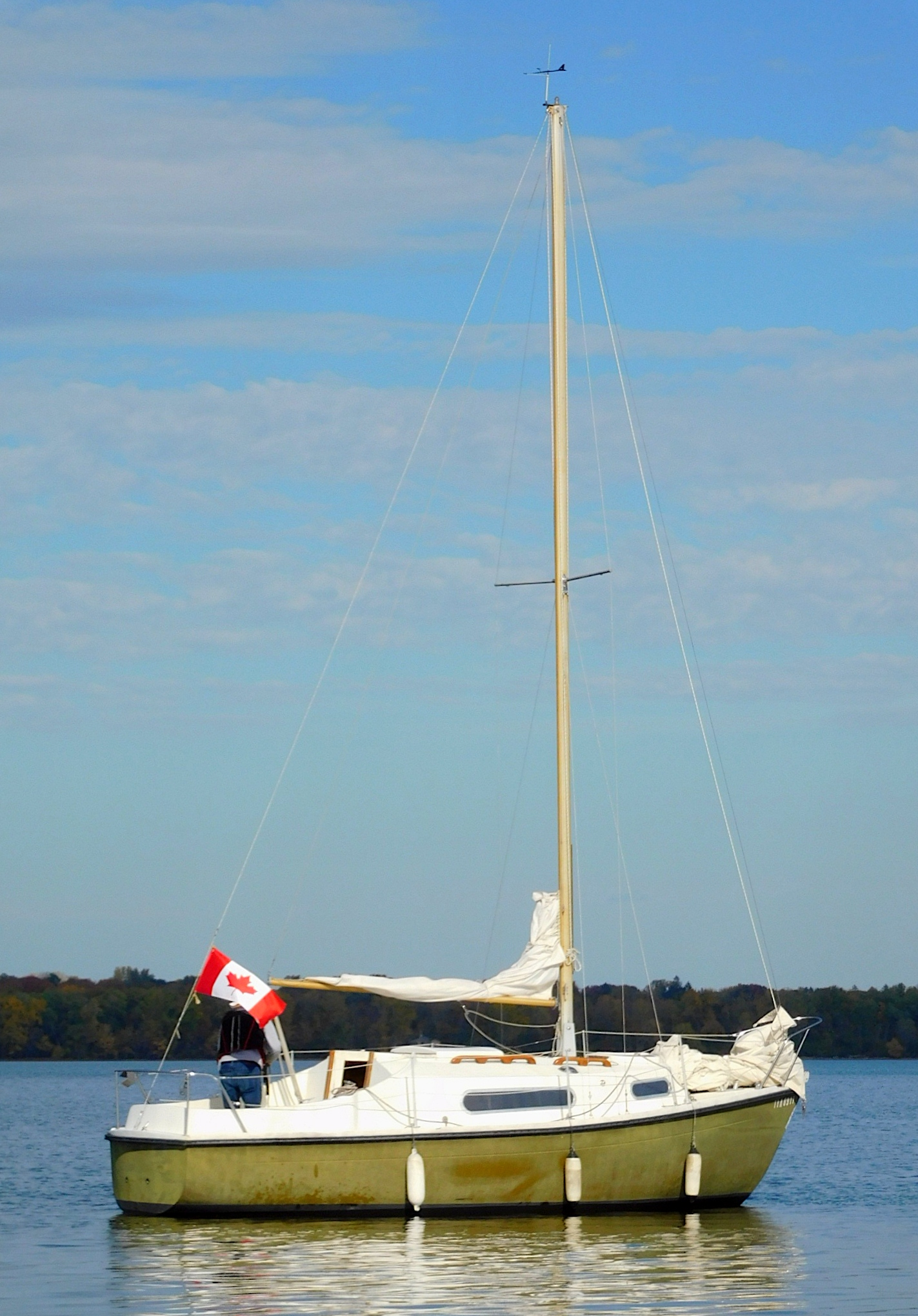

Development
- Designer: Thames Structural Plastics
- Location: United Kingdom
- Year: 1964
- No. built: 350 (1976)
- Builder: Thames Marine
- Name: Snapdragon 747

Boat
- Displacement: 3,700 lb (1,678 kg)
- Draft: 2.50 ft (0.76 m)

Hull
- Type: monohull
- Construction: glassfibre
- LOA: 24.50 ft (7.47 m)
- LWL: 20.50 ft (6.25 m)
- Beam: 8.00 ft (2.44 m)
- Engine: Yanmar YS 8 diesel engine

Hull appendages
- Keel: twin keels
- Ballast: 1,550 lb (703 kg)
- Rudder: skeg-mounted rudder

Rig
- Rig type: Bermuda rig

Sails
- Sailplan: masthead sloop

The Snapdragon 747 is a British trailerable sailboat that was designed by Thames Structural Plastics, a division of Thames Marine, as a cruiser and first built in 1964.

The Snapdragon 747 is a development of the Snapdragon 24, with a modified rig and a new skeg-mounted rudder design.

== Production ==
The design was built by Thames Marine in the United Kingdom, starting in 1964, but it is now out of production. By 1976 over 350 boats had been completed.

== Design ==
The Snapdragon 747 is a recreational keelboat, built predominantly of glassfibre, with wood trim. It has a masthead sloop rig, a raked stem, a plumb transom, a skeg-mounted rudder controlled by a tiller and fixed twin keels or an optional fin keel. It displaces 3,700 lb (1,678 kg) and carries 1,550 lb (703 kg) of ballast.

The boat has a draft of 2.50 ft (0.76 m) with the standard twin keels and 3.50 ft (1.07 m) with the optional fin keel.

The boat is fitted with a Japanese Yanmar YS 8 diesel engine for docking and manoeuvring.

The design has sleeping accommodation for four people, with a double "V"-berth in the bow cabin, an L-shaped settee in the main cabin and an aft quarter berth on the starboard side. The galley is located on the starboard side just aft of the bow cabin. The head is located just aft of the bow cabin on the port side.

The boat is supported by an active class club, the Snapdragon, Mirage and Invaders Association.
