= Vivacity 24 =

UK recreational keelboat

- V

Development
- Designer: Alan F. Hill
- Location: United Kingdom
- Year: 1969
- Builder: Russell Marine
- Role: Cruiser
- Name: Vivacity 24

Boat
- Displacement: 4,200 lb (1,905 kg)
- Draft: 3.67 ft (1.12 m)

Hull
- Type: monohull
- Construction: glassfibre
- LOA: 23.50 ft (7.16 m)
- LWL: 20.75 ft (6.32 m)
- Beam: 8.00 ft (2.44 m)
- Engine: inboard engine/outboard motor

Hull appendages
- Keel: fin keel
- Ballast: 1,750 lb (794 kg)
- Rudder: skeg-mounted rudder

Rig
- Rig type: Bermuda rig
- I foretriangle height: 24.00 ft (7.32 m)
- J foretriangle base: 9.95 ft (3.03 m)
- P mainsail luff: 21.00 ft (6.40 m)
- E mainsail foot: 10.05 ft (3.06 m)

Sails
- Sailplan: masthead sloop
- Mainsail area: 105.53 sq ft (9.804 m^{2})
- Jib/genoa area: 119.40 sq ft (11.093 m^{2})
- Total sail area: 224.93 sq ft (20.897 m^{2})

The Vivacity 24 is a recreational keelboat that was designed by Alan F. Hill as a cruiser and built by Russell Marine in the United Kingdom, starting in 1969, but it is now out of production.

The Vivacity 24 is built predominantly of glassfibre, with wood trim. It has a masthead sloop rig; a spooned, raked stem; an angled transom, a skeg-mounted rudder controlled by a tiller and a fixed fin keel or optional twin keels. It displaces 4,200 lb (1,905 kg) and carries 1,750 lb (794 kg) of iron ballast.

The boat has a draft of 3.67 ft (1.12 m) with the standard keel and 2.5 ft (0.76 m) with the optional twin keels.

The boat may be fitted with an inboard engine or a small 3 to 8 hp (2 to 6 kW) outboard motor for docking and manoeuvring.

The design has sleeping accommodation for five people, with a double "V"-berth in the bow cabin and drop-down dinette table in the main cabin. The galley is located on the port side just forward of the companionway ladder. The galley is U-shaped and is equipped with a stove and a sink. The head is located just aft of the bow cabin on the starboard side. Cabin headroom is 67 in (170 cm).

The design has a hull speed of 6.1 kn (11.3 km/h).

== Operational history ==
In a 2010 review Steve Henkel wrote, "the Vivacity 24 is a relatively heavy and somewhat under-rigged coastal cruiser. Best features: The twin keeler sails and tracks well downwind. Worst features: Several owners say their Vivacity 24s are sluggish to windward and tend to pound in a chop. They also point out that their boats are under rigged for light air sailing conditions, and can benefit from additional light weather cruising chutes and foresails to keep them moving. But fully rigged in winds above 20 knots they can develop a nasty weather helm. Moral: reef at 15 knots."

In a 2017 review Go Sail noted, "the Vivacity 24 is a small solidly built small cruiser offering good safe coastal cruising with reasonable performance and well laid out accommodation for her size."
