= Wild Wind 20 =

1980s American recreational keelboat

Development
- Location: United States
- Year: 1982
- Builder: Gale Force Yachts
- Role: Cruiser
- Name: Wild Wind 20

Boat
- Displacement: 2,200 lb (998 kg)
- Draft: 5.67 ft (1.73 m) with keel down

Hull
- Type: monohull
- Construction: fiberglass
- LOA: 20.00 ft (6.10 m)
- LWL: 18.00 ft (5.49 m)
- Beam: 7.92 ft (2.41 m)
- Engine: outboard motor

Hull appendages
- Keel: swing keel
- Ballast: 800 lb (363 kg)
- Rudder: transom-mounted rudder

Rig
- Rig type: Bermuda rig
- I foretriangle height: 25.50 ft (7.77 m)
- J foretriangle base: 8.00 ft (2.44 m)
- P mainsail luff: 21.50 ft (6.55 m)
- E mainsail foot: 6.50 ft (1.98 m)

Sails
- Sailplan: fractional rigged sloop
- Mainsail area: 69.88 sq ft (6.492 m^{2})
- Jib/genoa area: 102.00 sq ft (9.476 m^{2})
- Total sail area: 171.88 sq ft (15.968 m^{2})

The Wild Wind 20, also called the Gale Force 20 and Rinker 20, is a recreational keelboat first built in 1982 by Gale Force Yachts in Syracuse, Indiana, United States, but it is now out of production. Gale Force was the short-lived sailboat division of powerboat builder Rinkerbuilt Co., now called Rinker Boats and owned by Highwater Marine, LLC, which is a wholly owned subsidiary of Polaris Industries Inc.

== Design ==
The fiberglass hull has a raked stem, a reverse transom, a transom-hung rudder controlled by a tiller and a fixed stub keel with a lifting keel.

The design has sleeping accommodation for four people, with a double "V"-berth in the bow cabin and two straight settee berths in the main cabin. Cabin headroom is 51 in (130 cm).

The design has a hull speed of 5.7 kn (10.6 km/h).

It has a fractional rig.
