= Thames Marine Mirage 29 =

1980s recreational keelboat

Development
- Location: United Kingdom
- Year: 1983
- Builder: Thames Marine
- Name: Thames Marine Mirage 29

Boat
- Displacement: 8,267 lb (3,750 kg)
- Draft: 3.75 ft (1.14 m)

Hull
- Type: Monohull
- Construction: Fiberglass
- LOA: 28.83 ft (8.79 m)
- LWL: 25.25 ft (7.70 m)
- Beam: 10.50 ft (3.20 m)
- Engine: Volvo Penta 18 hp (13 kW) diesel engine

Hull appendages
- Keel: twin keel
- Rudders: External stern mounted, dagger type, mounted on pintails

Rig
- General: Masthead sloop

Sails
- Total sail area: 353 sq ft (32.8 m^{2})

Racing
- PHRF: 177 (average)

The Thames Marine Mirage 29 is a British sailboat, that was first built in 1983 by Thames Marine of the United Kingdom. It is now out of production.

The Thames Marine Mirage 29 design is sometimes confused with a 1986 Canadian design, the Mirage Yachts-built Mirage 29.

== Design ==
The Mirage 29 is a small recreational keelboat, built predominantly of fiberglass, with wood trim. It has a masthead sloop rig, an external convetually stern mounted, streight dagger rudder on pintals and fixed twin keel. It displaces 8,267 lb (3,750 kg).

The boat has a draft of 3.75 ft (1.14 m) with the standard keel.

The boat is fitted with a Volvo Penta diesel engine of 18 hp (13 kW). The fuel tank holds 25 U.S. gallons (95 L; 21 imp gal) and the fresh water tank has a capacity of 30 U.S. gallons (110 L; 25 imp gal).

The design has a PHRF racing average handicap of 177 with a high of 183 and low of 174. It has a hull speed of 6.73 kn (12.46 km/h).
