= Terrapin 24 =

1970s American recreational keelboat

Development
- Designer: Dave Westphal
- Location: United States
- Year: 1973
- No. built: 60
- Builder: Friendship Manufacturing Company
- Role: Cruiser

Boat
- Displacement: 2,050 lb (930 kg)
- Draft: 5.00 ft (1.52 m) with keel down

Hull
- Type: monohull
- Construction: fiberglass
- LOA: 24.50 ft (7.47 m)
- LWL: 20.08 ft (6.12 m)
- Beam: 8.00 ft (2.44 m)
- Engine: outboard motor

Hull appendages
- Keel: swing keel
- Ballast: 100 lb (45 kg)
- Rudder: transom-mounted rudder

Rig
- Rig type: Bermuda rig

Sails
- Sailplan: fractional rigged sloop
- Total sail area: 216.00 sq ft (20.067 m^{2})

The Terrapin 24 is a fractional sloop rigged recreational keellboat built in the United States from 1973 to 1980, with 60 boats completed.

The fiberglass hull has an angled transom, a transom-hung rudder controlled by a tiller and a steel lifting keel. It displaces 2,050 lb (930 kg) and carries 100 lb (45 kg) of ballast. It has a draft of 5.00 ft (1.52 m) with the keel extended and 9 in (23 cm) with it retracted. The design has a hull speed of 6.0 kn (11.1 km/h).

It has five berths. The galley is on the starboard side just aft of the bow cabin and is equipped with a two-burner stove and a sink. The enclosed head is located to the port side of the companionway ladder. The companionway uses two sliding hatches for additional light and ventilation. Cabin headroom is 60 in (152 cm).

== Reception ==
In a 2010 review Steve Henkel wrote, "the Florida designer of this ultra-shallow-draft boat had two things in mind: (1) easy trailering and launching from ramps, or even from beaches or low bulkheads, without immersing the trailer (says the sales literature, though how this can be accomplished, even using a fully-rollered trailer, with a boat weighing more than a ton, is not mentioned) and (2) cruising in relatively good comfort for this size vessel. To this end, the rig is on the short side (28' 6" bridge clearance, mast stepped on deck, for easy raising and striking), the draft is a mere nine inches, and the towing weight is only 3,000 pounds. Best features: ... The galley area, which runs along the starboard side amidships, is as spacious as one would want. Worst features: The boat apparently has no ballast other than the steel centerboard, which we assume weighs something like a hundred pounds. The flat bottom is likely to pound in a chop. The short, low-slung rig will be slower than average in light air."
