= Nimble 25 Arctic =

Sailboat class

Development
- Designer: Ted Brewer
- Location: United States
- Year: 1988
- Builder: Nimble Boats
- Role: Cruiser

Boat
- Displacement: 2,900 lb (1,315 kg)
- Draft: 4.17 ft (1.27 m) with centerboard down

Hull
- Type: monohull
- Construction: fiberglass
- LOA: 26.00 ft (7.92 m)
- LWL: 24.17 ft (7.37 m)
- Beam: 8.25 ft (2.51 m)
- Engine: outboard motor

Hull appendages
- Keel: stub keel with centerboard
- Ballast: 1,000 lb (454 kg)
- Rudder: transom-mounted rudder

Rig
- Rig type: Bermuda rig

Sails
- Sailplan: fractional rigged sloop
- Total sail area: 240.00 sq ft (22.297 m^{2})

Racing
- PHRF: 249

The Nimble 25 Arctic, also called just the Nimble 25, is an American trailerable sailboat that was designed by Ted Brewer as a cruiser and first built in 1988.

== Production ==
The design was built by Nimble Boats in the United States from 1988 until 1993, but it is now out of production.

== Design ==
The Nimble 25 Arctic is a recreational keelboat, built predominantly of fiberglass, with wood trim. It has a fractional sloop rig or optional yawl rig, a canoe hull, a plumb stem, an angled transom, a transom-hung rudder controlled by a tiller or a wheel and a fixed stub keel with a retractable centerboard or an optional fixed keel. It displaces 2,900 lb (1,315 kg) and carries 1,000 lb (454 kg) of ballast.

The keel-equipped version of the boat has a draft of 2.5 ft (0.76 m), while the centerboard-equipped version has a draft of 4.17 ft (1.27 m) with the centerboard extended and 1.33 ft (0.41 m) with it retracted, allowing operation in shallow water or ground transportation on a trailer.

The design was produced in a number of different versions, including a "tropical" model with opening bronze ports and a solar vent, an "offshore" model with 200 lb (91 kg) additional ballast in a lead shoe and a "pilothouse" model with a pilothouse and wheel steering that provided greater headroom below decks.

The pilothouse model was later developed into the Arctic 25 and the Kodiak 26.

The boat is normally fitted with a small well-mounted 4 to 6 hp (3 to 4 kW) outboard motor for docking and maneuvering.

The design has sleeping accommodation for four people, with a double "V"-berth in the bow cabin and two straight settees in the main cabin. The galley is located on the port side amidships. The galley is equipped with a sink. The head is located just aft of the bow cabin on the port side. Cabin headroom is 54 in (137 cm).

The design has a PHRF racing average handicap of 249 and a hull speed of 6.5 kn (12.0 km/h).

== Operational history ==
In a 2010 review Steve Henkel wrote, "Ted Brewer has done a good job of creating a traditional-looking but trailerable character boat that has some good things going for it. One thing we especially liked is the optional mizzen mast with a 31-square foot sprit-rigged balancing sail. Mast and all can be pulled out like a weed and stored on deck when not in use—or the sail can just be furled in place by wrapping around its tiny mast. The yawl in the sailplan, also available as a sloop, was available either as a centerboarder (dimensions above) or as a shoal keeler with a 2' 6" draft ... Best features: The pilothouse has two steering stations, one in the cockpit with a tiller, and the other below with a wheel. She steers well even with the rudder in the 'folded' position. She is well finished, with plenty of bronze hardware. Worst features: Her bottom is nearly flat and has hard bilges, so she tends to pound moderately in a chop."

In a 1990 owner-review in Cruising World, Ginny Walters described the boat as having, "traditional lines, up-to-date comforts, pilothouse weather protection, easy towing, easy launching, slid and seaworthy."

== See also ==
- List of sailing boat types
