= Trinidad 48 =

Sailboat class

Development
- Designer: Guy Ribadeau Dumas
- Location: France
- Year: 1981
- Builder: Jeanneau
- Role: Cruiser
- Name: Trinidad 48

Boat
- Displacement: 27,552 lb (12,497 kg)
- Draft: 8.70 ft (2.65 m) with centerboard down

Hull
- Type: monohull
- Construction: fiberglass
- LOA: 47.57 ft (14.50 m)
- LWL: 41.33 ft (12.60 m)
- Beam: 15.09 ft (4.60 m)
- Engine: inboard diesel engine

Hull appendages
- Keel: fin keel with centerboard
- Ballast: 9,920 lb (4,500 kg)
- Rudder: skeg-mounted rudder

Rig
- Rig type: Bermuda rig
- I foretriangle height: 59.06 ft (18.00 m)
- J foretriangle base: 17.49 ft (5.33 m)
- P mainsail luff: 52.50 ft (16.00 m)
- E mainsail foot: 19.36 ft (5.90 m)

Sails
- Sailplan: masthead sloop
- Mainsail area: 508.20 sq ft (47.213 m^{2})
- Jib/genoa area: 516.48 sq ft (47.983 m^{2})
- Total sail area: 1,024.68 sq ft (95.196 m^{2})

The Trinidad 48 is a French sailboat that was designed by Guy Ribadeau Dumas as cruiser and first built in 1981.

== Production ==
The design was built by Jeanneau in France, from 1981 until 1987, but it is now out of production.

== Design ==
The Trinidad 48 is a recreational keelboat, built predominantly of fiberglass, with wood trim. It has a masthead sloop rig or optional ketch rig. The sloop version has a mast with two sets of spreaders and aluminum spars with stainless steel wire rigging. The hull has a raked stem, a reverse transom, a skeg-mounted rudder controlled by a wheel and a fixed fin keel or keel and retractable centerboard. It displaces 27,552 lb (12,497 kg) and carries 9,920 lb (4,500 kg) of lead ballast.

The keel-equipped version of the boat has a draft of 7.25 ft (2.21 m), while the centerboard-equipped version has a draft of 8.70 ft (2.65 m) with the centerboard extended and 4.50 ft (1.37 m) with it retracted, allowing operation in shallow water.

The boat is fitted with an inboard diesel engine for docking and maneuvering. The fuel tank holds 132 U.S. gallons (500 L; 110 imp gal) and the fresh water tank has a capacity of 251 U.S. gallons (950 L; 209 imp gal).

The design had several interior layouts ranging from two to five cabin. Typical is sleeping accommodation for six people, with a double berth in the bow cabin, a C-shaped settee portside in the main cabin and two aft cabins, each with a double berth. The galley is located on the starboard side, amidships. The galley is U-shaped and is equipped with a two-burner stove and a double sink. A navigation station is aft of the galley, also on the starboard side. There are three heads, one just aft of the bow cabin on the port side and one for each aft cabin.

For sailing downwind the design may be equipped with a symmetrical spinnaker.

The design has a hull speed of 8.62 kn (15.96 km/h).

== Operational history ==
A 2008 review in Sailing magazine noted, "the Jeanneau Trinidad 48 should have been more successful in North America when it was introduced in the early 1980s, and it should be better known as a used boat today. Why? Because it's a solid bluewater cruiser with a sensible hull shape, a commodious interior and a friendly deck saloon-style pilothouse. But it never caught on."

== See also ==
- List of sailing boat types
