= Signet 20 =

1960s recreational keelboat

Development
- Designer: Ray Kaufmann
- Location: United Kingdom
- Year: 1960
- Builders: Hurley Marine; Gilmax Limited; Signet Marine
- Role: Day sailer-cruiser
- Name: Signet 20

Boat
- Displacement: 2,146 lb (973 kg)
- Draft: 3.00 ft (0.91 m)

Hull
- Type: monohull
- Construction: glassfibre
- LOA: 19.83 ft (6.04 m)
- LWL: 16.00 ft (4.88 m)
- Beam: 6.67 ft (2.03 m)
- Engine: inboard engine or outboard motor

Hull appendages
- Keel: fin keel
- Ballast: 800 lb (363 kg)
- Rudder: skeg-mounted rudder

Rig
- Rig type: Bermuda rig
- I foretriangle height: 23.50 ft (7.16 m)
- J foretriangle base: 6.67 ft (2.03 m)
- P mainsail luff: 20.50 ft (6.25 m)
- E mainsail foot: 8.80 ft (2.68 m)

Sails
- Sailplan: masthead sloop
- Mainsail area: 90.20 sq ft (8.380 m^{2})
- Jib/genoa area: 78.37 sq ft (7.281 m^{2})
- Total sail area: 168.57 sq ft (15.661 m^{2})

The Signet 20 is a recreational keelboat built in the United Kingdom and in the United States, starting in 1960. It is now out of production.

The Signet 20 is built predominantly of glassfibre, with wood trim. It has a masthead sloop rig; a spooned, raked stem and an angled transom. It displaces 2,146 lb (973 kg) and carries 800 lb (363 kg) of iron ballast.

The design was produced with a number of keel and rudder configurations, including a single fin keel, twin bilge keels, skeg-mounted rudders or transom-mounted rudders, all controlled by a tiller. With the fin keel the boat has a draft of 3.00 ft (0.91 m), while the twin bilge keels give a draft of 2.00 ft (0.61 m).

The boat is normally fitted with a small 4 to 10 hp (3 to 7 kW) outboard motor or an inboard engine for docking and maneuvering.

The design has sleeping accommodation for four people, with a double "V"-berth in the bow cabin and two straight quarter berths aft. The galley is located on both sides just forward of the companionway ladder. The galley is equipped with a stove to starboard sink to port. The head is located in the bow cabin under the "V"-berth and is separated from the main cabin by a curtain. Cabin headroom is 48 in (122 cm).

The design has a hull speed of 5.4 kn (10.0 km/h).

The boat is supported by an active class club that organizes racing events, the Hurley Owners Association.
