= Wasa 30 =

Swedish sailboat from Wasa Yachts AB, 1979

Development
- Designer: Leif Ängemark
- Year: 1992
- Builder: Wasa Marin
- Name: Wasa 30

Boat
- Draft: 1.65 m (5.4 ft)

Hull
- LOA: 11 m (36 ft)
- LWL: 9 m (30 ft)
- Beam: 2.20 m (7.2 ft)

Wasa 30 is a Swedish sailboat from Wasa Yachts AB, that was introduced in 1979. It measures LOA 11.00m, beam 2.20 m, draft 1.80 m, displacement 2 400 kg and sailarea 30.0 m^{2}.

== Hull ==
In length, height and width the above-waterline design resembles the classical Skerry Cruiser design. The '30' in the model name also refers to the Skerry Cruiser sail area rules. Although the hull is quite different from the Skerry Cruisers below the water line, which is quite flat with a deep fin keel.

== Rig ==
The Wasa 30 is fractional rigged. There are two versions, high rig (HR) and low rig (LR), differing in sailarea and thus sailing performance.
