= Wylie Wabbit 24 =

1980s American recreational keelboat

Development
- Designer: Thomas Wylie
- Location: United States
- Year: 1982
- No. built: 63
- Builder: North Coast Yachts
- Name: Wylie Wabbit 24

Boat
- Displacement: 875 lb (397 kg)
- Draft: 3.50 ft (1.07 m)

Hull
- Type: monohull
- Construction: fiberglass
- LOA: 23.75 ft (7.24 m)
- LWL: 20.00 ft (6.10 m)
- Beam: 5.58 ft (1.70 m)
- Engine: outboard motor

Hull appendages
- Keel: fin keel
- Ballast: 440 lb (200 kg)
- Rudder: spade-type rudder

Rig
- Rig type: Bermuda rig
- I foretriangle height: 20.50 ft (6.25 m)
- J foretriangle base: 6.50 ft (1.98 m)
- P mainsail luff: 23.80 ft (7.25 m)
- E mainsail foot: 10.00 ft (3.05 m)

Sails
- Sailplan: fractional rigged sloop
- Mainsail area: 119.00 sq ft (11.055 m^{2})
- Jib/genoa area: 66.63 sq ft (6.190 m^{2})
- Total sail area: 185.63 sq ft (17.246 m^{2})

Racing
- PHRF: 150

The Wylie Wabbit 24 is a recreational keelboat first built in 1982. A total of 63 boats were completed in the United States before it went out of production.

== Design ==
Designed by Thomas Wylie, the fiberglass hull is constructed with iso resin, E-glass, with a foam core on the hull bottom. a raked stem, a reverse transom, an internally mounted spade-type rudder controlled by a tiller and a fixed fin keel. It displaces 875 lb (397 kg) and carries 440 lb (200 kg) of ballast.

The boat has a draft of 3.50 ft (1.07 m) with the standard keel.

The design has sleeping accommodation for two people, with a double "V"-berth in the bow cabin. Cabin headroom is 32 in (81 cm).

It has a fractional sloop rig. For sailing downwind the design may be equipped with a symmetrical spinnaker and a trapeze is also used for racing.

The design has a PHRF racing average handicap of 150 and a hull speed of 6.0 kn (11.1 km/h).
