= Merit 22 =

Sailboat class

Development
- Designer: Paul Yates
- Location: United States
- Year: 1981
- No. built: 600
- Builder: Merit Marine
- Role: Racer-Cruiser
- Name: Merit 22

Boat
- Displacement: 2,000 lb (907 kg)
- Draft: 4.00 ft (1.22 m) with the keel down

Hull
- Type: monohull
- Construction: fiberglass
- LOA: 22.00 ft (6.71 m)
- LWL: 18.00 ft (5.49 m)
- Beam: 8.00 ft (2.44 m)
- Engine: outboard motor

Hull appendages
- Keel: lifting keel
- Ballast: 600 lb (272 kg)
- Rudder: transom-mounted rudder

Rig
- Rig type: Bermuda rig
- I foretriangle height: 28.00 ft (8.53 m)
- J foretriangle base: 8.25 ft (2.51 m)
- P mainsail luff: 23.00 ft (7.01 m)
- E mainsail foot: 9.60 ft (2.93 m)

Sails
- Sailplan: masthead sloop
- Mainsail area: 110.40 sq ft (10.256 m^{2})
- Jib/genoa area: 115.50 sq ft (10.730 m^{2})
- Total sail area: 225.90 sq ft (20.987 m^{2})

Racing
- PHRF: 219

The Merit 22 is a sailboat first built in 1981.

The Merit 22 is a development of the larger Merit 25 by the same designer.

== Production ==
The design was built in the United States by Merit Marine, a company founded by the designer. The boat was built from 1981 until 1986, with 600 completed, but it is now out of production.

== Design ==
The Merit 22 is a recreational keelboat, built predominantly of fiberglass. It has a masthead sloop rig, a raked stem, a plumb transom, a transom-hung rudder controlled by a tiller and a locking lifting keel. It displaces 2,000 lb (907 kg) and carries 600 lb (272 kg) of lead ballast. It has foam for positive flotation.

The boat has a draft of 4.00 ft (1.22 m) with the keel extended and 2.00 ft (0.61 m) with it retracted, allowing operation in shallow water or ground transportation on a trailer.

The boat is normally fitted with a small 3 to 6 hp (2 to 4 kW) outboard motor for docking and maneuvering.

The design has sleeping accommodation for five people, with a double "V"-berth in the bow cabin, a drop-down dinette table on the port side of the main cabin, that converts to a double berth, plus a quarter berth on the starboard side. The galley is located on the starboard side just forward of the companionway ladder. The galley is equipped with a two-burner stove and a sink, while an icebox doubles as the companionway step. The head is located in the bow cabin on the starboard side under the "V"-berth. Cabin headroom is 45 in (114 cm) with the cabin pop-top closed and 72 in (183 cm) with it open.

The design has a PHRF racing average handicap of 219 and a hull speed of 5.7 kn (10.6 km/h).

== Reception ==
In a 2010 review Steve Henkel wrote, "the Merit 22 (launched 1982), a racer-cruiser, followed the successful look-alike Merit 25 (launched 1979) which won the MORC national championships twice. Best features: She looks sleek, and although she suffers in the headroom department a little with the hatch closed, with her poptop erected, she is said to have six-foot headroom. Her vertically lifting keel is lead, not the usual iron, which improves her stability because of the greater density of lead, and avoids the maintenance chores associated with the rust that inevitably goes with iron or steel. The keel is out of the way in the up position and locks in the down position so it doesn't slide up in the event of a capsize. She has enough foam flotation to keep her from sinking, Worst features: Try as we might, we came up with only minor negatives. For example, her interior is very plain—designed for racing lightness rather than opulent luxury. Someone complained that her perforated aluminum rail (handy for attaching snatch blocks and fenders) was sharp enough on its top edge to chafe any docking lines that might pass over it. And one sailor suggested bigger mooring chocks and cleats than came standard."
