= Sun Odyssey 45.1 =

Sailboat class

Development
- Designer: Philippe Briand; Jeanneau Design Office
- Location: France
- Year: 1995
- Builder: Jeanneau
- Role: Cruiser

Boat
- Displacement: 21,253 lb (9,640 kg)
- Draft: 5.25 ft (1.60 m)

Hull
- Type: monohull
- Construction: fiberglass
- LOA: 46.42 ft (14.15 m)
- LWL: 38.42 ft (11.71 m)
- Beam: 14.70 ft (4.48 m)
- Engine: Yanmar 4JH2TE 60 hp (45 kW) diesel engine

Hull appendages
- Keel: fin keel
- Ballast: 8,102 lb (3,675 kg)
- Rudder: spade-type rudder

Rig
- Rig type: Bermuda rig
- I foretriangle height: 51.18 ft (15.60 m)
- J foretriangle base: 16.08 ft (4.90 m)
- P mainsail luff: 46.06 ft (14.04 m)
- E mainsail foot: 16.40 ft (5.00 m)

Sails
- Sailplan: masthead sloop
- Mainsail area: 377.69 sq ft (35.089 m^{2})
- Jib/genoa area: 411.49 sq ft (38.229 m^{2})
- Total sail area: 789.18 sq ft (73.317 m^{2})

Racing
- PHRF: 75-78

The Sun Odyssey 45.1 is a French sailboat that was designed by Philippe Briand and the Jeanneau Design Office as a cruiser and yacht charter boat, first built in 1995.

The design was developed into the Sun Odyssey 45.2 in 1997, which replaced it in production.

== Production ==
The design was built by Jeanneau in France, from 1995 until 1997, but it is now out of production.

== Design ==
The Sun Odyssey 45.1 is a recreational keelboat, built predominantly of polyester fiberglass, with Burmese teak wood trim. The hull is solid fiberglass with Kevlar reinforcement, while the deck is fiberglass with a balsa core. It has a masthead sloop rig with a deck-stepped mast, aluminum spars by Sparcraft and stainless steel wire rigging. The hull has a raked stem, a walk-through reverse transom with a swimming platform, an internally mounted spade-type rudder controlled by dual wheels and a fixed deep draft fin keel or optional shoal-draft keel. The deep draft fin keel model displaces 20,570 lb (9,330 kg) and carries 7,110 lb (3,225 kg) of cast iron ballast, while the shoal draft version displaces 21,253 lb (9,640 kg) and carries 8,102 lb (3,675 kg) of cast iron ballast.

The boat has a draft of 6.58 ft (2.01 m) with the deep draft keel and 5.25 ft (1.60 m) with the optional shoal draft keel.

The boat is fitted with a Japanese Yanmar 4JH2TE diesel engine of 60 hp (45 kW) for docking and maneuvering. An 88 hp (66 kW) engine was optional. The fuel tank holds 54 U.S. gallons (200 L; 45 imp gal) and the fresh water tank has a capacity of 159 U.S. gallons (600 L; 132 imp gal).

The design has sleeping accommodation for six to eight people, with a double berth in the bow "owner's"" cabin, a U-shaped settee in the main cabin and two aft cabins, each with a double berth. The bow cabin may be divided in two and each equipped with a double "V"-berth. The straight configuration galley is located on the port side just forward of the companionway ladder. A navigation station is opposite the galley, on the starboard side. There are two heads, one just aft of the bow cabin on the starboard side and one on the port side, aft. Cabin headroom is 77 in (196 cm).

For sailing downwind the design may be equipped with a symmetrical spinnaker.

The design has a PHRF handicap of 75 to 78.

== Operational history ==
In a 2001 review for Cruising World, Quentin Warren wrote, "under sail, the boat is solid, quick and responsive. We had the opportunity to go for a ride off southeast Florida last March following the passage of a cold front that left in its wake some gusty northerlies and lumpy seas. Ballast and sail area are nicely balanced, and control from the helm is excellent. The 45.1 is wide enough to make having port and starboard steering stations a sensible feature, giving you terrific visibility from well outboard on the high side or the low. The hull is weatherly and the ride steady through chop, which allows you to put the boat in the groove and click off the miles handily upwind or on a reach."

== See also ==
- List of sailing boat types
