= Sun Odyssey 44i =

Sailboat class

Development
- Designer: Philippe Briand
- Location: France
- Year: 2009
- Builder: Jeanneau
- Role: Cruiser
- Name: Sun Odyssey 44i

Boat
- Displacement: 21,892 lb (9,930 kg)
- Draft: 6.73 ft (2.05 m)

Hull
- Type: monohull
- Construction: fiberglass
- LOA: 24.11 ft (7.35 m)
- LWL: 37.57 ft (11.45 m)
- Beam: 14.34 ft (4.37 m)
- Engine: Yanmar 4JH4E 54 hp (40 kW) diesel engine

Hull appendages
- Keel: fin keel
- Ballast: 6,512 lb (2,954 kg)
- Rudder: spade-type rudder

Rig
- Rig type: Bermuda rig
- I foretriangle height: 54.26 ft (16.54 m)
- J foretriangle base: 15.26 ft (4.65 m)
- P mainsail luff: 50.10 ft (15.27 m)
- E mainsail foot: 17.39 ft (5.30 m)

Sails
- Sailplan: fractional rigged sloop
- Mainsail area: 435.62 sq ft (40.470 m^{2})
- Jib/genoa area: 414.00 sq ft (38.462 m^{2})
- Total sail area: 849.62 sq ft (78.932 m^{2})

Racing
- PHRF: 81-105

The Sun Odyssey 44i is a French sailboat that was designed by Philippe Briand as a cruiser and first built in 2009.

The "i" in the designation indicates that the deck is injection-molded.

== Production ==
The design was built by Jeanneau in France, starting in 2009, but it is now out of production.

== Design ==
The Sun Odyssey 44i is a recreational keelboat, built predominantly of fiberglass, with wood trim. It has a fractional sloop rig, a raked stem, a reverse transom with a swimming platform, an internally mounted spade-type rudder controlled by dual wheels and a fixed fin keel or optional deep-draft keel. The fin keel model displaces 21,892 lb (9,930 kg) and carries 6,512 lb (2,954 kg) of ballast, while the deep draft version displaces 21,892 lb (9,930 kg) and carries 6,316 lb (2,865 kg) of ballast.

The boat has a draft of 6.73 ft (2.05 m) with the standard keel and 7.54 ft (2.30 m) with the optional deep draft keel.

A "performance" version uses the deep draft keel and a mast that is about 3.8 ft (1.2 m) taller, with a sail area increased by 4%.

The boat is fitted with a Japanese Yanmar 4JH4E diesel engine of 54 hp (40 kW) for docking and maneuvering. The fuel tank holds 63 U.S. gallons (240 L; 52 imp gal) and the fresh water tank has a capacity of 162 U.S. gallons (610 L; 135 imp gal).

The design was built with a number of different interior arrangements, providing sleeping accommodation for six to eight people. A typical three cabin interior has a double island berth in the bow cabin, a U-shaped settee in the main cabin and two aft cabins, each with a double berth. The four cabin layout splits the bow cabin into two smaller cabins, each with a double "V"-berth. The galley is located on the port side just forward of the companionway ladder, amidships. The galley is of a straight configuration and is equipped with a four-burner stove, an ice box and a double sink. A navigation station is opposite the galley, on the starboard side. There are normally two heads fitted, one in the bow cabin on the starboard side and one on the port side, aft. A third head may be fitted aft, starboard.

The design has a hull speed of 8.21 kn (15.20 km/h) and a PHRF handicap of 81 to 105.

== Operational history ==
In a 2010 review for Cruising World, Jeremy McGeary wrote, "overall, the Jeanneau Sun Odyssey 44i demonstrates that this is about the optimum size for a cruising sailboat: You can cut up the interior to accommodate up to six crew in relative luxury, the sailhandling isn’t daunting without power winches (although the test boat did have them), the hull has long enough legs to give it a good range within a day’s sail (and the 63 gallons of fuel, prudently burned, should deliver perhaps 400 miles), and the boat is big enough not to feel small in a blow."

== See also ==
- List of sailing boat types
