= Sun Odyssey 469 =

Sailboat class

Development
- Designer: Philippe Briand
- Location: France
- Year: 2013
- Builder: Jeanneau
- Role: Cruiser
- Name: Sun Odyssey 469

Boat
- Displacement: 23,830 lb (10,809 kg)
- Draft: 7.35 ft (2.24 m)

Hull
- Type: monohull
- Construction: fiberglass
- LOA: 46.10 ft (14.05 m)
- LWL: 41.14 ft (12.54 m)
- Beam: 14.73 ft (4.49 m)
- Engine: Yanmar 4JH5-CE 54 hp (40 kW) diesel engine

Hull appendages
- Keel: fin keel with weighted bulb
- Ballast: 6,823 lb (3,095 kg)
- Rudder: spade-type rudder

Rig
- Rig type: Bermuda rig
- I foretriangle height: 56.43 ft (17.20 m)
- J foretriangle base: 18.57 ft (5.66 m)
- P mainsail luff: 54.53 ft (16.62 m)
- E mainsail foot: 16.73 ft (5.10 m)

Sails
- Sailplan: fractional rigged sloop
- Mainsail area: 534 sq ft (49.6 m^{2})
- Jib/genoa area: 501 sq ft (46.5 m^{2})
- Other sails: Code 0: 908 sq ft (84.4 m^{2})
- Upwind sail area: 1,034 sq ft (96.1 m^{2})
- Downwind sail area: 1,442 sq ft (134.0 m^{2})

The Sun Odyssey 469 is a French sailboat that was designed by Philippe Briand as a cruiser and first built in 2013.

The Sun Odyssey 469 design was also sold as the Sunsail 47 for the yacht charter market.

== Production ==
The design was built by Jeanneau in France, starting in 2013, but it is now out of production.

== Design ==
The Sun Odyssey 469 is a recreational keelboat, built predominantly of fiberglass, with wood trim. The hull is made from solid, hand-laid fiberglass, with a glassed-in structural grid, while the deck is injection-molded. It has a fractional sloop rig, with a deck-stepped mast, two sets of swept spreaders and aluminum spars with 1X19 stainless steel wire rigging. The hull has a nearly-plumb stem, a reverse transom with a drop-down tailgate swimming platform, an internally mounted spade-type rudder controlled by dual wheels and a fixed L-shaped fin keel with a weighted bulb or optional shoal-draft keel. The fin keel model displaces 23,830 lb (10,809 kg) empty and carries 6,823 lb (3,095 kg) of cast iron ballast, while the shoal draft version displaces 24,604 lb (11,160 kg) empty and carries 7,584 lb (3,440 kg) of cast iron ballast.

The boat has a draft of 7.35 ft (2.24 m) with the standard keel and 5.41 ft (1.65 m) with the optional shoal draft keel.

The boat is fitted with a Japanese Yanmar 4JH5-CE diesel engine of 54 hp (40 kW) for docking and maneuvering. The fuel tank holds 63 U.S. gallons (240 L; 52 imp gal) and the fresh water tank has a capacity of 162 U.S. gallons (610 L; 135 imp gal).

The design was built in two different interior configurations, with sleeping accommodation for six or eight people. The "owners" version has a double island berth in the bow cabin, an U-shaped settee and a two single seats in the main cabin and twin aft cabins each with a double berth. The charter version divides the bow cabin in to two cabins, each with a double "V"-berth. The galley is located on the starboard side just forward of the companionway ladder. The galley is L-shaped and is equipped with a three-burner stove, a refrigerator, freezer and a double sink. There are two heads, one in the bow cabin on the port side and one on the port side, aft. A third head and forth head may be added, with the galley moved admidships and in a straight configuration. Cabin maximum headroom is 76 in (193 cm).

For sailing downwind the design may be equipped with a code 0 sail of 908 sq ft (84.4 m^{2}).

The design has a hull speed of 8.60 kn (15.93 km/h).

== Operational history ==
In a 2014 Sail Magazine review, Emme Hurley wrote, "a northeast breeze had been blowing in the mid- to high-teens for hours by the time we emerged from Miami's Government Cut on to the open Atlantic—perfect weather for a good boat test. Chatting earlier with Jeanneau America's Erik Stromberg, I’d wondered aloud how the boat would fare in these conditions under a full press of sail with its single rudder. Among other things, the boat carries a good deal of beam aft, and at 46ft 1in feet LOA, it’s big enough to benefit from having dual rudders when sailing on its ear. However, hardening up beyond Red No. 6, though, the boat dug in and powered into the swells on a close reach as if it were the most natural thing in the world, hitting 7.5-plus knots in the puffs: nice numbers given the in-mast furling main and the standard 106 percent headsail. The boat also held its way, easily tacking through the chop, and maintained a light, sensitive helm sailing at a 40-degree apparent wind angle. Overall motion in the lumpy seas was surprisingly easy and comfortable."

In a 2021 review for Yachting Monthly, Toby Hodges wrote, "the Code 0 option, as offered on modern Bénéteaus, certainly enhances Mediterranean sailing. The Jeanneau Sun Odyssey 469 is remarkably easy and pleasant to sail. Despite just five knots of wind, we still made 4.5 knots thanks to the Code 0 – pretty slick for a big cruising machine. And even in the zephyrs I enjoyed steering the boat, something that can't be said for many mass-production boats in light airs."

== See also ==
- List of sailing boat types
