= Sun Odyssey 49i =

Sailboat class

Development
- Designer: Philippe Briand
- Location: France
- Year: 2009
- Builder: Jeanneau
- Role: Cruiser
- Name: Sun Odyssey 49i

Boat
- Displacement: 27,778 lb (12,600 kg)
- Draft: 7.05 ft (2.15 m)

Hull
- Type: monohull
- Construction: fiberglass
- LOA: 49.44 ft (15.07 m)
- LWL: 42.58 ft (12.98 m)
- Beam: 14.73 ft (4.49 m)
- Engine: Yanmar 4JH4 TE 75 hp (56 kW) diesel engine

Hull appendages
- Keel: fin keel
- Ballast: 8,267 lb (3,750 kg)
- Rudder: spade-type rudder

Rig
- Rig type: Bermuda rig
- I foretriangle height: 55.77 ft (17.00 m)
- J foretriangle base: 18.63 ft (5.68 m)
- P mainsail luff: 51.67 ft (15.75 m)
- E mainsail foot: 18.39 ft (5.61 m)

Sails
- Sailplan: fractional rigged sloop
- Mainsail area: 474.59 sq ft (44.091 m^{2})
- Jib/genoa area: 519.50 sq ft (48.263 m^{2})
- Total sail area: 994.09 sq ft (92.354 m^{2})

The Sun Odyssey 49i is a French sailboat that was designed by Philippe Briand as a cruiser and first built in 2009.

The "i" in the designation indicates that the deck is injection-molded.

== Production ==
The design was built by Jeanneau in France, starting in 2009, but it is now out of production.

== Design ==
The Sun Odyssey 49i is a recreational keelboat, built predominantly of fiberglass, with wood trim. It has a fractional sloop rig, a slightly raked stem, a reverse transom with a swimming platform, an internally mounted spade-type rudder controlled by dual wheels and a fixed fin keel optional deep draft keel or shoal draft keel. The fin keel model displaces 27,778 lb (12,600 kg) and carries 8,267 lb (3,750 kg) of ballast, while the deep draft version carries 8,025 lb (3,640 kg) of ballast. A bow thruster is optional.

The boat has a draft of 7.05 ft (2.15 m) with the standard keel, 7.71 ft (2.35 m) with the optional deep draft keel and 5.58 ft (1.70 m) with the optional shoal draft keel.

A "performance" version employs the deep draft keel and a mast that is about 2.63 ft (0.80 m) taller, with about 32% greater sail area.

The boat is fitted with a Japanese Yanmar 4JH4 TE diesel engine of 75 hp (56 kW) for docking and maneuvering. The fuel tank holds 63 U.S. gallons (240 L; 52 imp gal) and the fresh water tank has a capacity of 160 U.S. gallons (610 L; 130 imp gal).

The design has three and four cabin layouts, providing sleeping accommodation for six to eight people. The three cabin version has a double island berth in the bow cabin, a U-shaped settee and a straight settee in the main cabin and two aft cabins, each with a double berth. The four cabin model divides the bow cabin into two smaller ones, each with a "V"-berth. The galley is located on the port side just forward of the companionway ladder, admidships. The galley is of straight configuration and is equipped with a four-burner stove, a refrigerator, freezer and a double sink. A navigation station is opposite the galley, on the starboard side. Two to four heads may be fitted, fore and aft, for each cabin.

The design has a hull speed of 8.74 kn (16.19 km/h).

== Operational history ==
In a 2009 review for Cruising World, Mark Pillsbury concluded, "all in all, the new Sun Odyssey 49i is a well-laid-out boat with enough volume and comfort to allow an owner to entertain in port while offering all the performance you need under sail to leave a cruising couple or family with smiles on their faces at the end of a journey or an afternoon on the water."

== See also ==
- List of sailing boat types
