= Sun Odyssey 49 DS =

Sailboat class

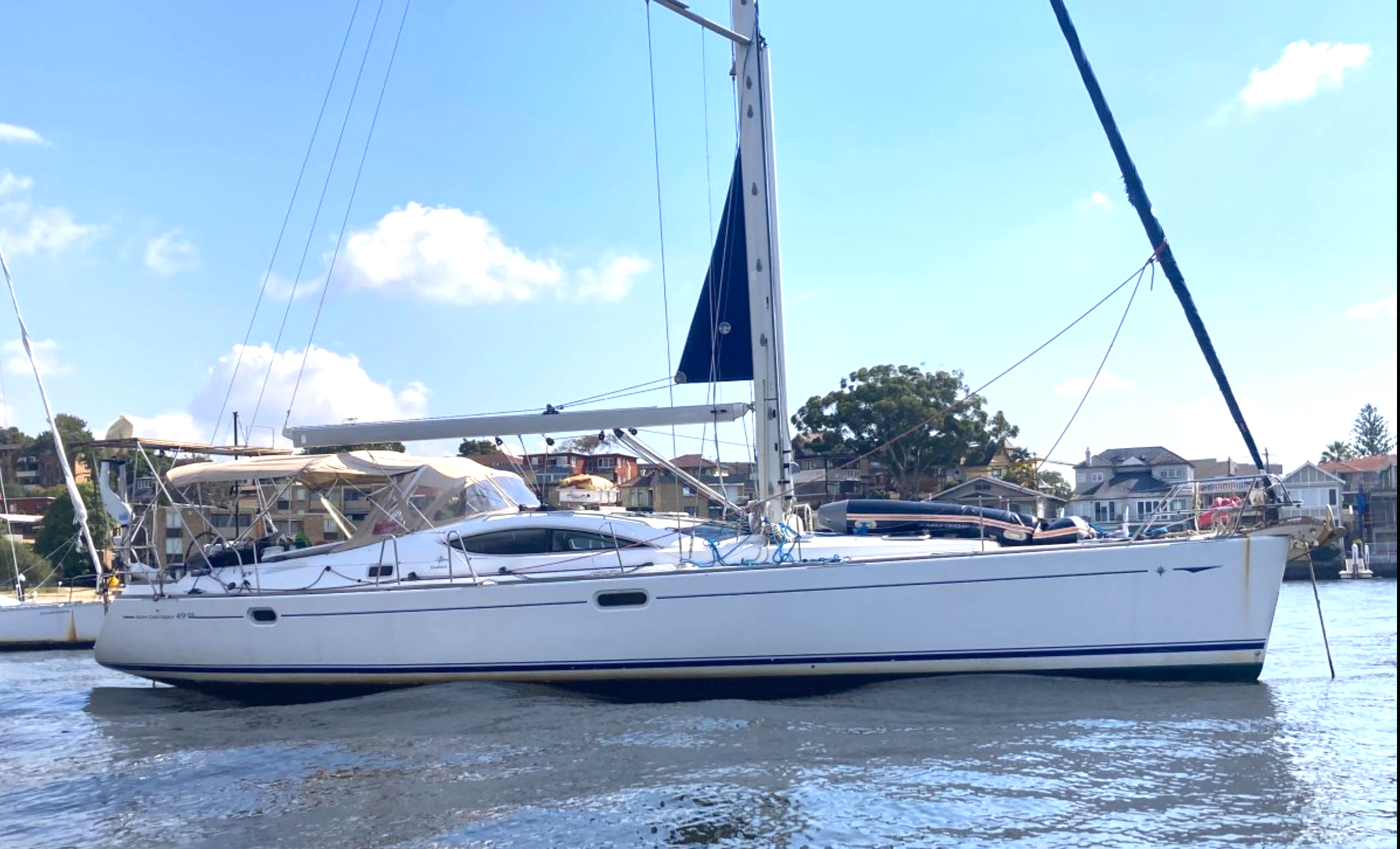

Development
- Designer: Philippe Briand; Vittorio Garroni
- Location: France
- Year: 2004
- Builder: Jeanneau
- Role: Cruiser
- Name: Sun Odyssey 49 DS

Boat
- Displacement: 28,000 lb (12,701 kg)
- Draft: 7.05 ft (2.15 m)

Hull
- Type: monohull
- Construction: fiberglass
- LOA: 49.15 ft (14.98 m)
- LWL: 42.32 ft (12.90 m)
- Beam: 16.37 ft (4.99 m)
- Engine: Yanmar 4JH3TE 75 hp (56 kW) diesel engine

Hull appendages
- Keel: fin keel
- Ballast: 9,039 lb (4,100 kg)
- Rudder: spade-type rudder

Rig
- Rig type: Bermuda rig
- I foretriangle height: 55.77 ft (17.00 m)
- J foretriangle base: 18.63 ft (5.68 m)
- P mainsail luff: 51.67 ft (15.75 m)
- E mainsail foot: 17.72 ft (5.40 m)

Sails
- Sailplan: masthead sloop
- Mainsail area: 457.80 sq ft (42.531 m^{2})
- Jib/genoa area: 519.50 sq ft (48.263 m^{2})
- Total sail area: 977.29 sq ft (90.793 m^{2})

The Sun Odyssey 49 DS (Deck Salon) is a French recreational sailing yacht that was built by Jeanneau as part of a family of Sun Odyssey yachts. A cruising keelboat, its hull was designed by Philippe Briand, with styling by Vittorio Garroni. Normally sloop-rigged, she has a hull speed of 8.72 kn (16.15 km/h). First built in 2004, the 49DS is no longer a current model.

== Design ==
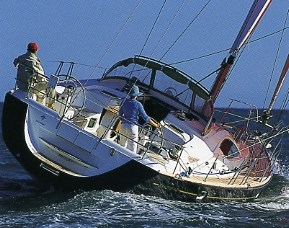
Sun Odyssey 49 DS stern view.jpg

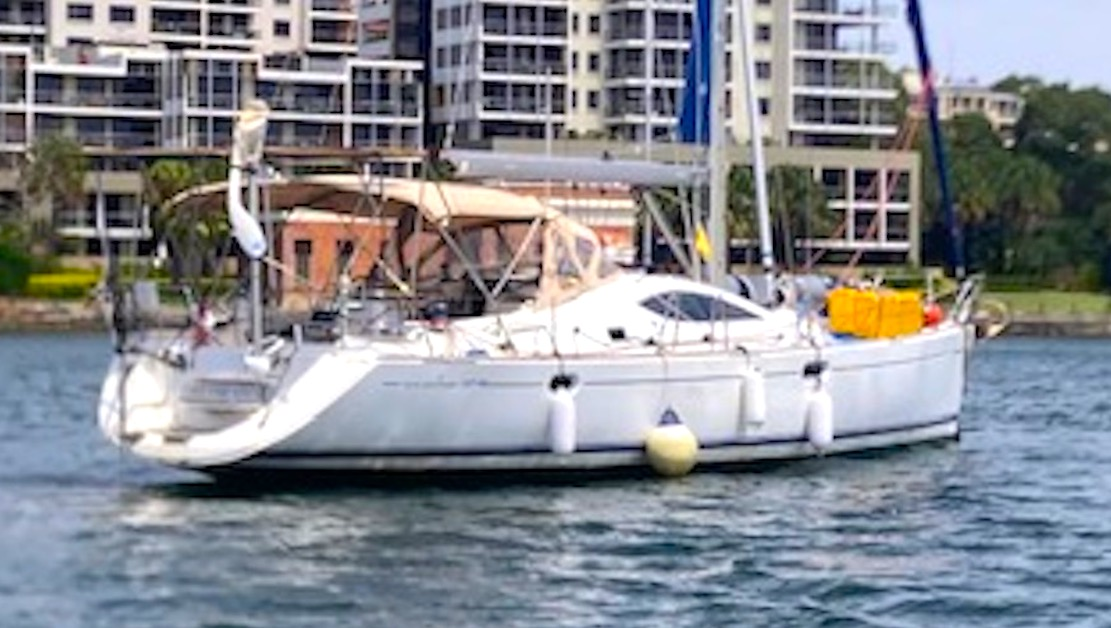
A Jeanneau 49DS in Sydney harbour

The Sun Odyssey 49DS's hull is built predominantly of fiberglass. A masthead sloop with a nearly-plumb stem, it features a reverse transom, a skeg-mounted spade-type rudder controlled by a wheel, and a fixed fin keel, with a weighted bulb. It displaces 28,000 lb (12,701 kg) and carries 9,039 lb (4,100 kg) of iron ballast.

The boat has a draft of 7.05 ft (2.15 m) with the standard keel and 5.41 ft (1.65 m) with the optional shoal draft keel. She is fitted with a Japanese Yanmar 4JH3TE diesel engine of 75 hp (56 kW) for docking and maneuvering. The fuel tank holds 63 U.S. gallons (240 L; 52 imp gal) and the fresh water tank has a capacity of 185 U.S. gallons (700 L; 154 imp gal).

The design has sleeping accommodation for six people, with two double berths in twin bow cabins and an aft cabin with a central double berth. The galley is located on the starboard side at the companionway ladder. The galley is L-shaped and is equipped with a two-burner stove and a double sink. A navigation station is opposite the galley, on the starboard side. There are three heads, one just aft of each of the bow cabins and one on the port side in the aft cabin.

== See also ==
- List of sailing boat types
