= Sun Odyssey 36i =

Sailboat class

Development
- Designer: Marc Lombard
- Location: France
- Year: 2007
- Builder: Jeanneau
- Role: Cruiser
- Name: Sun Odyssey 36i

Boat
- Displacement: 12,566 lb (5,700 kg)
- Draft: 6.36 ft (1.94 m)

Hull
- Type: monohull
- Construction: fiberglass
- LOA: 35.89 ft (10.94 m)
- LWL: 32.28 ft (9.84 m)
- Beam: 11.78 ft (3.59 m)
- Engine: Yanmar 3YM30 29 hp (22 kW) diesel engine

Hull appendages
- Keel: fin keel withe weighted bulb
- Ballast: 3,463 lb (1,571 kg)
- Rudder: spade-type rudder

Rig
- Rig type: Bermuda rig
- I foretriangle height: 45.11 ft (13.75 m)
- J foretriangle base: 13.19 ft (4.02 m)
- P mainsail luff: 43.24 ft (13.18 m)
- E mainsail foot: 12.70 ft (3.87 m)

Sails
- Sailplan: fractional rigged sloop
- Mainsail area: 274.57 sq ft (25.508 m^{2})
- Jib/genoa area: 297.50 sq ft (27.639 m^{2})
- Total sail area: 572.07 sq ft (53.147 m^{2})

Racing
- PHRF: 105-150

The Sun Odyssey 36i, also called the Sunsail 36i, is a French sailboat that was designed by Marc Lombard as a cruiser and first built in 2007.

The "i" in the designation indicates that the deck is injection-molded.

== Production ==
The design was built by Jeanneau in France, starting in 2007, but it is now out of production.

== Design ==
The Sun Odyssey 36i is a recreational keelboat, built predominantly of vinylester fiberglass, with a balsa-cored deck, hand-laid hull and wood trim. It has a fractional sloop rig, a slightly raked stem, a reverse transom with a swimming platform, an internally mounted spade-type rudder controlled by a wheel and a fixed fin keel with a weighted bulb or optional deep-draft keel. A furling mainsail was a factory option. The fin keel model displaces 12,566 lb (5,700 kg) and carries 3,463 lb (1,571 kg) of ballast, while the deep draft version displaces 12,566 lb (5,700 kg) and carries 3,408 lb (1,546 kg) of ballast.

A "performance" version has a slightly deeper draft keel and a mast that is about 1.2 ft (37 cm) taller, with 8% more sail area.

The boat has a draft of 6.36 ft (1.94 m) with the standard keel and 6.89 ft (2.10 m) with the optional deep draft keel.

The boat is fitted with a Japanese Yanmar 3YM30 29 hp (22 kW) diesel engine for docking and maneuvering. The fuel tank holds 34 U.S. gallons (130 L; 28 imp gal) and the fresh water tank has a capacity of 94 U.S. gallons (360 L; 78 imp gal).

The design was built with two and three cabin interior layouts. The two cabin version has sleeping accommodation for four people, with a double "V"-berth in the bow cabin, a U-shaped settee and a straight settee in the main cabin and an aft cabin with a double berth on the starboard side. The three cabin version adds a second aft cabin with a double berth on the port side, in place of storage space. The galley is located on the starboard side just forward of the companionway ladder. The galley is L-shaped and is equipped with a two-burner stove, an ice box and a double sink. A navigation station is opposite the galley, on the port side. The head is located aft, at the companionway on the port side and includes a shower. On the three cabin model the hed is reduced in size.

For sailing downwind the design may be equipped with a symmetrical spinnaker.

The design has a hull speed of 7.61 kn (14.09 km/h) and a PHRF handicap of 105 to 150.

== Operational history ==
In a 2008 review for Cruising World, Herb McCormick wrote, "our 36i was rigged with a traditional mainsail (a furling main is an option), and in the fresh conditions we tucked the first reef in and unfurled about three-quarters of the slightly overlapping jib. Upwind, the boat trucked along without bother, and once we cracked off, it really kicked up its heels. Unfortunately, our GPS had fizzled out, so we were incapable of recording boat speeds, but our overall impression was that Lombard has produced a top performer. The most impressive part of the trial was the bite on the rudder. We never once came close to spinning out, which isn’t always the case when high-volume hulls are coupled with high-aspect blade rudders."

In a review for Yacht and Boat, Barry Tranter concluded, "good looking and well priced, Jeanneau's 36i touches a lot of bases, but does so in a hull of modest size which is easy to sail and easy to moor and dock. There's an old waterfront adage that says your dreamboat is one size up from the one you own now. These latest, beamy hulls have so much volume that they prove the reverse of that theory: the best choice may be one size down from the boat you think you want."

== See also ==
- List of sailing boat types
