= Sun Odyssey 50 DS =

Sailboat class

Development
- Designer: Philippe Briand
- Location: France
- Year: 2008
- Builder: Jeanneau
- Role: Cruiser
- Name: Sun Odyssey 50 DS

Boat
- Displacement: 29,542 lb (13,400 kg)
- Draft: 7.05 ft (2.15 m)

Hull
- Type: monohull
- Construction: fiberglass
- LOA: 49.44 ft (15.07 m)
- LWL: 43.04 ft (13.12 m)
- Beam: 14.73 ft (4.49 m)
- Engine: Yanmar 4JH4 TE 75 hp (56 kW) diesel engine

Hull appendages
- Keel: fin keel with weighted bulb
- Ballast: 8,267 lb (3,750 kg)
- Rudder: spade-type rudder

Rig
- Rig type: Bermuda rig
- I foretriangle height: 55.77 ft (17.00 m)
- J foretriangle base: 18.63 ft (5.68 m)
- P mainsail luff: 51.67 ft (15.75 m)
- E mainsail foot: 18.37 ft (5.60 m)

Sails
- Sailplan: fractional rigged sloop
- Mainsail area: 474.59 sq ft (44.091 m^{2})
- Jib/genoa area: 519.50 sq ft (48.263 m^{2})
- Total sail area: 994.09 sq ft (92.354 m^{2})

Racing
- PHRF: 69

The Sun Odyssey 50 DS (Deck Salon), is a French sailboat that was designed by Philippe Briand as a cruiser and first built in 2008.

== Production ==
The design was built by Jeanneau in France, from 2008 until 2016, but it is now out of production.

== Design ==
The Sun Odyssey 50 DS is a recreational keelboat, built predominantly of fiberglass, with wood trim. It has a fractional sloop rig, a raked stem, a reverse transom with steps to a swimming platform, an internally mounted spade-type rudder controlled by dual wheels and a fixed L-shaped fin keel with a weighted bulb or optional shoal-draft keel. The fin keel model displaces 29,542 lb (13,400 kg) and carries 8,267 lb (3,750 kg) of cast iron ballast, while the centerboard version carries 9,038 lb (4,100 kg) of ballast. A bow thruster was a factory option.

The boat has a draft of 7.05 ft (2.15 m) with the standard keel and 5.54 ft (1.69 m) with the optional shoal draft keel.

The boat is fitted with a Japanese Yanmar 4JH4 TE diesel engine of 75 hp (56 kW) for docking and maneuvering. The fuel tank holds 63 U.S. gallons (240 L; 52 imp gal) and the fresh water tank has a capacity of 163 U.S. gallons (620 L; 136 imp gal).

The design has built with several different interior arrangements, providing sleeping accommodation for six to eight people. Configurations include either two bow cabins, each with a double "V"-berth, or a single larger cabin with an island berth. Two cabins may be fitted aft, each with a double berth or one cabin with an island berth. The four cabin arrangement is intended for the yacht charter business. The main salon has a U-shaped settee and a straight settee. The galley is located on the starboard side at the companionway ladder. The galley is L-shaped and is equipped with a four-burner stove, an ice box and a double sink. A navigation station is opposite the galley, on the port side. Two or three heads may be fitted, one or two aft of the bow cabins and one on the port side, aft.

The design has a hull speed of 8.79 kn (16.28 km/h) and a PHRF handicap of 69.

== Operational history ==
In a 2008 review for Cruising World, Jeremy McGeary wrote, "when one steps aboard the Sun Odyssey 50 DS, an initial observation is the surprisingly clear view forward, even when one is seated behind the wheel (of which, in conformation to current trends, there are two). The designers have achieved this by keeping the profile of the deckhouse over the raised saloon relatively low and by elevating the cockpit a little, moves which have also enhanced the roominess belowdecks."

In a 2009 Sail Magazine review, Tom Dove wrote, "Jeanneau's careful refinements of the Deck Saloon layout have caught on with its customers. Although the company has built DS models as small as 39 feet, the design approach really comes into its own when the yacht is 50 feet or larger. Then the raised sole amidships opens up the primary living spaces while providing usable stowage beneath, even when the hull form is relatively shallow, as this one is."

== See also ==
- List of sailing boat types
