= Sun Odyssey 33i =

Sailboat class

Development
- Designer: Marc Lombard
- Location: France
- Year: 2008
- Builder: Jeanneau
- Role: Cruiser
- Name: Sun Odyssey 33i

Boat
- Displacement: 10,240 lb (4,645 kg)
- Draft: 6.23 ft (1.90 m)

Hull
- Type: monohull
- Construction: fiberglass
- LOA: 32.68 ft (9.96 m)
- LWL: 30.05 ft (9.16 m)
- Beam: 10.96 ft (3.34 m)
- Engine: Yanmar 3YM20 21 hp (16 kW) diesel engine

Hull appendages
- Keel: fin keel with weighted bulb
- Ballast: 3,307 lb (1,500 kg)
- Rudder: spade-type rudder

Rig
- Rig type: Bermuda rig
- I foretriangle height: 41.99 ft (12.80 m)
- J foretriangle base: 12.20 ft (3.72 m)
- P mainsail luff: 39.80 ft (12.13 m)
- E mainsail foot: 12.80 ft (3.90 m)

Sails
- Sailplan: fractional rigged sloop
- Mainsail area: 285 sq ft (26.5 m^{2})
- Jib/genoa area: 269 sq ft (25.0 m^{2})
- Spinnaker area: 1,076 sq ft (100.0 m^{2})
- Upwind sail area: 554 sq ft (51.5 m^{2})
- Downwind sail area: 1,362 sq ft (126.5 m^{2})

Racing
- PHRF: 114-135

The Sun Odyssey 33i is a French sailboat designed by Marc Lombard as a cruiser and first built in 2008.

The "i" in the designation indicates that the deck is injection-molded.

== Production ==
The design was built by Jeanneau in France, from 2008 until 2014, after which it was discontinued .

== Design ==
The Sun Odyssey 33i is a recreational keelboat, built predominantly of polyester fiberglass, with wood trim. The hull is made from solid fiberglass and the deck is a fiberglass sandwich. It has a 9/10 fractional sloop rig, with a deck-stepped mast, two sets of swept spreaders and aluminum spars with stainless steel 1X19 wire rigging. A mast-furling mainsail was a factory option. The hull has a nearly plumb stem, a reverse transom with a swimming platform, an internally mounted spade-type rudder controlled by a wheel and a fixed fin keel, optional shoal-draft keel, or stub keel and steel centerboard.

The fin keel model displaces 10,240 lb (4,645 kg) and carries 3,307 lb (1,500 kg) of cast iron ballast, while the shoal draft version displaces 10,670 lb (4,840 kg) and carries 3,737 lb (1,695 kg) of cast iron ballast. The centerboard version displaces 10,274 lb (4,660 kg) and carries 3,342 lb (1,516 kg) of external cast iron ballast.

The fin keel-equipped version of the boat has a draft of 6.23 ft (1.90 m), the shoal draft keel-equipped version of the boat has a draft of 4.82 ft (1.47 m), while the centerboard-equipped version has a draft of 7.22 ft (2.20 m) with the centerboard extended and 2.79 ft (0.85 m) with it retracted, allowing operation in shallow water.

A "performance" version of the design has a mast that is about 1 ft (30 cm) taller and a sail area that is 16% larger.

The boat is fitted with a Japanese Yanmar 3YM20 diesel engine of 21 hp (16 kW) for docking and maneuvering. The fuel tank holds 37 U.S. gallons (140 L; 31 imp gal) and the fresh water tank has a capacity of 42 U.S. gallons (160 L; 35 imp gal).

The design has sleeping accommodation for four people, with a double "V"-berth in the bow cabin, two straight settees in the main cabin and an aft cabin with a transversal double berth on the starboard side. The galley is on the starboard side just forward of the companionway ladder. The galley is L-shaped and is equipped with a two-burner stove, an ice box and a single sink. The head is located aft on the port side at the companionway steps and includes a shower. Cabin maximum headroom is 74 in (188 cm).

For sailing downwind the design may be equipped with a symmetrical spinnaker of 1,076 sq ft (100.0 m^{2}).

The design has a hull speed of 7.35 kn (13.61 km/h) and a PHRF handicap of 114 to 135.

== Operational history ==
In a 2009 review for Cruising World, Alvah Simon wrote, "the Sun Odyssey 33i could best be described as a 'platform' boat. Jeanneau provides a performance hull with a racing wheel and fits it out with a full liveaboard interior. Then the builder offers the customer an array of packages that combine different rigs, keels, propellers, and add-ons to either turbocharge the 'platform' up to a full-on around-the-cans racer or set it up as an easy-to-sail coastal or near-offshore family cruiser with an in-mast furling main."

== See also ==
- List of sailing boat types
