= Sun Odyssey 26 =

Sailboat class

Development
- Designer: Philippe Briand; Jeanneau Design Office
- Location: France
- Year: 2003
- Builder: Jeanneau
- Role: Cruiser

Boat
- Displacement: 5,024 lb (2,279 kg)
- Draft: 5.50 ft (1.68 m)

Hull
- Type: monohull
- Construction: fiberglass
- LOA: 24.50 ft (7.47 m)
- LWL: 22.17 ft (6.76 m)
- Beam: 9.67 ft (2.95 m)
- Engine: 19 hp (14 kW) diesel engine

Hull appendages
- Keel: fin keel
- Rudder: spade-type rudder

Rig
- Rig type: Bermuda rig
- I foretriangle height: 29.25 ft (8.92 m)
- J foretriangle base: 8.08 ft (2.46 m)
- P mainsail luff: 30.25 ft (9.22 m)
- E mainsail foot: 11.33 ft (3.45 m)

Sails
- Sailplan: fractional rigged sloop
- Mainsail area: 171.37 sq ft (15.921 m^{2})
- Jib/genoa area: 118.17 sq ft (10.978 m^{2})
- Total sail area: 289.54 sq ft (26.899 m^{2})

The Sun Odyssey 26 is a French sailboat that was designed by Philippe Briand and the Jeanneau Design Office, as a blue water cruiser and first built in 2003.

== Production ==
The design was built by Jeanneau in France, starting in 2003, but it is now out of production.

== Design ==
The Sun Odyssey 26 is a recreational keelboat, built predominantly of fiberglass, with wood trim. It has a fractional sloop rig, with a nearly plumb stem, a walk-through reverse transom with a swimming platform, an internally mounted spade-type rudder controlled by a tiller and a fixed fin keel or optional centerboard. It displaces 5,024 lb (2,279 kg).

The boat has a draft of 5.50 ft (1.68 m) with the standard fin keel.

The boat is fitted with a diesel engine of 19 hp (14 kW) for docking and maneuvering. The fuel tank holds 7 U.S. gallons (26 L; 5.8 imp gal) and the fresh water tank has a capacity of 29 U.S. gallons (110 L; 24 imp gal).

The design has sleeping accommodation for four people, with a double "V"-berth around a table in the bow and an aft cabin with a centered double berth. The galley is located on the starboard side just forward of the companionway ladder. The galley is equipped with a two-burner stove and a sink. The enclosed head is located opposite the galley, on the port side. Cabin headroom is 70 in (178 cm).

For sailing downwind the design may be equipped with a symmetrical spinnaker. The boat has a hull speed of 6.31 kn (11.69 km/h).

== See also ==
- List of sailing boat types
