= Sun Odyssey 29.2 =

Sailboat class

Development
- Designer: Jacques Fauroux
- Location: France
- Year: 1997
- No. built: 832
- Builder: Jeanneau
- Role: Cruiser
- Name: Sun Odyssey 29.2

Boat
- Displacement: 6,063 lb (2,750 kg)
- Draft: 4.59 ft (1.40 m)

Hull
- Type: monohull
- Construction: fiberglass
- LOA: 28.87 ft (8.80 m)
- LWL: 25.26 ft (7.70 m)
- Beam: 9.78 ft (2.98 m)
- Engine: Yanmar 2YM20 21 hp (16 kW) diesel engine

Hull appendages
- Keel: fin keel with weighted bulb
- Ballast: 2,227 lb (1,010 kg)
- Rudder: spade-type rudder

Rig
- Rig type: Bermuda rig
- I foretriangle height: 34.12 ft (10.40 m)
- J foretriangle base: 10.24 ft (3.12 m)
- P mainsail luff: 33.79 ft (10.30 m)
- E mainsail foot: 10.99 ft (3.35 m)

Sails
- Sailplan: fractional rigged sloop
- Mainsail area: 215 sq ft (20.0 m^{2})
- Jib/genoa area: 215 sq ft (20.0 m^{2})
- Spinnaker area: 570 sq ft (53 m^{2})
- Upwind sail area: 431 sq ft (40.0 m^{2})
- Downwind sail area: 786 sq ft (73.0 m^{2})

The Sun Odyssey 29.2 is a French sailboat that was designed by Jacques Fauroux as a family cruiser and first built in 1997.

== Production ==
The design was built by Jeanneau in France, from 1997 to 2008 with 832 boats completed, but it is now out of production.

== Design ==
The Sun Odyssey 29.2 is a recreational keelboat, built predominantly of polyester fiberglass, with wood trim. The hull is solid fiberglass, while the deck is a fiberglass-balsa sandwich. It has a fractional sloop rig, with a deck-stepped mast, a single set of swept spreaders and aluminum spars with continuous stainless steel wire rigging. The hull has a raked stem, a reverse transom, an internally mounted spade-type rudder controlled by a tiller and a fixed fin keel or optional stub keel and steel centerboard. The fin keel model displaces 6,063 lb (2,750 kg) and carries 2,227 lb (1,010 kg) of cast iron ballast, while the centerboard version displaces 6,570 lb (2,980 kg) and carries 2,734 lb (1,240 kg) of exterior cast iron ballast.

The keel-equipped version of the boat has a draft of 4.59 ft (1.40 m), while the centerboard-equipped version has a draft of 5.25 ft (1.60 m) with the centerboard extended and 2.5 ft (0.76 m) with it retracted, allowing operation in shallow water.

The boat is fitted with a Japanese Yanmar 2YM20 diesel engine of 21 hp (16 kW) for docking and maneuvering. The fuel tank holds 12 U.S. gallons (45 L; 10.0 imp gal) and the fresh water tank has a capacity of 26 U.S. gallons (98 L; 22 imp gal).

The design has sleeping accommodation for six people, with a double "V"-berth in the bow cabin, two straight settees in the main cabin and an aft cabin with a double berth on the port side. The galley is located on the port side just forward of the companionway ladder. The galley is L-shaped and is equipped with a two-burner stove, an ice box and a double sink. A navigation station is opposite the galley, on the starboard side. The head is located just aft of the bow cabin on the starboard side. Cabin maximum headroom is 71 in (180 cm).

For sailing downwind the design may be equipped with a symmetrical spinnaker of 570 sq ft (53 m^{2}).

The design has a hull speed of 6.74 kn (12.48 km/h).

== See also ==
- List of sailing boat types
