= Tonic 23 =

Sailboat class

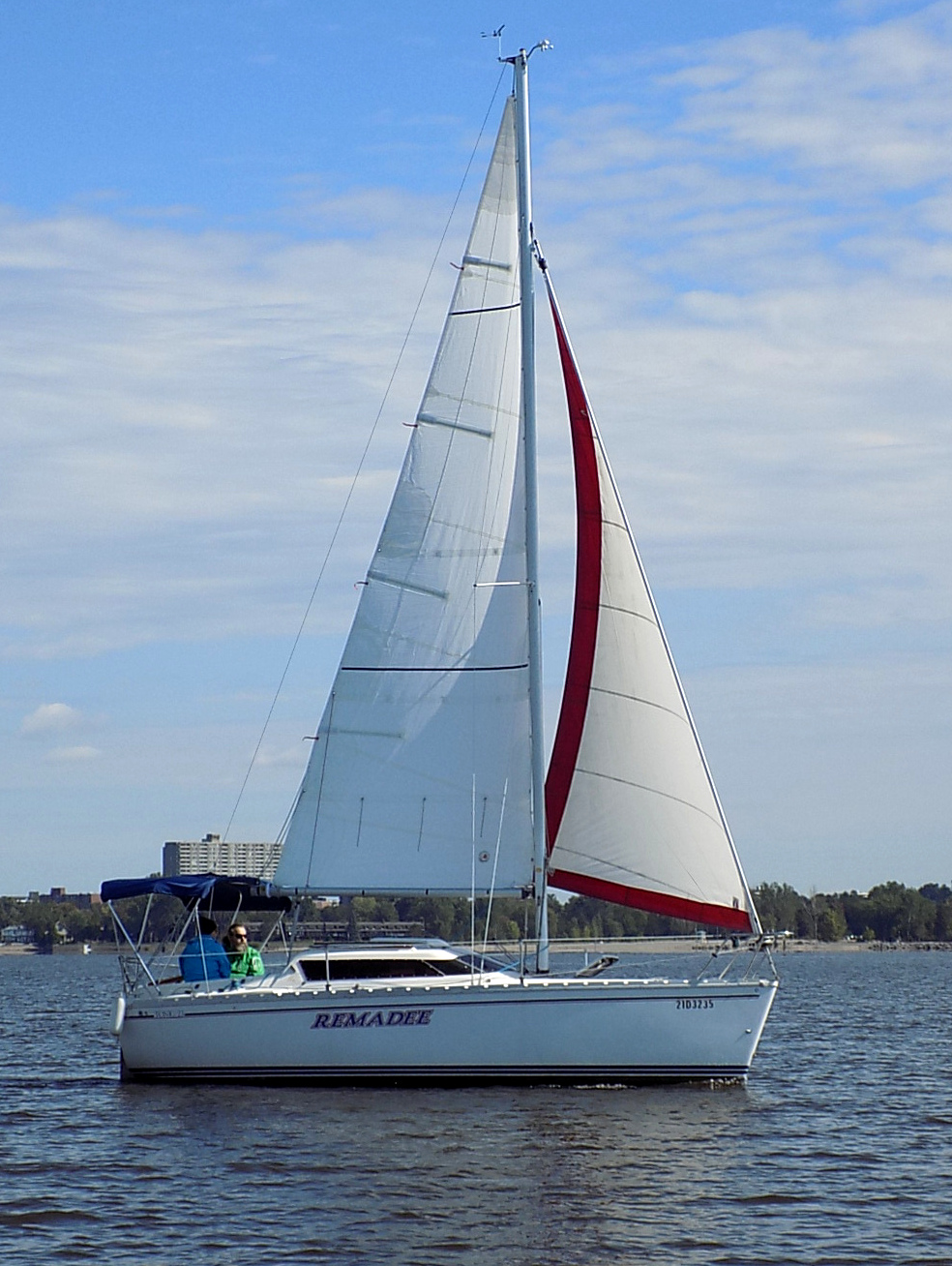

Development
- Designer: Philippe Harlé
- Location: France
- Year: 1985
- No. built: 750
- Builder: Jeanneau
- Name: Tonic 23

Boat
- Displacement: 2,932 lb (1,330 kg)
- Draft: 4.5 ft (1.4 m)

Hull
- Type: Monohull
- Construction: Fiberglass
- LOA: 24 ft (7.3 m)
- LWL: 20.3 ft (6.2 m)
- Beam: 8.1 ft (2.5 m)
- Engine: Outboard motor

Hull appendages
- Keel: fin keel
- Ballast: 1,058 lb (480 kg)
- Rudder: transom-mounted rudder

Rig
- Rig type: Bermuda rig
- I foretriangle height: 23.6 ft (7.2 m)
- J foretriangle base: 7.9 ft (2.4 m)
- P mainsail luff: 27.9 ft (8.5 m)
- E mainsail foot: 10.0 ft (3.0 m)

Sails
- Sailplan: Fractional rigged sloop
- Mainsail area: 157 sq ft (14.6 m^{2})
- Jib/genoa area: 140 sq ft (13 m^{2})
- Total sail area: 316 sq ft (29.4 m^{2})

Racing
- PHRF: 225

The Tonic 23 is a French trailerable sailboat, that was first built in 1985.

== Production ==
The design was built by Jeanneau in France from 1985 until 1992, but it is now out of production. During its production run about 750 boats were completed.

== Design ==
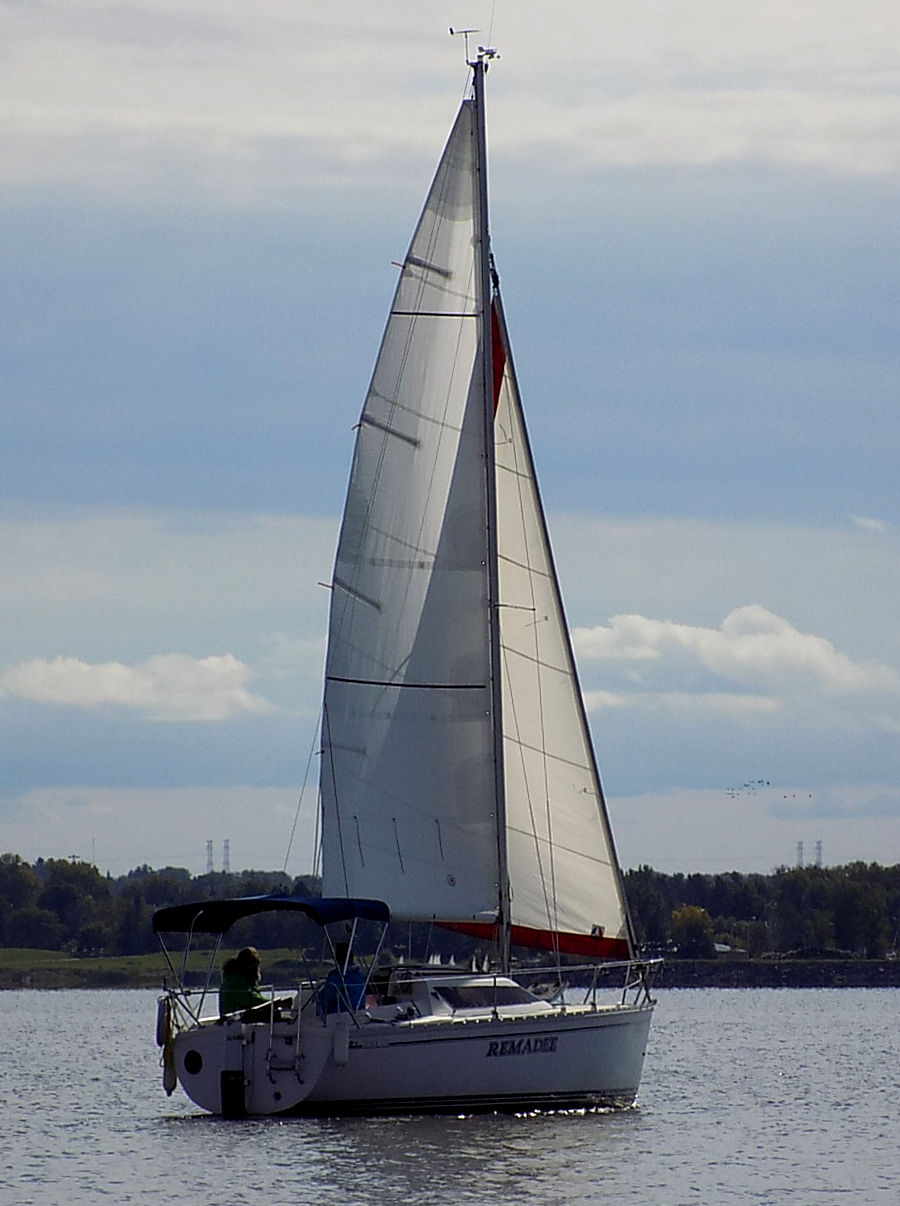
Tonic 23

The Tonic 23 was designed by Philippe Harlé as a coastal cruiser and is a recreational keelboat, built predominantly of monolithic polyester fiberglass, with wood trim. The deck includes a balsawood core. It has a fractional sloop rig with a deck-stepped aluminium mast with a single set of swept-back spreaders, a raked stem, a vertical transom, a transom-hung rudder controlled by tiller and a fixed fin keel or optionally a stub keel and centerboard. The fixed keel version displaces 2,866 lb (1,300 kg) and carries 992 lb (450 kg) of cast iron ballast, while the stub keel and centerboard version displaces 2,932 lb (1,330 kg) and carries 1,058 lb (480 kg) of cast iron exterior ballast with the centerboard made from steel.

The keel-equipped version of the boat has a draft of 3.67 ft (1.12 m), while the centerboard-equipped version has a draft of 4.50 ft (1.37 m) with the centerboard extended and 2.33 ft (0.71 m) with it retracted, allowing ground transportation on a trailer. It can be equipped with a spinnaker of 364 sq ft (33.8 m^{2}).

The boat is normally fitted with a small 3 to 6 hp (2 to 4 kW) outboard motor for docking and maneuvering or optionally an inboard motor could be installed. The design has a hull speed of 6.04 kn (11.19 km/h) and the fresh water tank has a capacity of 5.3 U.S. gallons (20 L; 4.4 imp gal)

The design has sleeping accommodation for four people, with a double "V"-berth in the bow cabin, with a drop-down dinette table and an aft cabin with a double berth on the port side. The galley is located on the port side just forward of the companionway ladder. The galley is L-shaped and is equipped with a stove, icebox and a sink. A navigation station is opposite the galley, on the starboard side. The enclosed head is located on the starboard side at the companionway. Cabin headroom is 67 in (170 cm).

The design has a PHRF racing average handicap of 225 and a hull speed of 6.0 kn (11.1 km/h).

In a 2010 review Steve Henkel wrote, "best features: Comparing statistics among the comps, the 5' 7" headroom featured in the Tonic pops right out. Also a plus is her beam ... To our knowledge, the Tonic is not known for her speed, so her average PHRF rating of 225 seems low to us ... Worst features: The Tonic’s iron keel will require regular maintenance to keep from weeping rust."
