= Espace 990 =

French sailboat class

Development
- Designer: Philippe Briand (naval architect)
- Location: France
- Year: 1985
- Builder: Jeanneau
- Role: Cruiser
- Name: Espace 990

Boat
- Displacement: 10,538 lb (4,780 kg)
- Draft: 5.08 ft (1.55 m)

Hull
- Type: monohull
- Construction: fiberglass
- LOA: 32.48 ft (9.90 m)
- LWL: 26.92 ft (8.21 m)
- Beam: 11.15 ft (3.40 m)
- Engine: inboard motor

Hull appendages
- Keel: fin keel
- Ballast: 4,619 lb (2,095 kg)
- Rudder: spade-type rudder

Rig
- Rig type: Bermuda rig
- I foretriangle height: 41.30 ft (12.59 m)
- J foretriangle base: 12.00 ft (3.66 m)
- P mainsail luff: 35.10 ft (10.70 m)
- E mainsail foot: 10.90 ft (3.32 m)

Sails
- Sailplan: masthead sloop
- Mainsail area: 191.30 sq ft (17.772 m^{2})
- Jib/genoa area: 247.80 sq ft (23.021 m^{2})
- Total sail area: 439.10 sq ft (40.794 m^{2})

The Espace 990 (English: Space) is a French sailboat that was designed by Philippe Briand as a cruiser and first built in 1985. The boat is part of the Espace series of cruising sailboats and its designation indicates its length overall in centimeters.

== Production ==
The design was built by Jeanneau in France, from 1985 until 1989, but it is now out of production.

== Design ==
The Espace 990 is a recreational keelboat, built predominantly of fiberglass, with wood trim. It has a masthead sloop rig, with aluminum spars and stainless steel wire rigging. The hull has a raked stem, a reverse transom with a swimming platform, an internally mounted spade-type rudder controlled by two wheels, one in the cockpit and one in the wheelhouse. It has a fixed fin keel, or optional stub keel with a retractable centerboard. It displaces 10,538 lb (4,780 kg) and carries 4,619 lb (2,095 kg) of ballast.

The boat is fitted with an inboard engine for docking and maneuvering. The fuel tank holds 40 U.S. gallons (150 L; 33 imp gal) and the fresh water tank has a capacity of 53 U.S. gallons (200 L; 44 imp gal). The keel-equipped version of the boat has a draft of 5.08 ft (1.55 m).

The design has sleeping accommodation for six people, with a double "V"-berth in the bow cabin, a U-shaped settee around a dinette table in the main cabin and an aft cabin with a double berth on the starboard side. The galley is located amidships on the starboard side. The galley is equipped with a two-burner stove, ice box and a sink. The navigation station is aft of the galley, on the port side inside the wheelhouse. The head is located just aft of the bow cabin on the port side and includes a shower.

The design has a hull speed of 6.95 kn (12.87 km/h).

== See also ==
- List of sailing boat types
