= Sun Odyssey 24.2 =

1990s French recreational keelboat

Development
- Designer: Jacques Fauroux
- Location: France
- Year: 1998
- Builder: Jeanneau
- Role: Cruiser

Boat
- Displacement: 4,200 lb (1,905 kg)
- Draft: 3.61 ft (1.10 m)

Hull
- Type: monohull
- Construction: fiberglass
- LOA: 23.95 ft (7.30 m)
- LWL: 21.67 ft (6.61 m)
- Beam: 8.16 ft (2.49 m)
- Engine: outboard motor

Hull appendages
- Keel: fin keel, with weighted bulb
- Rudder: spade-type rudder

Rig
- Rig type: Bermuda rig
- I foretriangle height: 28.21 ft (8.60 m)
- J foretriangle base: 9.19 ft (2.80 m)
- P mainsail luff: 27.56 ft (8.40 m)
- E mainsail foot: 9.84 ft (3.00 m)

Sails
- Sailplan: fractional rigged sloop
- Mainsail area: 135.60 sq ft (12.598 m^{2})
- Jib/genoa area: 129.62 sq ft (12.042 m^{2})
- Total sail area: 265.22 sq ft (24.640 m^{2})

The Sun Odyssey 24.2 is a recreational keelboat first built in 1998 by Jeanneau in France, and now out of production.

Built predominantly of fiberglass, with wood trim. It has a fractional sloop rig, a nearly plumb stem, a reverse transom, an internally mounted spade-type rudder controlled by a tiller and a fixed fin keel with a weighted bulb or optional stub keel and centerboard. It displaces 4,200 lb (1,905 kg).

The keel-equipped version of the boat has a draft of 3.61 ft (1.10 m), while the centerboard-equipped version has a draft of 4.59 ft (1.40 m) with the centerboard extended and 2.13 ft (0.65 m) with it retracted, allowing operation in shallow water or ground transportation on a trailer.

The boat is normally fitted with a small outboard motor for docking and maneuvering, but an inboard engine was a factory option.

The design has sleeping accommodation for six people, with a double "V"-berth in the bow cabin, two straight settees in the main cabin and an aft cabin with a double berth on the port side. The galley is located on the port side just forward of the companionway ladder. The galley is U-shaped and is equipped with a two-burner stove and a sink. The head is located just aft of companionway on the starboard side.

The design has a hull speed of 6.24 kn (11.56 km/h).
