= Jeanneau =

Sailboat manufacturer

- Company type: Private
- Industry: Boat building
- Founded: 1957; 69 years ago
- Founder: Henri Jeanneau
- Headquarters: Les Herbiers, France
- Products: Sailboats
- Parent: Groupe Beneteau
- Divisions: Jeanneau Advanced Technologies; Lagoon catamaran
- Website: www.jeanneau.com

Jeanneau is a French boatyard in Les Herbiers, in the Vendée département, which has produced yachts since 1957. It was founded by Henri Jeanneau, a hardware store owner, who began by producing power boats.

Jeanneau specializes in monohulls, but it created a specialist multihull line, Lagoon catamarans. Jeanneau (and Lagoon) became part of Groupe Beneteau in 1995.

== History ==
Henri Jeanneau's first boats in 1957 were wooden outboard motor-powered dinghy designs. He quickly moved to producing boats from fiberglass and by 1960 his motorboats, including the Jeanneau Sea-bird, were made from this new material, followed by the first sailboats in 1964.

In 1970 the company was purchased by the American conglomerate, Bangor Punta. By mid-1980 the company was sold again and became part of Chatellier SA. In 1990 there was a joint venture with Italian Ferretti Craft to build a series of yachts, but the project did not last long. In 1995 the company was bought out by Groupe Beneteau and became part of the largest global sailboat-building enterprise.

In the mid-1990s some Jeanneau designs were built in Polish boat yards, including the Sun Odyssey 24.1. In 2001 Ostroda Yachts of Poland became part of Jeanneau.

The Jeanneau Advanced Technologies division was set up to build custom projects, such as the trimarans for the film Waterworld and some America's Cup designs.

== Boats ==
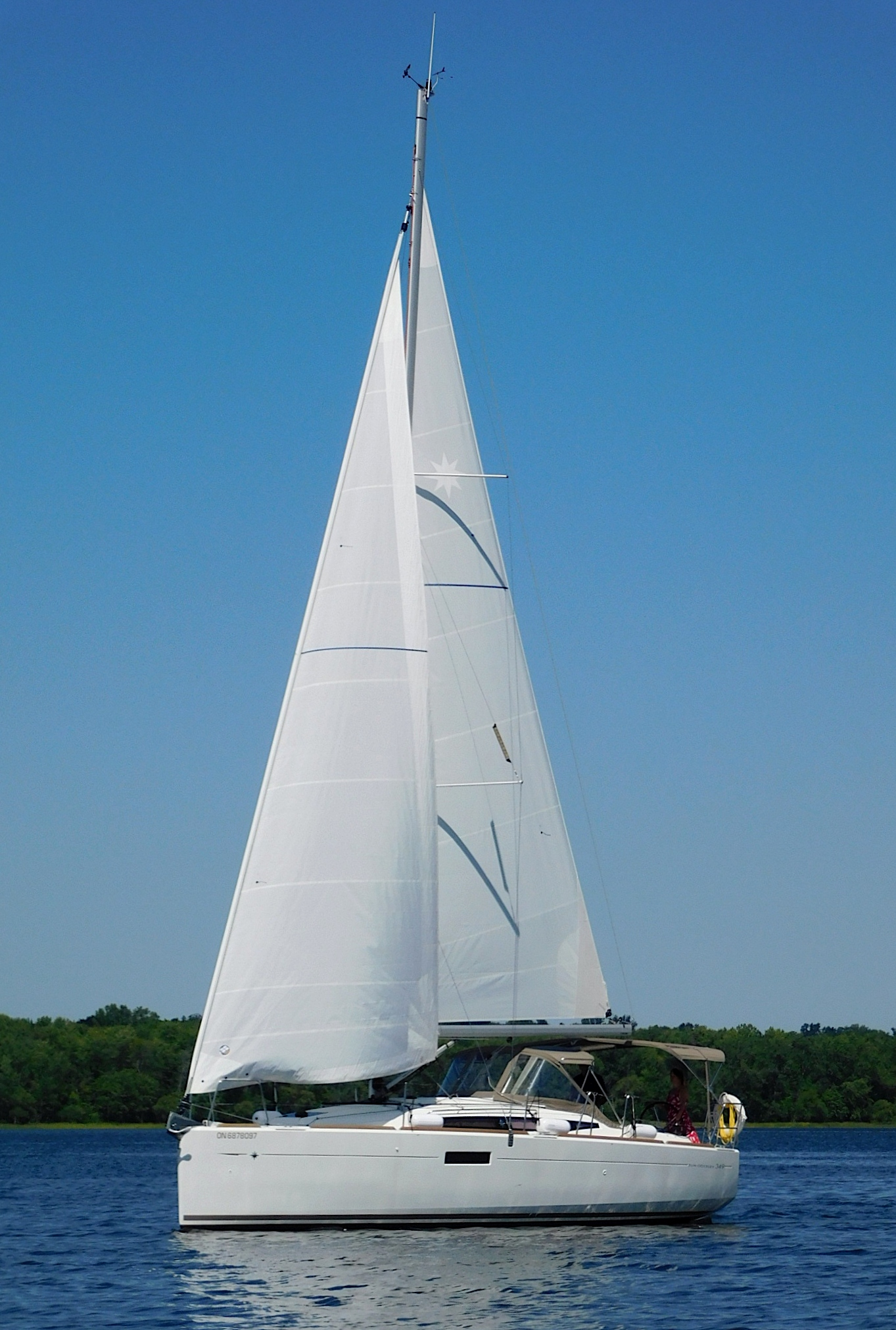
Sun Odyssey 349

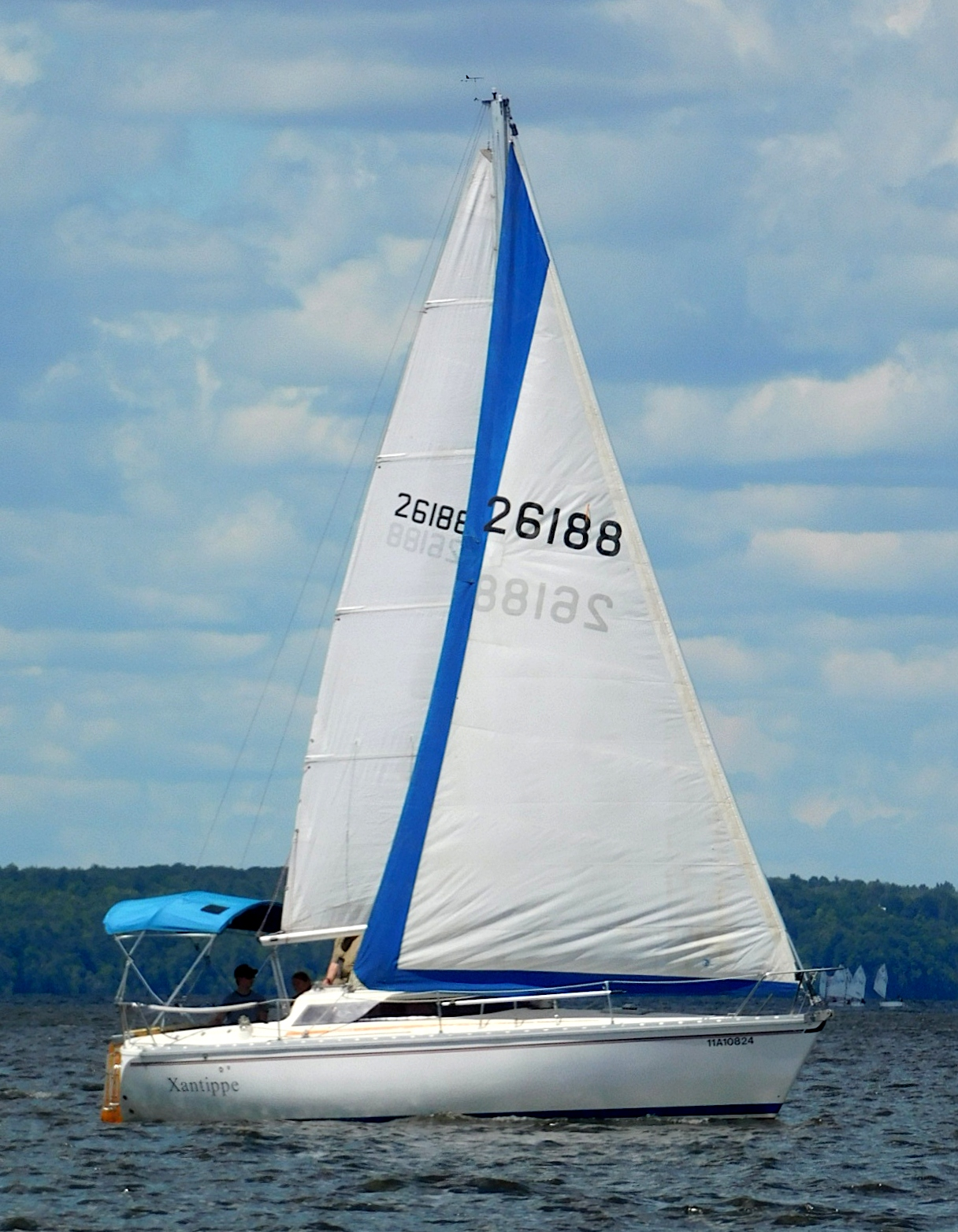
Fantasia 27

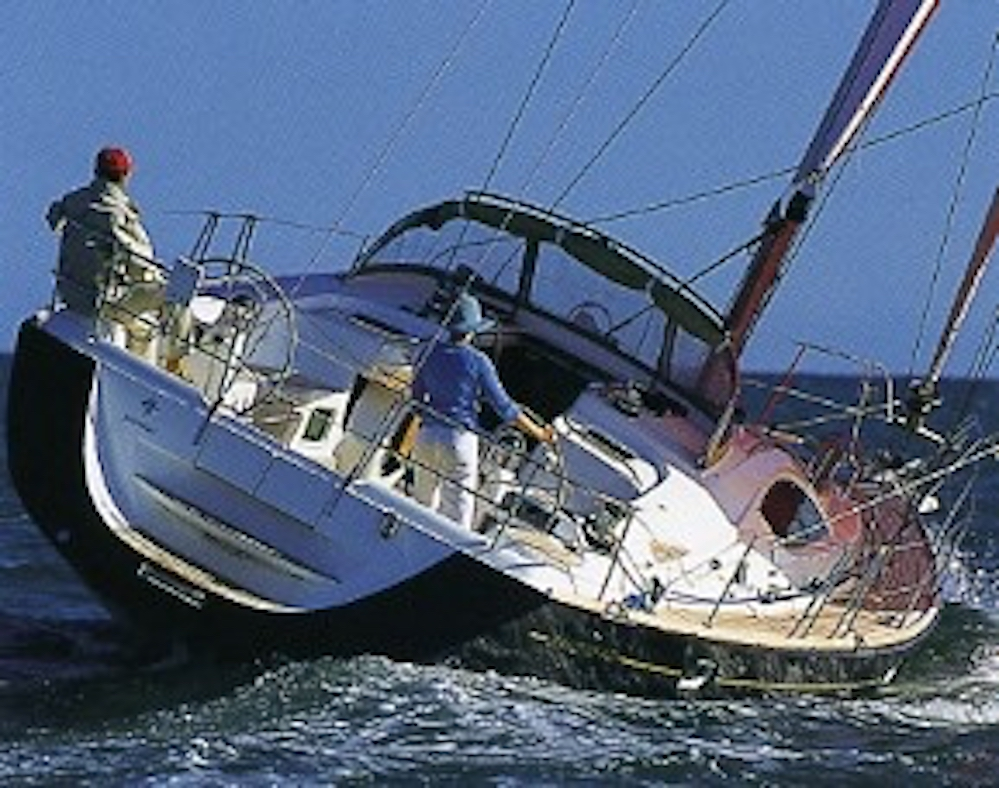
Sun Odyssey 49 DS under way

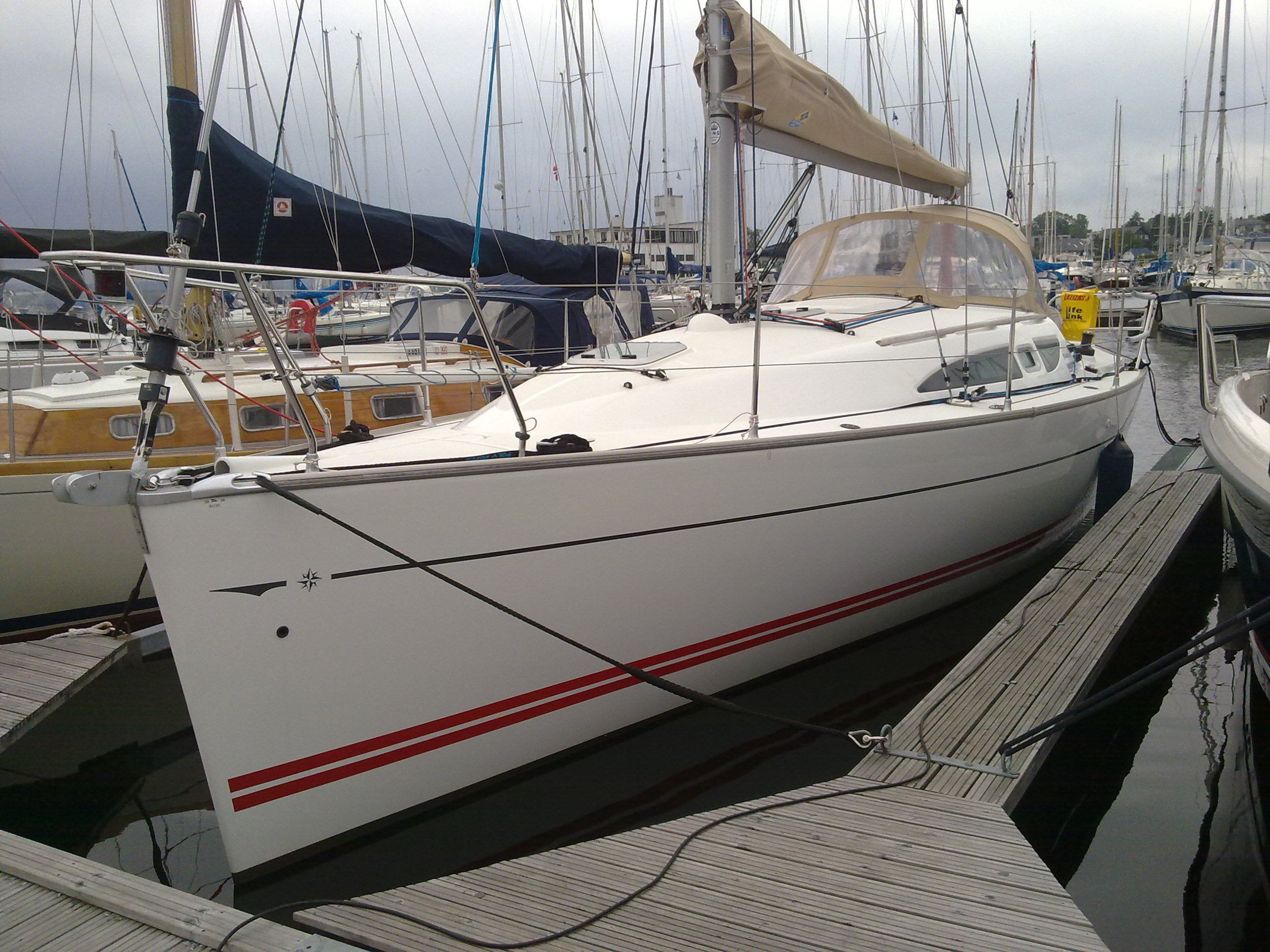
Sun Fast 32i

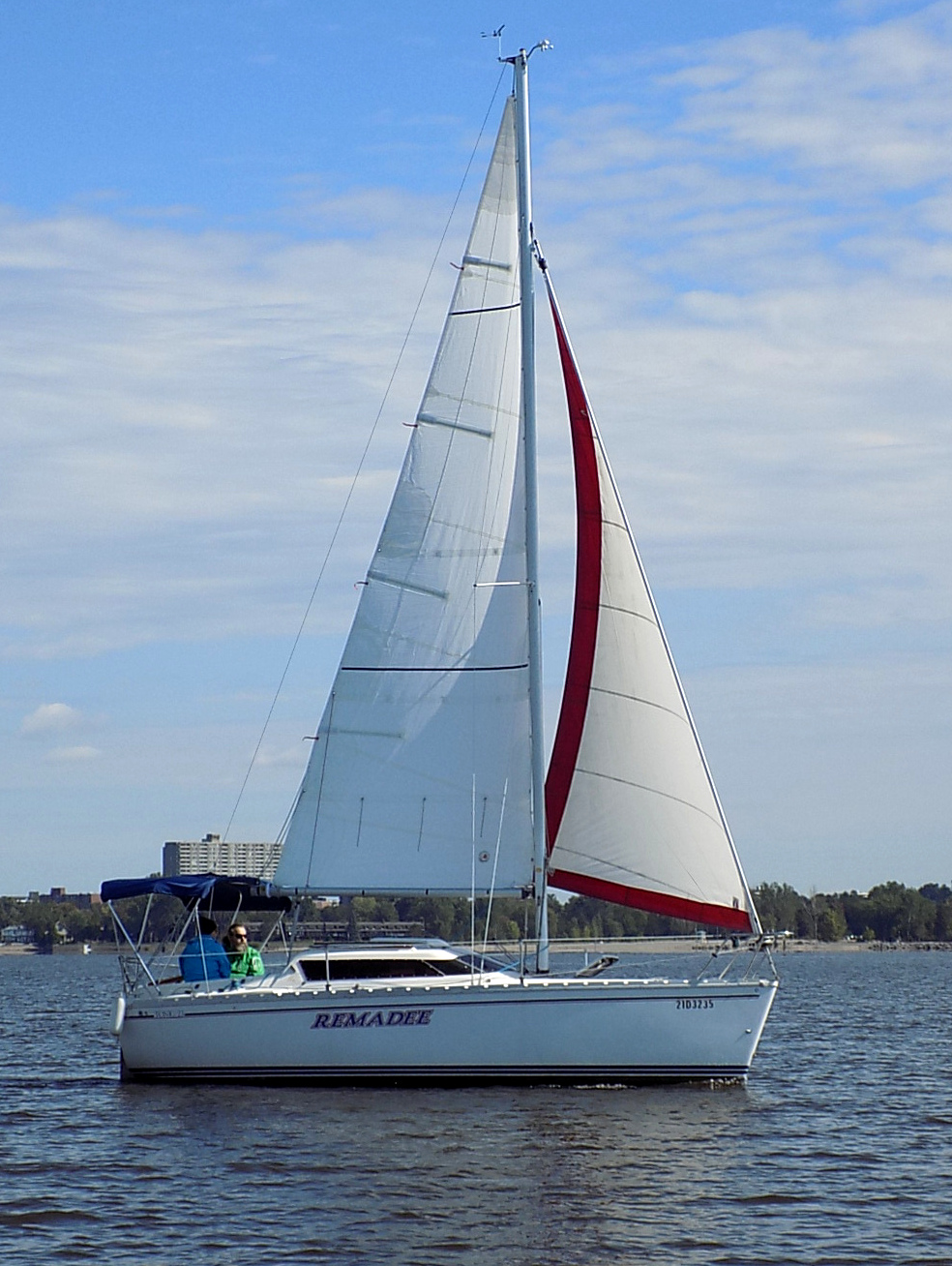
Tonic 23

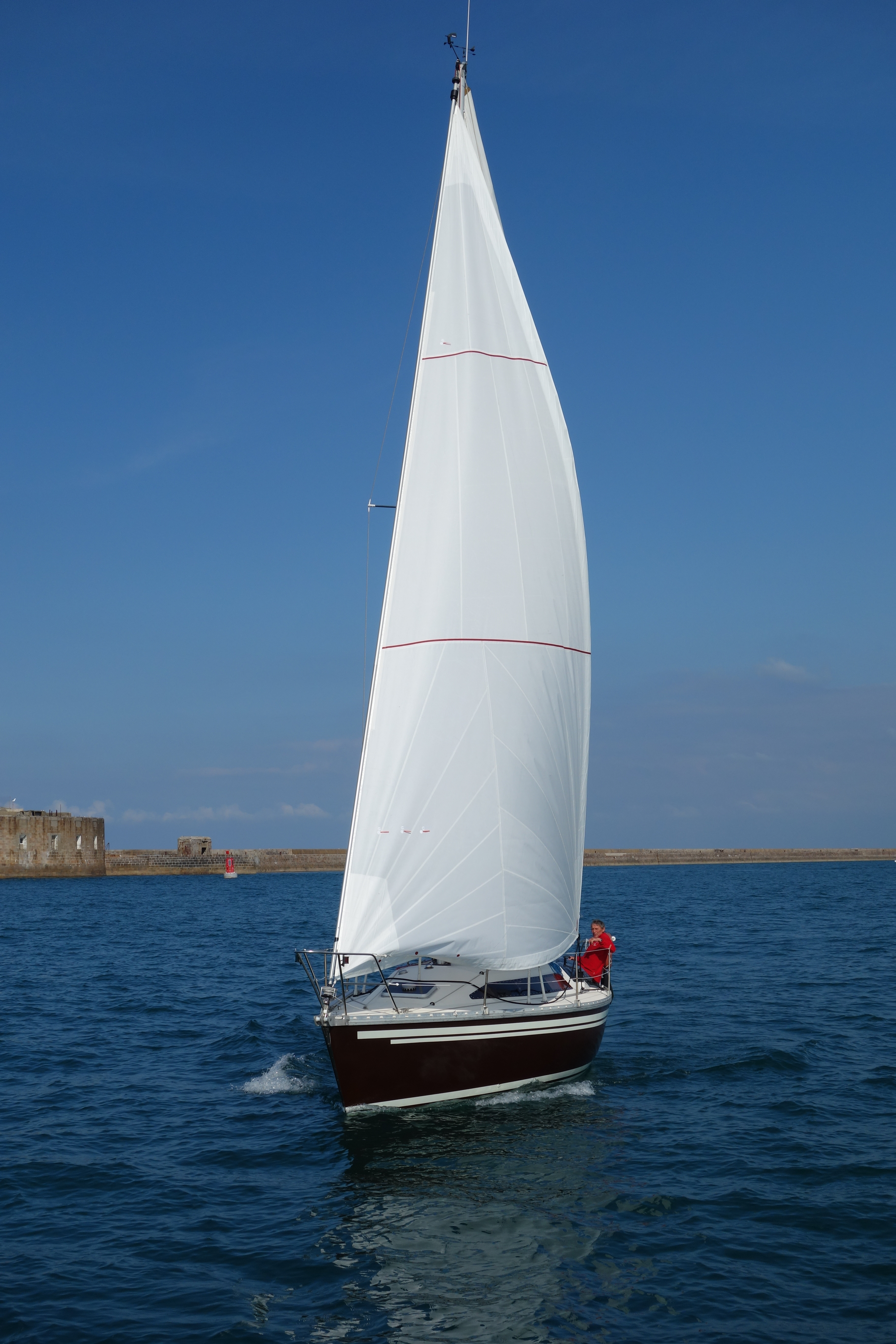
Rush 31

Designs built by the company include:

- Jeanneau Sea-bird - 1960
- Alize 20 - 1963
- Jeanneau Storm - 1966
- Jeanneau Captain - 1968
- Jeanneau Arcachonnais - 1969
- Sangria 25 - 1969
- Jeanneau Beniguet - 1970
- Jeanneau Cape Breton - 1970
- Jeanneau Folie Douce - 1970
- Jeanneau Love Love - 1971
- Jeanneau Metaf - 1972
- Jeanneau Poker - 1972
- Gin Fizz 37 - 1974
- Melody 34 - 1974
- Aquila 27 - 1975
- Jeanneau Brin de Folie - 1975
- Jeanneau Flirt - 1976
- Jeanneau Brio - 1979
- Rush 31 - 1979
- Rush Royale 31 - 1979
- Symphonie 32 - 1979
- Espace 1000 - 1980
- Microsail - 1980
- Sun Fizz 40 - 1980
- Espace 800 - 1981
- Espace 1300 - 1981
- Fantasia 27 - 1981
- Trinidad 48 - 1981
- Attalia 32 - 1982
- Fun 23 - 1982
- Regatta 39 - 1982
- Sun Shine 36 - 1982
- Arcadia 30 - 1983
- Bahia 22 - 1983
- Eolia 25 - 1983
- Espace 620 - 1983
- Sun Kiss 45 - 1983
- Sun Kiss 47 - 1983
- Sun Shine 38 - 1983
- Fantasia 37 - 1984
- Legende 1 Ton - 1984
- Selection 37 - 1984
- Sun Fast 1/2 Ton - 1984
- Sun Legende 41 - 1984
- Sun Rise 34 - 1984
- Espace 990 - 1985
- Espace 1100 - 1985
- Sun Fast 20 - 1985
- Tonic 23 - 1985
- Tonic 23 CB - 1985
- CAP 450 - 1986
- CAP 540 - 1986
- Sun Light 30 - 1986
- Sun Odyssey 43 - 1986
- Lagoon 55 (1987)
- Sun Dream 28 - 1987
- Sun Magic 44 - 1987
- Sun Odyssey 44 - 1987
- Sun Way 27 - 1987
- Sun Way 28 - 1987
- Sun Way 28 CB - 1987
- Voyage 12.5 - 1987
- Sun Charm 39 - 1988
- Sun Dance 36 - 1988
- Voyage 11.2 - 1988
- Sun Fast 39 - 1989
- Sun Liberty 34 - 1989
- Sun Odyssey 51 - 1989
- Sun Way 21 - 1989
- Lagoon 42 - 1990
- Sun Fast 41 - 1990
- Sun Odyssey 36 - 1990
- Sun Odyssey 39 - 1990
- Sun Odyssey 42 - 1990
- Jeanneau One Design 35 - 1991
- Lagoon 37 - 1991
- Sun Fast 31 - 1991
- Sun Odyssey 31 - 1991
- Sun Odyssey 34 - 1991
- Sun Odyssey 47 - 1991
- Sun Odyssey 47 CC - 1991
- Sun Fast 52 - 1992
- Sun Odyssey 33 - 1992
- Sun Odyssey 42.1 - 1992
- Sun Fast 32 - 1993
- International 50 - 1994
- Mini JOD - 1994
- Sun Fast 17 - 1994
- Sun Fast 36 - 1994
- Sun Odyssey 28.1 - 1994
- Sun Odyssey 32.1 - 1994
- Sun Odyssey 37.1 - 1994
- Sun Odyssey 43 DS - 1994
- Jeanneau One Design 24 - 1994
- Sun Odyssey 42.2 - 1995
- Sun Odyssey 45.1 - 1995
- Sun Odyssey 52.2 - 1995
- Lagoon 35 - 1995
- Sun Fast 42 - 1996
- Sun Odyssey 37.2 - 1996
- Sun Odyssey 42 CC - 1996
- Lagoon 410 - 1997
- Sun Odyssey 29.2 - 1997
- Sun Odyssey 32.2 - 1997
- Sun Odyssey 45.2 - 1997
- Lagoon 470 - 1998
- Stardust 342 - 1998
- Stardust 343 - 1998
- Sun Fast 26 - 1998
- Sun Odyssey 24.2 - 1998
- Sun Odyssey 34.2 - 1998
- Sun Odyssey 36.2 - 1998
- Sun Odyssey 37 - 1998
- Sun Odyssey 40 - 1998
- Jeanneau 34.2 - 1999
- Sun 2000 - 1999
- Lagoon 380 - 2000
- Sun Fast 37 - 2000
- Sun Odyssey 40 DS - 2000
- Sun Fast 32i - 2001
- Moorings 32 - 2002
- Sun Odyssey 32 - 2002
- Sun Fast 26 - 2003
- Sun Fast 40 - 2003
- Sun Fast 43 - 2003
- Sun Odyssey 26 - 2003
- Sun Odyssey 35 - 2003
- Sun Odyssey 49 - 2003
- Sun 2500 - 2004
- Sun Fast 35 - 2004
- Sun Fast 40.3 - 2004
- Sun Odyssey 40.3 - 2004
- Sun Odyssey 45 - 2004
- Sun Odyssey 49 DS - 2004
- Sun Odyssey 54 DS - 2004
- Sun Odyssey 32i - 2005
- Sun Odyssey 39i - 2005
- Sun Odyssey 42i - 2005
- Sun Odyssey 42 DS - 2007
- Sun Odyssey 45 DS - 2007
- Jeanneau Yachts 53 - 2008
- Sun Fast 3200 - 2008
- Sun Odyssey 30i - 2008
- Sun Odyssey 33i - 2008
- Sun Odyssey 39 DS - 2008
- Sun Odyssey 50 DS - 2008
- Jeanneau Yachts 57 - 2009
- Sun Odyssey 36i - 2009
- Sun Odyssey 44i - 2009
- Sun Odyssey 49i - 2009
- Sun Odyssey 409 - 2010
- Sun Odyssey 379 - 2011
- Sun Odyssey 439 - 2011
- Sun Odyssey 44 DS - 2011
- Sun Odyssey 509 - 2011
- Sun Fast 3600 - 2012
- Sun Odyssey 41 DS - 2013
- Sun Odyssey 469 - 2013
- Sun Odyssey 349 - 2014
- Jeanneau Yachts 51 - 2015
- Jeanneau Yachts 54 - 2015
- Jeanneau Yachts 64 - 2015
- Sun Odyssey 389 - 2015
- Sun Odyssey 419 - 2015
- Sun Odyssey 449 - 2015
- Sun Odyssey 519 - 2015
- Jeanneau Yachts 58 - 2016
- Sun Odyssey 440 - 2017
- Sun Odyssey 319 - 2018
- Sun Odyssey 410 - 2018
- Sun Odyssey 490 - 2018
- Sun Fast 3300 - 2019
- Jeanneau Yachts 60 - 2021
- Jeanneau Yachts 65 - 2022
- Sun Odyssey 380 - 2022
- Jeanneau Yachts 55 - 2023
- Sun Fast 30 One Design - 2023
