= Sun Fast 42 =

Sailboat class

Development
- Designer: Philippe Briand
- Location: France
- Year: 1996
- No. built: 25
- Builder: Jeanneau
- Role: Cruiser-Racer
- Name: Sun Fast 42

Boat
- Displacement: 18,739 lb (8,500 kg)
- Draft: 6.07 ft (1.85 m)

Hull
- Type: monohull
- Construction: fiberglass
- LOA: 41.67 ft (12.70 m)
- LWL: 35.07 ft (10.69 m)
- Beam: 12.83 ft (3.91 m)
- Engine: Yanmar 4JH 60 hp (45 kW) diesel engine

Hull appendages
- Keel: fin keel with weighted bulb
- Ballast: 7,275 lb (3,300 kg)
- Rudder: spade-type rudder

Rig
- Rig type: Bermuda rig
- I foretriangle height: 54.79 ft (16.70 m)
- J foretriangle base: 15.35 ft (4.68 m)
- P mainsail luff: 48.23 ft (14.70 m)
- E mainsail foot: 16.73 ft (5.10 m)

Sails
- Sailplan: masthead sloop
- Mainsail area: 466 sq ft (43.3 m^{2})
- Jib/genoa area: 642 sq ft (59.6 m^{2})
- Spinnaker area: 1,449 sq ft (134.6 m^{2})
- Upwind sail area: 1,108 sq ft (102.9 m^{2})
- Downwind sail area: 1,915 sq ft (177.9 m^{2})

The Sun Fast 42 is a French sailboat that was designed by Philippe Briand as an offshore cruiser-racer and first built in 1996.

The Sun Fast 42 is part of the Sun Fast sailboat range.

== Production ==
The design was built by Jeanneau in France, from 1996 to 1999, with 25 boats completed, but it is now out of production.

== Design ==
The Sun Fast 42 is a recreational keelboat, built predominantly of polyester fiberglass, with the hull solid fiberglass and the deck a fiberglass sandwich. It has a masthead sloop rig, with a deck-stepped mast, two sets of 8° swept spreaders and aluminum spars with stainless steel wire rigging. The hull has a slightly raked stem, a reverse transom with steps and a fold-out swimming platform, an internally mounted spade-type rudder controlled by a wheel and a fixed fin keel with a weighted bulb or optional deep-draft keel. The fin keel model displaces 18,960 lb (8,600 kg) and carries 7,275 lb (3,300 kg) of iron ballast, while the deep draft version displaces 18,739 lb (8,500 kg) and carries 7,055 lb (3,200 kg) of lead ballast.

The boat has a draft of 6.07 ft (1.85 m) with the standard keel and 7.54 ft (2.30 m) with the optional deep draft keel.

The boat is fitted with a Japanese Yanmar 4JH diesel engine of 60 hp (45 kW) for docking and maneuvering. The fuel tank holds 40 U.S. gallons (150 L; 33 imp gal) and the fresh water tank has a capacity of 92 U.S. gallons (350 L; 77 imp gal).

The design has sleeping accommodation for up to eight people, with a "team" interior or "owner's" interior. Both interiors have a main salon with a U-shaped settee and straight settee, plus two aft cabins, each with a double berth. The team version has two bunks in the forepeak, while the owners version has a single "V"-berth. The galley is located on the starboard side just forward of the companionway ladder. The galley is U-shaped and is equipped with a two-burner stove, an ice box and a double sink. A navigation station is opposite the galley, on the port side. The head is located just aft of the navigation station on the port side. The owner's version has a second head just aft of the bow cabin on the starboard side. Cabin maximum headroom is 80 in (203 cm).

For sailing downwind the design may be equipped with a symmetrical spinnaker of 1,449 sq ft (134.6 m^{2}).

The design has a hull speed of 7.94 kn (14.70 km/h)

== Operational history ==
The boat was at one time supported by a class club that organized racing events, the Sun Fast Association.

== See also ==
- List of sailing boat types
