= Jeanneau One Design 24 =

Sailboat class

Development
- Designer: Daniel Andrieu
- Location: France
- Year: 1994
- Builder: Jeanneau
- Role: Racer

Boat
- Displacement: 2,530 lb (1,148 kg)
- Draft: 4.50 ft (1.37 m) with keel down

Hull
- Type: monohull
- Construction: fiberglass
- LOA: 23.92 ft (7.29 m)
- LWL: 20.75 ft (6.32 m)
- Beam: 8.17 ft (2.49 m)
- Engine: outboard motor

Hull appendages
- Keel: lifting keel
- Ballast: 726 lb (329 kg)
- Rudder: spade-type rudder

Rig
- Rig type: Bermuda rig
- I foretriangle height: 25.75 ft (7.85 m)
- J foretriangle base: 7.71 ft (2.35 m)
- P mainsail luff: 29.53 ft (9.00 m)
- E mainsail foot: 10.01 ft (3.05 m)

Sails
- Sailplan: fractional rigged sloop
- Mainsail area: 147.80 sq ft (13.731 m^{2})
- Jib/genoa area: 99.27 sq ft (9.222 m^{2})
- Total sail area: 247.06 sq ft (22.953 m^{2})

The Jeanneau One Design 24, also called the JOD 24, is a French trailerable sailboat that was designed by Daniel Andrieu as a one design racer and first built in 1994.

== Production ==
The design was built by Jeanneau in France, starting in 1994, but it is now out of production.

== Design ==
The Jeanneau One Design 24 is a racing keelboat, built predominantly of fiberglass. It has a 7/8 fractional sloop rig with a deck-stepped mast, a nearly plumb stem, a reverse transom an internally mounted spade-type rudder controlled by a tiller and a lifting keel with a weighted bulb. It displaces 2,530 lb (1,148 kg) and carries 726 lb (329 kg) of ballast.

The boat has a draft of 4.50 ft (1.37 m) with the keel extended and 1.42 ft (0.43 m) with it retracted, allowing operation in shallow water or ground transportation on a trailer. A custom boat trailer for the design was a factory option.

The design has minimal accommodation for four people, consisting of two full-length settees, plus central stowage. A galley was a factory option.

The design has a hull speed of 6.1 kn (11.3 km/h).

== See also ==
- List of sailing boat types
