= Sun Odyssey 49 =

Sailboat class

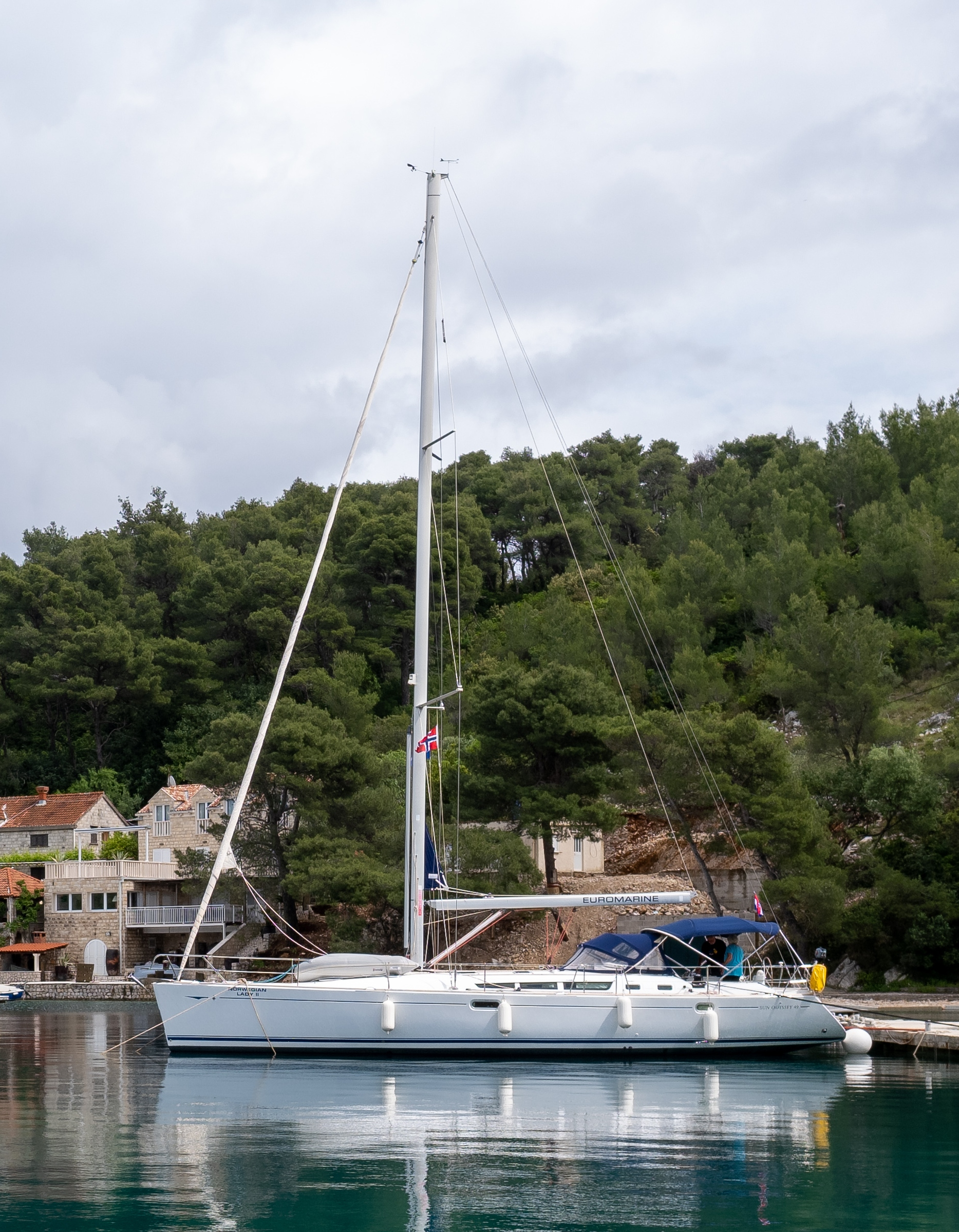

Development
- Designer: Philippe Briand
- Location: France
- Year: 2003
- Builder: Jeanneau
- Role: Cruiser
- Name: Sun Odyssey 49

Boat
- Displacement: 27,778 lb (12,600 kg)
- Draft: 7.75 ft (2.36 m)

Hull
- Type: monohull
- Construction: fiberglass
- LOA: 49.16 ft (14.98 m)
- LWL: 42.33 ft (12.90 m)
- Beam: 14.75 ft (4.50 m)
- Engine: Yanmar 68 hp (51 kW) diesel engine

Hull appendages
- Keel: fin keel with weighted bulb
- Ballast: 8,025 lb (3,640 kg)
- Rudder: spade-type rudder

Rig
- Rig type: Bermuda rig
- I foretriangle height: 55.75 ft (16.99 m)
- J foretriangle base: 18.58 ft (5.66 m)
- P mainsail luff: 52.16 ft (15.90 m)
- E mainsail foot: 18.67 ft (5.69 m)

Sails
- Sailplan: fractional rigged sloop
- Mainsail area: 486.91 sq ft (45.235 m^{2})
- Jib/genoa area: 517.92 sq ft (48.116 m^{2})
- Total sail area: 1,004.83 sq ft (93.352 m^{2})

Racing
- PHRF: 68-109

The Sun Odyssey 49 is a French sailboat that was designed by Philippe Briand as a cruiser and first built in 2003.

== Production ==
The design was built by Jeanneau in France, starting in 2003, but it is now out of production.

== Design ==
The Sun Odyssey 49 is a recreational keelboat, built predominantly of fiberglass. It has a fractional sloop rig, a slightly raked stem, a reverse transom with steps and a swimming platform, an internally mounted spade-type controlled by dual wheels and a fixed fin keel with a weighted bulb. It displaces 27,778 lb (12,600 kg) and carries 8,025 lb (3,640 kg) of ballast.

The boat has a draft of 7.75 ft (2.36 m) with the standard keel.

The boat was also built in a "performance" version for racing with a taller rig and modified keel.

The boat is fitted with a Japanese Yanmar diesel engine of 68 hp (51 kW) for docking and maneuvering. The fuel tank holds 63 U.S. gallons (240 L; 52 imp gal) and the fresh water tank has a capacity of 185 U.S. gallons (700 L; 154 imp gal).

The design has sleeping accommodation for six to eight people with three or four cabin layouts. In the three cabin layout there is a double berth in the bow cabin, whereas in the four cabin layout the bow holds two smaller cabins, each with a double berth. In either arrangement there are two aft cabins with double berths. The main salon has a U-shaped settee and a straight settee, around a rectangular table all on the starboard side. The galley is located on the port side amidships. The galley is straight in shape and is equipped with a four-burner stove, an ice box and a double sink. There are two, three or four heads fitted, depending on configuration. A navigation station may be located aft on the starboard side unless replaced by a fourth head.

The design has a hull speed of 8.72 kn (16.15 km/h) and a PHRF handicap of 68 to 109 for the shoal draft keel model.

== See also ==
- List of sailing boat types
