= Sun Fast 40 =

Sailboat class

Development
- Designer: Daniel Andrieu
- Location: France
- Year: 2003
- Builder: Jeanneau
- Role: Racer-Cruiser

Boat
- Displacement: 16,094 lb (7,300 kg)
- Draft: 6.33 ft (1.93 m)

Hull
- Type: monohull
- Construction: fiberglass
- LOA: 40.00 ft (12.19 m)
- LWL: 33.33 ft (10.16 m)
- Beam: 12.92 ft (3.94 m)
- Engine: 30 hp (22 kW) diesel engine

Hull appendages
- Keel: fin keel with weighted bulb
- Ballast: 5,291 lb (2,400 kg)
- Rudder: spade-type rudder

Rig
- Rig type: Bermuda rig
- I foretriangle height: 52.75 ft (16.08 m)
- J foretriangle base: 13.83 ft (4.22 m)
- P mainsail luff: 48.83 ft (14.88 m)
- E mainsail foot: 15.83 ft (4.82 m)

Sails
- Sailplan: fractional rigged sloop
- Mainsail area: 386.49 sq ft (35.906 m^{2})
- Jib/genoa area: 364.77 sq ft (33.888 m^{2})
- Spinnaker area: 1,162 sq ft (108.0 m^{2})
- Upwind sail area: 751.26 sq ft (69.794 m^{2})
- Downwind sail area: 1,548.49 sq ft (143.859 m^{2})

The Sun Fast 40 is a French sailboat that was designed by Daniel Andrieu as a racer-cruiser and first built in 2003.

== Production ==
The design was built by Jeanneau in France, starting in 2003, but it is now out of production.

== Design ==
The Sun Fast 40 is a recreational keelboat, built predominantly of fiberglass, with wood trim. It has a fractional sloop rig, with three sets of swept spreaders and aluminum spars with stainless steel wire rigging. The hull has a raked stem, a reverse transom with a swimming platform, an internally mounted spade-type rudder controlled by twin wheels and a fixed fin keel or optional deep-draft "performance" keel. The fin keel model displaces 16,094 lb (7,300 kg) and carries 5,291 lb (2,400 kg) of cast iron ballast, while the performance version displaces 16,535 lb (7,500 kg) and carries 5,776 lb (2,620 kg) of lead and iron ballast.

The boat has a draft of 6.33 ft (1.93 m) with the standard keel and 7.83 ft (2.39 m) with the optional deep-draft performance draft keel.

The boat is fitted with a 30 hp (22 kW) diesel engine for docking and maneuvering. The fuel tank holds 36 U.S. gallons (140 L; 30 imp gal) and the fresh water tank has a capacity of 85 U.S. gallons (320 L; 71 imp gal).

The design has sleeping accommodation for four or six people, with a double "V"-berth in the bow cabin, a U-shaped settee and two seats in the main cabin and an aft cabin with a double berth on the port side, or, optionally, two aft cabins, each with double berths. The galley is located on the starboard side at the companionway ladder. The galley is L-shaped and equipped with a two-burner stove, an ice box and a double sink. The head is located aft on the port side. An optional second head may be fitted in the bow cabin, on the starboard side.

The design has a hull speed of 7.74 kn (14.33 km/h).

For sailing downwind the design may be equipped with a symmetrical spinnaker of 1,162 sq ft (108.0 m^{2}).

== Operational history ==
The boat was at one time supported by a class club, the Sun Fast Association, that organized racing events.

A 2004 review by Boats.com reported, "Jeanneau makes its entry into the crowded 40' racer/cruiser fleet with the new Sun Fast 40. Jeanneau asked designer Daniel Andrieu to create a true multi-purpose boat, with speed potential to keep up with other 40' racer/cruisers, yet retain a comfortable interior for cruising and weekending. The Sun Fast line by Jeanneau accentuates the racer in racer/cruiser; their Sun Odyssey line is targeted specifically at the cruising market."

== See also ==
- List of sailing boat types
