= Sun 2500 =

Sailboat class

Development
- Designer: Olivier Petit
- Location: France
- Year: 2004
- Builder: Jeanneau
- Role: Cruiser
- Name: Sun 2500

Boat
- Displacement: 4,938 lb (2,240 kg)
- Draft: 5.74 ft (1.75 m) with centerboard down

Hull
- Type: monohull
- Construction: fiberglass
- LOA: 24.61 ft (7.50 m)
- LWL: 23.46 ft (7.15 m)
- Beam: 9.51 ft (2.90 m)
- Engine: inboard engine or outboard motor

Hull appendages
- Keel: stub keel and centerboard
- Ballast: 1,477 lb (670 kg)
- Rudder: dual spade rudders

Rig
- Rig type: Bermuda rig
- I foretriangle height: 29.92 ft (9.12 m)
- J foretriangle base: 9.68 ft (2.95 m)
- P mainsail luff: 30.18 ft (9.20 m)
- E mainsail foot: 9.51 ft (2.90 m)

Sails
- Sailplan: 9/10 fractional rigged sloop
- Mainsail area: 179 sq ft (16.6 m^{2})
- Jib/genoa area: 145 sq ft (13.5 m^{2})
- Spinnaker area: 388 sq ft (36.0 m^{2})
- Upwind sail area: 324 sq ft (30.1 m^{2})
- Downwind sail area: 566 sq ft (52.6 m^{2})

The Sun 2500 is a French sailboat that was designed by Olivier Petit as a cruiser and first built in 2004.

== Production ==
The design was built by Jeanneau in France, starting in 2004 and ending in 2008.

== Design ==
The Sun 2500 is a recreational sailboat, built predominantly of polyester fiberglass. The hull is made from solid fiberglass, while the deck is a balsa-fiberglass sandwich. It has a 9/10 fractional sloop rig, with a deck-stepped mast, a single set of swept spreaders and aluminum spars with continuous stainless steel wire rigging. The hull has a plumb stem and transom, dual spade rudders controlled by a tiller and a stub keel with a retractable centerboard or an optional fixed L-shaped keel. The fin keel model displaces 4,564 lb (2,070 kg) and carries 1,102 lb (500 kg) of ballast, while the centerboard version displaces 4,938 lb (2,240 kg) and carries 1,477 lb (670 kg) of ballast.

The keel-equipped version of the boat has a draft of 5 ft 2 in (1.57 m), while the centerboard-equipped version has a draft of 5 ft 8 in (1.73 m) with the centerboard extended and 2 ft 4 in (0.71 m) with it retracted, allowing operation in shallow water.

The boat is normally fitted with a small 9 hp (7 kW) outboard motor or optional Yanmar 1GM10 inboard engine for docking and maneuvering. The fuel tank holds 7 U.S. gallons (26 L; 5.8 imp gal) and the fresh water tank has a capacity of 15 U.S. gallons (57 L; 12 imp gal).

The design has sleeping accommodation for four people, with a double "V"-berth in the bow around a teardrop table and a double berth aft on the part side. The galley is located on the port side at the companionway ladder and is equipped with a single burner stove and a small sink. The enclosed head is located just aft of the companionway on the starboard side. Cabin headroom is 62 in (157 cm).

For sailing downwind the design included an optional asymmetrical gennaker flown from a short simple bowsprit 388 sq ft (36.0 m^{2}).

The design has a hull speed of 6.49 kn (12.02 km/h)

== See also ==
- List of sailing boat types
