= CAP 540 =

Sailboat class

Development
- Location: France
- Year: 1986
- Builder: Jeanneau
- Role: Day sailer-fishing boat

Boat
- Displacement: 1,499 lb (680 kg)
- Draft: 2.10 ft (0.64 m)

Hull
- Type: monohull
- Construction: fiberglass
- LOA: 17.72 ft (5.40 m)
- LWL: 16.40 ft (5.00 m)
- Beam: 7.71 ft (2.35 m)

Hull appendages
- Keel: long keel
- Rudder: transom-mounted rudder

Rig
- Rig type: Bermuda rig

Sails
- Sailplan: fractional rigged sloop

The CAP 540 is a French trailerable sailboat as a day sailer and fishing vessel. It was first built in 1986.

== Production ==
The design was built by Jeanneau in France, starting in 1986, but it is now out of production.

== Design ==
The CAP 540 is a recreational keelboat, built predominantly of fiberglass, with wood trim. It has a fractional sloop rig. The hull has a raked stem, a slightly angled transom, a transom-hung rudder controlled by a tiller and a fixed long keel. It displaces 1,499 lb (680 kg).

The boat has a draft of 2.10 ft (0.64 m) with the standard long keel.

The design has a hull speed of 5.43 kn (10.06 km/h).

== See also ==
- List of sailing boat types
