= Sun Fast 52 =

Sailboat class

Development
- Designer: Philippe Briand
- Location: France
- Year: 1992
- No. built: 20
- Builder: Jeanneau
- Role: Racer-Cruiser
- Name: Sun Fast 52

Boat
- Displacement: 28,660 lb (13,000 kg)
- Draft: 8.04 ft (2.45 m)

Hull
- Type: monohull
- Construction: fiberglass
- LOA: 51.05 ft (15.56 m)
- LWL: 44.29 ft (13.50 m)
- Beam: 14.50 ft (4.42 m)
- Engine: 80 hp (60 kW) diesel engine

Hull appendages
- Keel: fin keel
- Ballast: 11,078 lb (5,025 kg)
- Rudder: spade-type rudder

Rig
- Rig type: Bermuda rig
- I foretriangle height: 64.53 ft (19.67 m)
- J foretriangle base: 17.85 ft (5.44 m)
- P mainsail luff: 56.76 ft (17.30 m)
- E mainsail foot: 21.16 ft (6.45 m)

Sails
- Sailplan: masthead sloop
- Mainsail area: 600.52 sq ft (55.790 m^{2})
- Jib/genoa area: 575.93 sq ft (53.506 m^{2})
- Total sail area: 1,176.45 sq ft (109.296 m^{2})

Racing
- PHRF: 57

The Sun Fast 52 is a French sailboat that was designed by Philippe Briand as a racer-cruiser and first built in 1992.

== Production ==
The design was built by Jeanneau in France, from 1994 until 1994, with 20 boats completed, but it is now out of production.

== Design ==
The Sun Fast 52 is a recreational keelboat, built predominantly of fiberglass, with wood trim. It has a masthead sloop rig, a raked stem, a reverse transom with steps to a swimming platform, an internally mounted spade-type rudder controlled by a wheel and a fixed fin keel or optional shoal-draft keel. It displaces 28,660 lb (13,000 kg) and carries 11,078 lb (5,025 kg) of ballast.

The boat has a draft of 8.04 ft (2.45 m) with the standard keel and 5.25 ft (1.60 m) with the optional shoal draft keel.

The boat is fitted with a diesel engine of 80 hp (60 kW) for docking and maneuvering. The fuel tank holds 53 U.S. gallons (200 L; 44 imp gal) and the fresh water tank has a capacity of 140 U.S. gallons (530 L; 120 imp gal).

The design has sleeping accommodation for six people, with either a double berth in the forward cabin, or two forward cabins with single berths in each. There are two aft cabin with double berths under the cockpit. The salon has an L-shaped settee and a straight settee around a table. The galley is located on the starboard side amidships. The galley is straight in configuration and is equipped with a four-burner stove, a refrigerator and freezer and dual sinks. A navigation station is aft of the galley, on the starboard side. There are two heads, one in the bow and one on the port side aft.

The design has a hull speed of 8.92 kn (16.52 km/h) and a PHRF handicap of 57.

== Operational history ==
The boat was at one time supported by a class club that organized racing events, the Sun Fast Association.

== See also ==
- List of sailing boat types
