= Voyage 11.2 =

Sailboat class

Development
- Designer: Guy Ribadeau Dumas
- Location: France
- Year: 1988
- Builder: Jeanneau
- Role: Cruiser

Boat
- Displacement: 11,023 lb (5,000 kg)
- Draft: 5.09 ft (1.55 m)

Hull
- Type: monohull
- Construction: fiberglass
- LOA: 36.74 ft (11.20 m)
- LWL: 29.46 ft (8.98 m)
- Beam: 11.97 ft (3.65 m)
- Engine: Yanmar 4GH2E diesel engine

Hull appendages
- Keel: fin keel
- Rudder: skeg-mounted rudder

Rig
- Rig type: Bermuda rig

Sails
- Sailplan: masthead sloop
- Total sail area: 559.00 sq ft (51.933 m^{2})

Racing
- PHRF: 129-159

The Voyage 11.2, or Voyage 11.20, is a French sailboat. It was first built in 1988 and was designed by Guy Ribadeau Dumas as a cruiser.

The design's designation is its metric length overall of 11.20 metres (36.7 feet).

== Production ==
Starting in 1988, the design was built by Jeanneau in France. It is now out of production.

== Design ==
The Voyage 11.2 is a recreational keelboat, built predominantly of fiberglass, with wood trim and a masthead sloop rig. The hull has a raked stem, a reverse transom with steps to a swim platform, a skeg-mounted rudder controlled by a wheel and a fixed fin keel. It displaces 11,023 lb (5,000 kg).

The boat has a draft of 5.09 ft (1.55 m) with the standard keel.

The boat is fitted with a Japanese Yanmar 4GH2E diesel engine for docking and maneuvering. The fuel tank holds 30 U.S. gallons (110 L; 25 imp gal) and the fresh water tank has a capacity of 92 U.S. gallons (350 L; 77 imp gal).

The design has sleeping accommodation for six people, with a double "V"-berth in the bow cabin and two aft cabins, each with a double berth. The galley is located on the starboard side, amidships and opposite the U-shaped settee around the oval table. The galley is equipped with a three-burner stove, an ice box and a double sink. A navigation station is on the starboard side, aft of the galley. The head is located just forward of the aft port cabin. Each cabin also has its own sink.

The design has a hull speed of 7.27 kn (13.46 km/h) and a PHRF handicap range of 129-159.

== See also ==
- List of sailing boat types
