= Espace 1000 =

French sailboat class

Development
- Designer: Philippe Briand
- Location: France
- Year: 1980
- No. built: 228
- Builder: Jeanneau
- Role: Cruiser
- Name: Espace 1000

Boat
- Displacement: 12,787 lb (5,800 kg)
- Draft: 7.32 ft (2.23 m) with centerboard down

Hull
- Type: monohull
- Construction: fiberglass
- LOA: 34.94 ft (10.65 m)
- LWL: 28.87 ft (8.80 m)
- Beam: 11.97 ft (3.65 m)
- Engine: inboard engine

Hull appendages
- Keel: stub keel and centerboard
- Ballast: 4,564 lb (2,070 kg)
- Rudder: spade-type rudder

Rig
- Rig type: Bermuda rig
- I foretriangle height: 43.30 ft (13.20 m)
- J foretriangle base: 12.50 ft (3.81 m)
- P mainsail luff: 37.20 ft (11.34 m)
- E mainsail foot: 11.50 ft (3.51 m)

Sails
- Sailplan: masthead sloop
- Mainsail area: 213.90 sq ft (19.872 m^{2})
- Jib/genoa area: 270.63 sq ft (25.142 m^{2})
- Total sail area: 484.53 sq ft (45.014 m^{2})

The Espace 1000 (English: Space) is a French sailboat that was designed by Philippe Briand as a cruiser and first built in 1980.

The design was the first of the line of six Espace series boats of varying sizes that Jeanneau built in the 1980s. Its designation indicates its approximate length overall in centimeters.

== Production ==
The design was built by Jeanneau in France, from 1980 to 1987, with 228 boats completed, but it is now out of production.

== Design ==
The Espace 1000 is a recreational keelboat, built predominantly of fiberglass, with wood trim. It has an enclosed wheelhouse, a masthead sloop rig, with a single set of spreaders and aluminum spars with stainless steel wire rigging. The hull has a raked stem, a reverse transom, an internally mounted spade-type rudder controlled by a wheel in the cockpit and another in the wheelhouse. It has a stub keel and retractable centerboard or optional fixed fin keel. The centerboard version displaces 12,787 lb (5,800 kg) and carries 4,564 lb (2,070 kg) of ballast, while the fixed keel model displaces 12,985 lb (5,890 kg).

The keel-equipped version of the boat has a draft of 5.41 ft (1.65 m), while the centerboard-equipped version has a draft of 7.32 ft (2.23 m) with the centerboard extended and 4.00 ft (1.22 m) with it retracted, allowing operation in shallow water or ground transportation on a trailer.

The boat is fitted with an inboard engine for docking and maneuvering. The fuel tank holds 53 U.S. gallons (200 L; 44 imp gal) and the fresh water tank has a capacity of 66 U.S. gallons (250 L; 55 imp gal).

The design has sleeping accommodation for seven people, with a double "V"-berth in the bow cabin, an L-shaped settee and a straight settee in the main cabin and an aft cabin with a double berth. The galley is located on the starboard side just forward of the companionway ladder. The galley is equipped with a two-burner stove, ice box and a double sink. A navigation station is opposite the galley in the wheelhouse, on the boat's centerline. The head is located just aft of the bow cabin on the port side and includes a shower.

For sailing downwind the design may be equipped with a symmetrical spinnaker.

The design has a hull speed of 7.2 kn (13.3 km/h).

== See also ==
- List of sailing boat types
