= Sun Fast 40.3 =

Sailboat class

Development
- Designer: Daniel Andrieu
- Location: France
- Year: 2004
- Builder: Jeanneau
- Role: Cruiser-Racer
- Name: Sun Fast 40.3

Boat
- Displacement: 18,056 lb (8,190 kg)
- Draft: 6.89 ft (2.10 m)

Hull
- Type: monohull
- Construction: fiberglass
- LOA: 40.03 ft (12.20 m)
- LWL: 33.37 ft (10.17 m)
- Beam: 12.96 ft (3.95 m)
- Engine: Yanmar 56 hp (42 kW) diesel engine

Hull appendages
- Keel: fin keel with weighted bulb
- Ballast: 5,291 lb (2,400 kg)
- Rudder: spade-type rudder

Rig
- Rig type: Bermuda rig
- I foretriangle height: 50.95 ft (15.53 m)
- J foretriangle base: 13.84 ft (4.22 m)
- P mainsail luff: 46.59 ft (14.20 m)
- E mainsail foot: 16.73 ft (5.10 m)

Sails
- Sailplan: fractional rigged sloop
- Mainsail area: 389.73 sq ft (36.207 m^{2})
- Jib/genoa area: 352.57 sq ft (32.755 m^{2})
- Total sail area: 742.30 sq ft (68.962 m^{2})

The Sun Fast 40.3 is a French sailboat that was designed by Daniel Andrieu as a cruiser-racer and was first built in 2004.

== Production ==
The design was built by Jeanneau in France, starting in 2004, but it is now out of production.

== Design ==
The Sun Fast 40.3 is a recreational keelboat, built predominantly of fiberglass, with wood trim. It has a fractional sloop rig, a raked stem, a reverse transom with a swimming platform, an internally mounted spade-type rudder controlled by dual wheels and a fixed fin keel with a weighted bulb. It displaces 18,056 lb (8,190 kg) and carries 5,291 lb (2,400 kg) of ballast.

The boat has a draft of 6.89 ft (2.10 m) with the standard keel.

The boat is fitted with a Japanese Yanmar diesel engine of 56 hp (42 kW) for docking and maneuvering. The fuel tank holds 36 U.S. gallons (140 L; 30 imp gal) and the fresh water tank has a capacity of 90 U.S. gallons (340 L; 75 imp gal).

The design has sleeping accommodation for four to six people in two and three-cabin interior configurations. The two cabin interior has a double berth in the bow cabin, a U-shaped settee and a two straight settees in the main cabin and an aft cabin with a double berth on the starboard side. The three-cabin version splits the aft cabin into two cabins, each with a double berth. The galley is located on the starboard side, just forward of the companionway ladder. The galley is L-shaped and is equipped with a two-burner stove, an ice box and a double sink. A navigation station is opposite the galley, on the port side. The design may be fitted with a single head, located aft on the port side. A second head may be fitted in the bow cabin on the starboard side.

For sailing downwind the design may be equipped with a symmetrical spinnaker. The design has a hull speed of 7.74 kn (14.33 km/h).

== Operational history ==
The boat was at one time supported by a class club that organized racing events, the Sun Fast Association.

== See also ==
- List of sailing boat types
