= Sun Odyssey 34.2 =

Sailboat class

Development
- Designer: Jacques Fauroux
- Location: France
- Year: 1989
- Builder: Jeanneau
- Role: Cruiser
- Name: Sun Odyssey 34.2

Boat
- Displacement: 10,253 lb (4,651 kg)
- Draft: 5.58 ft (1.70 m)

Hull
- Type: monohull
- Construction: fiberglass
- LOA: 33.75 ft (10.29 m)
- LWL: 29.50 ft (8.99 m)
- Beam: 10.75 ft (3.28 m)
- Engine: Volvo diesel engine

Hull appendages
- Keel: fin keel, with weighted bulb
- Ballast: 3,351 lb (1,520 kg)
- Rudder: spade-type rudder

Rig
- Rig type: Bermuda rig
- I foretriangle height: 41.66 ft (12.70 m)
- J foretriangle base: 11.00 ft (3.35 m)
- P mainsail luff: 35.43 ft (10.80 m)
- E mainsail foot: 13.78 ft (4.20 m)

Sails
- Sailplan: masthead sloop
- Mainsail area: 244.11 sq ft (22.679 m^{2})
- Jib/genoa area: 229.13 sq ft (21.287 m^{2})
- Total sail area: 473.24 sq ft (43.965 m^{2})

Racing
- PHRF: 120-156

The Sun Odyssey 34.2, also called the Jeanneau 34.2, is a French sailboat that was designed by Jacques Fauroux as a cruiser and first built in 1998.

The boat was also sold as the two-cabin Stardust 342 and three cabin Stardust 343 for use in the yacht charter role and was widely employed in Europe, including in the Mediterranean Sea and the Aegean Sea.

== Production ==
The design was built by Jeanneau in France, starting in 1998 and sold as the Sun Odyssey 34.2 for the European private market and with custom interiors, as the Stardust 342 and Stardust 343 for yacht charter operators. Starting in 1999 it was sold in the US market as the Jeanneau 34.2. It is now out of production.

== Design ==
The Sun Odyssey 34.2 is a recreational keelboat, built predominantly of fiberglass, with wood trim. It has a masthead sloop rig a raked stem, a reverse transom with a swimming platform, an internally mounted spade-type rudder controlled by a wheel and a fixed fin keel or optional shoal-draft keel. It displaces 10,253 lb (4,651 kg) and carries 3,351 lb (1,520 kg) of ballast.

The boat has a draft of 5.58 ft (1.70 m) with the standard keel and 4.25 ft (1.30 m) with the optional shoal draft keel. The US and charter versions have a draft of 6.00 ft (1.83 m).

The boat is fitted with a Swedish Volvo or Japanese Yanmar diesel engine of 27 hp (20 kW) for docking and maneuvering. The fuel tank holds 28 U.S. gallons (110 L; 23 imp gal) and the fresh water tank has a capacity of 37 U.S. gallons (140 L; 31 imp gal).

In the three cabin interior, the design has sleeping accommodation for six people, with a double "V"-berth in the bow cabin, a U-shaped settee in the main cabin and two aft cabins with a double berth in each. The galley is located on the port side, amidships and is equipped with a two-burner stove, an ice box and a double sink. A navigation station is opposite the galley, on the starboard side, aft. The head is located on the port side at the companionway ladder. The two cabin version has a single aft cabin and also a separate shower cabinet.

The design has a hull speed of 7.28 kn (13.48 km/h) and a PHRF handicap of 120 to 156.

== See also ==
- List of sailing boat types
