= Sun Fast 36 =

Sailboat class

Development
- Designer: Philippe Briand
- Location: France
- Year: 1994
- Builder: Jeanneau
- Role: Cruiser-Racer

Boat
- Displacement: 13,669 lb (6,200 kg)
- Draft: 6.43 ft (1.96 m)

Hull
- Type: monohull
- Construction: fiberglass
- LOA: 37.11 ft (11.31 m)
- LWL: 31.50 ft (9.60 m)
- Beam: 11.45 ft (3.49 m)
- Engine: Yanmar 3GM30 27 hp (20 kW) diesel engine

Hull appendages
- Keel: fin keel
- Ballast: 4,630 lb (2,100 kg)
- Rudder: spade-type rudder

Rig
- Rig type: Bermuda rig
- I foretriangle height: 44.62 ft (13.60 m)
- J foretriangle base: 12.47 ft (3.80 m)
- P mainsail luff: 44.62 ft (13.60 m)
- E mainsail foot: 15.12 ft (4.61 m)

Sails
- Sailplan: fractional rigged sloop
- Mainsail area: 337.33 sq ft (31.339 m^{2})
- Jib/genoa area: 278.21 sq ft (25.847 m^{2})
- Total sail area: 615.53 sq ft (57.185 m^{2})

Racing
- PHRF: 90-96

The Sun Fast 36 is a French sailboat that was designed by Philippe Briand as a cruiser-racer and first built in 1994.

== Production ==
The design was built by Jeanneau in France, starting in 1994, but she is now out of production.

== Design ==
The Sun Fast 36 is a recreational keelboat, built predominantly of fiberglass, with wood trim. She has a fractional sloop rig, with two sets of swept spreaders and aluminum spars with stainless steel wire rigging. The hull has a nearly plumb stem, a reverse transom with steps, an internally mounted spade-type rudder controlled by a tiller and a fixed fin keel, deep draft keel or optional shoal-draft keel. She displaces 13,669 lb (6,200 kg) and carries 4,630 lb (2,100 kg) of ballast.

The boat has a draft of 6.43 ft (1.96 m) with the standard cast iron keel with a weighted bulb, 6.67 ft (2.03 m) with the deep draft lead keel and 4.92 ft (1.50 m) with the optional shoal draft cast iron keel.

The boat is fitted with a Japanese Yanmar 3GM30 diesel engine of 27 hp (20 kW) for docking and maneuvering. A 33 hp (25 kW) engine was optional. The fuel tank holds 24 U.S. gallons (91 L; 20 imp gal) and the fresh water tank has a capacity of 74 U.S. gallons (280 L; 62 imp gal).

The design has sleeping accommodation for six to eight people with two different interior layouts. The two cabin interior has a double "V"-berth in the bow cabin, an U-shaped settee and a straight settee in the main cabin and an aft cabin with a double berth on the port side. The three cabin version adds a second aft cabin on the starboard side. The galley is located on the port side just forward of the companionway ladder. The galley is L-shaped and is equipped with a two-burner stove, an ice box and a double sink. A navigation station is opposite the galley, on the starboard side. The head is located opposite the galley on the starboard side. On the three cabin model it is located slightly further forward.

The design has a hull speed of 7.52 kn (13.93 km/h) and a PHRF handicap of 90 to 96.

== Operational history ==
The boat was at one time supported by a class club that organized racing events, the Sun Fast Association.

== See also ==
- List of sailing boat types
