= Sun Odyssey 47 =

Sailboat class

Development
- Designer: Philippe Briand
- Location: France
- Year: 1991
- No. built: 40
- Builder: Jeanneau
- Role: Cruiser

Boat
- Displacement: 26,455 lb (12,000 kg)
- Draft: 6.89 ft (2.10 m)

Hull
- Type: monohull
- Construction: fiberglass
- LOA: 47.24 ft (14.40 m)
- LWL: 38.39 ft (11.70 m)
- Beam: 14.60 ft (4.45 m)
- Engine: diesel engine

Hull appendages
- Keel: fin keel with weighted bulb
- Ballast: 9,700 lb (4,400 kg)
- Rudder: spade-type rudder

Rig
- Rig type: Bermuda rig

Sails
- Sailplan: masthead sloop
- Total sail area: 1,205.56 sq ft (112.000 m^{2})

Racing
- PHRF: 66-69

The Sun Odyssey 47 is a series of French sailboats that was designed by Philippe Briand as a cruiser and first built in 1991. It was produced as the aft cockpit Sun Odyssey 47 and the center cockpit Sun Odyssey 47 CC.

== Production ==
The design was built by Jeanneau in France, starting in 1991, but it is now out of production.

== Design ==
The Sun Odyssey 47 series are recreational keelboats, built predominantly of Kevlar-reinforced fiberglass, with wood trim. They have masthead sloop rigs, raked stems, reverse transoms with steps and a swimming platform, internally mounted spade-type rudders controlled by a wheel and a fixed fin keels with weighted bulbs.

The CC model was built in both two and three cabin interior arrangements. The two cabin version has sleeping accommodation for four people, with a double "V"-berth in the bow cabin, a U-shaped settee and additional seating in the main cabin and an aft cabin with a central double berth. The three cabin model adds a single berth in a small cabin on the starboard side of the bow. The galley is located on the starboard side just aft of the companionway ladder. The galley is straight in configuration and is equipped with a four-burner stove, an ice box and a double sink. A navigation station is opposite the galley, on the port side. There are two heads, one just aft of the bow cabin on the port side and one on the port side in the aft cabin.

The design has a hull speed of 8.3 kn (15.4 km/h) and a PHRF handicap of 66 to 69.

== Variants ==
Sun Odyssey 47
This aft cockpit model has a length overall of 47.24 ft (14.4 m), hull length of 45.92 ft (14.0 m), a waterline length of 38.39 ft (11.7 m), displaces 25,455 lb (11,546 kg) and carries 9,700 lb (4,400 kg) of ballast. The boat has a draft of 6.89 ft (2.10 m) with the standard keel. The boat is fitted with a diesel engine. The fuel tank holds 55 U.S. gallons (210 L; 46 imp gal) and the fresh water tank has a capacity of 153 U.S. gallons (580 L; 127 imp gal). A total of 40 boats of this model were produced.
Sun Odyssey 47 CC
This center cockpit model has a length overall of 47.24 ft (14.4 m), a waterline length of 38.39 ft (11.7 m), displaces 27,558 lb (12,500 kg) and carries 9,766 lb (4,430 kg) of ballast. The boat has a draft of 6.89 ft (2.10 m) with the standard keel. The boat is fitted with a 60 hp (45 kW) diesel engine. The fuel tank holds 62 U.S. gallons (230 L; 52 imp gal) and the fresh water tank has a capacity of 188 U.S. gallons (710 L; 157 imp gal).

== Operational history ==
In a 1993 Cruising World review of the Sun Odyssey 47, Hal Sutphen wrote, "with a strong, Kevlar-reinforced fiberglass hull and robust rig atop a sleek, modern underbody, the Jeanneau Sun Odyssey 47 has all the earmarks of a swift offshore passage maker. Its Displacement/Length ratio of 208 suggests it will be quick, and its Sail Area/Displacement ratio of 17.3 suggests adequate propulsion power to perform respectably over a wide range of wind speeds."

In a 1996 review of the Sun Odyssey 47 CC in Cruising World Quentin Warren wrote, "the 47 is compromised under sail by many of the elements that make it so appealing from a habitable and user-friendly point of view. A roachless main flown off a furling spar is easy to deploy, but difficult to trim or shape; a lapping genoa loses its efficiency when you begin to roll it up to shorten sail. A big, fixed three-bladed prop enhances motoring but represents considerable drag when the engine isn't being used. Hydraulic steering allows you to position a helm station well forward, but you lose a lot of the feel of the boat on the breeze. Suffice it to say, our test sail on the boat left us wishing for more horsepower and efficiency in the sail plan and greater responsiveness at the helm. By contrast the 47's precursor — an aft-cockpit model with the same Briand hull — certainly proved itself unconditionally".

== See also ==
- List of sailing boat types
