= Espace 620 =

Sailboat class

Development
- Designer: Jeanneau Design Office
- Location: France
- Year: 1983
- No. built: 30
- Builder: Jeanneau
- Role: Cruiser
- Name: Espace 620

Boat
- Displacement: 2,646 lb (1,200 kg)
- Draft: 3.61 ft (1.10 m)

Hull
- Type: monohull
- Construction: fiberglass
- LOA: 20.34 ft (6.20 m)
- LWL: 17.81 ft (5.43 m)
- Beam: 8.20 ft (2.50 m)
- Engine: inboard engine or outboard motor

Hull appendages
- Keel: fin keel
- Ballast: 992 lb (450 kg)
- Rudder: transom-mounted rudder

Rig
- Rig type: Bermuda rig
- I foretriangle height: 28.80 ft (8.78 m)
- J foretriangle base: 8.70 ft (2.65 m)
- P mainsail luff: 23.30 ft (7.10 m)
- E mainsail foot: 9.20 ft (2.80 m)

Sails
- Sailplan: masthead sloop
- Mainsail area: 107.18 sq ft (9.957 m^{2})
- Jib/genoa area: 125.28 sq ft (11.639 m^{2})
- Total sail area: 232.46 sq ft (21.596 m^{2})

The Espace 620 (English: Space) is a French trailerable sailboat that was designed by the Jeanneau Design Office as a cruiser and first built in 1983. The boat is part of the Espace series of cruising sailboats and its designation indicates its length overall in centimeters.

== Production ==
The design was built by Jeanneau in France, from 1983 until 1986 with 30 boats completed, but it is now out of production.

== Design ==
The Espace 620 is a recreational keelboat, built predominantly of fiberglass. It has a masthead sloop rig with aluminum spars and stainless steel wire rigging. The hull has a raked stem, a plumb transom, a transom-hung rudder controlled by a tiller and a fixed fin keel or optional twin keels or stub keel and retractable centerboard. It displaces 2,646 lb (1,200 kg) and carries 992 lb (450 kg) of ballast.

The boat has a draft of 3.61 ft (1.10 m) when fitted with the standard fin keel.

The boat may be optionally fitted with an inboard engine or a small outboard motor for docking and maneuvering.

The design has sleeping accommodation for four people, with a double "V"-berth in the bow cabin and a drop-down double dinette. The galley is located on the starboard side just forward of the companionway ladder. The galley is equipped with a two-burner stove and a sink. The enclosed head is located just aft of the bow cabin on the starboard side. The fresh water tank has a capacity of 7 U.S. gallons (26 L; 5.8 imp gal).

For sailing downwind the design may be equipped with a symmetrical spinnaker.

The design has a hull speed of 5.66 kn (10.48 km/h).

== See also ==
- List of sailing boat types
