= Fantasia 37 =

Sailboat class

Development
- Designer: Philippe Harlé
- Location: France
- Year: 1984
- Builder: Jeanneau
- Role: Cruiser
- Name: Fantasia 37

Boat
- Displacement: 16,775 lb (7,609 kg)
- Draft: 5.80 ft (1.77 m)

Hull
- Type: monohull
- Construction: fiberglass
- LOA: 36.58 ft (11.15 m)
- LWL: 29.83 ft (9.09 m)
- Beam: 11.19 ft (3.41 m)
- Engine: inboard engine

Hull appendages
- Keel: fin keel
- Ballast: 8,818 lb (4,000 kg)
- Rudder: spade-type rudder

Rig
- Rig type: Bermuda rig
- I foretriangle height: 46.00 ft (14.02 m)
- J foretriangle base: 14.80 ft (4.51 m)
- P mainsail luff: 40.50 ft (12.34 m)
- E mainsail foot: 14.50 ft (4.42 m)

Sails
- Sailplan: masthead sloop
- Mainsail area: 293.63 sq ft (27.279 m^{2})
- Jib/genoa area: 340.40 sq ft (31.624 m^{2})
- Total sail area: 634.03 sq ft (58.903 m^{2})

The Fantasia 37 is a French sailboat that was designed by Philippe Harlé as a cruiser and first built in 1984.

== Production ==
The design was built by Jeanneau in France, starting in 1984, but it is now out of production.

== Design ==
The Fantasia 37 is a recreational keelboat, built predominantly of fiberglass, with wood trim. It has a masthead sloop rig, displaces 16,755 lb (7,600 kg) and carries 8,818 lb (4,000 kg) of ballast. It has a draft of 5.80 ft (1.77 m) with the standard keel.

The design has a hull speed of 7.32 kn (13.56 km/h)

== See also ==
- List of sailing boat types
