= Sun Odyssey 45 DS =

Sailboat class

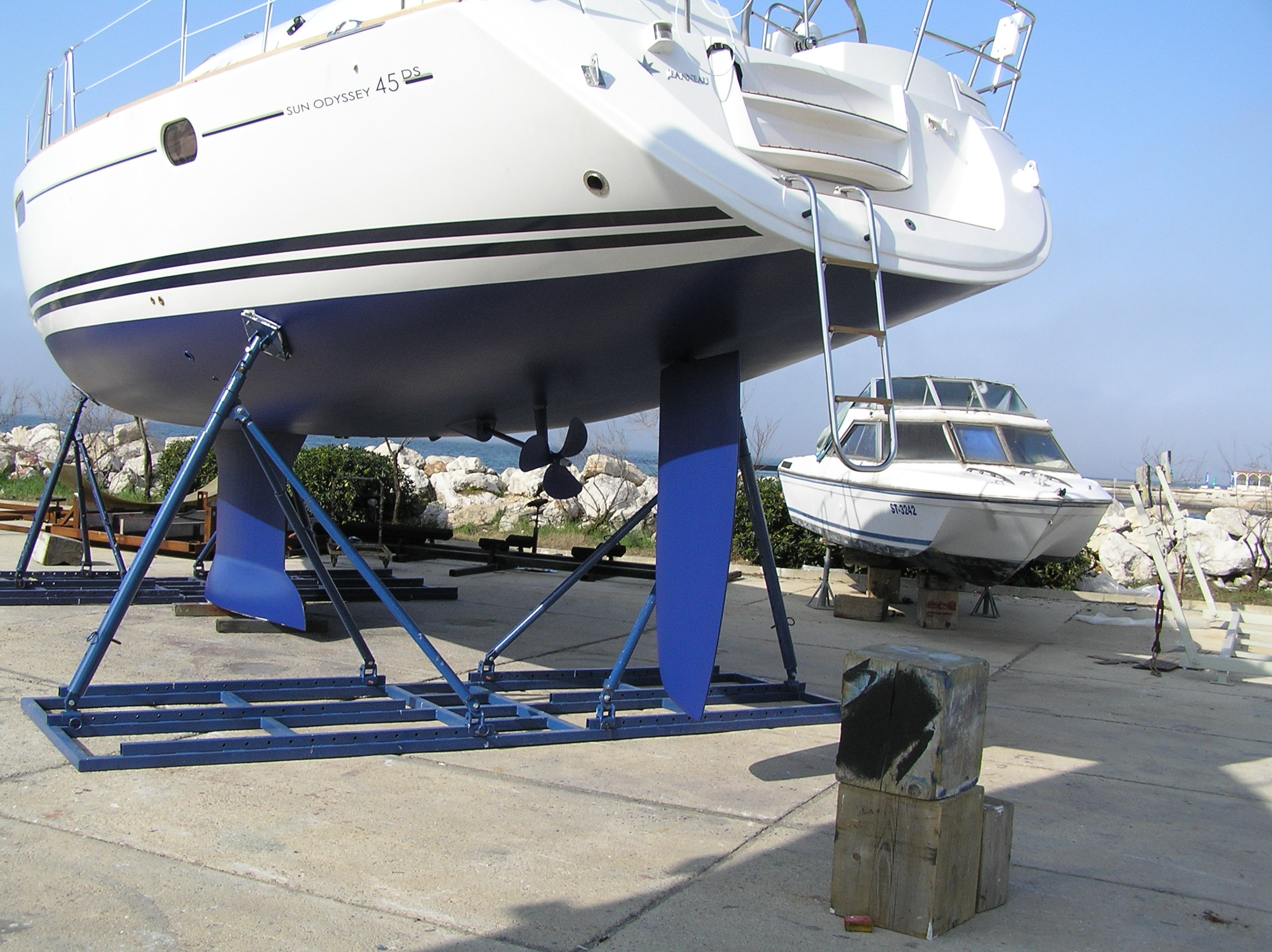
- Sun Odyssey 45 DS showing transom, keel and rudder configuration

Development
- Designer: Philippe Briand
- Location: France
- Year: 2007
- Builder: Jeanneau
- Role: Cruiser
- Name: Sun Odyssey 45 DS

Boat
- Displacement: 21,826 lb (9,900 kg)
- Draft: 6.73 ft (2.05 m)

Hull
- Type: monohull
- Construction: fiberglass
- LOA: 45.11 ft (13.75 m)
- LWL: 37.57 ft (11.45 m)
- Beam: 14.34 ft (4.37 m)
- Engine: Yanmar 54 hp (40 kW) diesel engine

Hull appendages
- Keel: fin keel, with weighted bulb
- Ballast: 6,512 lb (2,954 kg)
- Rudder: spade-type rudder

Rig
- Rig type: Bermuda rig
- I foretriangle height: 54.26 ft (16.54 m)
- J foretriangle base: 15.26 ft (4.65 m)
- P mainsail luff: 50.10 ft (15.27 m)
- E mainsail foot: 17.39 ft (5.30 m)

Sails
- Sailplan: fractional rigged sloop
- Mainsail area: 512.36 sq ft (47.600 m^{2})
- Jib/genoa area: 559.72 sq ft (52.000 m^{2})
- Spinnaker area: 1,291.67 sq ft (120.000 m^{2})
- Upwind sail area: 1,072.08 sq ft (99.599 m^{2})
- Downwind sail area: 1,804.03 sq ft (167.600 m^{2})

The Sun Odyssey 45 DS (Deck Saloon) is a French sailboat that was designed by Philippe Briand as a blue water cruiser and first built in 2007.

== Production ==
The design was built by Jeanneau in France, starting in 2007, but it is now out of production.

== Design ==
The Sun Odyssey 45 DS is a recreational keelboat, built predominantly of fiberglass. It has a 9/10 fractional sloop rig, a nearly plumb stem, a reverse transom with steps and a swimming platform, an internally mounted spade-type rudder controlled by dual wheels and a fixed deep draft fin keel with a weighted bulb or optional shoal-draft keel. The deep draft fin keel model displaces 21,826 lb (9,900 kg) and carries 6,512 lb (2,954 kg) of ballast, while the shoal draft version displaces 22,250 lb (10,092 kg) and carries 6,967 lb (3,160 kg) of ballast.

The boat has a draft of 6.73 ft (2.05 m) with the standard keel and 5.42 ft (1.65 m) with the optional shoal draft keel.

The boat is fitted with a British Perkins Engines 4-107 Japanese Yanmar diesel engine of 54 hp (40 kW) for docking and maneuvering. The fuel tank holds 63 U.S. gallons (240 L; 52 imp gal) and the fresh water tank has a capacity of 162 U.S. gallons (610 L; 135 imp gal).

The design has sleeping accommodation for six people, with a double "V"-berth in the bow cabin, a U-shaped settee and a straight settee in the main cabin and two aft cabins, each with a double berth. The galley is located on the starboard side at the companionway ladder. The galley is L-shaped and is equipped with a four-burner stove, an ice box and a double sink. A navigation station is opposite the galley, on the port side. There are two heads, one in the bow cabin on the starboard side and one on the port, aft. A two cabin interior was a factory option with the two aft cabins combined into one larger cabin.

For sailing downwind the design may be equipped with a symmetrical spinnaker of 1,291.67 sq ft (120.000 m^{2}).

The design has a hull speed of 8.21 kn (15.20 km/h).

== Operational history ==
In a 2015 review for Yachting Monthly, Theo Stocker wrote, "in light conditions and off the wind she handles like a much smaller boat than she is. She is a high-volume cruiser with ample space to live aboard, but this entails some sacrifice in her handling of stronger wind. Weight has been kept down to keep her light and responsive and her good form stability compensates for this, but with a ballast displacement ratio of just under 30 per cent, she can be tender once a blow gets up. This isn't a problem as long as you reef early and sail her reasonably flat."

== See also ==
- List of sailing boat types
