= Sun Fast 26 =

Sailboat class

Development
- Designer: Philippe Briand; Jeanneau Design Office
- Location: France
- Year: 1998
- Builder: Jeanneau
- Role: Cruiser-Racer
- Name: Sun Fast 26

Boat
- Displacement: 5,732 lb (2,600 kg)
- Draft: 4.92 ft (1.50 m)

Hull
- Type: monohull
- Construction: fiberglass
- LOA: 24.50 ft (7.47 m)
- LWL: 22.17 ft (6.76 m)
- Beam: 9.67 ft (2.95 m)
- Engine: 10 hp (7 kW) diesel engine

Hull appendages
- Keel: fin keel with weighted bulb
- Ballast: 1,984 lb (900 kg)
- Rudder: twin spade-type rudders

Rig
- Rig type: Bermuda rig
- I foretriangle height: 29.33 ft (8.94 m)
- J foretriangle base: 8.08 ft (2.46 m)
- P mainsail luff: 30.33 ft (9.24 m)
- E mainsail foot: 11.42 ft (3.48 m)

Sails
- Sailplan: fractional rigged sloop
- Mainsail area: 239 sq ft (22.2 m^{2})
- Jib/genoa area: 141 sq ft (13.1 m^{2})
- Spinnaker area: 414 sq ft (38.5 m^{2})
- Upwind sail area: 380 sq ft (35 m^{2})
- Downwind sail area: 653 sq ft (60.7 m^{2})

The Sun Fast 26 is a French sailboat that was designed by Philippe Briand and the Jeanneau Design Office as a cruiser-racer and first built in 1998.

The Sun Fast 26 is part of the Sun Fast sailboat range.

== Production ==
The design was built by Jeanneau in France, from 1998 to 2003, but it is now out of production.

== Design ==
The Sun Fast 26 is a recreational keelboat, built predominantly of polyester fiberglass, with wood trim. It has a fractional sloop rig, with a deck-stepped mast, a single set of swept spreaders and aluminum spars with continuous stainless steel wire rigging. The hull has a plumb stem, a reverse transom with a swimming platform, twin spade-type rudders controlled by a tiller and a fixed fin keel, with a weighted bulb. It displaces 5,732 lb (2,600 kg) and carries 1,984 lb (900 kg) of cast iron ballast.

The boat has a draft of 4.92 ft (1.50 m) with the standard keel.

The boat is fitted with a diesel engine of 10 hp (7 kW) for docking and maneuvering. The fuel tank holds 6.6 U.S. gallons (25 L; 5.5 imp gal) and the fresh water tank has a capacity of 26.4 U.S. gallons (100 L; 22.0 imp gal).

The design has sleeping accommodation for four people, with a double "V"-berth in the bow cabin around a table and an aft cabin with a centered double berth. The galley is located on the starboard side just forward of the companionway ladder. The galley is L-shaped and is equipped with a two-burner stove, an ice box and a sink. The head is located aft on the port side. Cabin maximum headroom is 72 in (183 cm).

For sailing downwind the design may be equipped with an asymmetrical spinnaker of 414 sq ft (38.5 m^{2}), flown from a retractable bowsprit.

The design has a hull speed of 6.32 kn (11.70 km/h).

== Operational history ==
The boat was at one time supported by a class club that organized racing events, the Sun Fast Association.

== See also ==
- List of sailing boat types
