= Sun Odyssey 45.2 =

Sailboat class

Development
- Designer: Philippe Briand; Jeanneau Design Office
- Location: France
- Year: 1997
- Builder: Jeanneau
- Role: Cruiser
- Name: Sun Odyssey 45.2

Boat
- Displacement: 21,605 lb (9,800 kg)
- Draft: 5.25 ft (1.60 m)

Hull
- Type: monohull
- Construction: fiberglass
- LOA: 46.42 ft (14.15 m)
- LWL: 38.42 ft (11.71 m)
- Beam: 14.70 ft (4.48 m)
- Engine: Yanmar 59 or 88 hp (44 or 66 kW) diesel engine

Hull appendages
- Keel: fin keel with weighted bulb
- Ballast: 8,102 lb (3,675 kg)
- Rudder: spade-type rudder

Rig
- Rig type: Bermuda rig
- I foretriangle height: 51.80 ft (15.79 m)
- J foretriangle base: 16.33 ft (4.98 m)
- P mainsail luff: 46.00 ft (14.02 m)
- E mainsail foot: 16.40 ft (5.00 m)

Sails
- Sailplan: masthead sloop
- Mainsail area: 377.20 sq ft (35.043 m^{2})
- Jib/genoa area: 422.95 sq ft (39.293 m^{2})
- Total sail area: 800.15 sq ft (74.336 m^{2})

Racing
- PHRF: 60-114

The Sun Odyssey 45.2 is a French sailboat that was designed by Philippe Briand and the Jeanneau Design Office as a cruiser and first built in 1997.

The boat was also sold as the Moorings 45.2 to Moorings Yacht Charter and as the Stardust 453 three-cabin boat and Stardust 454 four-cabin boat for the general yacht charter market.

== Production ==
The design was built by Jeanneau in France, 1997 until 2003, but it is now out of production.

== Design ==
The Sun Odyssey 45.2 is a recreational keelboat, built predominantly of fiberglass, with wood trim. It has a masthead sloop rig, a raked stem plumb stem, a reverse transom with step and a swimming platform, an internally mounted spade-type rudder controlled by a wheel and a fixed fin keel with a weighted bulb, or an optional deep-draft keel. The fin keel model displaces 21,605 lb (9,800 kg) and carries 8,102 lb (3,675 kg) of ballast, while the deep draft keel version displaces 20,924 lb (9,491 kg) and carries 7,110 lb (3,225 kg) of ballast.

The boat has a draft of 5.25 ft (1.60 m) with the standard fin keel and 6.58 ft (2.01 m) with the optional deep draft keel.

The boat is fitted with a Japanese Yanmar diesel engine of 59 or 88 hp (44 or 66 kW) for docking and maneuvering. The fuel tank holds 54 U.S. gallons (200 L; 45 imp gal) and the fresh water tank has a capacity of 159 U.S. gallons (600 L; 132 imp gal). A smaller 106 U.S. gallons (400 L; 88 imp gal) water capacity was a factory option.

The design was produced in versions with three or four cabins, with sleeping accommodation for six to eight people. The three cabin version has a double berth in the bow cabin, a U-shaped settee and a straight settee on the starboard side of the main cabin and two aft cabins with a double berth in each. The galley is located on the port side amidships. The galley has a straight configuration and is equipped with a four-burner stove, an ice box and a double sink. A navigation station is opposite the galley, on the starboard side. There are two heads, one just aft of the bow cabin on the starboard side and one on the port side, aft. The four cabin version divides the large bow cabin into two smaller cabins, each with a double berth.

The design has a hull speed of 8.31 kn (15.39 km/h) and a PHRF handicap ranging from 60 to 114.

== Operational history ==
In a 2015 review for RightBoat, Samantha Wilson wrote, "the Jeanneau Sun Odyssey 45.2 is a luxury cruising sailboat that represents a balance between performance, comfort, and elegance. It has fine entry lines, a responsive and quick hull, and an unencumbered deck layout, together with luxurious 3-cabin accommodation below deck. Teak joinery is blended with white fabric liners to create a bright feeling. A second-hand Jeanneau Sun Odyssey 45.2 is a yacht that comes with a well-deserved reputation as a fast luxurious passage-maker."

== See also ==
- List of sailing boat types
