= Northern 1/4 Ton =

Canadian sailboat class

Development
- Designer: Cuthbertson & Cassian
- Location: Canada
- Year: 1972
- Builder: Northern Yachts
- Name: Northern 1/4 Ton

Boat
- Displacement: 3,400 lb (1,542 kg)
- Draft: 4.00 ft (1.22 m)

Hull
- Type: Monohull
- Construction: Fibreglass
- LOA: 23.67 ft (7.21 m)
- LWL: 19.33 ft (5.89 m)
- Beam: 8.42 ft (2.57 m)
- Engine: Outboard motor

Hull appendages
- Keel: fin keel
- Ballast: 1,450 lb (658 kg)
- Rudder: internally-mounted spade-type/transom-mounted rudder

Rig
- General: Masthead sloop
- I foretriangle height: 28.00 ft (8.53 m)
- J foretriangle base: 9.00 ft (2.74 m)
- P mainsail luff: 23.30 ft (7.10 m)
- E mainsail foot: 8.00 ft (2.44 m)

Sails
- Mainsail area: 93.20 sq ft (8.659 m^{2})
- Jib/genoa area: 126.00 sq ft (11.706 m^{2})
- Total sail area: 219.20 sq ft (20.364 m^{2})

The Northern 1/4 Ton is a Canadian sailboat, that was designed by Cuthbertson & Cassian as an International Offshore Rule Quarter Ton class racer and first built in 1972.

The Northern 1/4 Ton design was developed into the Mirage 24 by Cuthbertson & Cassian in 1972.

== Production ==
The boat was built by Northern Yachts in Ajax, Ontario, Canada, starting in 1972, but is now out of production.

== Design ==
The Northern 1/4 Ton is a small recreational keelboat, built predominantly of fibreglass. It has a masthead sloop rig, a transom-hung rudder and a fixed fin keel. It displaces 3,400 lb (1,542 kg) and carries 1,450 lb (658 kg) of ballast.

The boat has a draft of 4.00 ft (1.22 m) with the standard keel fitted.

The boat has a hull speed of 5.89 kn (10.91 km/h).

== See also ==
- List of sailing boat types

Related development

- Mirage 24

Similar sailboats

- Achilles 24
- Challenger 24
- J/24
- MacGregor 24
- San Juan 24
- Seidelmann 245
- Shark 24
