= C&C SR 25 =

Sailboat class

SR 25
Development
- Designer: Glenn Henderson
- Location: Canada
- Year: 1996
- No. built: 3
- Builder: C&C Yachts
- Name: SR 25

Boat
- Displacement: 1,860 lb (844 kg)
- Draft: 5.42 ft (1.65 m) with keel down

Hull
- Type: Monohull
- Construction: Fibreglass
- LOA: 25.50 ft (7.77 m)
- LWL: 21.00 ft (6.40 m)
- Beam: 8.50 ft (2.59 m)
- Engine: Outboard motor

Hull appendages
- Keel: lifting keel
- Rudder: internally-mounted spade-type rudder

Rig
- Rig type: Bermuda rig
- I foretriangle height: 25.55 ft (7.79 m)
- J foretriangle base: 9.05 ft (2.76 m)
- P mainsail luff: 27.25 ft (8.31 m)
- E mainsail foot: 11.66 ft (3.55 m)

Sails
- Sailplan: Fractional rigged sloop
- Mainsail area: 158.87 sq ft (14.760 m^{2})
- Jib/genoa area: 115.61 sq ft (10.741 m^{2})
- Total sail area: 2,074.48 sq ft (192.725 m^{2})

Racing
- PHRF: 120 (average)

The C&C SR 25 is a Canadian racing sailboat that was designed by Glenn Henderson and first built in 1996.

== Production ==
The design was built by C&C Yachts starting in 1996. It was the last of the SR series of boats and three were completed.

== Design ==
The SR 25 is a racing keelboat, built predominantly of fibreglass. It has a fractional sloop rig, a nearly plumb stem, a reverse transom, an internally-mounted spade-type rudder controlled by a tiller and a lifting fin keel. It displaces 1,860 lb (844 kg).

The boat has a draft of 5.42 ft (1.65 m) with the lifting keel extended and 1.33 ft (0.41 m) with it retracted, allowing ground transportation on a trailer.

The boat may be fitted with a small outboard motor for docking and maneuvering.

The design has a PHRF racing average handicap of 120 with a high of 126 and low of 120. It has a hull speed of 6.14 kn (11.37 km/h).

== See also ==
- List of sailing boat types

Related development

- C&C SR 21
- C&C SR 27
- C&C SR 33

Similar sailboats

- Achilles 24
- Challenger 24
- Melges 24
- J/80
