= S2 7.9 =

US recreational keelboat

Development
- Designer: Graham & Schlageter
- Location: United States
- Year: 1981
- No. built: 545
- Builder: S2 Yachts
- Role: Racer
- Name: S2 7.9

Boat
- Displacement: 4,250 lb (1,928 kg)
- Draft: 5.00 ft (1.52 m) with keel down

Hull
- Type: monohull
- Construction: fiberglass
- LOA: 25.92 ft (7.90 m)
- LWL: 21.67 ft (6.61 m)
- Beam: 9.00 ft (2.74 m)
- Engine: outboard motor

Hull appendages
- Keel: daggerboard keel
- Ballast: 1,675 lb (760 kg)
- Rudder: transom-mounted rudder

Rig
- Rig type: Bermuda rig
- I foretriangle height: 30.50 ft (9.30 m)
- J foretriangle base: 9.50 ft (2.90 m)
- P mainsail luff: 29.42 ft (8.97 m)
- E mainsail foot: 12.25 ft (3.73 m)

Sails
- Sailplan: fractional rigged sloop
- Mainsail area: 180.20 sq ft (16.741 m^{2})
- Jib/genoa area: 144.88 sq ft (13.460 m^{2})
- Total sail area: 325.07 sq ft (30.200 m^{2})

Racing
- Class association: MORC
- PHRF: 168

The S2 7.9, originally called the Grand Slam 7.9, is a recreational keelboat that was designed by Graham & Schlageter as a one-design and Midget Ocean Racing Club (MORC) racer-cruiser and first built by S2 Yachts in Holland, Michigan, United States. The designation indicates the length overall in meters.

== Production ==
In 1989 the company was asked by the S2 7.9 Class Association if the design could be put back into limited production and the company agreed, but with a minimum order of ten boats for production to be restarted. The association and the S2 dealership network tried to come up with the ten orders, but was unable to do so at that time. Practical Sailor magazine termed this incident, "an unfortunate commentary on the sailboat industry" and noted it marked the end of sailboat production for the company.

A few more boats were built by S2's Tiara division in 1990 and 1994.

== Design ==
The S2 7.9 is built predominantly of hand laid fiberglass with an end-grain balsa core, with wood trim. All models have a raked stem, a plumb transom and a transom-hung, pivoting rudder controlled by a tiller.

The boat is normally fitted with a small outboard motor for docking and maneuvering. A German BMW inboard diesel engine of 7.5 hp (6 kW) was a factory option plus a few were factory-equipped with Yanmar diesels.

The design has sleeping accommodation for four people, with a double "V"-berth in the bow cabin, and two straight settee quarter berths in the main cabin. The galley is located on the port side just forward of the companionway ladder. The galley is on the port side, is "minimal" and is equipped with an icebox and a sink, but no stove. The head is located next to the keel trunk on the starboard side. Cabin headroom is 64 in (163 cm).

For sailing the design is equipped with a 155% genoa or a 105% jib. For sailing downwind the design may be equipped with a symmetrical spinnaker.

The design has a PHRF racing average handicap of 168 and a hull speed of 6.24 kn (11.56 km/h).

With a beam of 9.00 ft (2.74 m) the boat is not legally trailerable in most North American jurisdictions.

== Variants ==
S2 7.9 FK
This fixed keel model, with a masthead sloop rig, was introduced in 1979 and produced until 1986, but only 17 boats were built. It displaces 4,050 lb (1,837 kg) and carries 1,550 lb (703 kg) of ballast. The boat has a draft of 5.00 ft (1.52 m) with the standard keel.
S2 7.9
This lifting daggerboard keel model, with a fractional sloop rig, was introduced in 1981, produced until 1986 and 545 boats were constructed. It displaces 4,250 lb (1,928 kg) and carries 1,675 lb (760 kg) of lead ballast. One third of the ballast is in the keel and the balance fiberglassed into the hull. The boat has a draft of 5.00 ft (1.52 m) with the lifting keel down and 1.12 ft (0.34 m) with the keel up.

== Reception ==
In a 2000 review Darrell Nicholson wrote in Practical Sailor, "S2 did a good job of aiming the boat at a variety of sailors: racers, daysailors, and weekenders. For racers interested in a one-design boat, the class is not strong outside the Great Lakes. But for the sailor into handicap racing, the boat seems a good possibility. It’s definitely competitive in MORC and PHRF fleets. And unlike other high-performance boats its size—the Olson 25, J/24, Merit 25, Evelyn 26, or Capri 25 — the 7.9 is a boat you could stand sleeping aboard or taking on a rainy overnight race."

Brook Berth wrote in Sailing Magazine, "the S2 7.9 is a nicely designed, well-built one-design racer that can be cruised on short trips."

Jack Hornor wrote in The SpinSheet, "the S2 7.9 provides exhilarating sailing performance and has the added benefit of sufficient accommodations to make occasional weekend cruises or overnight races tolerable at least. "

A Sailing World review called the boat an "eminently sailable family cruiser-racer."
