= Ajax 23 =

Development
- Name: Ajax 23

Boat
- Crew: 3

Hull
- Hull weight: 854 kg 1900 lb
- LOA: 7.07 m (23.2 ft)
- Beam: 1.95 m (6 ft 5 in)

Sails
- Mainsail area: 20.0 m^{2} 215 sq.ft
- Spinnaker area: 20.62 m^{2} 220 sq.ft

== History ==
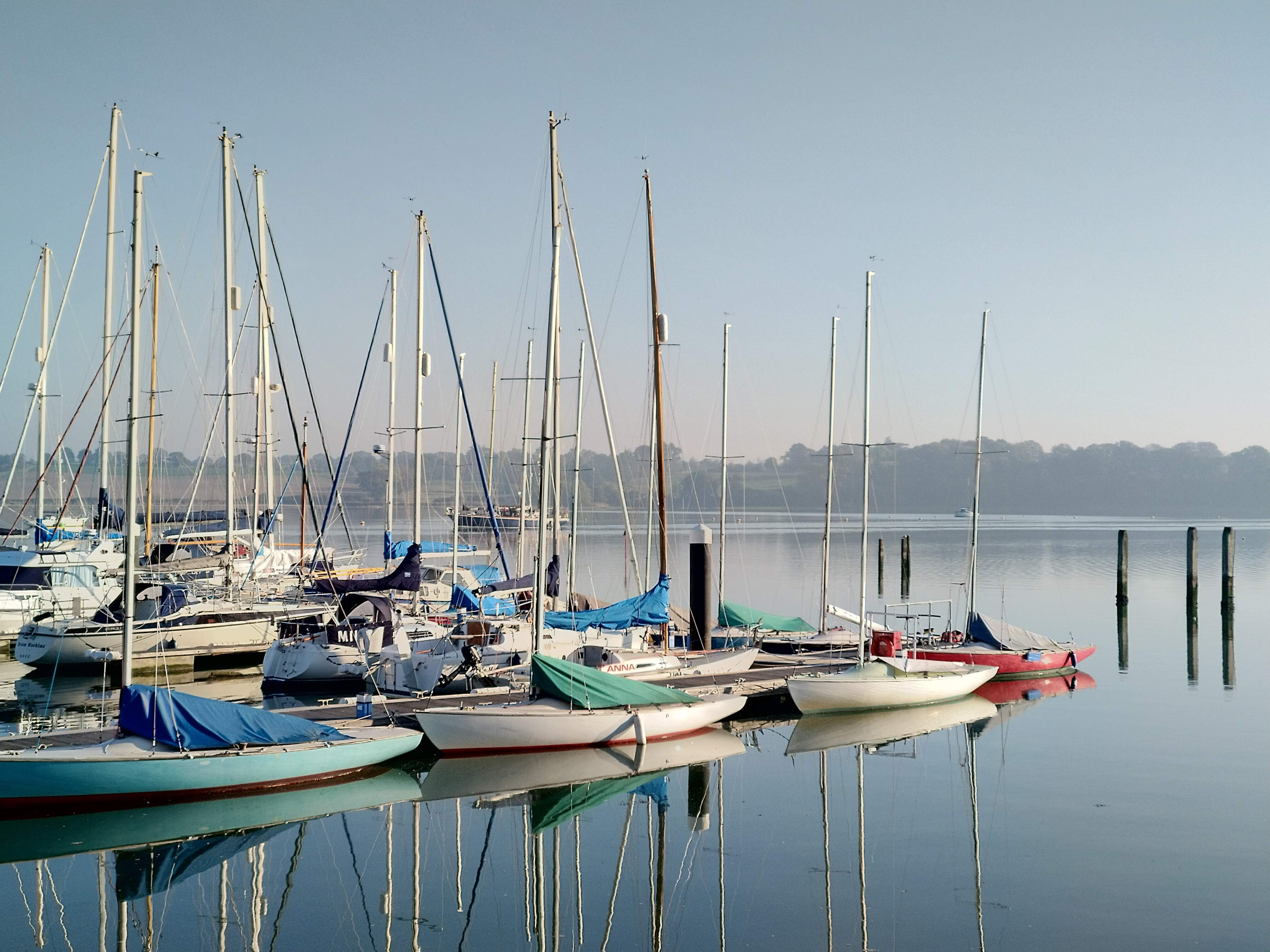
Ajaxes berthed at the Royal Harwich Yacht Club

The Ajax 23 is a keelboat designed by Oliver Lee in 1967. It is a 23 ft boat sailed by 3 people. The Ajax 23 is built out of GRP and built by Halmatic. Roughly 60 boats are in existence with 1 in Sydney another in Ireland and the rest split between sailing on the River Orwell at Woolverstone near Ipswich at the Royal Harwich Yacht Club and in St Mawes, Cornwall.

== National Championships ==
The National Championships for the Ajax Class take place in the summer each year, and are alternately hosted by the Royal Harwich Yacht Club (racing taking place in Dovercourt Bay) and St Mawes Sailing Club (racing taking place in the River Fal estuary). The National Championships at St Mawes generally precede Falmouth Week, which also includes class racing for Ajaxes.

== Related Designs ==
- The Ajax is similar to the, smaller and more numerous, Squib which Oliver Lee later designed.
- Achilles 24 Is a small cruising yacht based on the Ajax. This was designed by Oliver Lee and Chris Butler as a cruiser-racer.
