= Pearson Electra =

1960s US recreational keelboat

Development
- Designer: Carl Alberg
- Location: United States
- Year: 1960
- No. built: 350
- Builder: Pearson Yachts

Boat
- Displacement: 3,000 lb (1,361 kg)
- Draft: 3.00 ft (0.91 m)

Hull
- Type: Monohull
- Construction: Solid laminate Fiberglass
- LOA: 22.50 ft (6.86 m)
- LWL: 16.75 ft (5.11 m)
- Beam: 7.00 ft (2.13 m)
- Engine: Outboard motor

Hull appendages
- Keel: long keel
- Ballast: 1,299 lb (589 kg)
- Rudder: keel-mounted rudder

Rig
- Rig type: Bermuda rig
- I foretriangle height: 26.50 ft (8.08 m)
- J foretriangle base: 8.50 ft (2.59 m)
- P mainsail luff: 23.00 ft (7.01 m)
- E mainsail foot: 10.00 ft (3.05 m)

Sails
- Sailplan: Masthead sloop
- Mainsail area: 115.00 sq ft (10.684 m^{2})
- Jib/genoa area: 112.63 sq ft (10.464 m^{2})
- Total sail area: 227.63 sq ft (21.148 m^{2})

Racing
- Class association: MORC

Rating
- PHRF: 264

The Pearson Electra is a recreational keelboat that was designed by Carl Alberg as a Midget Ocean Racing Club (MORC) racer and first built in 1960.

The Electra design was developed into the Pearson Ensign in 1962, primarily by enlarging the cockpit and shrinking the cabin. The two boats share the same hull design.

== Production ==
The Electra was the second design built by Pearson Yachts. A total of 350 examples were completed before production ended.

== Design ==
The Electra is a recreational keelboat, built predominantly of fiberglass, with wood trim. It has a masthead sloop rig, a spooned raked stem, a raised reverse transom, a keel-mounted rudder controlled by a tiller and a fixed long keel. It displaces 3,000 lb (1,361 kg) and carries 1,299 lb (589 kg) of ballast.

The design has a draft of 3.00 ft (0.91 m) with the standard long keel and is normally fitted with a small 3 to 6 hp (2 to 4 kW) outboard motor for docking and maneuvering.

The design has sleeping accommodation for four people, with a double "V"-berth in the bow cabin and two straight settee berths in the main cabin. The head is located in the bow cabin under the "V"-berth. Cabin headroom is 42 in (107 cm).

The design has a PHRF racing average handicap of 264 and a hull speed of 5.48 kn (10.15 km/h).

== Reception ==
In a 2010 review Steve Henkel wrote, "this early fiberglass Alberg design was introduced the year after the ground-breaking 29-foot Pearson Triton hit the ways in 1959, and was one of the first small fiberglass cruising sailboats. In those days the marketers weren't always sure what the market would bear, so the Electra at first was sold as a basic two-berth overnighter, with extra cost options that would make her a full-fledged cruiser (forward berths, galley, icebox, toilet, etc.). The Pearson Ensign 22, a weekend version using the same hull but featuring a larger cockpit and smaller cabin, followed in 1962, and turned out to be much more popular than the Electra. Best features: The Electra, being a near clone of the Ensign, has many of the same stats, which make her relatively fast for her day (though definitely not faster relative to more recent designs). Some say she is better looking than many of the cruisers in her size range. Worst features: Compared to the Hunter 22, her comp[etitor] other than the Ensign, she generally has less headroom. Her draft is deep enough for casual racing, but wouldn't stand up to many deeper-draft keelboats or shallower boats with centerboards (unless her extremely high PHRF rating could be brought to bear)."
