= Dolphin 24 =

MORC trailer sailer

Development
- Designer: William Shaw of Sparkman & Stephens
- Location: United States
- Year: 1959
- Builders: O'Day Corp. J.J. Taylor and Sons Ltd. US Yachts Inc. Yankee Yachts Inc. Pacific Dolphin Inc.
- Role: Racer
- Name: Dolphin 24

Boat
- Displacement: 4,250 lb (1,928 kg)
- Draft: 5.17 ft (1.58 m) with centerboard down

Hull
- Type: monohull
- Construction: fiberglass
- LOA: 24.16 ft (7.36 m)
- LWL: 19.00 ft (5.79 m)
- Beam: 7.67 ft (2.34 m)
- Engine: outboard motor or Palmer Husky 6 hp (4 kW) gasoline engine

Hull appendages
- Keel: long keel and centerboard
- Ballast: 1,650 lb (748 kg)
- Rudder: keel-mounted rudder

Rig
- Rig type: Bermuda rig
- I foretriangle height: 30.75 ft (9.37 m)
- J foretriangle base: 9.00 ft (2.74 m)
- P mainsail luff: 26.42 ft (8.05 m)
- E mainsail foot: 11.83 ft (3.61 m)

Sails
- Sailplan: masthead sloop
- Mainsail area: 156.27 sq ft (14.518 m^{2})
- Jib/genoa area: 138.38 sq ft (12.856 m^{2})
- Total sail area: 294.65 sq ft (27.374 m^{2})

Racing
- Class association: MORC
- PHRF: 246

The Dolphin 24 is an American trailer sailer and first built in 1959. It was built by a large number of manufacturers between 1959 and 1978.

Some of the boats were also sold as kits for owner completion.

== Design ==
It was designed by William Shaw of Sparkman & Stephens as a Midget Ocean Racing Club (MORC) racer-cruiser. It is Sparkman & Stephens' design #1497.

The fiberglass Dolphin 24 derived from an earlier wooden boat design, the Mermaid 24.

It has a masthead sloop rig, a raked stem; a raised counter, angled transom; a keel-mounted rudder controlled by a tiller and a fixed long keel, with a centerboard. It displaces 4,250 lb (1,928 kg) and carries 1,650 lb (748 kg) of ballast.

After a fire destroyed the deck molds, some boats were finished with wooden decks and wooden coach house roofs.

The boat has a draft of 5.17 ft (1.58 m) with the centerboard extended and 2.83 ft (0.86 m) with it retracted, allowing operation in shallow water or ground transportation on a trailer.

The boat is fitted with a Palmer Husky 6 hp (4 kW) gasoline engine for docking and maneuvering, or a small, stern well-mounted 4 to 8 hp (3 to 6 kW) outboard motor.

The boats built by Pacific Dolphin were 250 lb (113 kg) lighter, but used a fiberglass centerboard with a lead core in place of the bronze centerboard used by Yankee and O'Day. The Pacific Dolphin boats have 310 lb (141 kg) more ballast and an outboard well instead of the optional inboard engine. The fuel tank holds 10 U.S. gallons (38 L; 8.3 imp gal) and the fresh water tank has a capacity of 20 U.S. gallons (76 L; 17 imp gal).

The design has sleeping accommodation for five people, with a double "V"-berth in the bow cabin, a drop down dinette table that converts to a double berth and a small straight settee in the main cabin. The galley is located on the port side at the companionway ladder. The galley is equipped with an icebox and a sink. The head is located just aft of the bow cabin on the starboard side. Cabin headroom is 56 in (140 cm).

The design has a PHRF racing average handicap of 246 and a hull speed of 5.8 kn (10.7 km/h).

The boat is supported by an active class club, the Dolphin 24 Class.

A review by Stephens Waring Yacht Design reported, "one a look at Olin Stephens near-perfect drawing shows why the Dolphin is such a dream to sail. She's moderately light for her time, at 4,250 pounds. Your SUV weighs more. And she can flash ample canvas: The sail area-to-displacement ratio is around 18.2, and conservative by today's standard, but she’s not at all under-canvased. These boats offer many combinations in sail power: symmetrical spinnakers, multiple jibs and overlapping genoas and everything in between. And keep in mind she only draws 2' 10" with the center-board up. Meaning for the brave and the physical, she will push her hull speed with a skilled crew; her balanced helm is easy on the hand."
