= Mustang 22 =

1960s US recreational keelboat

Development
- Designer: Martin Bludworth
- Location: United States
- Year: 1969
- Builder: PlasTrend
- Role: Racer
- Name: Mustang 22

Boat
- Displacement: 1,950 lb (885 kg)
- Draft: 5.25 ft (1.60 m) with centerboard down

Hull
- Type: monohull
- Construction: fiberglass
- LOA: 22.00 ft (6.71 m)
- LWL: 17.00 ft (5.18 m)
- Beam: 7.00 ft (2.13 m)
- Engine: outboard motor

Hull appendages
- Keel: stub keel with centerboard
- Ballast: 750 lb (340 kg)
- Rudder: internally-mounted spade-type rudder

Rig
- Rig type: Bermuda rig
- I foretriangle height: 21.83 ft (6.65 m)
- J foretriangle base: 7.67 ft (2.34 m)
- P mainsail luff: 25.00 ft (7.62 m)
- E mainsail foot: 10.50 ft (3.20 m)

Sails
- Sailplan: fractional rigged sloop
- Mainsail area: 131.25 sq ft (12.194 m^{2})
- Jib/genoa area: 83.72 sq ft (7.778 m^{2})
- Total sail area: 214.97 sq ft (19.971 m^{2})

Racing
- Class association: MORC
- PHRF: 225

The Mustang 22 is a recreational keelboat built by PlasTrend of Fort Worth, Texas from 1969 until 1973 in the United States.

== Design ==
It was designed as a Midget Ocean Racing Club racer. It is predominantly of fiberglass. It has a fractional sloop rig or optional masthead sloop rig; a spooned, raked stem; a raised counter, reverse transom, an internally mounted spade-type rudder controlled by a tiller and a fixed stub keel with a split bulb, with a retractable centerboard, which is raised and lowered by a winch. It displaces 1,950 lb (885 kg) and carries 750 lb (340 kg) of ballast.

The design is similar to the PlasTrend 22.

The boat has a draft of 5.25 ft (1.60 m) with the centerboard extended and 2.33 ft (0.71 m) with it retracted, allowing operation in shallow water or ground transportation on a trailer.

The boat is normally fitted with a small 3 to 6 hp (2 to 4 kW) outboard motor for docking and maneuvering.

The design has sleeping accommodation for four people, with a double "V"-berth in the bow cabin, a straight settee on the port side in the main cabin and an aft quarter berth on the port side. The galley is located on both sides just aft of the bow cabin. The optional galley may be equipped with a stove and a sink. The head is in the bow cabin under the "V"-berth. Cabin headroom is 44 in (112 cm).

For sailing downwind the design may be equipped with a symmetrical spinnaker.

The design has a PHRF racing average handicap of 225 and a hull speed of 5.5 kn (10.2 km/h).

== Variants ==
Mustang 22
This model has a fractional sloop rig, with a sail area of 214.97 sq ft (19.971 m^{2}).
Mustang 22 MH
This model has a masthead sloop rig with a sail area of 196.77 sq ft (18.281 m^{2}).

== Reception ==
In a 2010 review Steve Henkel wrote that the boat "has an unusual keel-centerboard arrangement, which includes a bulb on the keel ... combined with a centerboard slot splitting the keel in two. The centerboard, weighing 150 pounds, is cranked up and down using a winch mounted on the aft cabin bulkhead on the starboard side of the cockpit. A small inboard was optional, though we don’t see where it would fit in such a shallow hull. Best features: She looks sleek and fast, with her long cockpit and low profile. Worst features: Her buoyancy is low, due to her extended counter and pinched aft end thereby limiting weight at the back end, so her long cockpit is mostly unusable while racing. Her relatively narrow beam and low sitting headroom keep her from being a very comfortable cruiser—not that many owners would have cruising in mind, anyway. Finally, her diamond strut and 3/4 fractional rig give her an old-fashioned, outmoded look."
