= Squib (keelboat) =

Type of racing keelboat

- Class symbol

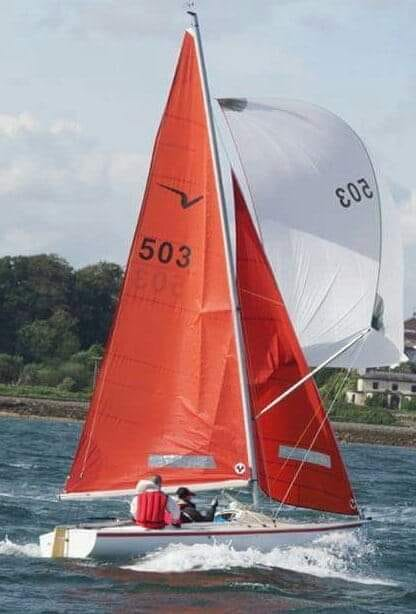

Development
- Designer: Oliver Lee
- Country: United Kingdom
- Name: Squib

Boat
- Crew: 2

Hull
- Hull weight: 1,500 pounds (680 kg)
- LOA: 19 feet (5.8 metres)
- Beam: 6 feet 1 1/2 inches (1.867 metres)

Sails
- Upwind sail area: 170 sq. ft. (15.8 m^{2})

A Squib is a type of small racing keelboat designed in 1967 by Oliver Lee as a successor to the Ajax 23. It is a strict "one-design" class of boat, having a length of 19 feet (5.8 metres), beam of 6 feet 1 1/2 inches (1.867 metres), a sail area of 170 sq. ft. (15.8 sq. mts.) upwind, 310 sq. ft. (29 sq. mts.) total and a weight of 1,500 pounds (680 kg) (including sails and fittings). The usual crew is two people and the boat can be cruised or raced with a Portsmouth Yardstick of 1142. The Squib has been adopted by the RYA as the National Keelboat and is big enough to race at sea and small enough to be trailed easily behind a family car.

== Early history ==
Oliver Lee built the prototype Squib in 1967, using cold moulded wood. Following a succession of trials, the prototype was used as a "plug" from which copies of the boat could be built using glass-reinforced plastic construction. The first to be built was launched in June 1968, with sail number 11. Much later the plug was turned into a functioning boat and still sails. During 1968, a further five Squibs were built, and the first fleet began racing at the Royal Corinthian Yacht Club at Burnham-on-Crouch. Over the following few years numbers grew at Burnham and new fleets were formed at Waldringfield, Brixham, Abersoch and Aldeburgh. The Squib was granted national status by the Royal Yachting Association in 1972, when numbers exceeded 300.

In 1974, with sail numbers approaching 400, some of Britain's yachting journalists were invited to Burnham-on-Crouch to race Squibs, in an event called the "Squib Symposium". This resulted in raising the Squib's profile with the yachting press. Around this time, the Design Centre (now retitled as the Design Council) decided to put the Squib on its index of selected designs.

== Squib builders ==
Boats from number 11 to 157 were built by Oliver Lee in Burnham.

From 158 to 724, Squibs were built under licence by Hunter Boats.

Numbers 725 to 767 were built by Oliver Lee Racing Yacht.

After the death of Oliver Lee, in 1994, the licence moved to Barker Brewer Boats who built 768 to 782.

In 1997 the licence was acquired by Bruce Parker Sailboats who, by Spring 2009, had built 100 Squibs, their first being 783 and final boat 885. They were the only official builder of Squibs until they went into liquidation.

The moulds have been owned by the National Squib Owners Association since 1994 and a new deck and a new hull mould were commissioned in 2009. Strict control is kept over Squib build to ensure that older boats do not become uncompetitive as has happened in some other classes. However, there were keel mould changes in Squib number 230 and again at 465.

Older Squibs are still prized. In 1996, the National Championship winning boat was a Barker Brewer build (771 Arctic Fox.) In 1999 and 2008, Parker built Squibs won. All the other Championships since 1996 were won by older boats, nine of them by boats built before 1972.

By 2010 over 810 Squibs have been built and the National Squib Owners Association has over 640 members.

In June 2014 The National Squib Owners Association (NSOA) announced that Rondar Race Boats have been chosen to be the next builder of the National Squib and it has been decided to number all new Squibs starting at No. 900.

== The squib today ==
By 2010, there are 27 local fleets in the British Isles, 10 of which have over 20 boats. In 2008, the 40th Anniversary Regatta, with 45 entries, was held at Burnham-on-Crouch.

The Squib is not only raced. Cruising is a major feature of the life of the Squib Fleet at Newhaven and Seaford YC and a version of the Squib cruised from Glasgow to Inverness – and one crossed the Atlantic.

The Squib is a favourite boat for people with disabilities and, for example, the East Anglia Sailing Trust, an organisation aimed at providing sailing opportunities for disabled people, uses a fleet of Squibs. In 2009, the Special Olympics (for people with learning disabilities) were held in Leicester. The sailing events were at Rutland and the Squib was selected as the competition boat.

The class is beginning to have international aspirations. There is a fleet regularly raced in Malaysia. In the early days a couple of Squibs went to Tortola, in the British Virgin Islands as day charter boats and a fleet grew there but none of the boats now remain in use. Other early Squibs went to South Africa, Greece, Germany and Australia. Six brand new Squibs recently went to Germany and there is talk of the class featuring in Kiel Woche and of racing on the IJsselmeer in the Netherlands.

== Racing ==
The first UK National Championship was held at Burnham, in 1972, with 29 competitors, and the event has been held at a different venue every year since then. The Nationals move around the Britain and Ireland and have been held from Dundee to Plymouth, as well as in Ireland (four times) and in Wales (eight times). The first 100 boat Nationals fleet was at Howth near Dublin in 1996 and attendance at the Nationals is regularly over 80 boats. In 2009, in Weymouth, 108 Squibs competed in the National Championship. When the UK Nationals are not held in Ireland, a combined northern and Southern Irish Championship is held.

In 1995 Rutland Sailing Club instituted a UK Inland Championship which has proved so popular that it has been held on Rutland Water every year since with the entry limited to 55. In Ireland the Inland Championship is always held at Lough Derg Yacht Club in Dromineer. The first such event was held in 2011. There were 29 entries in 2021.

Squibs are one of the largest fleets at Cowes Week. In 2008, there were 40 Squibs racing, appropriately in the Squib's 40th year.

Counting regional championships, invitational events and regattas, Squibs compete in 25 open events each year – all over Britain and Ireland and, occasionally, on the Continent. Ranked by attendance at National Championships, the Squib is consistently one of the top ten classes. In 2007, only five other classes had larger numbers than the Squib and four of these were children's boats.

Squibs race as a class in Aldeburgh Week, Medway Week, Menai Strait Fortnight, Oulton Week and Tay Week.

In Ireland there are Squib fleets on the East coast at Howth and Dublin Bay. In the North at Cultra on Belfast Lough, and at Killyleagh on Strangford Lough. Squibs on the South coast sail from Kinsale and Glandore. There are inland freshwater fleets on Lough Derg in Dromineer at Lough Derg Yacht Club and Mountshannon at Iniscealtra Sailing Club, with a combined fleet of over 30 Squibs.

== Related design ==
The Sandhopper is a shallow draft version of the Squib, also designed by Oliver Lee. Among others, there are regular racing fleets at locations on the East Coast of England.

The Hunter 19 (Europa) is a development of the Squib, with a cabin added.
