= Mirage 24 =

1970s Canadian recreational keelboat

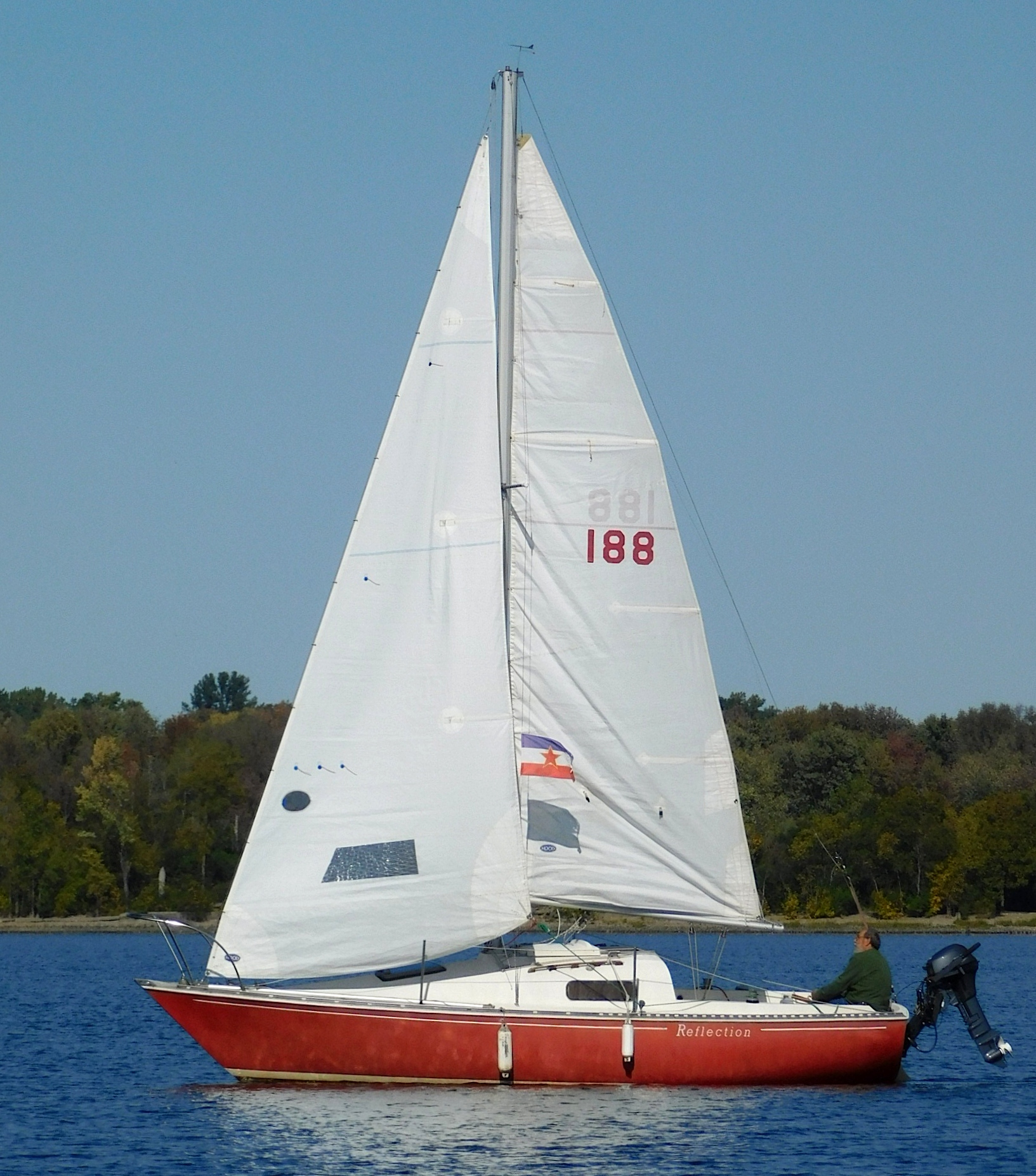

Development
- Designer: Cuthbertson & Cassian
- Location: Canada
- Year: 1972
- Builder: Mirage Yachts
- Name: Mirage 24

Boat
- Displacement: 3,700 lb (1,678 kg)
- Draft: 4.00 ft (1.22 m)

Hull
- Type: Monohull
- Construction: Fibreglass
- LOA: 23.83 ft (7.26 m)
- LWL: 20.08 ft (6.12 m)
- Beam: 8.42 ft (2.57 m)
- Engine: outboard motor

Hull appendages
- Keel: fin keel
- Ballast: 1,500 lb (680 kg)
- Rudder: transom-mounted rudder

Rig
- General: Masthead sloop
- I foretriangle height: 28.00 ft (8.53 m)
- J foretriangle base: 9.00 ft (2.74 m)
- P mainsail luff: 23.30 ft (7.10 m)
- E mainsail foot: 8.30 ft (2.53 m)

Sails
- Mainsail area: 96.70 sq ft (8.984 m^{2})
- Jib/genoa area: 126.00 sq ft (11.706 m^{2})
- Total sail area: 222.70 sq ft (20.690 m^{2})

Racing
- Class association: MORC
- PHRF: 225

The Mirage 24 is a recreational keelboat first built in 1972 by Mirage Yachts in Canada. The design is now out of production.

== Design ==
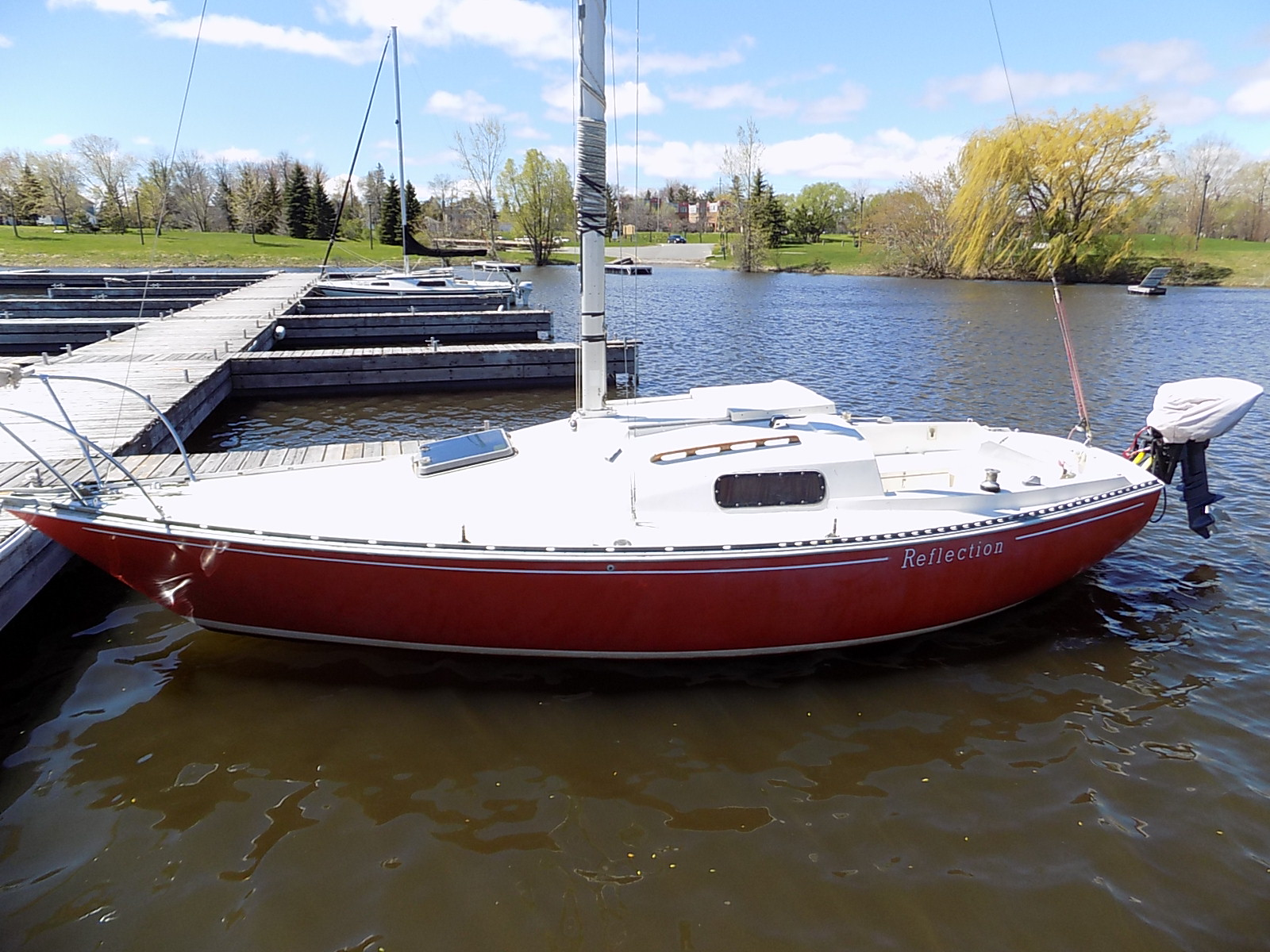
Mirage 24

A development of the Northern 1/4 Ton, it was designed at C&C Yachts as a Midget Ocean Racing Club racer.

Dick and Irene Steffen owned a yacht dealership for C&C Yachts in Pointe Claire, Quebec. The company had been very successful selling C&C boats, but the C&C line did not offer a boat smaller than the C&C 27 at that time. Dick Steffen was a competitive sailing racer and thought that there would be a good market for a C&C-built 24 foot keelboat for MORC racing. At his request Cuthbertson & Cassian designed the boat, but decided not to proceed with production at C&C. Steffen bought the design from them and founded Mirage Yachts in February 1972 to build the boat.

The Mirage 24 sold well and the company soon had 15 employees building the boat model in their rented second floor facility in Pointe-Claire. One factor driving the Mirage 24's strong sales was its racing record in MORC class events. Even 15 years after its introduction a Mirage 24 won the production boat division in the MORC national championships.

Caught off guard by the success of the design, C&C decided to produce a competitor, the C&C 25, which was very similar to the Mirage 24's design. The Mirage 24 continued to sell well and usually beat the C&C 25 in competition.

The fibreglass hull has a transom-hung rudder and a fixed fin keel, with a hull speed of 6.00 kn (11.11 km/h). The ballast is higher in the hull than some similar boats.

The design has sleeping accommodation for four people, with a double "V"-berth in the bow cabin and two straight settee berths in the main cabin. The galley is located on the starboard side at the companionway ladder. The galley is equipped with a two-burner stove, icebox and a double sink. The head is located just aft of the bow cabin on the port side. Cabin headroom is 57 in (145 cm).

It is a masthead sloop and performs well in medium winds. It was also available in a short mast version, and a tall mast version.

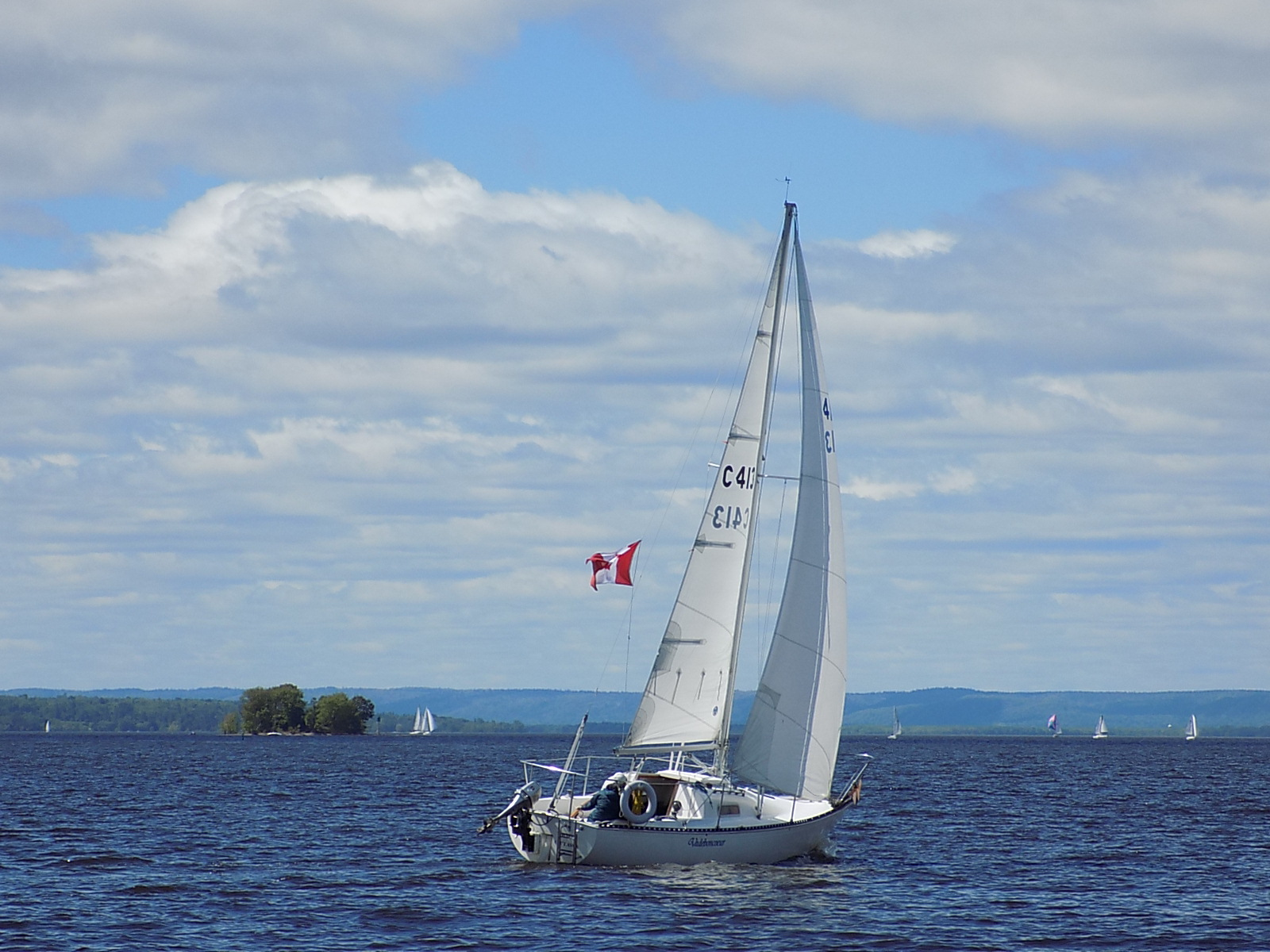
Mirage 24

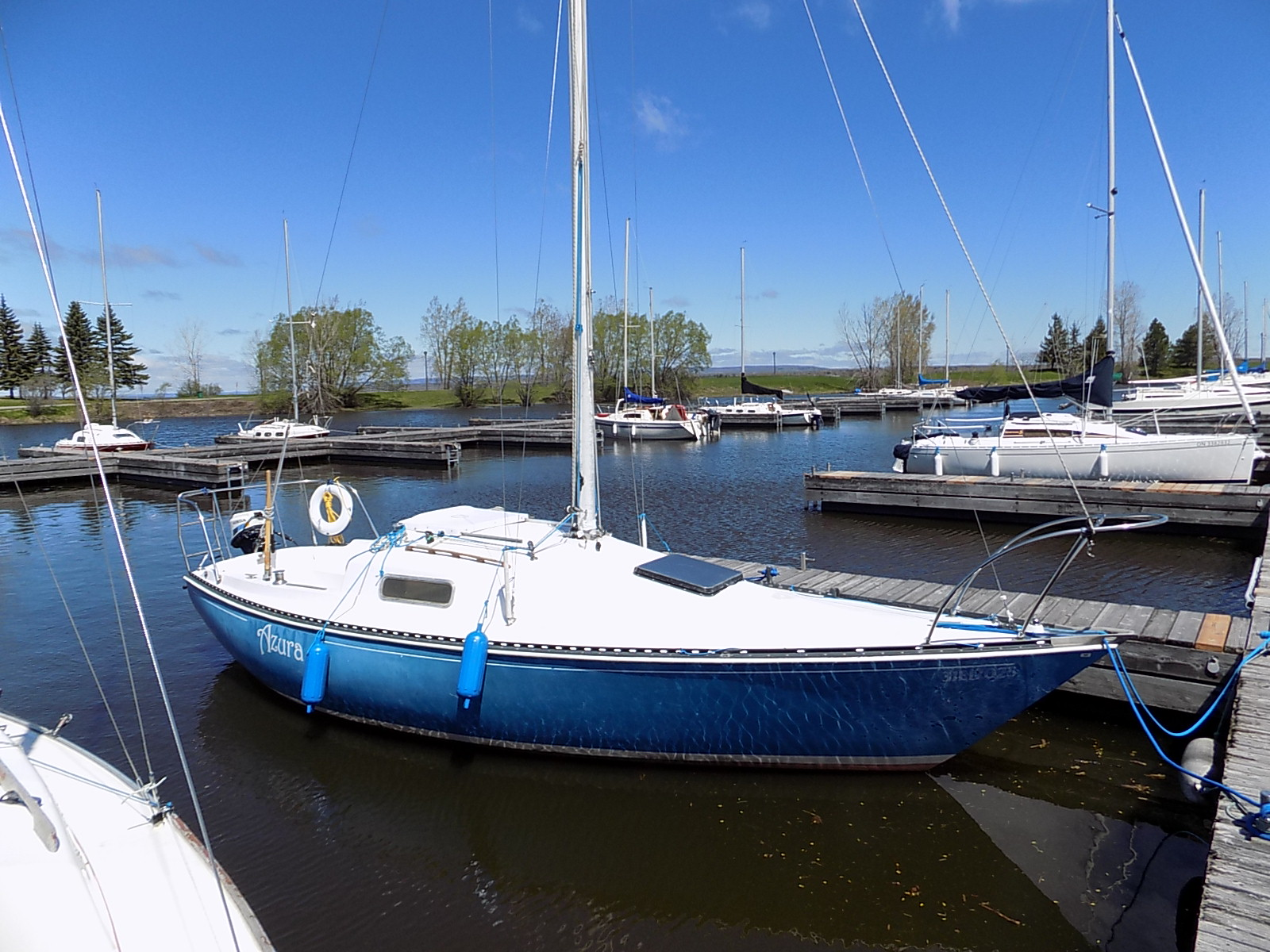
Mirage 24
