= C&C SR 21 =

Sailboat class

SR 21
Development
- Designer: Glenn Henderson
- Location: Canada
- Year: 1992
- Builder: C&C Yachts
- Name: SR 21

Boat
- Displacement: 1,380 lb (626 kg)
- Draft: 4.50 ft (1.37 m) with keel down

Hull
- Type: Monohull
- Construction: Fibreglass
- LOA: 21.08 ft (6.43 m)
- LWL: 18.00 ft (5.49 m)
- Beam: 8.00 ft (2.44 m)
- Engine: Outboard motor

Hull appendages
- Keel: lifting keel
- Ballast: 439 lb (199 kg)
- Rudder: internally-mounted spade-type rudder

Rig
- Rig type: Bermuda rig
- I foretriangle height: 22.11 ft (6.74 m)
- J foretriangle base: 7.25 ft (2.21 m)
- P mainsail luff: 25.53 ft (7.78 m)
- E mainsail foot: 9.69 ft (2.95 m)

Sails
- Sailplan: Fractional rigged sloop
- Mainsail area: 123.69 sq ft (11.491 m^{2})
- Jib/genoa area: 80.15 sq ft (7.446 m^{2})
- Total sail area: 203.84 sq ft (18.937 m^{2})

Racing
- PHRF: 165 (average)

The C&C SR 21 is a Canadian racing sailboat that was designed by Glenn Henderson and first built in 1992. It was introduced under the name SR MAX.

== Production ==
The design was built by C&C Yachts starting in 1992, but it is now out of production.

== Design ==
The SR 21 is a racing keelboat, built predominantly of fibreglass. It has a fractional sloop rig, a raked stem, an open reverse transom, an internally-mounted spade-type rudder controlled by a tiller and a lifting fin keel. It displaces 1,380 lb (626 kg) and carries 439 lb (199 kg) of ballast.

The boat has a draft of 4.50 ft (1.37 m) with the lifting keel extended and 0.92 ft (0.28 m) with it retracted, allowing ground transportation on a trailer.

The boat may be fitted with a small outboard motor for docking and maneuvering.

The design has a PHRF racing average handicap of 165 with a high of 174 and low of 159. It has a hull speed of 5.69 kn (10.54 km/h).

== See also ==
- List of sailing boat types

Related development

- C&C SR 25
- C&C SR 27
- C&C SR 33

Similar sailboats

- Capri 22
- J/22
