= Pearson Ensign =

Sailboat class

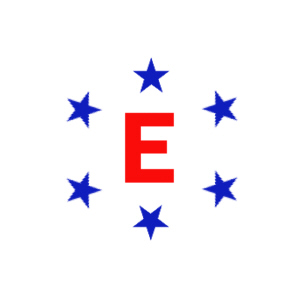
- Class symbol

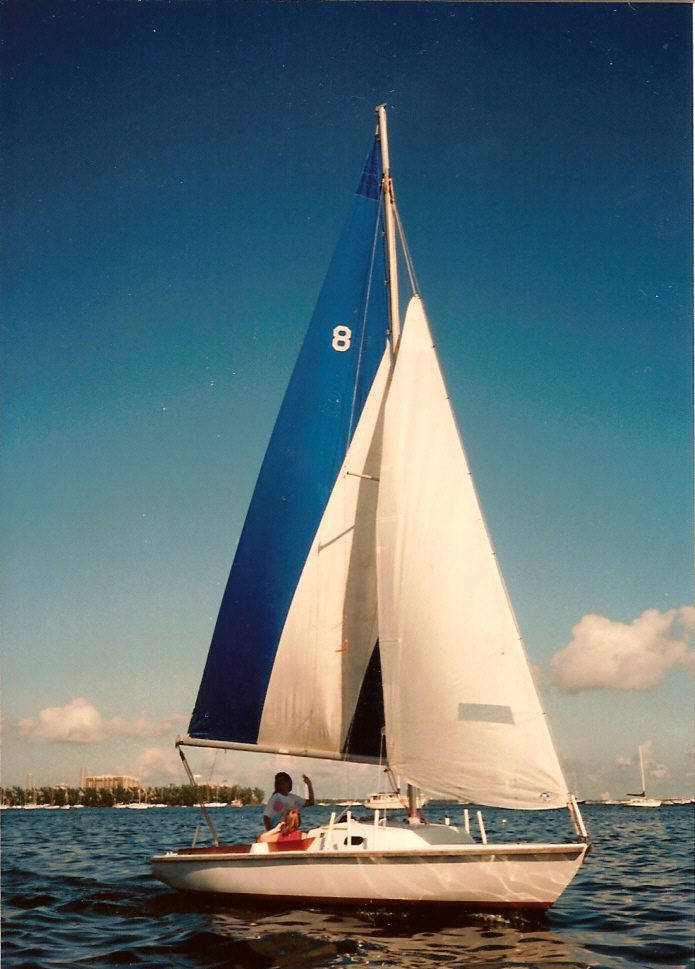

Development
- Designer: Carl Alberg
- Location: United States
- Year: 1962
- No. built: 1776
- Builders: Pearson Yachts, Ensign Spars

Boat
- Displacement: 3,000 lb (1,361 kg)
- Draft: 3.00 ft (0.91 m)

Hull
- Type: Monohull
- Construction: Fiberglass
- LOA: 22.50 ft (6.86 m)
- LWL: 16.75 ft (5.11 m)
- Beam: 7.00 ft (2.13 m)
- Engine: Outboard motor

Hull appendages
- Keel: long keel
- Ballast: 1,200 lb (544 kg)
- Rudder: keel-mounted rudder

Rig
- Rig type: Bermuda rig
- I foretriangle height: 25.00 ft (7.62 m)
- J foretriangle base: 7.50 ft (2.29 m)
- P mainsail luff: 25.42 ft (7.75 m)
- E mainsail foot: 11.08 ft (3.38 m)

Sails
- Sailplan: Fractional rigged sloop
- Mainsail area: 140.83 sq ft (13.084 m^{2})
- Jib/genoa area: 93.75 sq ft (8.710 m^{2})
- Total sail area: 234.58 sq ft (21.793 m^{2})

Racing
- Class association: MORC
- PHRF: 258

The Pearson Ensign is a 22-foot recreational full-keel keelboat best known as a robust day sailer and one-design racer.

It was built by Pearson Yachts of Bristol, Rhode Island and later by Ensign Spars of Dunedin, Florida.

== Design ==
The Ensign is a development of the Pearson Electra, both designed by Carl Alberg. The fiberglass hull has balsawood cores, wood trim, a spooned raked stem, a raised reverse transom, a keel-mounted rudder controlled by a tiller and a fixed long keel. It has foam flotation, making it unsinkable. The only class-permitted mast adjustment while sailing is the backstay which is controlled by a turnbuckle. The boat displaces 3,000 lb (1,361 kg) and carries 1,200 lb (544 kg) of ballast.

The cuddy cabin has two berths and may be fitted with an optional stove. The cabin has headroom of 3 ft 10 in (117 cm). The design has sleeping accommodation for two people, with a double "V"-berth in the bow cabin. The head is located in the bow cabin under the bow "V"-berth. The cockpit is 8 ft 8 in (264 cm) and features a teak wood sole, coamings and seats.

The boat has a draft of 3.00 ft (0.91 m) with the standard long keel and is normally fitted with a small 3 to 5 hp (2 to 4 kW) outboard motor for docking and maneuvering.

The design has a PHRF racing average handicap of 258 and a hull speed of 5.48 kn (10.15 km/h).

It has a fractional sloop rig.

== Operational history ==
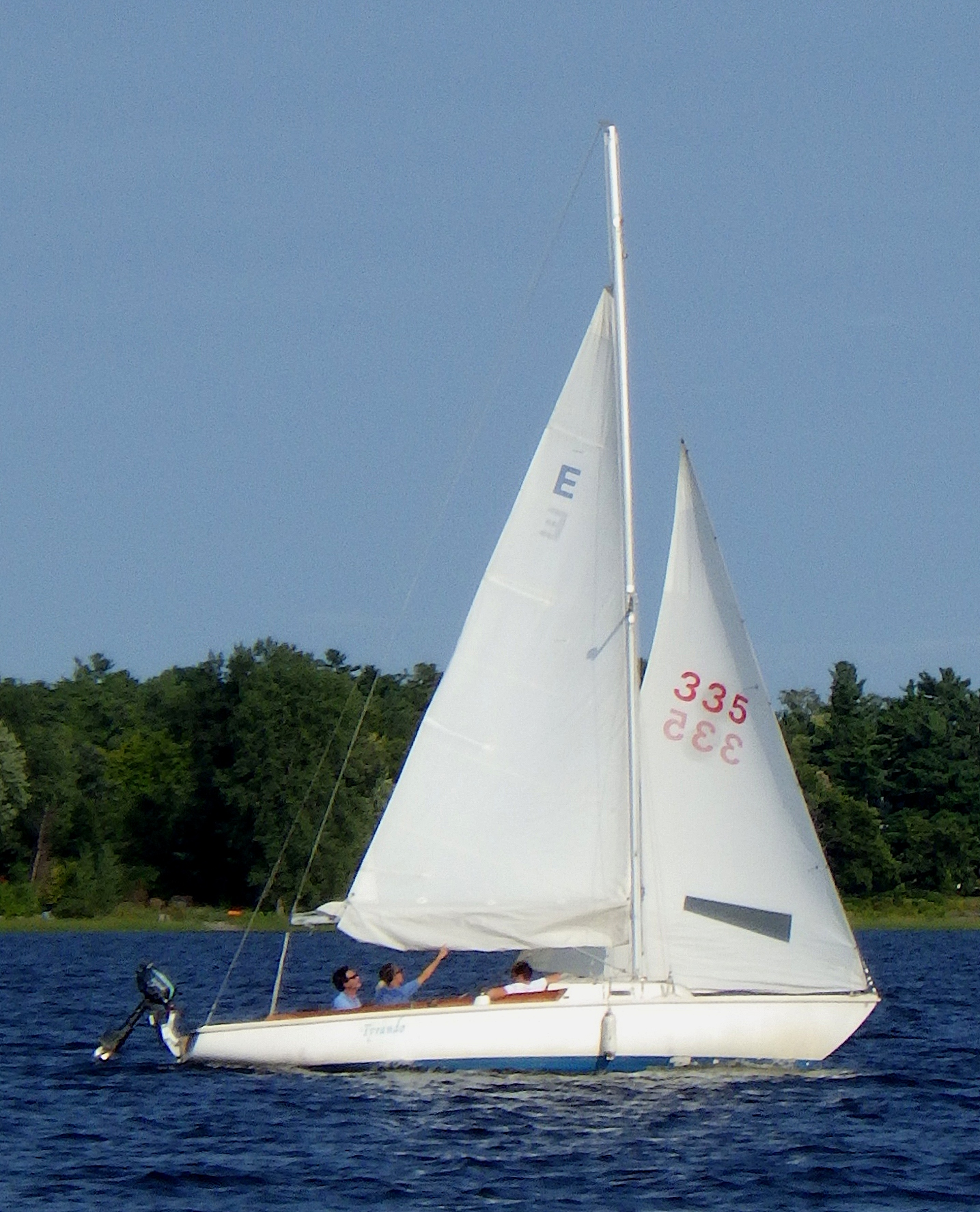
A Pearson Ensign

The boat is supported by an active class club, the Pearson Yachts Portal.

Racing fleets were first formed when the design entered production, in 1962. The first fleet was formed in Larchmont, New York. By 1963 nine more fleets had been formed, with locations in Houston, Texas; Hingham, Massachusetts; Providence, Rhode Island; Huntington, New York, Port Washington, New York; Miami, Florida; Gibson Island, Maryland and Falmouth, Maine.

By 1994 there were 47 fleets sailing in 20 US states.

== Reception ==
In a 2010 review Steve Henkel wrote, "The Ensign is a daysailer-overnighter and one-design racing version of the Pearson Electra cruiser ... Compared to the Electra, she has the same hull, but a tiny cuddy cabin with two bunks, and a much larger cockpit that can hold 8 (or 3 or 4 while racing). Since the year 2000, Ensigns have been built by Ensign Spars of Dunedin, [Florida]. Best features: She is a competent, forgiving, stable, and easy-to-sail one-design class racer. Over the years a strong class organization has developed ... A deep cockpit gives the Ensign above-average crew comfort. With an optional toilet, cushions for the bunks, and perhaps air mattresses for extra sleeping space in the cockpit under a boom tent if desired, she can be made into a plain-jane but reasonably comfortable weekender. Used boat prices can be quite attractive. Worst features: This boat was once considered fast, but that's no longer true compared to modern racing designs—and many of the boats are getting quite old and less competitive, though you can still find fleets to race with here and there. The cockpit is not self-bailing, so a boom tent is required to keep rain from filling her when her crew is not in attendance."

=== American Sailboat Hall of Fame ===
The Ensign was inducted into the now-defunct Sail America American Sailboat Hall of Fame in 2002. In honoring the design the hall cited, "She is rarely the belle of the ball. In fact, some hotshots have even been known to call Ensigns 'tubby' as they go zipping by in their dripping-wet performance dinghies. But a funny thing tends to happen when sailors stop to take a closer look at this long lived one-design racer and family daysailer. They notice the old girl is more attractive than they thought. In fact, she's got some pretty nice curves. Before they know it they're in love. ... Stable, comfortable, maybe a bit plain, the Ensign nonetheless has a deep-seated quality that inevitably shines through. No doubt the boat will be taking families and racers sailing for generations to come."

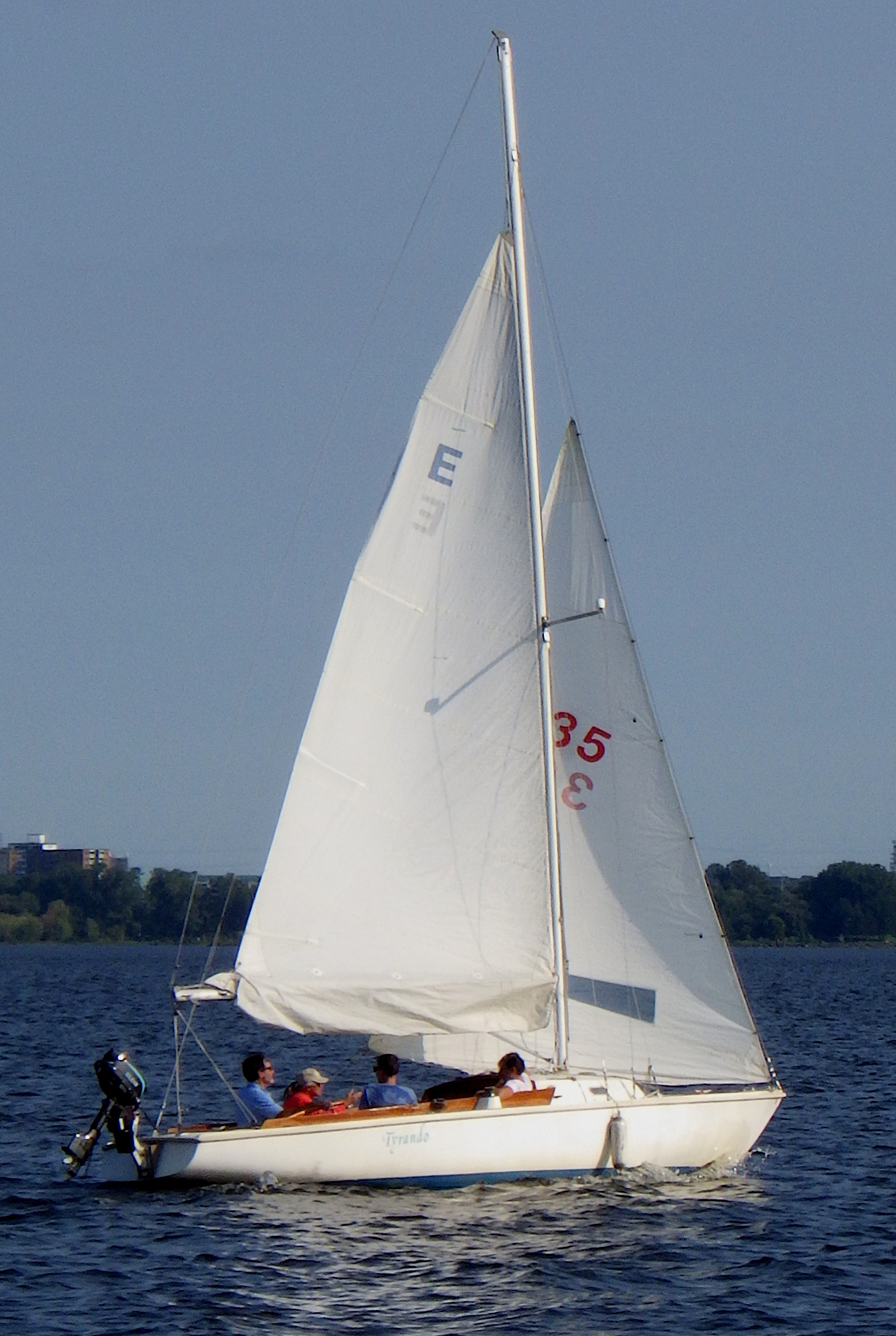
A Pearson Ensign
