= Marlow-Hunter 22 =

Sailboat class

Development
- Designer: Glenn Henderson
- Location: United States
- Year: 2010
- Builder: Hunter Marine

Boat
- Displacement: 2,000 lb (907 kg)
- Draft: 3.50 ft (1.07 m) with keel down

Hull
- Type: Monohull
- Construction: Fiberglass
- LOA: 21.33 ft (6.50 m)
- LWL: 18.75 ft (5.72 m)
- Beam: 7.92 ft (2.41 m)
- Engine: Outboard motor

Hull appendages
- Keel: swing keel
- Ballast: 442 lb (200 kg) of iron
- Rudder: transom-mounted rudder

Rig
- Rig type: B&R rig
- I foretriangle height: 24.10 ft (7.35 m)
- J foretriangle base: 6.87 ft (2.09 m)
- P mainsail luff: 24.83 ft (7.57 m)
- E mainsail foot: 10.67 ft (3.25 m)

Sails
- Sailplan: Fractional B&R rigged sloop
- Mainsail area: 132.47 sq ft (12.307 m^{2})
- Jib/genoa area: 82.78 sq ft (7.691 m^{2})
- Total sail area: 215.25 sq ft (19.997 m^{2})

Rating
- D-PN: 96.5

The Marlow-Hunter 22 is an American trailerable sailboat that was designed by Glenn Henderson as daysailer and racer, first built in 2010. It is a development of the 2003 Hunter 216, but with the hull built of fiberglass, instead of thermo-plastic

The design was originally marketed by the manufacturer in 2010 as the Hunter 22, but was usually referred to as the Hunter 22-2 to differentiate it from the unrelated 1981 Hunter 22 design. When Marlow bought the company in 2012 it was officially renamed the Marlow-Hunter 22.

== Production ==
The design is built by Hunter Marine in the United States. Production started in 2010 and the design remained in production through 2018.

== Design ==
The Marlow-Hunter 22 is a recreational keelboat, built predominantly of fiberglass. It has a fractional sloop B&R rig with no backstay, a plumb stem, a rounded, open reverse transom, a transom-hung rudder controlled by a metal tiller and a swing keel. It displaces 2,000 lb (907 kg) and carries 442 lb (200 kg) of iron ballast.

The design emphasizes cockpit space at the expense of lower deck accommodation. It does have a V-berth in the bow and room for a portable head. In 2018 the manufacturer's base price was US$29,990.

The boat has a draft of 3.50 ft (1.07 m) with the keel extended and 1.00 ft (0.30 m) with it retracted, allowing beaching or ground transportation on a trailer.

The boat is normally fitted with a small outboard motor of up to 10 hp (7.5 kW) for docking and maneuvering.

The design has a hull speed of 5.8 kn (10.7 km/h).

== See also ==
- List of sailing boat types

Related development

- Hunter 22
