= C&C 25 =

Sailboat class

C&C 25 Mk I
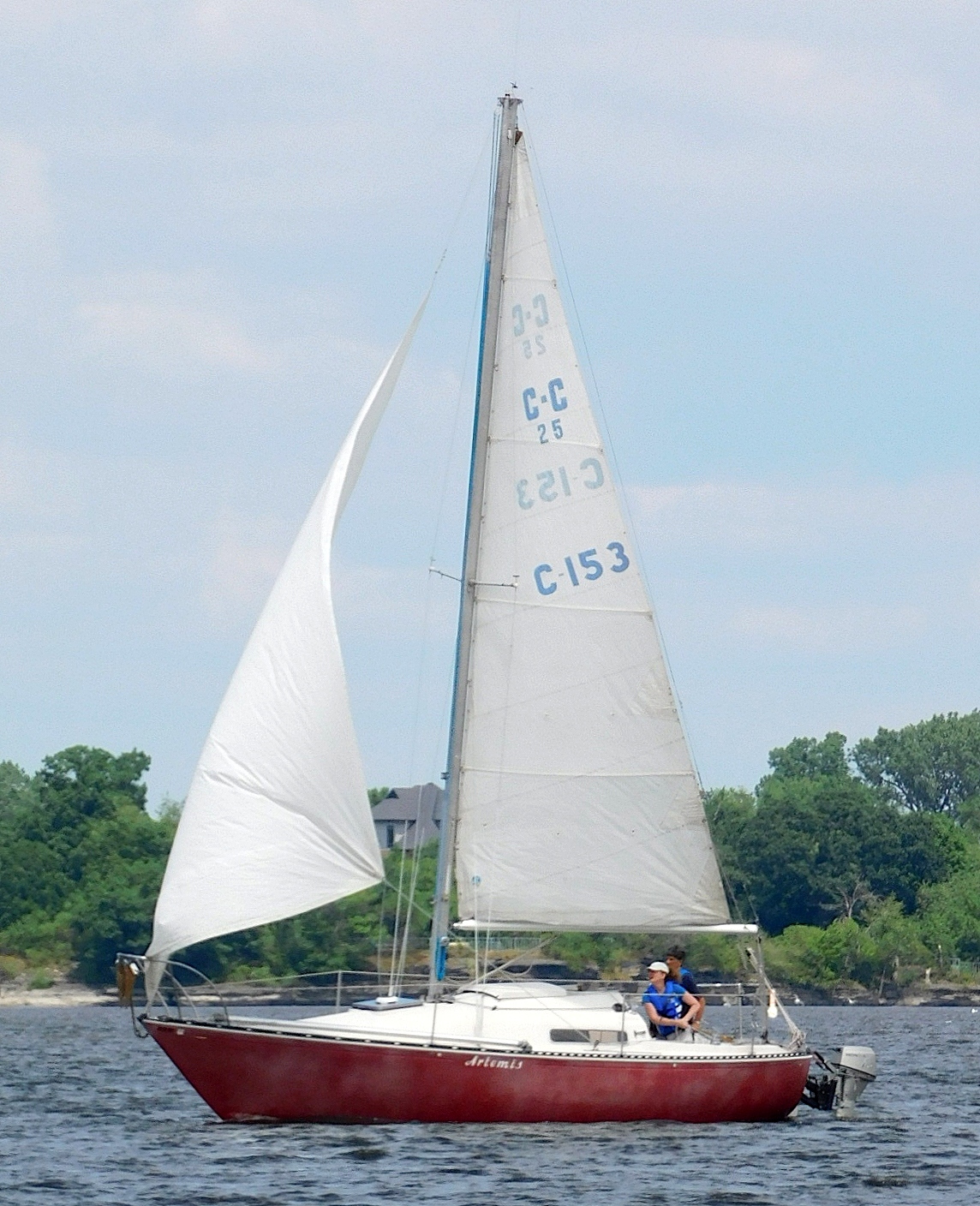
- C&C 25 Mk I

Development
- Designer: Robert W. Ball, C&C Design
- Location: Canada
- Year: 1973
- Builder: C&C Yachts
- Name: C&C 25 Mk I

Boat
- Displacement: 4,300 lb (1,950 kg)
- Draft: 3.75 ft (1.14 m)

Hull
- Type: Monohull
- Construction: Fiberglass
- LOA: 25.16 ft (7.67 m)
- LWL: 20.67 ft (6.30 m)
- Beam: 8.58 ft (2.62 m)
- Engine: Inboard, saildrive or outboard motor

Hull appendages
- Keel: fin keel
- Ballast: 1,900 lb (862 kg)
- Rudder: transom-mounted rudder

Rig
- General: Masthead sloop
- I foretriangle height: 31.50 ft (9.60 m)
- J foretriangle base: 11.00 ft (3.35 m)
- P mainsail luff: 26.50 ft (8.08 m)
- E mainsail foot: 10.00 ft (3.05 m)

Sails
- Mainsail area: 132.50 sq ft (12.310 m^{2})
- Jib/genoa area: 173.25 sq ft (16.095 m^{2})
- Total sail area: 305.75 sq ft (28.405 m^{2})

Racing
- Class association: MORC
- PHRF: 222 (average)

The C&C 25 is a series of Canadian sailboats, first built in 1973.

C&C also produced the unrelated C&C 25 Redline design.

== Production ==
The boat series was built by C&C Yachts in Canada, but it is now out of production.

== Design ==
Dick and Irene Steffen had owned a yacht dealership for C&C Yachts, that was located in Pointe Claire, Quebec. The dealership had done good business selling C&C boats, but the C&C line did not offer a boat smaller than the C&C 27 at that time. Dick Steffen was a competitive sailing racer and thought that there would be a good market for a C&C 24 foot keelboat. At his request C&C designed the boat, but decided not to proceed with production. Steffen bought the design from C&C, founding Mirage Yachts in February 1972 to build the design. The Mirage 24 sold well and quickly established a strong racing record in Midget Ocean Racing Club (MORC) class events. Caught off guard by the success of the boat, C&C decided to design a competitor, which they named the C&C 25, that was very similar to the Mirage 24's design.

The C&C 25 designs are both a small recreational keelboats, built predominantly of fiberglass, with wood trim. They have masthead sloop rigs, transom-hung rudders and fixed fin keels.

== Variants ==
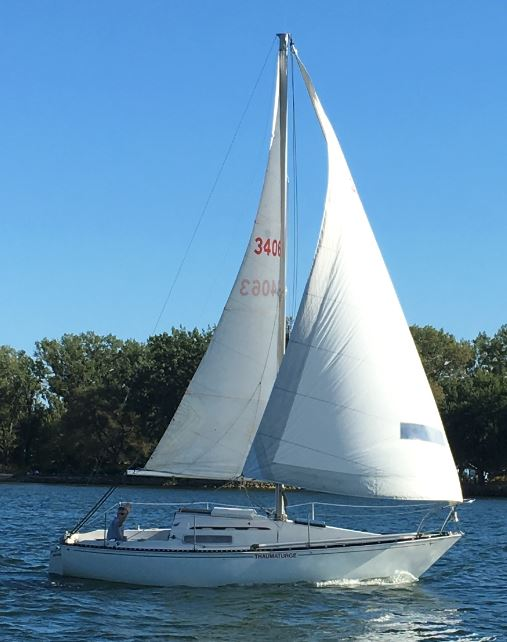
C&C 25 Mk I

C&C 25 Mk I or 25-1
This model was designed by C&C Design and introduced in 1973. It has a length overall of 25.16 ft (7.7 m), a waterline length of 20.67 ft (6.3 m), displaces 4,300 lb (1,950 kg) and carries 1,900 lb (862 kg) of lead ballast. The boat has a draft of 3.75 ft (1.14 m) with the standard keel fitted. The boat is fitted with an inboard, saildrive or outboard motor. The fresh water tank has a capacity of 10 U.S. gallons (38 L; 8.3 imp gal). The boat has a PHRF racing average handicap of 222 with a high of 219 and low of 225. It has a hull speed of 6.09 kn (11.28 km/h).

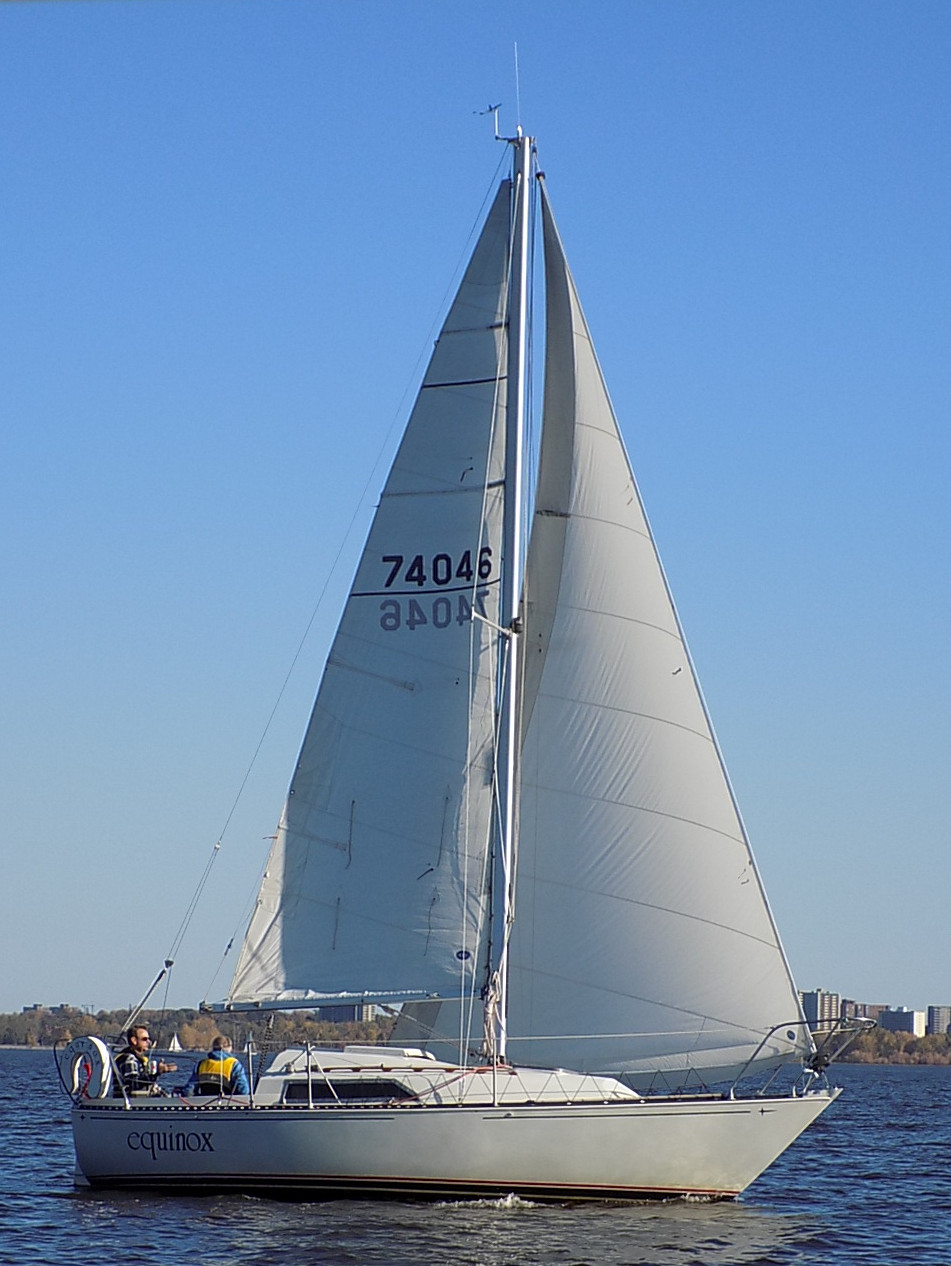
C&C 25 Mk II

C&C 25 Mk II or 25-2
This model was a complete redesign of the earlier C&C 25 by Robert W. Ball and introduced in 1980. A smaller and lighter boat than its predecessor, it has a length overall of 25.08 ft (7.6 m), a waterline length of 20.00 ft (6.1 m), displaces 4,150 lb (1,882 kg) and carries 1,880 lb (853 kg) of lead ballast. The boat has a draft of 4.25 ft (1.30 m) with the standard keel fitted. The boat has a PHRF racing average handicap of 216 with a high of 238 and low of 207. It has a hull speed of 6.09 kn (11.28 km/h).

== Operational history ==
In a review of the Mark II Michael McGoldrick wrote, "The newer version of the C&C 25 (the Mark II) was introduced in the early 1980s. Compared to its predecessor, it has a more modern look about it, a slightly deeper keel which allows it to point a little higher, and a truck cabin that is raised all the way forward (as opposed to the original cabin which sloped downwards towards the front of the boat). Despite all these changes, the new C&C 25 has the same hull design as the original model (The Mark I)."

In a 2010 review Steve Henkel wrote, "the C&C 25 came out in 1972 as a capable racer-cruiser with more than average space below for a 25-footer. Eventually a Mk II version was introduced in the early 1980s, with the same hull and general accommodations plan, but tweaked for more speed ... The newer version replaced the forward-sloping cabin with a longer trunk cabin featuring a bubble at the after end that furnishes a few inches more headroom without appearing top-heavy; a reshaped keel (less raked, deeper by 5 inches) designed for higher pointing; 190 pounds less ballast; and other minor changes. The net result of the tweaking for speed was an average PHRF rating of 222 for both Mk I and Mk II, in other words no change at all ... The galley seems squeezed up too close to the companionway ladder. Claustrophobic cooks beware."

== See also ==
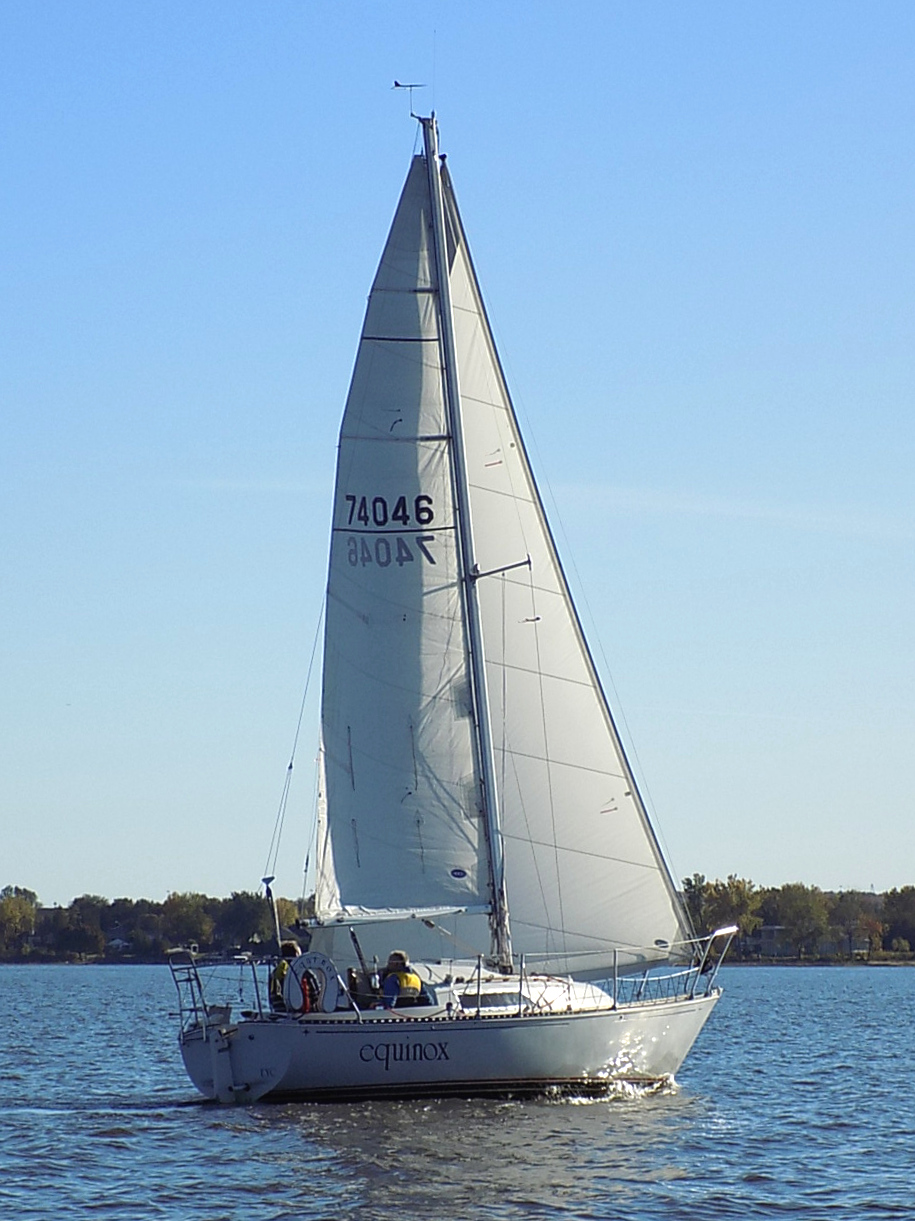
C&C 25 Mk II

- List of sailing boat types
