= Midget Ocean Racing Club =

Sailboat racing association

The Midget Ocean Racing Club, Inc.
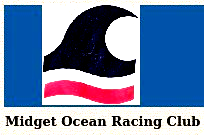
- Abbreviation: MORC
- Formation: 1954
- Type: Maryland domestic corporation
- Purpose: Organization and promotion of sailboat racing
- Location: Severna Park, Maryland, United States
- Members: 2,500 (1978)
- Registered agent: Martin Scholl

The Midget Ocean Racing Club (MORC) was an association that promoted and organized ocean keelboat racing under a handicapping rule that it administered. It was formed at a time when existing rating rules like CCA and later IOR favoured much larger boats.

== History ==
Founded in 1954, it was formally organized as The Midget Ocean Racing Club, Inc., in 1972. It had a board of governors, comprising the commodores of each station (local MORC chapter), plus the national officers of the club.

Started as an ocean racing class for boats too small for the existing off-shore racing classes, the MORC-class boats were initially 24 ft (7.3 m) or less in length, although this was expanded in 1958 to just under 30 ft (9.1 m) and in 1978 to 34 ft (10.4 m).

In 1978 MORC moved to include one-design racing. The rule changes allowed separate starts for races when 20 or more boats of the same design are competing. The organization of one-design fleets was the jurisdiction of the local station. The Western Long Island Sound station was the lead chapter for this implementation.

As of 1978 the club had 68 local "stations" and 2,500 members.

== Boats ==
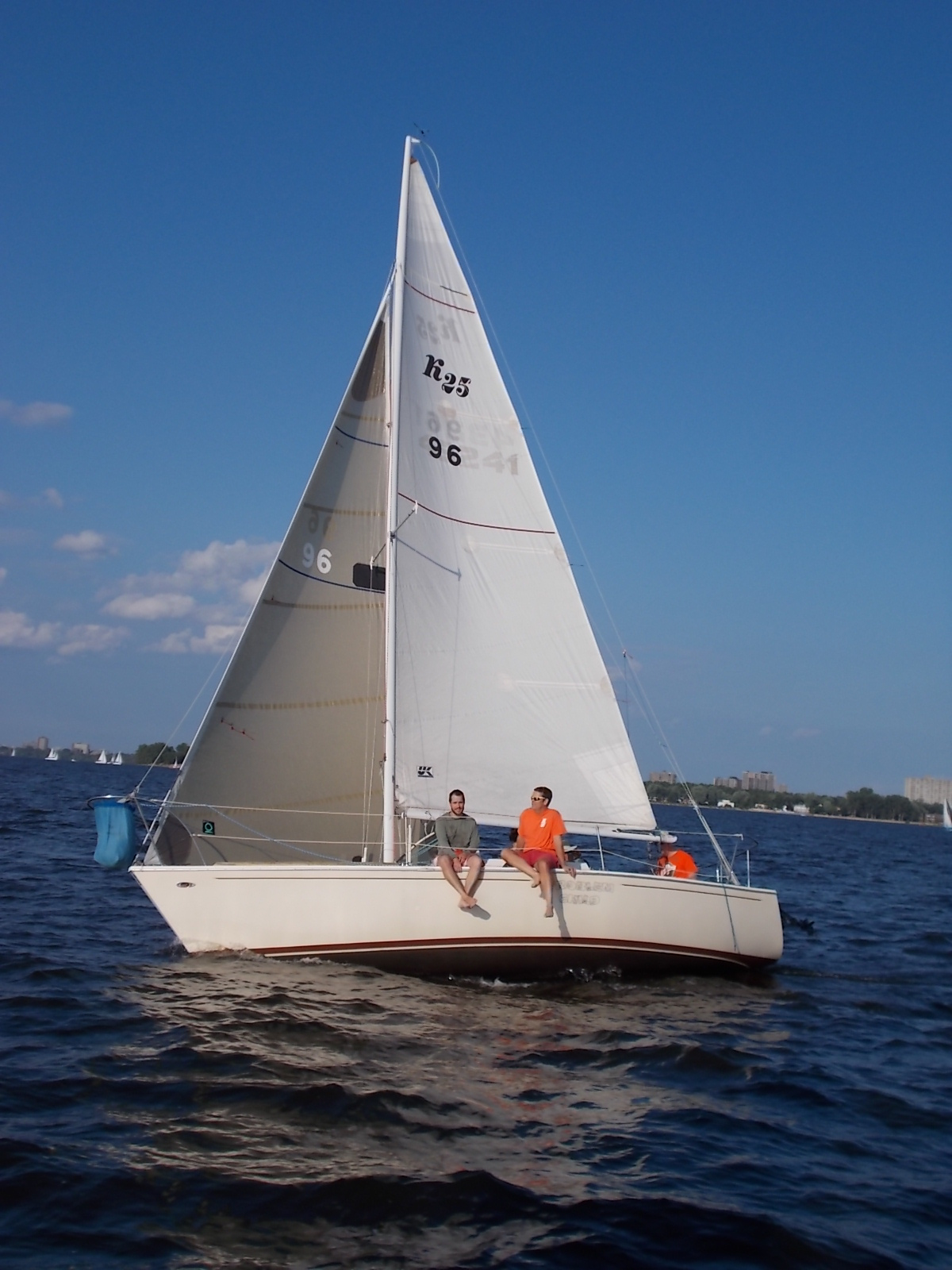
A Kirby 25 MORC racer

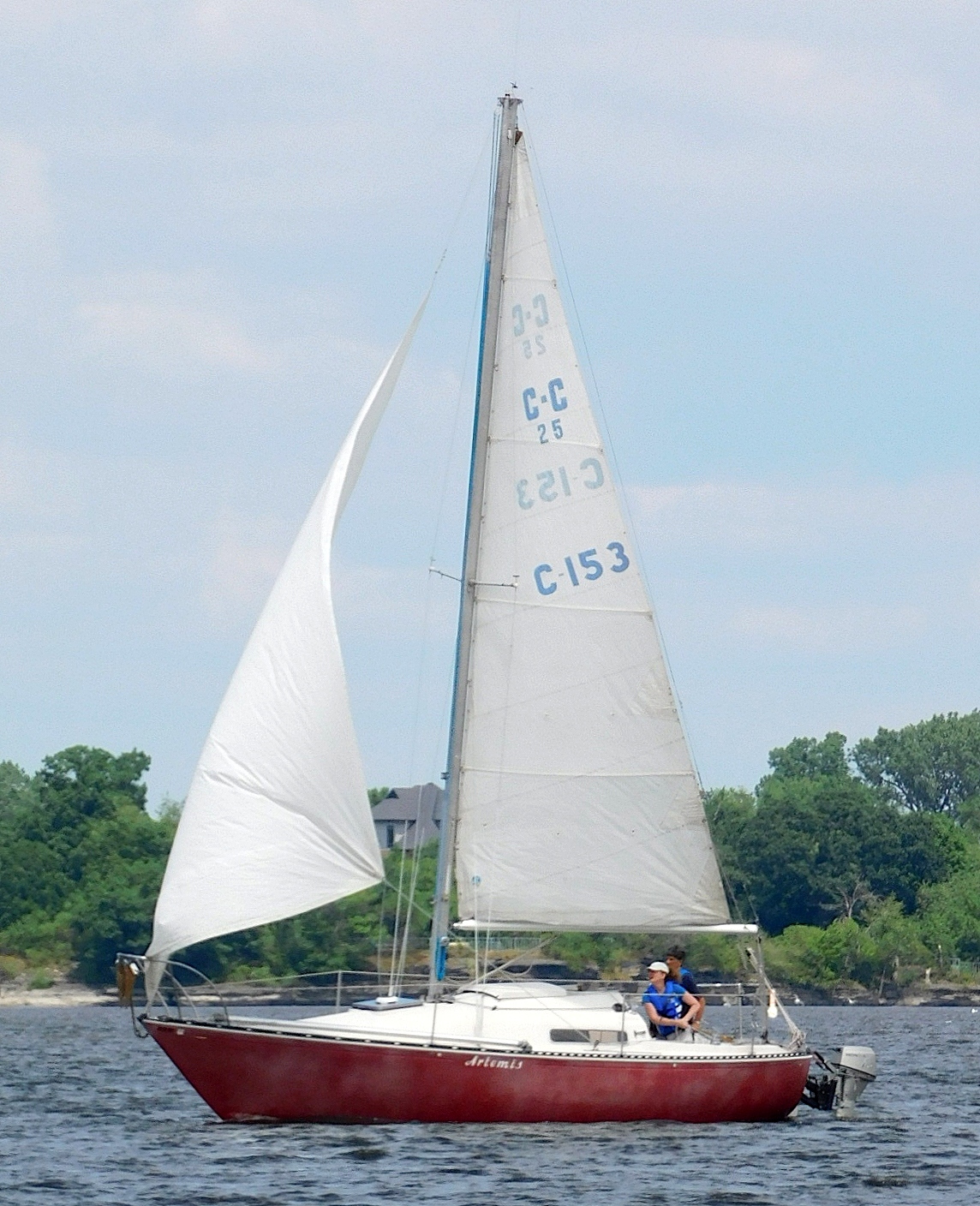
A C&C 25 Mk I MORC racer

Boats designed for MORC include:

- Bluejacket 23
- Bristol 29.9
- Cal 24
- C&C 25
- C&C 29-2
- Dolphin 24
- G&S 27
- Kirby 25
- Harmony 22
- Mariah 27
- Merit 25
- Mirage 24
- Moore 24
- Mustang 22
- Mystic Mini-Ton
- Newport 214
- Olson 25
- S2 7.9
- S2 9.1
- Santana 30/30
- Tartan 27
- Paceship PY 23
- Pearson 30
- Pearson Electra
- Pearson Ensign
- Wavelength 24
