= Hunter 216 =

Sailboat class

Development
- Designer: Glenn Henderson
- Location: United States
- Year: 2003
- No. built: 250
- Builder: Hunter Marine

Boat
- Displacement: 1,250 lb (567 kg)
- Draft: 3.51 ft (1.07 m) with keel down

Hull
- Type: Monohull
- Construction: Thermo plastic
- LOA: 21.49 ft (6.55 m)
- LWL: 18.77 ft (5.72 m)
- Beam: 7.91 ft (2.41 m)
- Engine: Outboard motor

Hull appendages
- Keel: hydraulic swing keel
- Ballast: 500 lb (227 kg)
- Rudder: internally-mounted rudder

Rig
- Rig type: B&R rig
- I foretriangle height: 21.92 ft (6.68 m)
- J foretriangle base: 7.33 ft (2.23 m)
- P mainsail luff: 24.58 ft (7.49 m)
- E mainsail foot: 10.42 ft (3.18 m)

Sails
- Sailplan: Fractional rigged sloop
- Mainsail area: 128.06 sq ft (11.897 m^{2})
- Jib/genoa area: 80.34 sq ft (7.464 m^{2})
- Total sail area: 208.40 sq ft (19.361 m^{2})

Rating
- D-PN: 91.0

The Hunter 216 is an American trailerable sailboat that was designed by Glenn Henderson as a daysailer and cruiser, and first built in 2003.

The Hunter 216 design, with its thermo plastic hull, was developed into the Hunter 22-2 in 2010. The 22-2 is a similar boat, but built in more conventional fiberglass.

== Production ==
The design was built by Hunter Marine in the United States starting in 2003, but it is now out of production. A total of 250 were built.

== Design ==
The Hunter 216 is an unsinkable recreational keelboat, built predominantly of thermo plastic. It has a fractional B&R rig, a plumb stem, an open reverse transom, a lifting internally-mounted VARA rudder controlled by a tiller and a hydraulically operated swing keel. It displaces 1,250 lb (567 kg) and carries 500 lb (227 kg) of lead ballast.

The boat has a draft of 3.51 ft (1.07 m) with the lifting keel extended and 1.02 ft (0.31 m) with it retracted, allowing beaching or ground transportation on a trailer.

Factory options included a 200 sq ft (19 m^{2}) asymmetrical spinnaker, portable toilet, motor mount and a highway trailer.

The boat is normally fitted with a small outboard motor for docking and maneuvering.

The design has a hull speed of 5.81 kn (10.76 km/h).

== See also ==
- List of sailing boat types

Related development

- Hunter 22-2

Similar sailboats

- Hunter 212
- Mistral T-21
- San Juan 21
