= C&C SR 27 =

Sailboat class

SR 27
Development
- Designer: Glenn Henderson
- Location: Canada
- Year: 1992
- No. built: 8
- Builder: C&C Yachts
- Name: SR 27

Boat
- Displacement: 3,750 lb (1,701 kg)
- Draft: 5.22 ft (1.59 m) with keel down

Hull
- Type: Monohull
- Construction: Fibreglass
- LOA: 27.50 ft (8.38 m)
- LWL: 24.00 ft (7.32 m)
- Beam: 9.50 ft (2.90 m)
- Engine: Outboard motor

Hull appendages
- Keel: lifting keel
- Rudder: internally-mounted spade-type rudder

Rig
- Rig type: Bermuda rig

Sails
- Sailplan: Fractional rigged sloop

Racing
- PHRF: 102 (average)

The C&C SR 27 is a Canadian racing sailboat that was designed by Glenn Henderson and first built in 1992.

== Production ==
The design was built by C&C Yachts starting in 1992. Only eight boats were completed.

== Design ==
The SR 27 is a small racing keelboat, built predominantly of fibreglass. It has a fractional sloop rig, a nearly plumb stem, an open reverse transom, an internally-mounted spade-type rudder controlled by a tiller and a lifting fin keel. It displaces 3,750 lb (1,701 kg).

The boat has a draft of 5.92 ft (1.80 m) with the lifting keel extended and 1.50 ft (0.46 m) with it retracted, allowing ground transportation on a trailer.

The boat may be fitted with a small outboard motor for docking and maneuvering.

The design has a PHRF racing average handicap of 102 with a high of 105 and low of 99. It has a hull speed of 6.56 kn (12.15 km/h).

== See also ==
- List of sailing boat types

Related development

- C&C SR 21
- C&C SR 25
- C&C SR 33

Similar sailboats

- C&C 27
- Catalina 275 Sport
- Express 27
