= Merit 25 =

1978 MORC racing sailboat

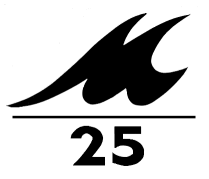
- Class symbol

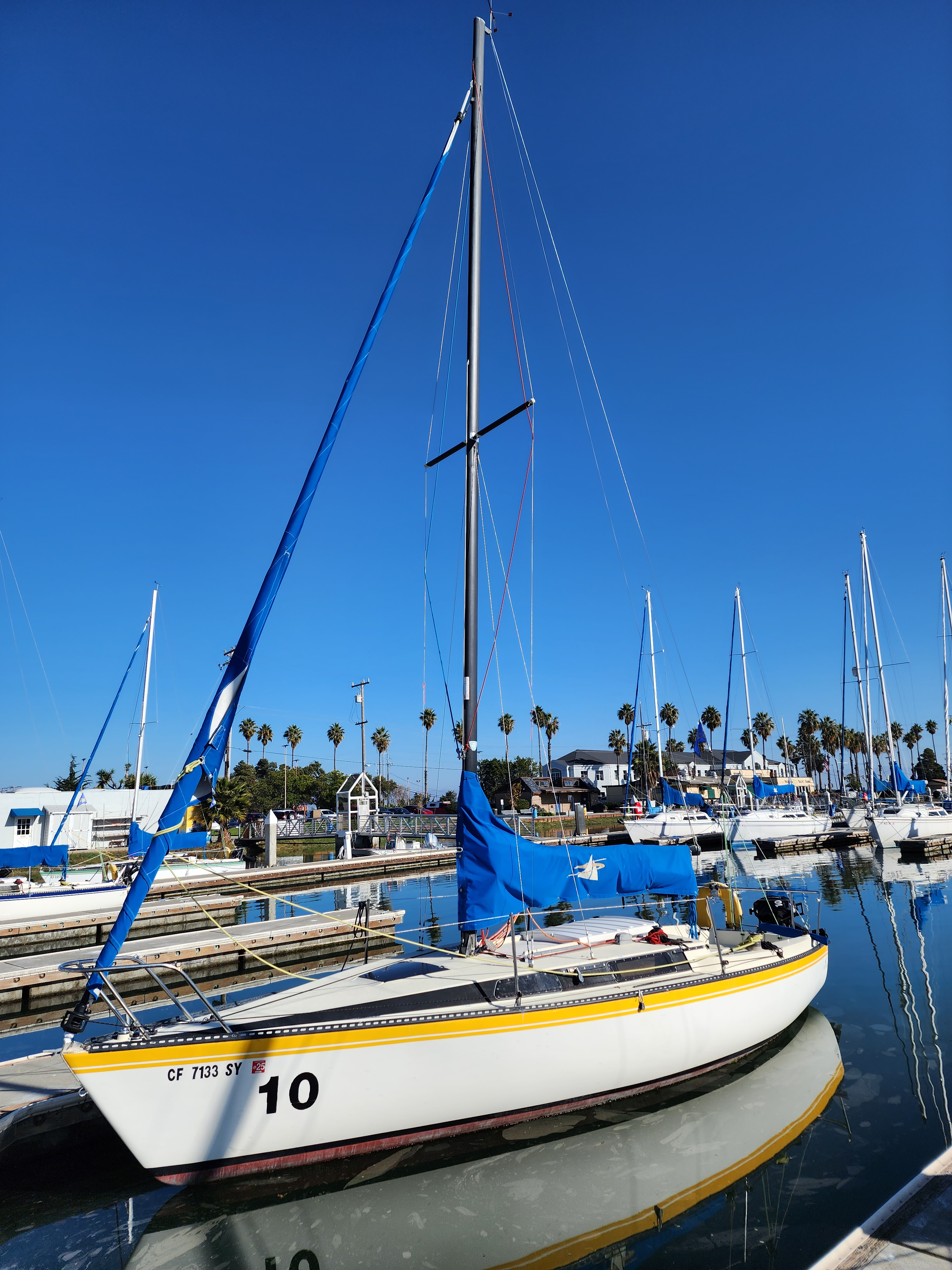

Development
- Designer: Paul Yates
- Location: United States
- Year: 1978
- No. built: 780
- Builder: Merit Marine
- Name: Merit 25

Boat
- Displacement: 2,900 lb (1,315 kg)
- Draft: 4.00 ft (1.22 m)

Hull
- Type: Monohull
- Construction: Fiberglass
- LOA: 24.50 ft (7.47 m)
- LWL: 20.00 ft (6.10 m)
- Beam: 8.00 ft (2.44 m)
- Engine: Outboard motor

Hull appendages
- Keel: fin keel
- Ballast: 1,050 lb (476 kg)
- Rudder: internally-mounted spade-type rudder

Rig
- Rig type: Bermuda rig
- I foretriangle height: 28.75 ft (8.76 m)
- J foretriangle base: 9.66 ft (2.94 m)
- P mainsail luff: 28.00 ft (8.53 m)
- E mainsail foot: 9.75 ft (2.97 m)

Sails
- Sailplan: Fractional rigged sloop Masthead sloop
- Mainsail area: 136.50 sq ft (12.681 m^{2})
- Jib/genoa area: 138.86 sq ft (12.901 m^{2})
- Total sail area: 275.36 sq ft (25.582 m^{2})

Racing
- Class association: MORC
- PHRF: 171 (average)

The Merit 25 is a sailboat designed as a Midget Ocean Racing Club (MORC) racer and first built in 1978.

The design won the MORC Internationals three times.

== Production ==
The design was built by Merit Marine in the United States. The company built 780 examples of the design, starting in 1978, but it is now out of production.

== Design ==
The Merit 25 is a recreational keelboat, built predominantly of fiberglass, with teak wood trim. It has a fractional sloop rig, a raked stem, a slightly reverse transom, an internally mounted spade-type rudder controlled by a tiller and a fixed fin keel. It displaces 2,900 lb (1,315 kg) and carries 1,050 lb (476 kg) of ballast.

The boat has a draft of 4.00 ft (1.22 m) with the standard keel. The fresh water tank has a capacity of 5 U.S. gallons (19 L; 4.2 imp gal).

The boat is normally fitted with a small 4 to 6 hp (3 to 4 kW) outboard motor for docking and maneuvering.

Accommodations include a forward "V"-berth and two main cabin berths that extend under the cockpit to save space. The steel mast support is at the foot of the "V"-berth. The galley has a sink, plus an ice box used as a companionway step. A stove was a factory option. The portable head is located just aft of the "V"-berth and has a curtain for privacy.

The boat has internally mast-mounted halyards, spinnaker-pole lift and outhaul, plus an internally-mounted reefing system. The 4:1 mainsheet traveler is mounted in the middle of the cockpit. A boom vang and Cunningham are standard equipment. The jib is controlled by two blocks on rails and two cockpit-mounted winches. Two additional winches are mounted on the cockpit roof got the halyards.

The design has a PHRF racing average handicap of 171 with a high of 185 and low of 165. It has a hull speed of 5.99 kn (11.09 km/h).

== Reception ==
Richard Sherwood, describing the design in 1994, wrote, "the accent is on racing rather than cruising. Wetted surface is low, lines aft are flat, the keel and rudder are high aspect. She planes."

In a 2010 review Steve Henkel wrote, "according to one unproven but not necessarily false story, a J/24 disappeared into designer/builder Paul Yates’ garage in 1978, and some months later reappeared as the first Merit 25. The two designs are indeed similar in many ways, But the Merit is judged by many to be more comfortable, faster in light air, and less expensive—at least in the San Francisco Bay area, where she was spawned. Best features: She is fast ... The cockpit has backrests of a reasonable height for comfort. The cabin is well-organized for short cruises compared with other boats of the same ilk. She is easily trailered, though launching via hoist is infinitely easier than at a ramp. Worst features: Merit 25s that have been raced hard for a number of years sometimes develop an unusual structural problem: the keel begins to flex at the point of attachment to the hull, requiring a major reinforcement job. This happens primarily, if not exclusively, to post-1984 hulls in which the cabin soles have been lowered to give increased headroom—a design change that reduced the structural integrity of the hull in the area of the keel ..."

The Spinnaker Sailing Club of Redwood City, California has a fleet of 16 Merit 25s. They describe the boats as, "a solidly built 25-foot sloop that seats five comfortably in a self-draining cockpit. Despite relatively simple control systems, the Merit has the durability and flexibility for comfortable, all-season sailing in the Bay Area, where typical wind speeds can range from near zero to above 25 knots."
