= Hunter 22 =

Sailboat class

Hunter 22 Fixed Keel
Development
- Designer: Hunter Design Team
- Location: United States
- Year: 1981
- Builder: Hunter Marine

Boat
- Displacement: 3,400 lb (1,542 kg)
- Draft: 3.16 ft (0.96 m)

Hull
- Type: Monohull
- Construction: Fiberglass
- LOA: 22.25 ft (6.78 m)
- LWL: 18.33 ft (5.59 m)
- Beam: 7.92 ft (2.41 m)
- Engine: Outboard motor

Hull appendages
- Keel: Fin keel
- Ballast: 1,400 lb (635 kg)
- Rudder: Transom-mounted rudder

Rig
- Rig type: Bermuda rig
- I foretriangle height: 27.00 ft (8.23 m)
- J foretriangle base: 9.00 ft (2.74 m)
- P mainsail luff: 23.50 ft (7.16 m)
- E mainsail foot: 8.33 ft (2.54 m)

Sails
- Sailplan: Masthead sloop
- Mainsail area: 97.88 sq ft (9.093 m^{2})
- Jib/genoa area: 121.50 sq ft (11.288 m^{2})
- Total sail area: 219.38 sq ft (20.381 m^{2})

Racing
- PHRF: 255 (average)

The Hunter 22 is an American trailerable sailboat that was designed by the Hunter Design Team and first built in 1981.

== Production ==
The design was built by Hunter Marine in the United States between 1981 and 1985, but it is now out of production.

== Design ==
The Hunter 22 is a recreational keelboat, built predominantly of fiberglass, with wood trim. It has a masthead sloop rig, a raked stem, a vertical transom, a transom-hung rudder controlled by a tiller and a fixed fin keel or centerboard. It is normally fitted with a small 3 to 6 hp (2 to 4 kW) outboard motor for docking and maneuvering.

Standard factory equipment included a stove and cooler, a teak and holly wooden cabin sole, a dinette table and portable head, a 12 U.S. gallons (45 L; 10.0 imp gal) fresh water tank, outboard motor bracket, life jackets and an anchor.

The design has sleeping accommodation for four people, with a double "V"-berth in the bow cabin and two straight settee berths in the main cabin. The galley is located on both sides of the companionway ladder. The galley is equipped with a single-burner stove and a sink. The head is located in the bow cabin on the starbord side under the "V"-berth. Cabin headroom is 51 in (130 cm).

== Operational history ==
In a 2010 review Steve Henkel wrote, "...construction was on the light side, featuring plastic hatch hinges and low-end hardware. Best features: With her big beam, the boat has good space for weekend cruising. Theoretical speed is highest among comp[etitor]s as a result of a relatively long waterline, though low SA/D ratio indicates she will not be fast in light air ... Worst features: ... Owners complain that weather helm be annoying in winds over ten knots. In reality this may be a result of not reefing the main when the breeze pipes up. Owners also complain that, in waves, the outboard prop tends to come out of the water and cavitate."

== Variants ==
Hunter 22 Fixed Keel
This model has a length overall of 22.25 ft (6.8 m), a waterline length of 18.33 ft (5.6 m), displaces 3,400 lb (1,542 kg) and carries 1,400 lb (635 kg) of lead ballast. The boat has a draft of 3.16 ft (0.96 m) with the standard keel fitted. The boat has a PHRF racing average handicap of 255 with a high of 258 and low of 252. It has a hull speed of 5.74 kn (10.63 km/h).
Hunter 22 Centerboard
This model has a length overall of 22.25 ft (6.8 m), a waterline length of 18.33 ft (5.6 m), displaces 3,200 lb (1,451 kg) and carries 1,300 lb (590 kg) of iron ballast. The boat has a draft of 5.00 ft (1.52 m) with the centerboard extended and 1.92 ft (0.59 m) with it retracted, allowing beaching or ground transportation on a trailer. The boat has a PHRF racing average handicap of 255 with a high of 251 and low of 270. It has a hull speed of 5.74 kn (10.63 km/h).

== See also ==
- List of sailing boat types

Related development

- Marlow-Hunter 22
