= Olson 25 =

1980s US recreational keelboat

Development
- Designer: George Olson
- Location: United States
- Year: 1984
- No. built: 130
- Builders: Pacific Boat Works; Ericson Yachts
- Role: Racer-Cruiser
- Name: Olson 25

Boat
- Displacement: 2,900 lb (1,315 kg)
- Draft: 4.50 ft (1.37 m)

Hull
- Type: monohull
- Construction: fiberglass
- LOA: 25.00 ft (7.62 m)
- LWL: 21.50 ft (6.55 m)
- Beam: 9.00 ft (2.74 m)
- Engine: outboard motor

Hull appendages
- Keel: fin keel
- Ballast: 1,300 lb (590 kg)
- Rudder: internally-mounted spade-type rudder

Rig
- Rig type: Bermuda rig
- I foretriangle height: 32.00 ft (9.75 m)
- J foretriangle base: 9.58 ft (2.92 m)
- P mainsail luff: 28.00 ft (8.53 m)
- E mainsail foot: 10.00 ft (3.05 m)

Sails
- Sailplan: masthead sloop
- Mainsail area: 140.00 sq ft (13.006 m^{2})
- Jib/genoa area: 153.28 sq ft (14.240 m^{2})
- Total sail area: 293.28 sq ft (27.247 m^{2})

Racing
- Class association: MORC
- PHRF: 159

The Olson 25 is a recreational keelboat designed as a one design and Midget Ocean Racing Club racer-cruiser. It was initially built by Pacific Boat Works in 1984 and later by Ericson Yachts in the United States, with 130 boats completed by 1989. It is now out of production.

== Design ==
Built predominantly of fiberglass, it has a masthead sloop rig, a raked stem, a reverse transom, an internally mounted spade-type rudder controlled by a tiller and a fixed fin keel. It displaces 2,900 lb (1,315 kg) and carries 1,300 lb (590 kg) of ballast.

The boat has a draft of 4.50 ft (1.37 m) with the standard fin keel.

The boat is normally fitted with a small 3 to 6 hp (2 to 4 kW) outboard motor for docking and maneuvering.

The design has sleeping accommodation for four people, with a double "V"-berth in the bow cabin and two straight settee berths in the main cabin. The galley is located on the port side just aft of the bow cabin and is equipped with a two-burner stove. The head is located just aft of the bow cabin on the starboard side underneath a seat cushion. Cabin headroom is 56 in (142 cm).

For sailing downwind the design may be equipped with a symmetrical spinnaker.

The design has a PHRF racing average handicap of 159 and a hull speed of 6.2 kn (11.5 km/h).

== Reception ==
In a 2010 review Steve Henkel wrote, "this boat was designed and built in Santa Cruz, CA, a hotbed of sailboat innovation tucked along the shore of Monterey Bay on the Pacific Ocean. George Olson, owner of Pacific Boats, wanted to create a boat that would fast, rate well under MORC rules, look good, and be comfortable. It needed to be light in weight, but not necessarily in the extreme. When this boat came along in 1985, Santa Cruz was the center of ULDB activity. ULDB stands for Ultra Light Displacement Boat, meaning a D/L under 100. With a D/L of 135, the Olson 25 is more manageable in light air than she would have been as a strictly conceived ULDB. She was popular as a PHRF and one-design racer, especially in the Monterey Bay area, but in the downward economy, which came shortly after her introduction, business suffered, and eventually Ericson began building her until that firm too went by the wayside. Best features: An open stern makes the transom-mounted outboard engine easier to manage. A nice finish below includes Bruynzeel plywood with satin finished regina mahogany veneer, and a teak and holly cabin sole. The companionway step can do double duty as a cocktail table. A bench seat athwartships between twin Igloo coolers is a unique and handy arrangement. Worst features: None identified."

A 2010 Sail Magazine review described the boat as, "a sporty classic [that] offers the opportunity to go back to the basics on the race course".
