= MacGregor 24 =

Sailboat class

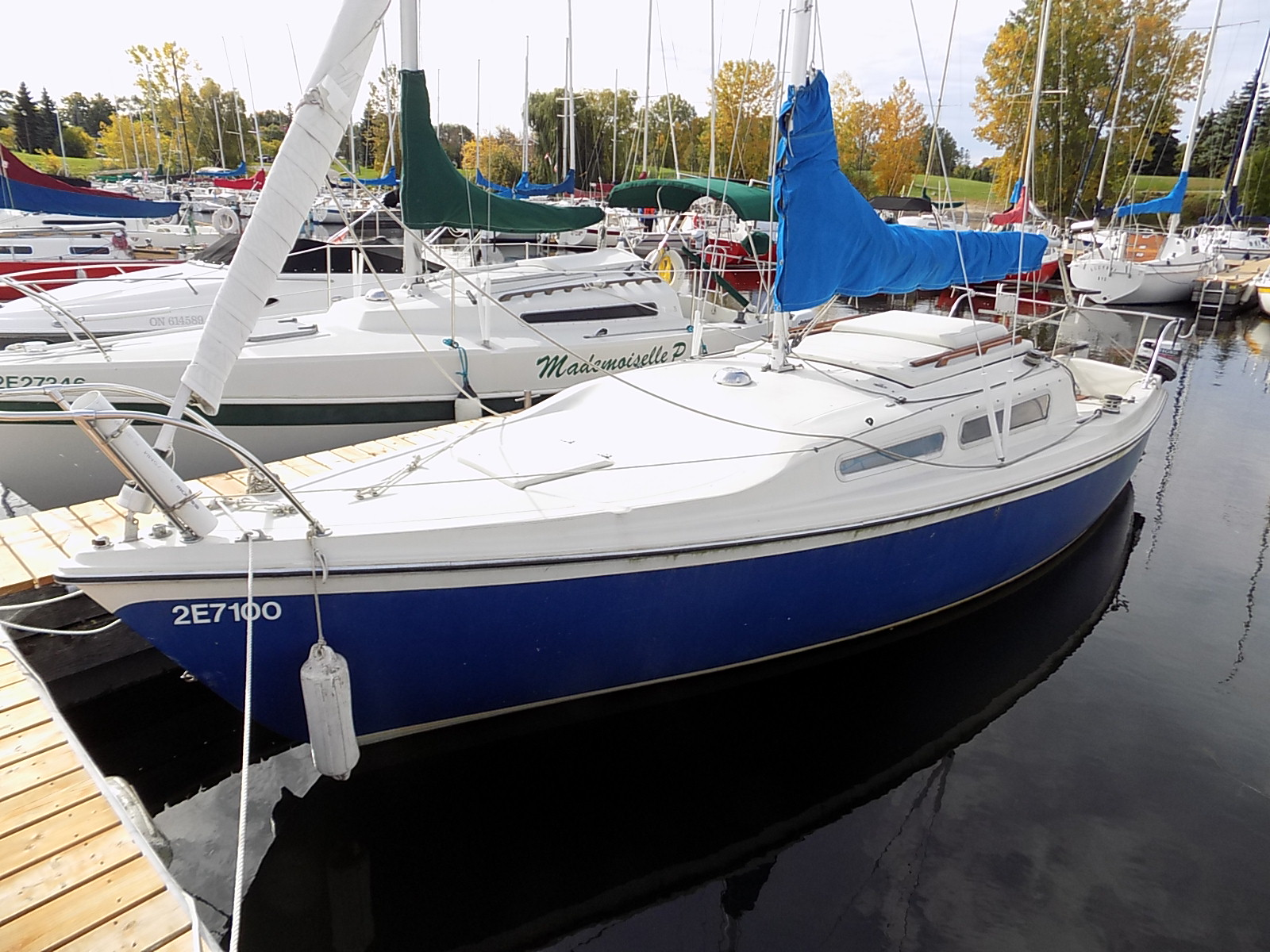

Development
- Designer: Roger MacGregor
- Location: United States
- Year: 1971
- Builder: MacGregor Yacht Corporation
- Name: MacGregor 24

Boat
- Displacement: 2,100 lb (953 kg)
- Draft: 5.00 ft (1.52 m) with the centerboard down

Hull
- Type: Monohull
- Construction: Fiberglass
- LOA: 24.58 ft (7.49 m)
- LWL: 21.33 ft (6.50 m)
- Beam: 7.92 ft (2.41 m)
- Engine: Outboard motor

Hull appendages
- Keel: centerboard
- Ballast: 575 lb (261 kg)
- Rudder: transom-mounted rudder

Rig
- Rig type: Bermuda rig

Sails
- Sailplan: Fractional rigged sloop
- Total sail area: 231 sq ft (21.5 m^{2})

The MacGregor 24 is an American trailerable sailboat that was designed by Roger MacGregor and first built in 1971.

== Production ==
The design was built by the MacGregor Yacht Corporation in the United States, but it is now out of production.

== Design ==
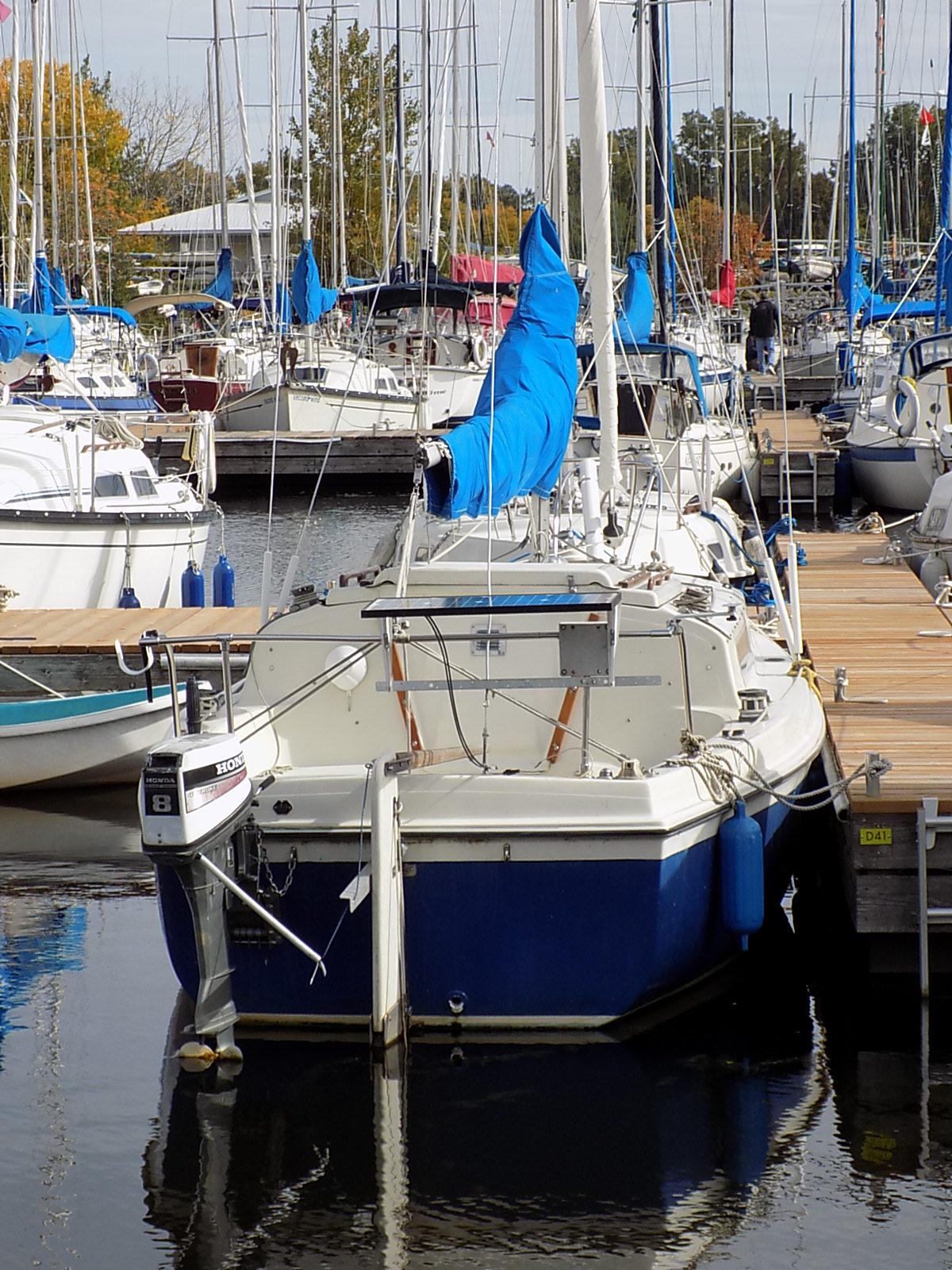
Transom view of a MacGregor 24

The MacGregor 24 is a small recreational keelboat, built predominantly of fiberglass, with wood trim. It has a fractional sloop, a raked stem, a vertical transom, a transom-hung rudder controlled by a tiller and a retractable centerboard type keel. It displaces 2,100 lb (953 kg) and carries 575 lb (261 kg) of ballast.

The boat has a draft of 5.00 ft (1.52 m) with the centreboard extended and 1.50 ft (0.46 m) with it retracted, allowing beaching or ground transportation on a trailer.

The boat is normally fitted with a small outboard motor for docking and maneuvering.

The design has a hull speed of 6.19 kn (11.46 km/h).
