= Challenger 24 =

Sailboat class

Development
- Designer: Alex McGruer
- Location: Canada
- Year: 1973
- Builder: Challenger Yachts
- Name: Challenger 24

Boat
- Displacement: 4,000 lb (1,814 kg)
- Draft: 3.42 ft (1.04 m)

Hull
- Type: Monohull
- Construction: Fibreglass
- LOA: 24.33 ft (7.42 m)
- LWL: 22.17 ft (6.76 m)
- Beam: 8.17 ft (2.49 m)
- Engine: Outboard motor

Hull appendages
- Keel: fin keel
- Ballast: 2,090 lb (948 kg)
- Rudder: internally-mounted spade-type rudder

Rig
- Rig type: Bermuda rig
- I foretriangle height: 30.00 ft (9.14 m)
- J foretriangle base: 9.30 ft (2.83 m)
- P mainsail luff: 24.40 ft (7.44 m)
- E mainsail foot: 9.30 ft (2.83 m)

Sails
- Sailplan: Masthead sloop
- Mainsail area: 113.46 sq ft (10.541 m^{2})
- Jib/genoa area: 139.50 sq ft (12.960 m^{2})
- Total sail area: 252.96 sq ft (23.501 m^{2})

The Challenger 24 is a Canadian sailboat that was designed by Alex McGruer and first built in 1973.

== Production ==
The design was built by Challenger Yachts in Canada, but it is now out of production.

== Design ==
The Challenger 24 is a recreational keelboat, built predominantly of fibreglass, with wood trim. It has a masthead sloop rig, a raked stem, a vertical transom, an internally mounted spade-type rudder controlled by a tiller and a fixed fin keel. It displaces 4,000 lb (1,814 kg) and carries 2,090 lb (948 kg) of ballast.

The boat has a draft of 3.42 ft (1.04 m) with the standard keel fitted.

The boat is normally fitted with a small outboard motor for docking and maneuvering, although the design originally specified an inboard Renault diesel engine.

The accommodation includes a forward "V"-berth, a semi-private head, a convertible dinette table that can be used as a berth and a quarter-berth aft.

In a review Michael McGoldrick wrote, "it is one of those sailboats which attempts to provide full standing headroom in the cabin for the least possible money. It may not be the best built, or nicest looking, or the fastest sailboat around, but it's probably one of the least expensive model that can be found on the used market with standing headroom."

== Variants ==
Challenger 7.4 and 7.5
Model built from 1974 to 1980, with 800 examples completed. Otherwise similar to the Challenger 24.
