= Achilles 24 =

Sailboat class

Development
- Designer: Oliver Lee and Chris Butler
- Location: United Kingdom
- Year: 1968
- No. built: 600
- Builder: Butler Moldings
- Name: Achilles 24

Boat
- Displacement: 2,600 lb (1,179 kg)
- Draft: 3.75 ft (1.14 m)

Hull
- Type: Monohull
- Construction: Fiberglass
- LOA: 23.75 ft (7.24 m)
- LWL: 19.50 ft (5.94 m)
- Beam: 7.09 ft (2.16 m)
- Engine: diesel or gasoline inboard engine or outboard motor

Hull appendages
- Keel: fin keel
- Ballast: 1,314 lb (596 kg)
- Rudder: Skeg-mounted rudder

Rig
- Rig type: Bermuda rig
- I foretriangle height: 25.75 ft (7.85 m)
- J foretriangle base: 7.67 ft (2.34 m)
- P mainsail luff: 22.25 ft (6.78 m)
- E mainsail foot: 10.00 ft (3.05 m)

Sails
- Sailplan: Masthead sloop
- Mainsail area: 111.25 sq ft (10.335 m^{2})
- Jib/genoa area: 98.75 sq ft (9.174 m^{2})
- Total sail area: 210.00 sq ft (19.510 m^{2})

The Achilles 24 is a British sailboat that was designed by Oliver Lee and Chris Butler as a cruiser-racer and first built in 1968.

The Achilles 24 is a development of the open Ajax.

== Production ==
The design was built by Butler Moldings in the United Kingdom, but it is now out of production. A number of boats were also constructed by amateur builders from kits supplied by Butler.

== Design ==
The Achilles 24 is a recreational keelboat, built predominantly of fiberglass, with teak wood trim. It has a masthead sloop rig, with a deck-stepped mast, a spooned raked stem, a vertical transom, a skeg-mounted rudder controlled by a tiller and a fixed fin keel or optional triple keel. It displaces 2,600 lb (1,179 kg) and carries 1,314 lb (596 kg) of ballast.

The boat has a draft of 3.75 ft (1.14 m) with the standard keel and 3.51 ft (1.07 m) with the optional shoal draft triple keel. The triple keel allows beaching the boat in an upright position. The manufacturer claims that the triple keel only exacts a 3% performance penalty. However Yachting Monthly magazine reported in 2009, "Butler competed in AZAB and OSTAR races in the Achilles 24, which featured a bulbed fin keel. This gave the boat quite respectable speed and windward performance but a triple-keeled, shoal draught version was much more pedestrian."

The boat was initially fitted with a small outboard motor, with an inboard gasoline engine optional for docking and maneuvering. Many were retro-fitted with diesel engines. The fresh water tank has a capacity of 20 U.S. gallons (76 L; 17 imp gal).

Early production boats had three cabin windows, but this was later changed to a single long window.

Accommodations in the narrow-beam boat include two quarter berths and a forward "V"-berth, with a chemical head under the "V"-berth. It has a split galley, with a port side double sink and a starboard side two-burner stove. An anchor well is provide in the bow on boats after about serial number 250.

The design has a hull speed of 5.92 kn (10.96 km/h).

The designer, Butler, raced the boat in the Azores and Back (AZAB) Yacht Race and Observer Single-handed Trans-Atlantic Race (OSTAR) races.

In a 2009 review, Yachting Monthly magazine said, "factory-built boats were sound, strong but simple. The quality of the many home-built models will be variable."
