= Precision 16 =

Sailboat class

Development
- Designer: Stephen Seaton
- Location: United States
- Year: 1982
- No. built: 64 (1994)
- Builder: Precision Boat Works
- Name: Precision 16

Boat
- Displacement: 390 lb (177 kg)
- Draft: 3.67 ft (1.12 m) with centerboard down

Hull
- Type: Monohull
- Construction: Fiberglass
- LOA: 16.25 ft (4.95 m)
- LWL: 14.00 ft (4.27 m)
- Beam: 6.67 ft (2.03 m)

Hull appendages
- Keel: centerboard
- Rudder: transom-mounted rudder

Rig
- Rig type: Bermuda rig

Sails
- Sailplan: Fractional rigged sloop
- Mainsail area: 97 sq ft (9.0 m^{2})
- Jib/genoa area: 58 sq ft (5.4 m^{2})
- Spinnaker area: 162 sq ft (15.1 m^{2})
- Total sail area: 155 sq ft (14.4 m^{2})

Racing
- D-PN: 100.1

The Precision 16 is an American sailing dinghy that was designed by Stephen Seaton and first built in 1982.

== Production ==
The design was built by Precision Boat Works in Palmetto, Florida, United States, starting in 1982, but it is now out of production. A total of 64 examples of the type were reported as having been completed by 1994.

== Design ==
The Precision 16 is a recreational sailboat, built predominantly of fiberglass, with teak wood trim. It has a fractional sloop rig with aluminum spars. The double hull has a raked stem, a plumb transom and a retractable centerboard. The a transom-hung, kick-up rudder has an aluminum head that is controlled by a tiller. Both the rudder and centerboard are made from foam-cored fiberglass. The boat is open and has no foredeck, although it has two stowage compartments. It displaces 390 lb (177 kg) and is equipped with 10 cu ft (0.28 m^{3}) of foam for flotation.

The boat has a draft of 3.67 ft (1.12 m) with the centerboard extended and 8 in (20 cm) with it retracted, allowing beaching or ground transportation on a trailer.

For sailing the design is equipped with a self-bailing cockpit. The mainsail boom has the mainsheet rigged for mid-boom sheeting.

The design has a Portsmouth Yardstick racing average handicap of 100.1 and is normally raced with a crew of two sailors.

== Operational history ==
In a 1994 review Richard Sherwood noted that the boat was only sold in Florida. He also remarked on its planing capabilities.

== See also ==
- List of sailing boat types
