= Precision 13 =

Sailboat class

Development
- Designer: Stephen Seaton
- Location: United States
- Year: 1985
- Builder: Precision Boat Works
- Role: Racer

Boat
- Crew: one
- Displacement: 140 lb (64 kg)
- Draft: 2.67 ft (0.81 m)

Hull
- Type: monohull
- Construction: fiberglass
- LOA: 13.16 ft (4.01 m)
- LWL: 12.16 ft (3.71 m)
- Beam: 4.67 ft (1.42 m)

Hull appendages
- Keel: daggerboard
- Rudder: transom-mounted rudder

Rig
- Rig type: Cat rig

Sails
- Sailplan: Catboat
- Mainsail area: 85.00 sq ft (7.897 m^{2})

The Precision 13 is an American single-handed sailing dinghy that was designed by Stephen Seaton as a racer and first built in 1985.

== Production ==
The design was built by Precision Boat Works in Palmetto, Florida, United States, starting in 1985, but it is now out of production.

== Design ==
The Precision 13 is a recreational sailboat, built predominantly of fiberglass, with aluminum spars. It has a catboat rig, a raked stem, a plumb transom, a transom-hung rudder controlled by a tiller and a retractable daggerboard. It displaces 140 lb (64 kg).

The boat has a draft of 2.67 ft (0.81 m) with the daggerboard extended and 0.33 ft (0.10 m) with it retracted, allowing operation in shallow water, beaching or ground transportation on a trailer or car rooftop.

== See also ==
- List of sailing boat types

Similar sailboats

- Laser (dinghy)
