= Precision 23 =

Popular American trailer sailer

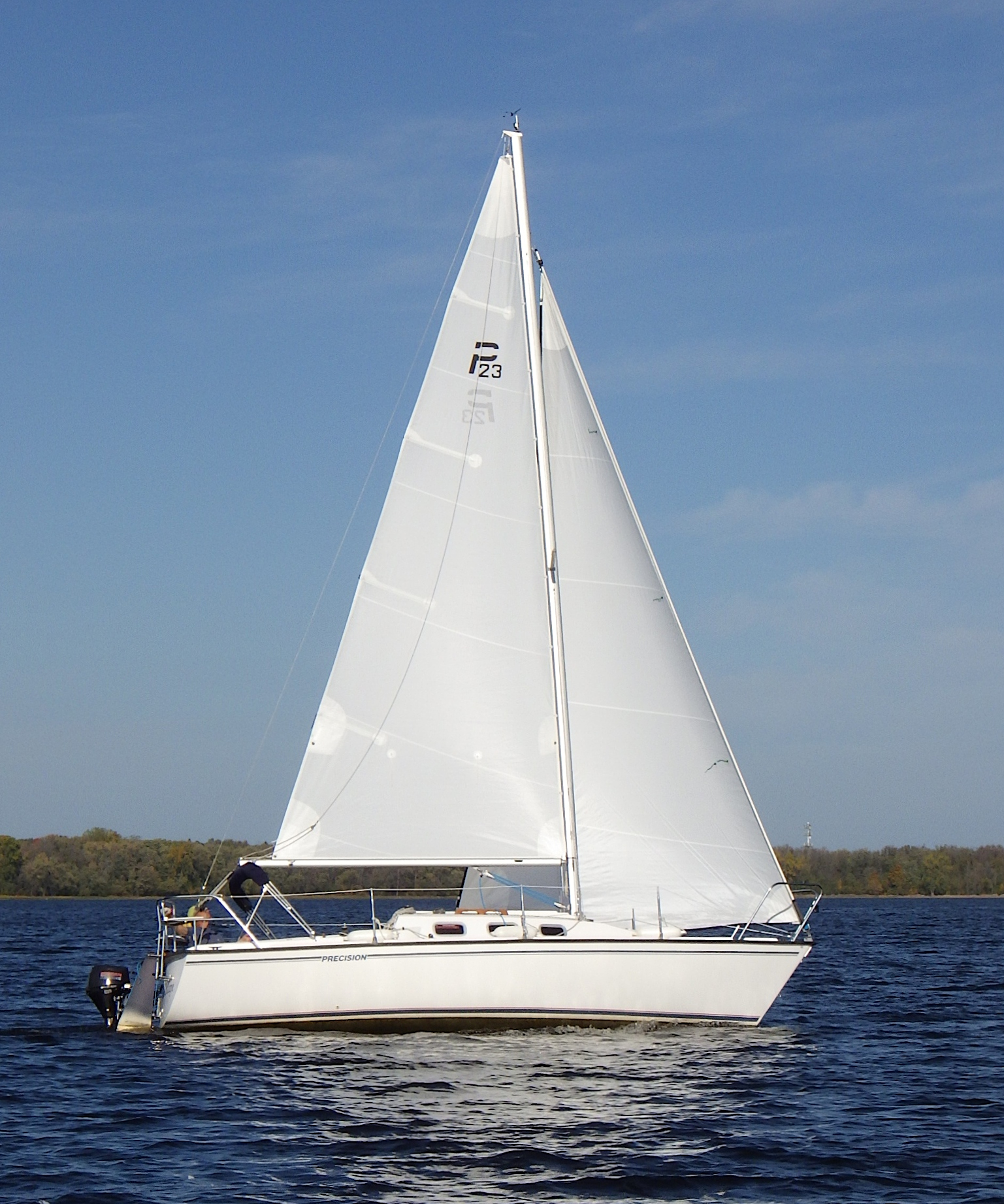

Development
- Designer: Jim Taylor
- Location: United States
- Year: 1986
- No. built: more than 500
- Builder: Precision Boat Works
- Name: Precision 23

Boat
- Displacement: 2,450 lb (1,111 kg)
- Draft: 5.33 ft (1.62 m) with centerboard down

Hull
- Type: Monohull
- Construction: Fiberglass
- LOA: 23.42 ft (7.14 m)
- LWL: 20.00 ft (6.10 m)
- Beam: 8.50 ft (2.59 m)
- Engine: Outboard motor

Hull appendages
- Keel: stub keel with centerboard
- Ballast: 850 lb (386 kg)
- Rudder: transom-mounted rudder

Rig
- General: Fractional rigged sloop
- I foretriangle height: 26.25 ft (8.00 m)
- J foretriangle base: 8.33 ft (2.54 m)
- P mainsail luff: 26.25 ft (8.00 m)
- E mainsail foot: 10.50 ft (3.20 m)

Sails
- Mainsail area: 137.81 sq ft (12.803 m^{2})
- Jib/genoa area: 109.33 sq ft (10.157 m^{2})
- Total sail area: 247.14 sq ft (22.960 m^{2})

Racing
- PHRF: 228

The Precision 23 is an American trailerable sailboat that was designed by Jim Taylor.

== Production ==
The boat was first built by Precision Boat Works in the United States in 1986 and remained in production until 2018. Over 500 examples were completed.

== Design ==
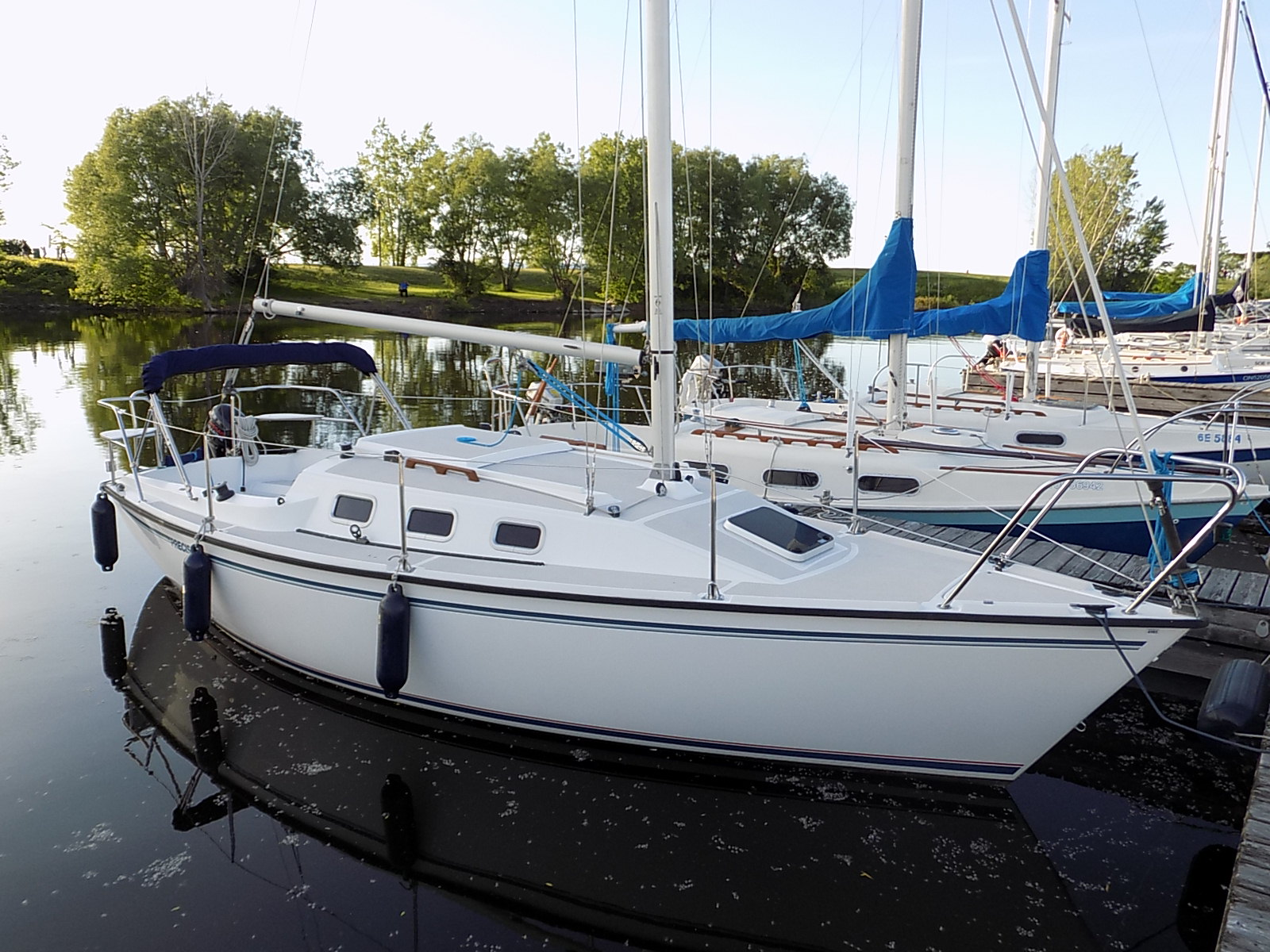
Precision 23

The Precision 23 is a small recreational keelboat, built predominantly of fiberglass, with teak wood trim. It has a fractional sloop rig, a transom-hung rudder and a fixed stub keel with a retractable centerboard that is raised and lowered by a Dacron line, plus a "kick-up" rudder. It displaces 2,450 lb (1,111 kg) and carries 850 lb (386 kg) of lead ballast. The cockpit is 83 in (2.11 m) long.

The boat is constructed using a hand-laid fiberglassing method and sleeps four adults. The galley includes a stainless steel sink, an alcohol-fired stove and a self-contained fresh water system, with a manual pump. A 48 US qt (45 L) Igloo Coolers ice chest with a teak wood step is also standard equipment.

The boat has a draft of 5.33 ft (1.62 m) with the fiberglass centerboard extended and 1.93 ft (0.59 m) with it retracted, allowing beaching or ground transportation on a trailer.

The boat is normally fitted with a small 3 to 6 hp (2 to 4 kW) outboard motor for docking and maneuvering.

The design has sleeping accommodation for five people, with a double "V"-berth in the bow cabin, two straight settees in the main cabin and an aft quarter berth on the port side. The galley is located on the starboard side just behind the companionway ladder. The galley is equipped with a two-burner stove and a sink. The head is located under the bow cabin "V"-berth. Cabin headroom is 54 in (137 cm).

The design has a PHRF racing average handicap of 228 and a hull speed of 5.99 kn (11.09 km/h).

== Operational history ==
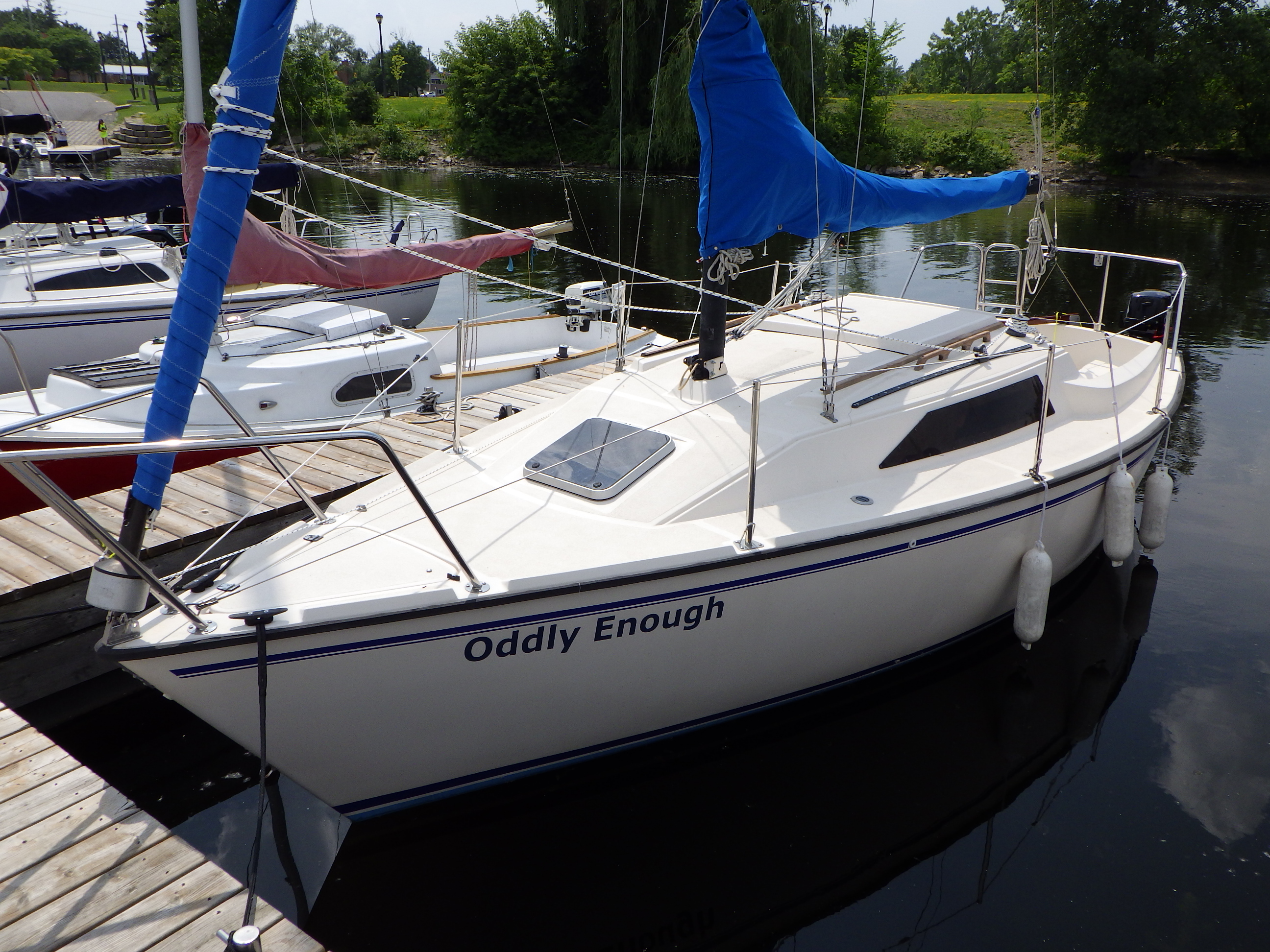
Precision 23 with alternate port installation

In a 2010 review Steve Henkel wrote, "In 1994, former Precision sales manager, the late Larry Norris, gave me his own description of the traditional, shoal-draft Precision 23 when I was writing a review of the boat for Practical Sailor. He said that 'the 23 has never been anything it wasn't originally intended to be: a trailerable sailboat of better than average cruising performance, but never a racing machine. It is too full forward and cut away aft to achieve really staggering downwind performance. But on the other hand, the boat will stay balanced in a blow with just a couple of fingers on the tiller.' Our tests at the time bore out his assertions. Best features: Attractive traditional design, solid construction, adequately stable and weatherly, open and airy cabin with better-than-average space ... good and caring customer service, and a well-satisfied and loyal owner group. Worst features: Nothing significant to report."

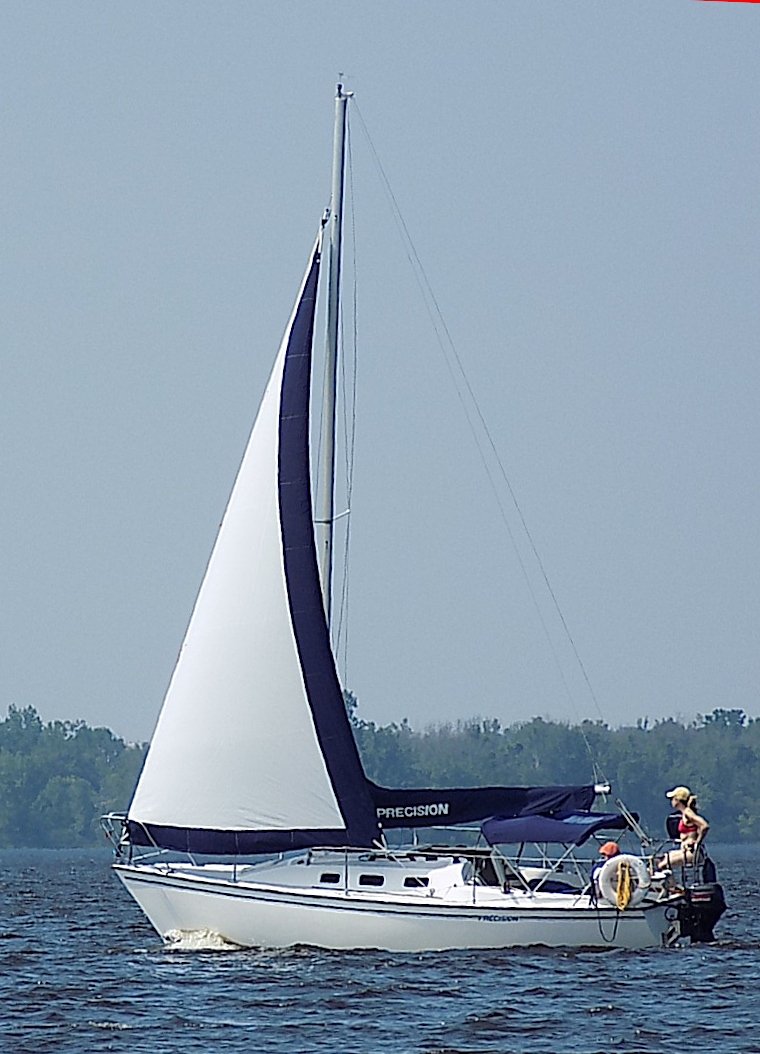
Precision 23
