= Precision 15 =

Sailboat class

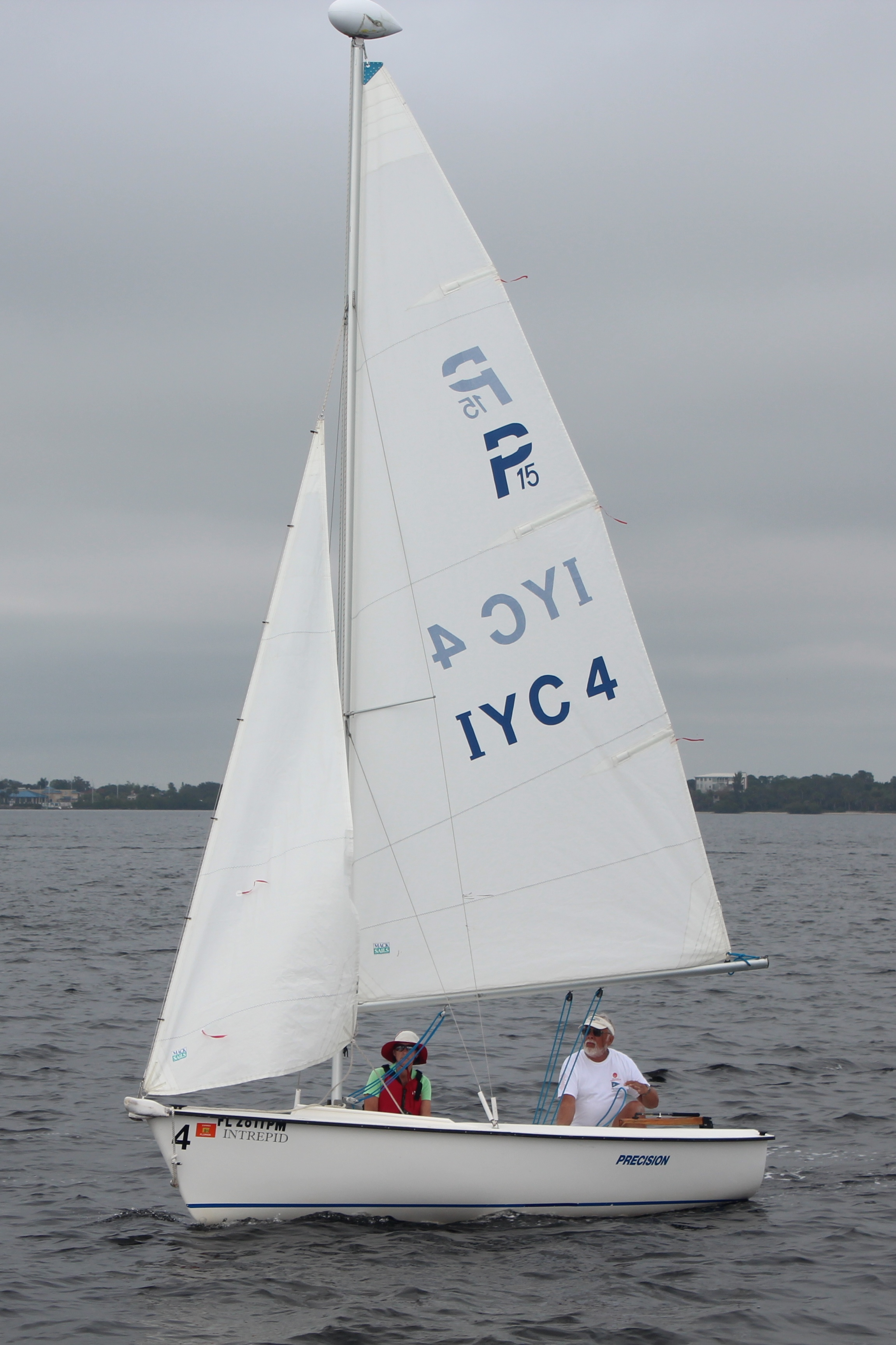

Development
- Designer: Jim Taylor
- Location: United States
- Year: 1995
- No. built: 800 (CB and K models combined)
- Builder: Precision Boat Works
- Name: Precision 15

Boat
- Displacement: 600 lb (272 kg)
- Draft: 1.75 ft (0.53 m) with centerboard down

Hull
- Type: Monohull
- Construction: Fiberglass
- LOA: 15.00 ft (4.57 m)
- LWL: 13.75 ft (4.19 m)
- Beam: 7.00 ft (2.13 m)

Hull appendages
- Keel: fin keel
- Ballast: 250 lb (113 kg)
- Rudder: transom-mounted rudder

Rig
- Rig type: Bermuda rig
- I foretriangle height: 15.20 ft (4.63 m)
- J foretriangle base: 4.70 ft (1.43 m)
- P mainsail luff: 18.30 ft (5.58 m)
- E mainsail foot: 8.90 ft (2.71 m)

Sails
- Sailplan: Fractional rigged sloop
- Mainsail area: 81.44 sq ft (7.566 m^{2})
- Jib/genoa area: 35.72 sq ft (3.318 m^{2})
- Total sail area: 117.16 sq ft (10.885 m^{2})

The Precision 15, also called the Precision 15 K (for keel), is an American trailerable sailboat, that was designed by Jim Taylor and first built in 1995.

A sailing dinghy version with a centerboard and no ballast was also built and designated the Precision 15 CB.

== Production ==
The design was built by Precision Boat Works in Palmetto, Florida, United States from 1995 to 2018. More than 800 examples of both models were produced.

== Design ==
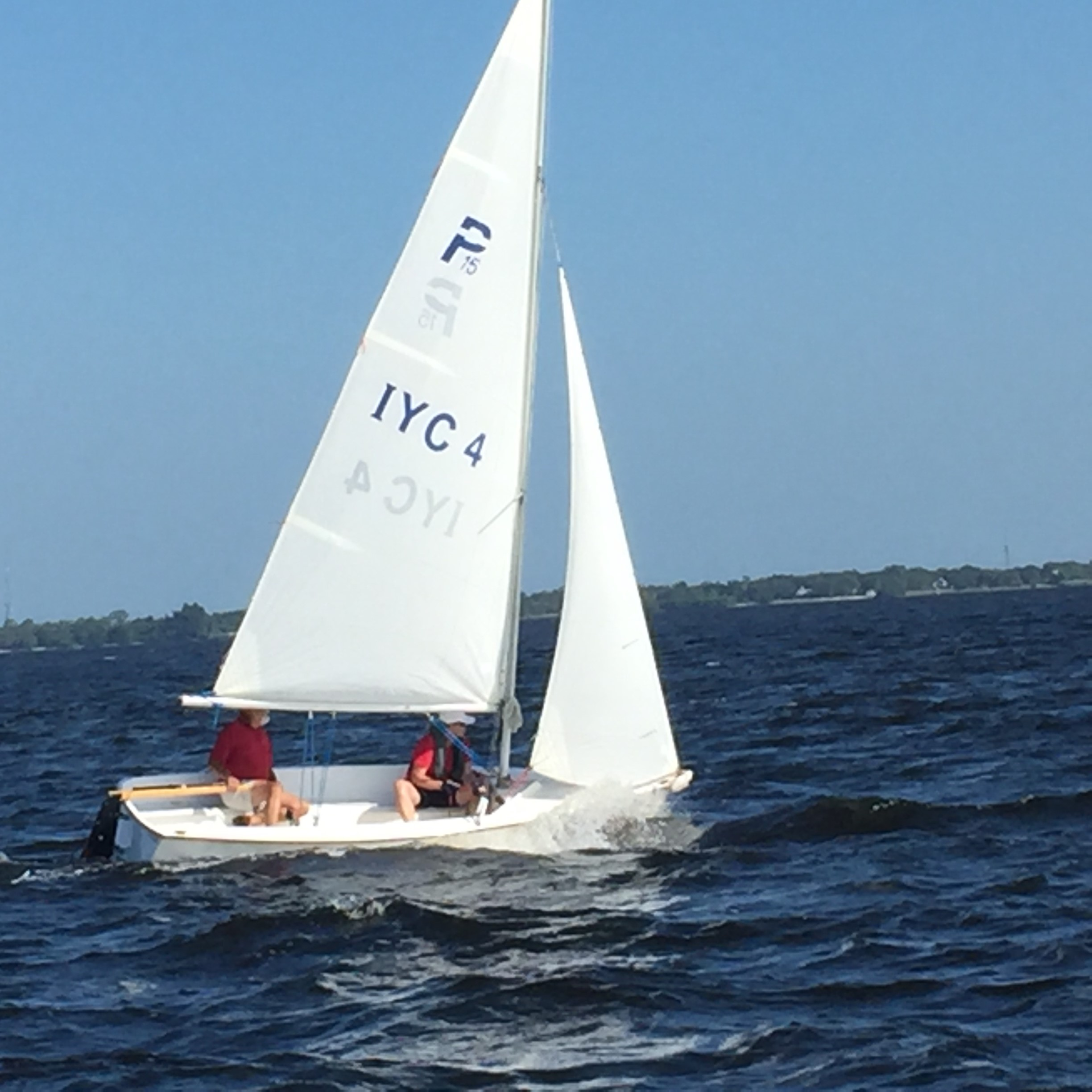
Precision 15

The Precision 15 is a recreational keelboat, built predominantly of fiberglass, with a vinyl ester resin skin coat. It has a fractional sloop rig with anodized aluminum spars and a hinged mast step. The hull has a raked stem, a plumb transom, a transom-hung, kick-up rudder controlled by a wooden tiller, with a tiller extension and a fixed keel. The boat has foam flotation, a boom vang and jib tracks.

The design displaces 600 lb (272 kg) and carries 250 lb (113 kg) of ballast. The boat has a draft of 1.75 ft (0.53 m), enabling ground transportation on a trailer.

The manufacturer lists the boat's design goals as "safety, stability, reliable handling, and sprightly speed under sail".

An optional mount may be fitted for a small outboard motor for docking and maneuvering.

== Operational history ==
In a 2003 review of the Precision 15 K by naval architect Robert Perry, he wrote, "the target market for this boat could be family day-sailing, but the 15 would also make a very nice trainer. The hull is broad enough to provide stability without acrobatics. At 600 pounds the boat is also light enough to be fast and responsive. The broad and flattish sections aft mean that the 15 will be stable off the wind in a breeze. In light air you can move crew weight forward and get the tail out of the water to reduce wetted surface. The keel is a bulb-end plate-type with a draft of only 1 foot, 8 inches. The rudder is considerably deeper than the keel. I'd like to see a deeper keel, but I realize that Taylor and Precision have become very adept at doing these minimal-draft appendages."

== See also ==
- List of sailing boat types
