= Precision 185 =

2001–2018 US recreational keelboat

Development
- Designer: Jim Taylor
- Location: United States
- Year: 2001
- Builder: Precision Boat Works
- Role: Day sailer
- Name: Precision 185

Boat
- Displacement: 880 lb (399 kg)
- Draft: 3.50 ft (1.07 m)

Hull
- Type: monohull
- Construction: fiberglass
- LOA: 18.42 ft (5.61 m)
- LWL: 16.67 ft (5.08 m)
- Beam: 7.33 ft (2.23 m)

Hull appendages
- Keel: fin keel
- Ballast: 375 lb (170 kg)
- Rudder: transom-mounted rudder

Rig
- Rig type: Bermuda rig
- I foretriangle height: 18.70 ft (5.70 m)
- J foretriangle base: 6.10 ft (1.86 m)
- P mainsail luff: 21.50 ft (6.55 m)
- E mainsail foot: 9.00 ft (2.74 m)

Sails
- Sailplan: fractional rigged sloop
- Mainsail area: 96.75 sq ft (8.988 m^{2})
- Jib/genoa area: 57.04 sq ft (5.299 m^{2})
- Total sail area: 96.75 sq ft (8.988 m^{2})

The Precision 185 is a recreational keelboat built by Precision Boat Works in Palmetto, Florida, United States, between 2001 and 2018.

The fiberglass hull has a fractional sloop rig, a raked stem, an open plumb transom, a transom-hung rudder controlled by a tiller and a fixed fin keel.

It has a hull speed of 5.47 kn (10.13 km/h).

There is also a centerboard sailing dinghy derivative of the design, the Precision 185 CB.
