= Precision 21 =

Recreational keelboat

Development
- Designer: Jim Taylor
- Location: United States
- Year: 1986
- Builder: Precision Boat Works
- Role: Cruiser

Boat
- Displacement: 1,875 lb (850 kg)
- Draft: 4.67 ft (1.42 m) with centerboard down

Hull
- Type: monohull
- Construction: fiberglass
- LOA: 20.75 ft (6.32 m)
- LWL: 17.50 ft (5.33 m)
- Beam: 8.25 ft (2.51 m)
- Engine: outboard motor

Hull appendages
- Keel: stub keel and centerboard
- Ballast: 600 lb (272 kg)
- Rudder: transom-mounted rudder

Rig
- Rig type: Bermuda rig
- I foretriangle height: 22.70 ft (6.92 m)
- J foretriangle base: 7.00 ft (2.13 m)
- P mainsail luff: 23.70 ft (7.22 m)
- E mainsail foot: 9.50 ft (2.90 m)

Sails
- Sailplan: fractional rigged sloop
- Mainsail area: 112.58 sq ft (10.459 m^{2})
- Jib/genoa area: 79.45 sq ft (7.381 m^{2})
- Total sail area: 192.03 sq ft (17.840 m^{2})

Racing
- PHRF: 270

The Precision 21 is a fractional sloop rigged trailer sailer built by Precision Boat Works in Palmetto, Florida, from 1986 until 2018.

== Design ==
Designed by Jim Taylor, the fiberglass hull has a raked stem, a plumb transom, a transom-hung rudder controlled by a tiller and a fixed stub keel with a retractable centerboard that has a NACA airfoil profile. It displaces 1,875 lb (850 kg) and carries 600 lb (272 kg) of ballast.

The boat has a draft of 4.67 ft (1.42 m) with the centerboard extended and 1.75 ft (0.53 m) with it retracted, allowing operation in shallow water, or ground transportation on a trailer.

The boat is normally fitted with a small 3 to 6 hp (2 to 4 kW) outboard motor for docking and maneuvering.

The design has sleeping accommodation for four people, with a double "V"-berth in the bow cabin and two straight settee berths in the main cabin. The galley is located on the port side just aft of the bow cabin. The galley is equipped with a stove and a sink. The head is located in the bow cabin under the "V"-berth. Cabin headroom is 52 in (132 cm).

The design has a PHRF racing average handicap of 270 and a hull speed of 5.6 kn (10.4 km/h).

In a 1987 review in Cruising World by Dan Spurr and Herb McCormick named the design the winner in the "tidy little trailerable category" and noted that the boat is "simple and straightforward, the boat should be a blast to sail and a comfortable place to enjoy the surroundings when the day's trip is through."

In a 2010 review Steve Henkel wrote, "designer Jim Taylor ... draws a nice boat, and the Precision 21 is no exception. Furthermore, Precision Boatworks ... does a good job of molding and finishing these boats. Best features: With her big beam, 4' 4" headroom, and well-designed layout, she seems to have plenty of space below ... We think this makes her, more than her comp[etitor]s, what used to be called a 'wholesome' weekend boat for a family of two adults and one or two children. Her draft ... beats most of her comp[etitor]s by a wide margin when it comes to easy ramp launching. Workmanship on her hull, on the boats we've seen, is well above average. Worst features: At one time owners had trouble with the centerboard and leaking windows, but these problems were eventually recognized at the factory and as we understand it, the board and leak problems were corrected in succeeding production."
