= Precision 185 CB =

Sailboat class

Development
- Designer: Jim Taylor
- Location: United States
- Year: 2001
- Builder: Precision Boat Works
- Role: Day sailer
- Name: Precision 185 CB

Boat
- Displacement: 590 lb (268 kg)
- Draft: 4.83 ft (1.47 m) with centerboard down

Hull
- Type: monohull
- Construction: fiberglass
- LOA: 18.42 ft (5.61 m)
- LWL: 16.67 ft (5.08 m)
- Beam: 7.33 ft (2.23 m)

Hull appendages
- Keel: centerboard
- Rudder: transom-mounted rudder

Rig
- Rig type: Bermuda rig
- I foretriangle height: 18.70 ft (5.70 m)
- J foretriangle base: 6.10 ft (1.86 m)
- P mainsail luff: 21.50 ft (6.55 m)
- E mainsail foot: 9.00 ft (2.74 m)

Sails
- Sailplan: fractional rigged sloop
- Mainsail area: 96.75 sq ft (8.988 m^{2})
- Jib/genoa area: 57.04 sq ft (5.299 m^{2})
- Total sail area: 96.75 sq ft (8.988 m^{2})

The Precision 185 CB is an American sailing dinghy that was designed by Jim Taylor as a day sailer and first built in 2001.

The design was named 2003 Sailing World's Boat of the Year.

There is also a keel version of the design, the Precision 185.

== Production ==
The design was built by Precision Boat Works in Palmetto, Florida, United States, between 2001 and 2018, but it is now out of production.

== Design ==
The Precision 185 CB is a recreational sailboat, built predominantly of fiberglass, with wood trim. It has a fractional sloop rig, a raked stem, an open plumb transom, a transom-hung rudder controlled by a tiller and a retractable centerboard. It displaces 590 lb (268 kg).

The boat has a draft of 4.83 ft (1.47 m) with the centerboard extended and 6 in (15 cm) with it retracted, allowing operation in shallow water, beaching or ground transportation on a trailer.

For sailing downwind the design may be equipped with a symmetrical spinnaker. Hiking straps are also optional.

== Operational history ==
In a 2002 review Alan Andrews wrote, "the Precision 185 was voted Best Value for its combination of good sailing characteristics, substantial construction, and reasonable cost. First and foremost this boat performs well; yet it shouldn't intimidate even entry-level sailors."

== See also ==
- List of sailing boat types
