= Precision 18 =

Popular US trailer sailer

Development
- Designer: Jim Taylor
- Location: United States
- Year: 1984
- No. built: 500
- Builder: Precision Boat Works
- Role: Cruiser
- Name: Precision 18

Boat
- Displacement: 1,100 lb (499 kg)
- Draft: 4.25 ft (1.30 m) with centerboard extended

Hull
- Type: monohull
- Construction: fiberglass
- LOA: 17.42 ft (5.31 m)
- LWL: 15.42 ft (4.70 m)
- Beam: 7.42 ft (2.26 m)
- Engine: outboard motor

Hull appendages
- Keel: stub keel with centerboard
- Ballast: 350 lb (159 kg)
- Rudder: transom-mounted rudder

Rig
- Rig type: Bermuda rig
- I foretriangle height: 19.00 ft (5.79 m)
- J foretriangle base: 5.50 ft (1.68 m)
- P mainsail luff: 20.00 ft (6.10 m)
- E mainsail foot: 8.25 ft (2.51 m)

Sails
- Sailplan: fractional rigged sloop
- Mainsail area: 82.50 sq ft (7.665 m^{2})
- Jib/genoa area: 52.25 sq ft (4.854 m^{2})
- Total sail area: 134.75 sq ft (12.519 m^{2})

Racing
- PHRF: 275

The Precision 18 is an American trailerable sailboat that was first built in 1984 and designed by Jim Taylor as a cruiser

== Production ==
The design was built by Precision Boat Works in Palmetto, Florida, United States from 1984 until 2018, with 500 boats completed.

== Design ==
The Precision 18 is a recreational keelboat, built predominantly of fiberglass, with wood trim. It has a fractional sloop rig, a raked stem, a plumb transom, a transom-hung, kick-up rudder controlled by a tiller and a fixed stub keel, with a NACA airfoil 68 lb (31 kg) fiberglass centerboard that retracts into the keel. It displaces 1,100 lb (499 kg) and carries 350 lb (159 kg) of lead ballast.

Early boats produced have a single non-opening port on each cabin side, whereas later production models have two opening ports per side.

The boat has a draft of 4.25 ft (1.30 m) with the centerboard extended and 1.50 ft (0.46 m) with it retracted, allowing operation in shallow water or ground transportation on a trailer.

The boat is normally fitted with a small 3 to 6 hp (2 to 4 kW) outboard motor for docking and maneuvering.

The design has sleeping accommodation for four people, with a double "V"-berth in the bow cabin and two straight settee berths in the main cabin. There are no galley provisions, nor a table provided, but there is a 40 US qt (38 L) cooler. The head is located on the port side, amidships, under the settee. Cabin headroom is 48 in (122 cm).

The design has a PHRF racing average handicap of 275 and a hull speed of 5.3 kn (9.8 km/h).

== Operational history ==
In a 2010 review Steve Henkel wrote, "this is an attractive, well built modern trailer-sailer with a keel-housed centerboard—what used to be called a "wholesome" boat. Below is a 40-quart cooler, and a space for a porta-pottie, but no sink, stove, or table ... Best features: Solid, neatly laid-up construction, good attention to detail ... Worst features: The basic boat comes without boom vang, backstay tensioner, reefing lines led back to the cockpit for easy singlehanding, and other small conveniences. For example, the end-boom mainsheet tackle is attached to a fitting on the backstay, an awkward reach for a singlehander sitting forward in the cockpit to balance the boat, Some owners complain that the cockpit scuppers are too small for proper draining,"

== See also ==
- List of sailing boat types
