= Colgate 26 =

Sailboat class

Development
- Designer: Jim Taylor
- Location: United States
- Year: 1996
- No. built: 375
- Builders: Precision Boat Works; Waterline Systems
- Role: Racer
- Name: Colgate 26

Boat
- Displacement: 2,600 lb (1,179 kg)
- Draft: 4.50 ft (1.37 m)

Hull
- Type: monohull
- Construction: fiberglass
- LOA: 25.67 ft (7.82 m)
- LWL: 20.00 ft (6.10 m)
- Beam: 8.50 ft (2.59 m)
- Engine: outboard motor

Hull appendages
- Keel: fin keel with weighted bulb
- Ballast: 1,050 lb (476 kg)
- Rudder: internally-mounted spade-type rudder

Rig
- Rig type: Bermuda rig

Sails
- Sailplan: fractional rigged sloop
- Total sail area: 338.00 sq ft (31.401 m^{2})

The Colgate 26 is an American trailerable sailboat that was designed by naval architect Jim Taylor, as a racer and first built in 1996. Steve and Doris Colgate provided the concept and specifications.

The design was named as Sailing World magazine's Boat of the Year.

== Production ==
The design was initially built by Precision Boat Works in Palmetto, Florida, United States, but that company had ended all boat production in 2018. In 2020, Colgate 26 production was moved to Waterline Systems in North Kingstown, Rhode Island.

== Design ==
The Colgate 26 was originally commissioned by Steve and Doris Colgate for sail training at their Offshore Sailing School.

The design is a recreational keelboat, built predominantly of solid fiberglass, with wood trim. It has a fractional sloop rig, a raked stem, a walk-through sharply reverse transom, an internally mounted spade-type rudder controlled by a tiller and a fixed fin keel or shoal draft keel with a weighted lead bulb. The fin keel version displaces 2,600 lb (1,179 kg) and carries 1,050 lb (476 kg) of ballast, while the shoal draft keel version displaces 2,800 lb (1,270 kg) and carries 1,250 lb (567 kg) of ballast.

The boat has a draft of 4.50 ft (1.37 m) with the standard keel and 3.5 ft (1.1 m) with the optional shoal draft keel.

The total sail area on boats built prior to 2005 is 283.00 sq ft (26.292 m^{2}) and after that date 338.00 sq ft (31.401 m^{2}).

The boat is normally fitted with a small outboard motor for docking and maneuvering. For sailing downwind the design may be equipped with a symmetrical spinnaker.

The design has sleeping accommodation for two people, with a double 7.25 ft (2.21 m) "V"-berth in the bow cabin. The galley is equipped with an alcohol-fired stove, portable ice box and an optional sink. The head is a portable type.

== Operational history ==
The boat is supported by an active class club that organizes racing events, Colgate 26 Sailboats.

Sales of the design were made to the US Coast Guard, US Navy and the Maine Maritime Academy for sailing training and competition. In US Navy service it is called the Navy 26.

In a 2002 review for Sail Magazine, John Kretschmer wrote, "the helm is very light, and even when the afternoon sea breeze finally piped up to a 12-to-15-knot range, it was fingertip control on the tiller. The cockpit offers good leg support, and the stainless railing really lends a sense of security when the boat heels. Falling off the wind, the boat accelerated as we gained sea room on a close reach. The boat felt powerful in the water, but completely under control and quite stiff. The purchase on the mainsheet was more than adequate, and as my daughter later proved, the small headsail can be trimmed by child, even in a blow. The gulf was choppy, but the 26 sliced through the waves without pounding. The rubrail tended to deflect spray, keeping the cockpit surprisingly dry. The small [spinnaker] really turbocharged the boat, and we zipped back toward the inlet, occasionally getting up on top of a wave. ... The Colgate 26 is appeals on many levels. It's safe, affordable, easy to maintain and very handsome. However, its nimble and spirited performance is clearly its best feature."

== See also ==
- List of sailing boat types
