= Transit 380 =

Sailboat class

Development
- Designer: Jim Taylor
- Location: United States
- Year: 2005
- Builder: Precision Boat Works
- Role: Youth sail training
- Name: Transit 380

Boat
- Displacement: 450 lb (204 kg)
- Draft: 3.30 ft (1.01 m) with centerboard down

Hull
- Type: monohull
- Construction: fiberglass
- LOA: 12.50 ft (3.81 m)
- LWL: 11.90 ft (3.63 m)
- Beam: 5.10 ft (1.55 m)

Hull appendages
- Keel: centerboard
- Rudder: transom-mounted rudder

Rig
- Rig type: Bermuda rig
- I foretriangle height: 12.63 ft (3.85 m)
- J foretriangle base: 4.00 ft (1.22 m)
- P mainsail luff: 15.16 ft (4.62 m)
- E mainsail foot: 7.60 ft (2.32 m)

Sails
- Sailplan: fractional rigged sloop
- Mainsail area: 61.00 sq ft (5.667 m^{2})
- Jib/genoa area: 25.30 sq ft (2.350 m^{2})
- Spinnaker area: 45.4 sq ft (4.22 m^{2})
- Total sail area: 86.30 sq ft (8.018 m^{2})

The Transit 380, styled as the Transit_380 or T_380, is an American sailing dinghy that was designed by Jim Taylor for youth sail training and first built in 2005. The boat was intended to act as a "transition" boat between the Optimist dinghy and more high performance boats. The designation indicates the length overall in centimeters.

== Production ==
The design was built by Precision Boat Works in Palmetto, Florida, United States starting in 2005, but it is now out of production.

== Design ==
The designer notes, "The T_380 design ... is intended to suit young sailors who are making the transition from the single-handed Optimist pram to high performance double-handed dinghies. Most kids 'size out' of the Opti at about 115 pounds, and between the ages of 11 and 14. After years of sailing alone in prams, many are also looking forward to sailing together with friends. Many do not yet have the sailing skills and experience required to handle a Club 420, however, and expecting them to do so is a bit like handing a new driver the keys to a Porsche. For decades, the Blue Jay and Widgeon (among others) have filled this gap, but time and technology have long since passed these boats by. The Transit_380 brings modern materials and carefully 'kid centered' design detailing to a contemporary version of this transitional mid boat."

The Transit 380 is a recreational sailboat, built predominantly of hand-laid fiberglass, with aluminum spars. It has a fractional sloop rig, a nearly-plumb stem, an open reverse transom, a transom-hung composite rudder controlled by a tiller and a retractable centerboard. It displaces 450 lb (204 kg) and has foam flotation, making it unsinkable.

The boat has a draft of 3.30 ft (1.01 m) with the centerboard extended and 5 in (13 cm) with it retracted, allowing operation in shallow water, beaching or ground transportation on a trailer.

For sailing downwind the design may be equipped with a symmetrical 45.4 sq ft (4.22 m^{2}) spinnaker.

== Operational history ==
In a 2006 review for Sail magazine Jim Springer wrote, "it's a stable two-person dinghy designed for the 11-to-15-year-old 'in-betweens' who don't fit in Optis anymore and aren't quite ready for prime time. It does have a racy planing hull and asymmetric spinnaker to keep young speed demons enthused. The rig is small enough to minimize capsizes, but if the boat does go over, the watertight mast and extra flotation on the mainsail head will help keep it from turtling. Once the boat is righted, the self-bailing cockpit drains quickly through the open transom. Precision Boatworks. "

== See also ==
- List of sailing boat types
