= Precision 28 =

Sailboat class

Development
- Designer: Jim Taylor
- Location: United States
- Year: 1997
- Builder: Precision Boat Works
- Role: Cruiser

Boat
- Displacement: 5,500 lb (2,495 kg)
- Draft: 3.67 ft (1.12 m)

Hull
- Type: monohull
- Construction: fiberglass
- LOA: 28.00 ft (8.53 m)
- LWL: 23.00 ft (7.01 m)
- Beam: 10.00 ft (3.05 m)
- Engine: Japanese Yanmar 2GMF 18 hp (13 kW) diesel engine

Hull appendages
- Keel: fin keel with weighted bulb
- Ballast: 1,900 lb (862 kg)
- Rudder: internally-mounted spade-type rudder

Rig
- Rig type: Bermuda rig
- I foretriangle height: 30.50 ft (9.30 m)
- J foretriangle base: 9.70 ft (2.96 m)
- P mainsail luff: 30.50 ft (9.30 m)
- E mainsail foot: 12.00 ft (3.66 m)

Sails
- Sailplan: fractional rigged sloop
- Mainsail area: 183.00 sq ft (17.001 m^{2})
- Jib/genoa area: 147.93 sq ft (13.743 m^{2})
- Total sail area: 330.93 sq ft (30.744 m^{2})

The Precision 28 is an American sailboat that was designed by Jim Taylor as a cruiser and first built in 1997.

The design was later developed from the 1989 Precision 27 by extending the transom and installing a swimming step.

== Production ==
The design was built by Precision Boat Works in Palmetto, Florida, United States, starting in 1989, but it is now out of production. Only a small number were built.

== Design ==
The Precision 28 is a recreational keelboat, built predominantly of fiberglass, with wood trim. It has a fractional sloop rig, a raked stem, a plumb transom with a swimming platform, an internally mounted spade-type rudder controlled by a tiller or optional wheel and a fixed fin keel with a lead bulb weight. It displaces 5,500 lb (2,495 kg) and carries 1,900 lb (862 kg) of ballast.

The boat has a draft of 3.67 ft (1.12 m) with the standard keel.

The boat is fitted with a Japanese Yanmar 2GMF diesel engine of 18 hp (13 kW) for docking and maneuvering. The fuel tank holds 9 U.S. gallons (34 L; 7.5 imp gal).

The design has sleeping accommodation for four people, with a double "V"-berth in the bow cabin and an aft cabin with a double berth on the port side. The galley is located on the port side just forward of the companionway ladder. The galley is L-shaped and is equipped with a two-burner stove, ice box and a sink. A navigation station is opposite the galley, on the starboard side. The head is located beside the companionway on the starboard side and includes a sink.

The design has a hull speed of 6.43 kn (11.91 km/h).

== Operational history ==
The designer notes, "the boats are comfortable and sailed well, and are quite popular with their owners."

== See also ==
- List of sailing boat types
