= 11:Metre One Design =

Sailboat class

Development
- Designer: Ron Holland & Rolf Gyhlenius
- Location: United States
- Year: 1990
- No. built: 350
- Builder: Precision Boat Works
- Role: One-design racer
- Name: 11:Metre One Design

Boat
- Displacement: 3,527 lb (1,600 kg)
- Draft: 5.90 ft (1.80 m)

Hull
- Type: monohull
- Construction: fiberglass
- LOA: 33.80 ft (10.30 m)
- LWL: 26.90 ft (8.20 m)
- Beam: 8.20 ft (2.50 m)

Hull appendages
- Keel: fin keel with weighted bulb
- Ballast: 1,598 lb (725 kg)
- Rudder: internally-mounted spade-type rudder

Rig
- Rig type: Bermuda rig
- I foretriangle height: 32.18 ft (9.81 m)
- J foretriangle base: 10.18 ft (3.10 m)
- P mainsail luff: 36.09 ft (11.00 m)
- E mainsail foot: 13.12 ft (4.00 m)

Sails
- Sailplan: fractional rigged sloop
- Mainsail area: 294.93 sq ft (27.400 m^{2})
- Jib/genoa area: 138.85 sq ft (12.900 m^{2})
- Spinnaker area: 860.03 sq ft (79.899 m^{2})
- Total sail area: 1,293.81 sq ft (120.199 m^{2})

The 11:Metre One Design, also called the 11 Metre or 11 Meter, is a one-design racer designed by Ron Holland and Rolf Gyhlenius as and first built in 1990.

The design was at one time a World Sailing international class.

== Production ==
The design was built by Precision Boat Works in Palmetto, Florida, United States, starting in 1990. Boats was also built in Norway, Australia and Sweden. A total of around 300 boats was completed during the 1990s.

== Design ==
The 11 Meter is a racing keelboat, built predominantly of cored fiberglass. It has a fractional sloop rig, a raked stem, a sharply reverse transom, an internally mounted spade-type rudder controlled by a tiller and a fixed fin keel with a weighted lead bulb. It displaces 3,527 lb (1,600 kg) and carries 1,598 lb (725 kg) of ballast.

The boat has a draft of 5.90 ft (1.80 m) with the standard keel.

The design has minimal cabin space, intended for storage space.

For sailing downwind the design may be equipped with a symmetrical masthead spinnaker.

== Operational history ==
The boat is supported by a class club that organizes racing events, the International 11:Metre One Design Class Association.

== World Championship ==
Year	Gold	Silver	Bronze
2002	SWE 320; Arne Sjöberg (SWE)	NOR 9111; Terje Wang (NOR)	NOR 8212; Torgeir Pedersen (NOR)
2004	AUS-220 Stephen McConaghy (AUS); Genevieve White (AUS); Michael Spies (AUS); Ethan Atkins (AUS); Scott McConaghy (AUS)		
2005	AUS-220 Stephen McConaghy (AUS); Scott McConaghy (AUS); Matt ALLEN (AUS); Michael SPIES (AUS)<	NOR-156 Team NORTH (NOR)	NOR-127 Morten Kjellås (NOR)
