= Seaforth 24 =

Sailboat class

Development
- Designer: Stephen Seaton
- Location: United States
- Year: 1977
- Builders: Capson Marine; Precision Boat Works
- Role: Cruiser
- Name: Seaforth 24

Boat
- Displacement: 4,200 lb (1,905 kg)
- Draft: 2.50 ft (0.76 m)

Hull
- Type: monohull
- Construction: fiberglass
- LOA: 24.00 ft (7.32 m)
- LWL: 17.00 ft (5.18 m)
- Beam: 7.33 ft (2.23 m)
- Engine: Renault RC8D 8 hp (6 kW) diesel engine

Hull appendages
- Keel: long keel
- Ballast: 1,600 lb (726 kg)
- Rudder: keel-mounted rudder

Rig
- Rig type: Bermuda rig
- I foretriangle height: 24.50 ft (7.47 m)
- J foretriangle base: 7.50 ft (2.29 m)
- P mainsail luff: 21.82 ft (6.65 m)
- E mainsail foot: 10.67 ft (3.25 m)

Sails
- Sailplan: masthead sloop
- Mainsail area: 116.41 sq ft (10.815 m^{2})
- Jib/genoa area: 91.88 sq ft (8.536 m^{2})
- Total sail area: 208.28 sq ft (19.350 m^{2})

The Seaforth 24 is an American sailboat that was designed by Stephen Seaton as a cruiser and first built in 1977.

== Production ==
The design was initially built by Capson Marine in 1977 and then by Precision Boat Works in Palmetto, Florida, United States, but it is now out of production.

== Design ==
The Seaforth 24 is a recreational keelboat, built predominantly of fiberglass, with wood trim. It has a masthead sloop rig with a bowsprit and a boomkin to support the backstay. The hull has a spooned raked stem, an angled transom, a keel-hung rudder controlled by a tiller and a fixed long keel. It displaces 4,200 lb (1,905 kg) and carries 1,600 lb (726 kg) of ballast.

The boat has a draft of 2.50 ft (0.76 m) with the standard keel.

The boat is fitted with a French Renault RC8D Yanmar 2GM20 diesel engine of 8 hp (6 kW) or a small 6 hp (4 kW) outboard motor for docking and maneuvering.

The design has sleeping accommodation for 2 people, with a double "V"-berth in the bow cabin. The galley is located on the port side just forward of the companionway ladder. The galley is equipped with a single-burner stove and a sink. Cabin headroom is 52 in (132 cm).

The design has a hull speed of 5.5 kn (10.2 km/h).

In a 2010 review Steve Henkel wrote, "Steve Seaton, the naval architect behind this little packet, has since been a designer of large power yachts. The craft he drew here is a well-made, pretty vessel that is capable of cruising along coasts—say passages from Long Island Sound to Block Island Sound to Narragansett Bay to Buzzards Bay to Vineyard Sound to Nantucket Sound—despite her modest LOD ... Best features: Sturdy, reasonably fast (we hear), and easy on the eyes if you enjoy traditional designs. Worst features: Trailering 6,100 pounds on the highway (including all the stuff you'll need for the two-week cruise you'll be starting when you get to your trailer-ramp destination requires a big truck or SUV to tow the load safely and without incident."
