= Precision 15 CB =

Sailboat class

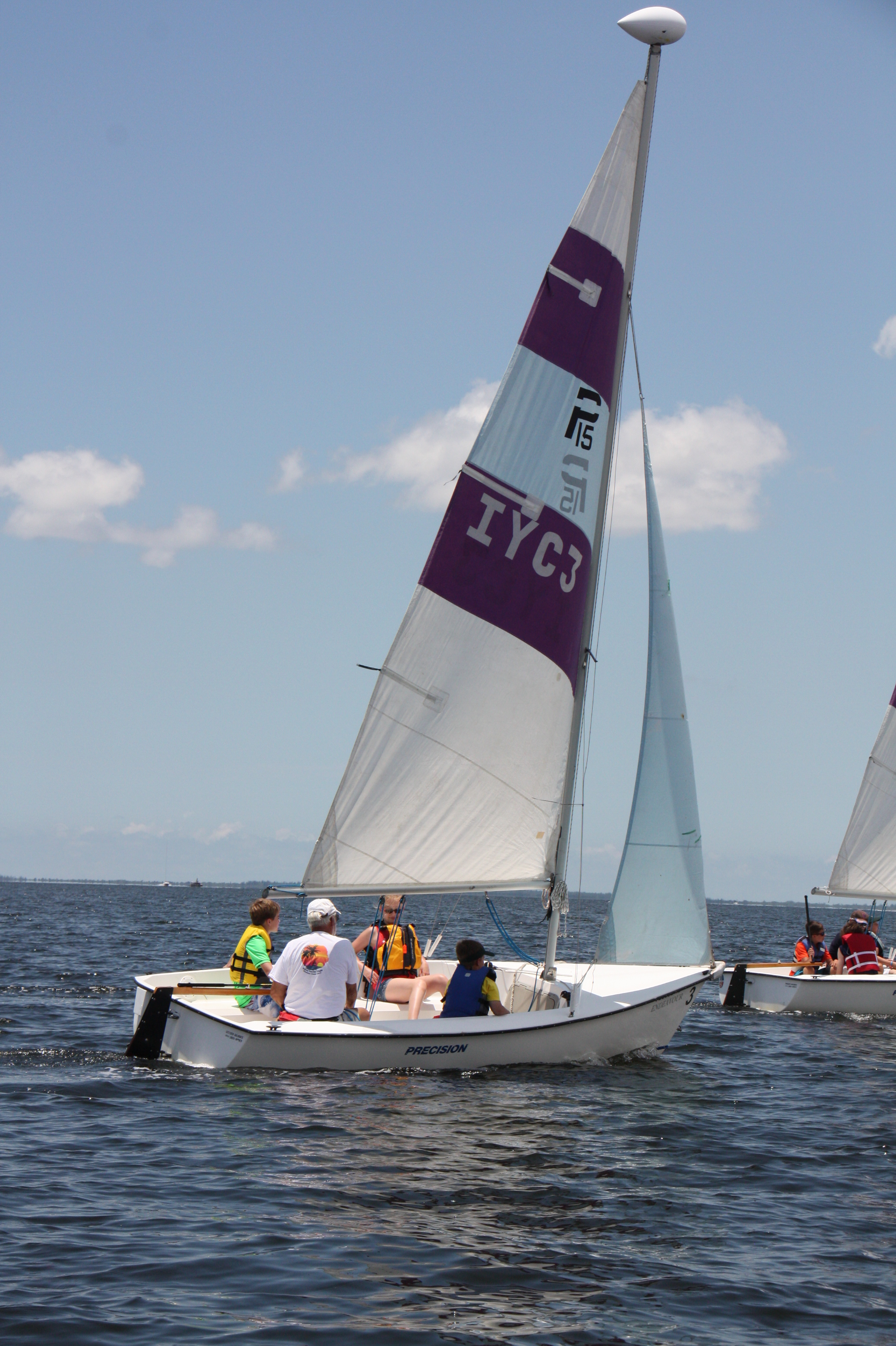

Development
- Designer: Jim Taylor
- Location: United States
- Year: 1995
- No. built: 800 (CB and K models combined)
- Builder: Precision Boat Works
- Role: Sailing dinghy
- Name: Precision 15 CB

Boat
- Displacement: 390 lb (177 kg)
- Draft: 3.67 ft (1.12 m) with centerboard down

Hull
- Type: Monohull
- Construction: Fiberglass
- LOA: 15.00 ft (4.57 m)
- LWL: 13.75 ft (4.19 m)
- Beam: 6.92 ft (2.11 m)

Hull appendages
- Keel: centerboard
- Rudder: transom-mounted rudder

Rig
- Rig type: Bermuda rig
- I foretriangle height: 15.20 ft (4.63 m)
- J foretriangle base: 4.70 ft (1.43 m)
- P mainsail luff: 17.90 ft (5.46 m)
- E mainsail foot: 8.90 ft (2.71 m)

Sails
- Sailplan: Fractional rigged sloop
- Mainsail area: 79.66 sq ft (7.401 m^{2})
- Jib/genoa area: 35.72 sq ft (3.318 m^{2})
- Total sail area: 115.38 sq ft (10.719 m^{2})

The Precision 15 CB is an American sailing dinghy, that was designed by Jim Taylor and first built in 1995.

There was also a version of the same design with a fixed keel, the Precision 15, sometimes called the Precision 15 K (for keel).

== Production ==
The design was built by Precision Boat Works in Palmetto, Florida, United States from 1995 to 2018. More than 800 examples of both models were produced.

== Design ==
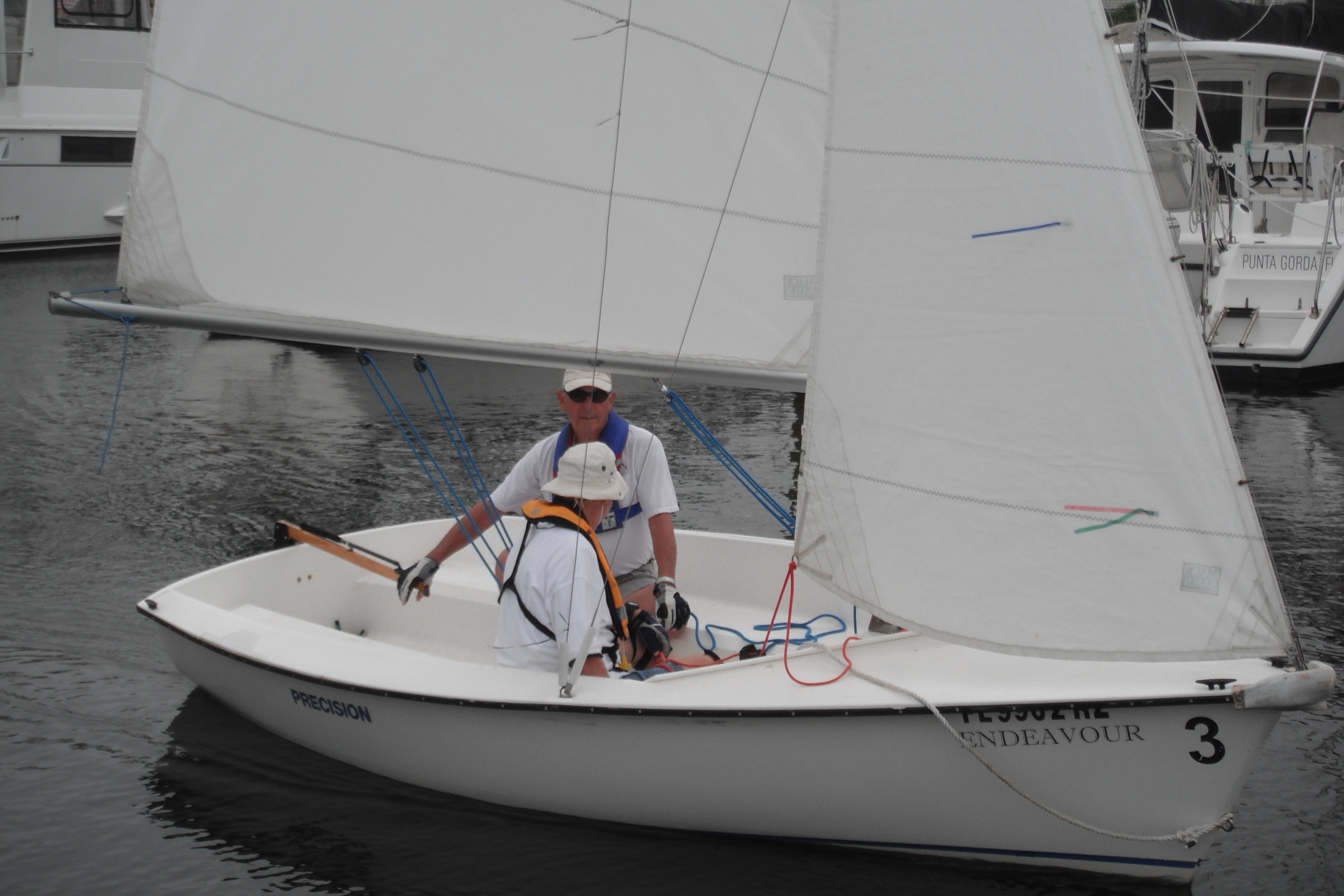
Precision 15 CB

The Precision 15 is a recreational sailboat, built predominantly of fiberglass, with a vinyl ester resin skin coat. It has a fractional sloop rig with anodized aluminum spars and a hinged mast step. The hull has a raked stem, a plumb transom, a transom-hung, kick-up rudder controlled by a wooden tiller, with a tiller extension and a retractable centerboard. The boat has foam flotation, a boom vang and jib tracks.

The boat has a draft of 3.67 ft (1.12 m) with the centerboard extended and 6 in (15 cm) with it retracted allowing beaching or ground transportation on a trailer.

The manufacturer lists the boat's design goals as "safety, stability, reliable handling, and sprightly speed under sail".

An optional mount may be fitted for a small outboard motor for docking and maneuvering.

The design has a hull speed of 4.97 kn (9.20 km/h).

== See also ==
- List of sailing boat types
