= Precision 14 =

Sailboat class

Development
- Designer: Stephen Seaton
- Location: United States
- Year: 1985
- Builder: Precision Boat Works
- Role: Day sailer

Boat
- Displacement: 250 lb (113 kg)
- Draft: 2.75 ft (0.84 m) with centerboard down

Hull
- Type: monohull
- Construction: fiberglass
- LOA: 13.83 ft (4.22 m)
- LWL: 11.83 ft (3.61 m)
- Beam: 6.08 ft (1.85 m)

Hull appendages
- Keel: centerboard
- Rudder: transom-mounted rudder

Rig
- Rig type: Bermuda rig

Sails
- Sailplan: fractional rigged sloop
- Total sail area: 129.00 sq ft (11.984 m^{2})

The Precision 14 is an American sailing dinghy that was designed by Stephen Seaton as a day sailer and first built in 1985.

== Production ==
The design was built by Precision Boat Works in Palmetto, Florida, United States, starting in 1985, but it is now out of production.

== Design ==
The Precision 14 is a recreational sailboat, built predominantly of fiberglass, with wood trim. It has a fractional sloop rig; a raked stem; a plumb transom; a transom-hung, kick-up rudder controlled by a tiller, with a hiking stick and a retractable centerboard. It displaces 250 lb (113 kg).

The boat has a draft of 2.75 ft (0.84 m) with the centerboard extended and 0.42 ft (0.13 m) with it retracted, allowing operation in shallow water, beaching or ground transportation on a trailer.

== See also ==
- List of sailing boat types
