= Precision Boat Works =

American sailboat manufacturer

- Company type: Privately held company
- Industry: Boat building
- Founded: 1978
- Headquarters: Palmetto, Florida, United States
- Products: Sailboats
- Owner: Richard and Bill Porter
- Website: www.precisionboatworks.com

Precision Boat Works, Inc. is an American boat builder, initially based in Palmetto, Florida and now in Sarasota, Florida. From 1978 until 2018, the company specialized in the design and manufacture of fiberglass sailboats, but today just produces parts for their existing fleet.

The company was founded by brothers Richard and Bill Porter in 1978.

== History ==
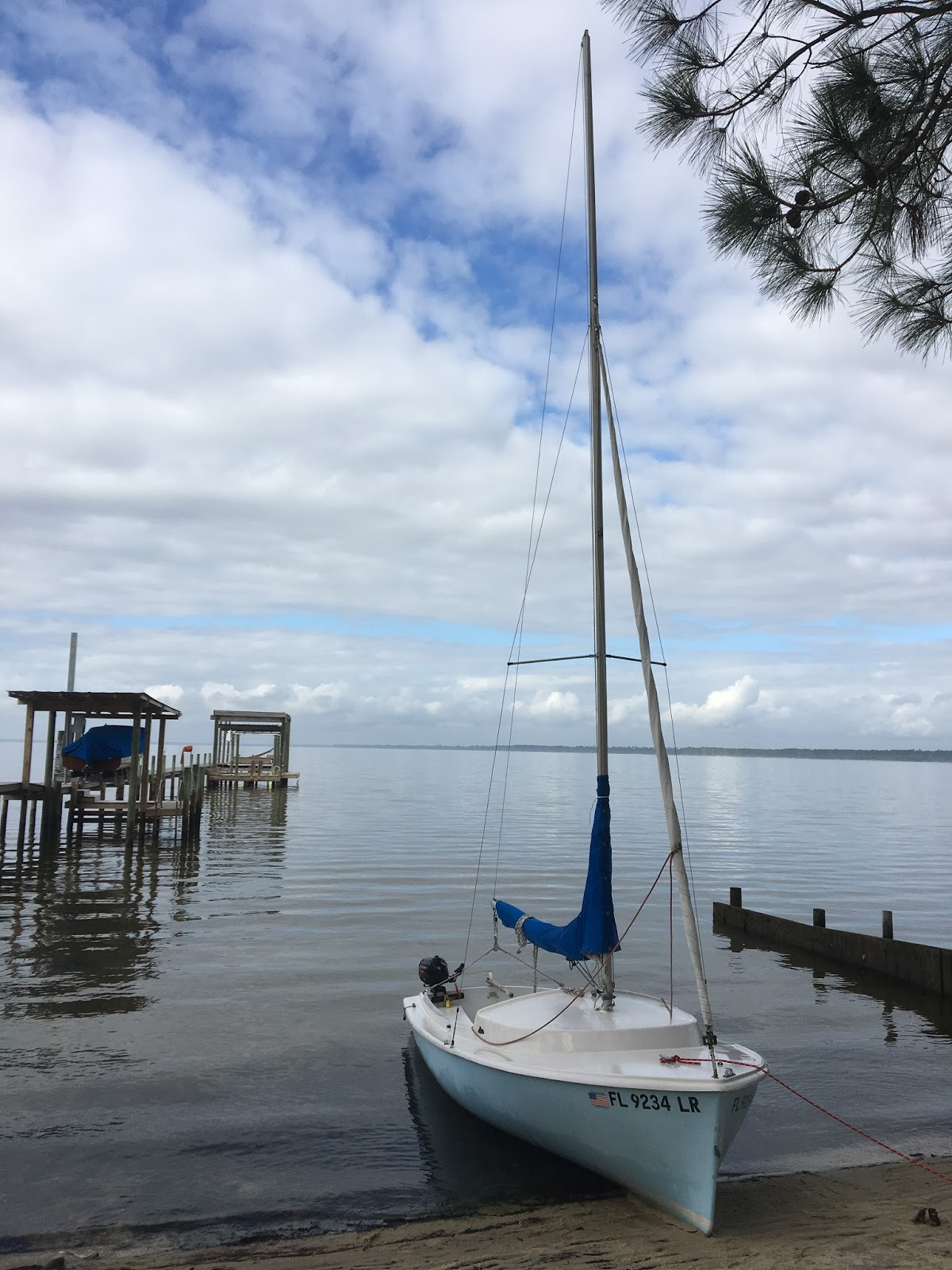
Day Sailer

The first design produced was the Uffa Fox and George O'Day-designed Day Sailer, as well as the Seaforth 24.

Many of the company's boats were designed by naval architect Jim Taylor of Marblehead, Massachusetts, a designer known for his America's Cup competition boats.

By 2018 the company was producing six designs, the Precision 15, 165, 18, 185, 21 and the 23. After a production run of nearly 5,000 boats, the Porters decided to retire in August 2018. Bill Porter continued making parts for the existing boat fleet and moved the parts business to Sarasota, Florida.

Author Steve Henkel praised the quality of construction of the company's boats in his 2010 book, The Sailor's Book of Small Cruising Sailboats, calling it "well above average", but noted that the company made many essential parts, like boom vangs optional. He wrote that the company has "solid construction ... good and caring customer service, and a well-satisfied and loyal owner group."

== Boats ==
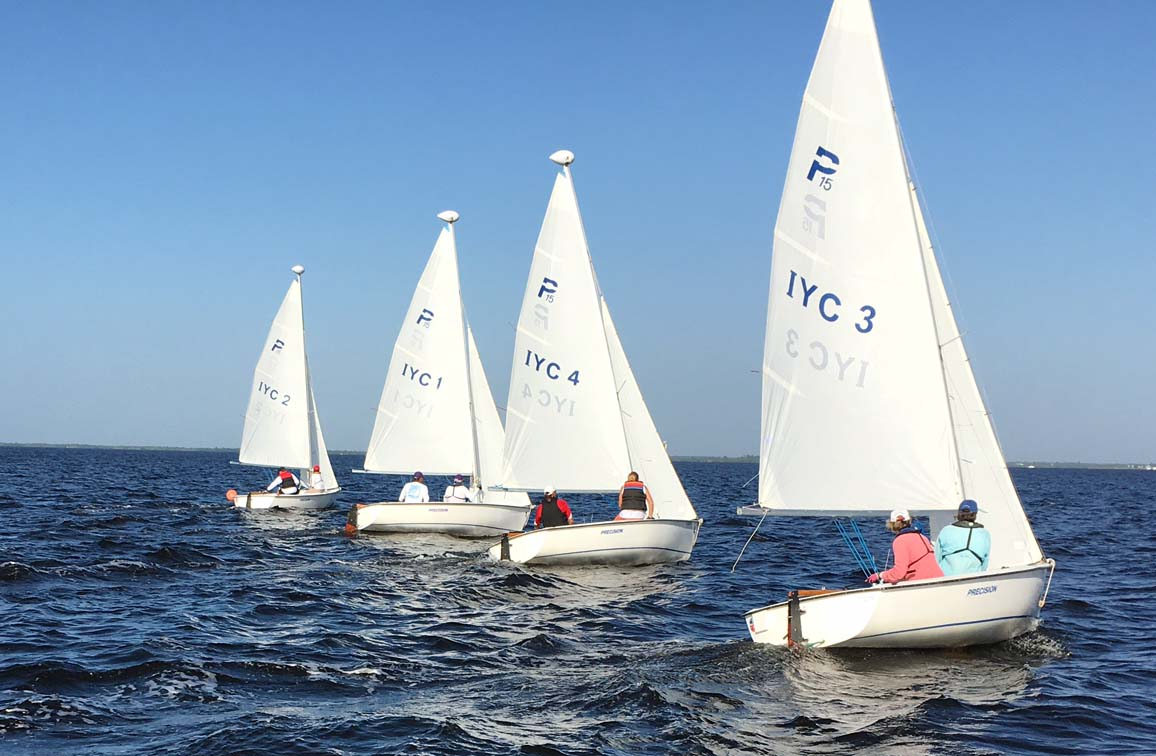
Precision 15s racing

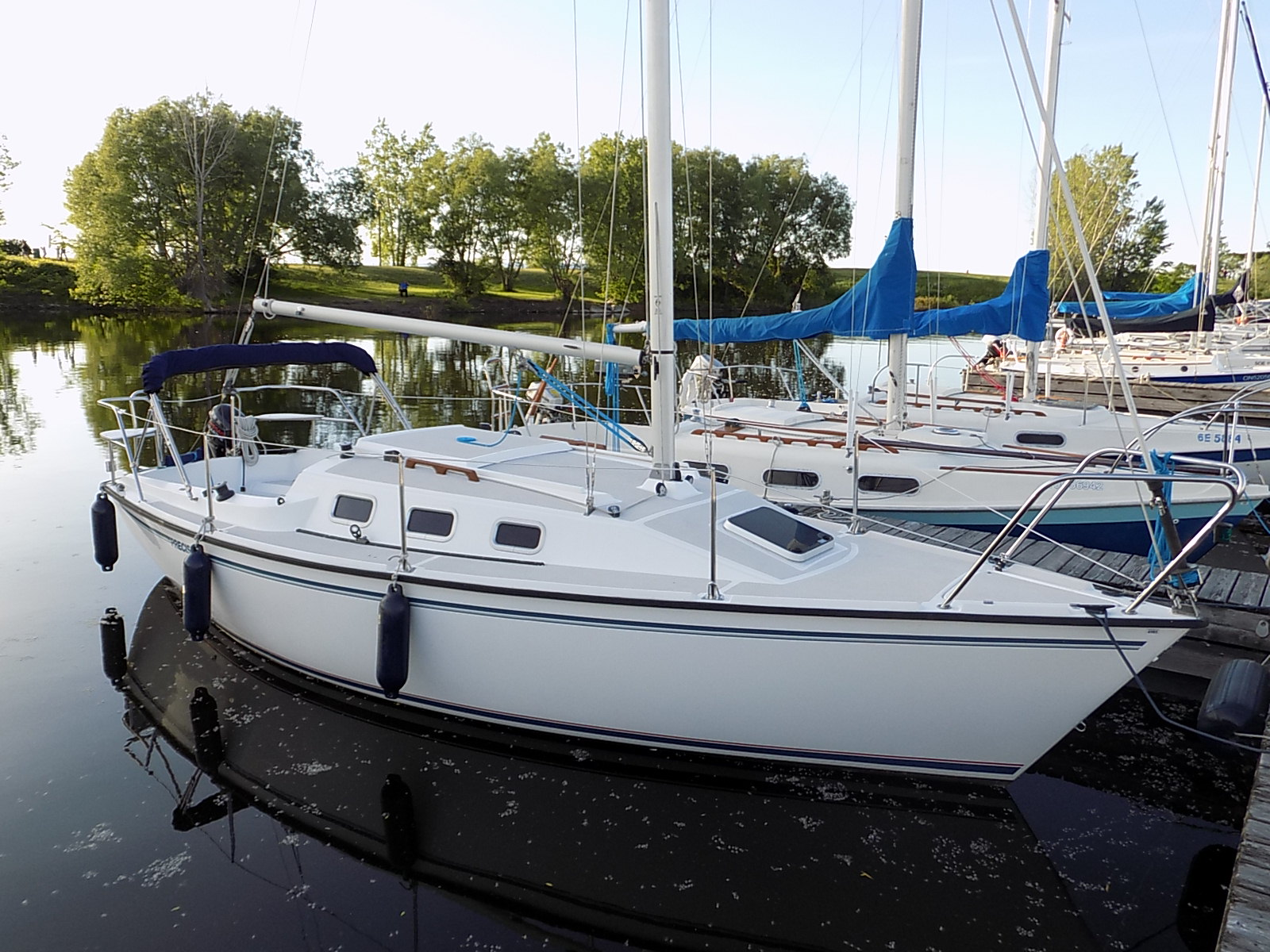
Precision 23

Summary of boats built by Precision Boat Works:

- Day Sailer - 1978
- Seaforth 24 - 1978
- Precision 18 - 1984
- Precision 13 - 1985
- Precision 14 - 1985
- Precision 16 - 1985
- Precision 21 - 1986
- Precision 23 - 1986
- Precision 27 - 1989
- 11 Meter - 1990
- Precision 15 - 1995
- Precision 15 CB - 1995
- Precision 165 - 1995
- Colgate 26 - 1996
- Precision 28 - 1997
- Precision 185 - 2001
- Precision 185 CB - 2001
- Transit 380 - 2005

== See also ==
- List of sailboat designers and manufacturers
