= Precision 165 =

1995–2018 US recreational keelboat

Development
- Designer: Jim Taylor
- Location: United States
- Year: 1995
- Builder: Precision Boat Works
- Role: Cruiser
- Name: Precision 165

Boat
- Displacement: 750 lb (340 kg)
- Draft: 1.75 ft (0.53 m)

Hull
- Type: monohull
- Construction: fiberglass
- LOA: 16.42 ft (5.00 m)
- LWL: 15.25 ft (4.65 m)
- Beam: 7.16 ft (2.18 m)
- Engine: outboard motor

Hull appendages
- Keel: fin keel with bulb and end-plates
- Ballast: 250 lb (113 kg)
- Rudder: transom-mounted rudder

Rig
- Rig type: Bermuda rig
- I foretriangle height: 18.25 ft (5.56 m)
- J foretriangle base: 5.40 ft (1.65 m)
- P mainsail luff: 18.40 ft (5.61 m)
- E mainsail foot: 8.40 ft (2.56 m)

Sails
- Sailplan: fractional rigged sloop
- Mainsail area: 77.28 sq ft (7.180 m^{2})
- Jib/genoa area: 49.28 sq ft (4.578 m^{2})
- Total sail area: 126.56 sq ft (11.758 m^{2})

The Precision 165 is a recreational keelboat built by Precision Boat Works in Palmetto, Florida, United States from 1995 until 2018.

== Design ==
The fiberglass hull has a raked stem, a slightly reverse transom, a transom-hung rudder controlled by a tiller and a fixed shoal draft keel with a weighted lead bulb and endplates. It has foam flotation, making it unsinkable.

It has a fractional sloop rig with three stays and no spreaders.

The design has sleeping accommodation for two people, with two straight settee berths in the main cabin. Cabin headroom is 42 in (107 cm).

It has a hull speed of 5.2 kn (9.6 km/h).

== Reception ==
In a 2010 review Steve Henkel wrote, "Designer Jim Taylor was one of the leading designers of America’s Cup boats in the 1990s. He has plenty of technical expertise, a good eye for what looks right in a small boat design, and has drawn a number of successful pocket cruisers. For some time he has been the designer of record for Precision Boatworks. The Precision 165 is the smallest cruising boat in the company's line. Best features: The P165 has a bigger beam, heavier ballast, and a fixed lead keel with 'end-plate effect' bulb compared with her peers' centerboards, plus the largest SA/D and lowest D/L in the comp[etitor] group. These differences help to make this boat relatively stiff and fast in a breeze. A simple three-stay rig (with no spreaders) makes rigging at the ramp easier and faster. Relatively short overhangs contribute for more manageable storage, especially in a one-car garage. Quality Harken blocks, vang sheeting arrangement, and a forward hatch are all nice features. Worst features: Fixed keel is less convenient at the launching ramp."

In a 2002 review naval architect Robert Perry concluded of the design, "entry-level boats, like entry-level guitars, must perform well enough to teach beginners the potential joys of playing. The Precision 165 would be a great way to get started in the sport of sailing."
