= Maple leaf (disambiguation) =

A maple leaf is the leaf of the maple tree.

Maple leaf may also refer to:

== Emblem of Canada ==
- Maple leaf, used as one of the national symbols of Canada
- Flag of Canada, which contains a red maple leaf
- Canadian Gold Maple Leaf, a gold bullion coin produced by the Royal Canadian Mint
- Canadian Silver Maple Leaf, a silver bullion coin produced by the Royal Canadian Mint

== Commerce ==
- Maple Leaf Bar, a night club in New Orleans, US
- Maple Leaf Foods, a Canadian meat packer
- Maple Leaf, the first chewing gum producer in the Netherlands

== Places ==
- Maple Leaf, Seattle, Washington, US
- Maple Leaf, South Dakota, US
- Maple Leaf, Toronto, Ontario, Canada

== Transport ==
=== Aircraft ===
- Maple Leaf (WB-2), a world record setting Wright-Bellanca aircraft from the 1920s

=== Sailing ===
- Maple Leaf 48, a Canadian sailboat design
- Maple Leaf 54, a Canadian sailboat design
- Maple Leaf (schooner), a 92-foot sailing vessel built in 1904, operating as a small cruise ship touring the west coast of North America
- Maple Leaf (shipwreck), a historic shipwreck in Jacksonville, Florida, US

=== Trains ===
- Maple Leaf (train), a passenger service operated by Amtrak and Via Rail between New York City and Toronto
- Maple Leaf (GTW train), a passenger train service operated by the Grand Trunk Western Railroad between Chicago and Toronto
- Maple Leaf (Lehigh Valley Railroad train), a passenger train service operated by the Lehigh Valley Railroad and the Canadian National Railway between New York City and Toronto, and another section by the Reading Railroad originating in Philadelphia

== Music ==
- Maple Leaf (album), a 2003 album by Valery Leontiev
- Maple Leaves (EP), a 2003 EP released by Jens Lekman
- "Maple Leaf Rag", a ragtime piece by Scott Joplin
- "Maple Leaf", a song by Jay Chou from the 2005 album November's Chopin

== Sport ==
=== Ice hockey ===
- Toronto Maple Leafs, a National Hockey League team, based in Toronto, Ontario, Canada
- Lethbridge Maple Leafs, a men's senior ice hockey team
- St. John's Maple Leafs, an American Hockey League team, later relocated and renamed the Toronto Marlies
- Verdun Maple Leafs (ice hockey), a defunct Quebec Major Junior Hockey League team
- Victoria Maple Leafs, a Western Hockey League team

=== Baseball ===
- Toronto Maple Leafs (semi-pro baseball), an Intercounty Baseball League team
- Toronto Maple Leafs (International League), a former AAA minor league baseball team

=== Football ===
- Notre-Dame-de-Grace Maple Leafs, a defunct Canadian junior football team

== Other uses ==
- Mapleleaf (freshwater mussel)
