= US Yachts US 35 =

Sailboat class

Development
- Designer: Stan Huntingford
- Location: United States
- Year: 1979
- Builder: US Yachts
- Role: Cruiser
- Name: US Yachts US 35

Boat
- Displacement: 13,250 lb (6,010 kg)
- Draft: 5.83 ft (1.78 m)

Hull
- Type: monohull
- Construction: fiberglass
- LOA: 35.25 ft (10.74 m)
- LWL: 28.50 ft (8.69 m)
- Beam: 12.00 ft (3.66 m)
- Engine: inboard motor

Hull appendages
- Keel: fin keel
- Ballast: 5,250 lb (2,381 kg)
- Rudder: skeg-mounted rudder

Rig
- Rig type: Bermuda rig
- I foretriangle height: 45.50 ft (13.87 m)
- J foretriangle base: 15.00 ft (4.57 m)
- P mainsail luff: 40.00 ft (12.19 m)
- E mainsail foot: 11.00 ft (3.35 m)

Sails
- Sailplan: masthead sloop
- Mainsail area: 220.00 sq ft (20.439 m^{2})
- Jib/genoa area: 341.25 sq ft (31.703 m^{2})
- Total sail area: 561.25 sq ft (52.142 m^{2})

The US Yachts US 35 is an American sailboat that was designed by Stan Huntingford as a cruiser and first built in 1979.

The design is a development of Huntingford's Cooper 353, using the same molds, which were purchased by Bayliner from Cooper Yachts.

== Production ==
The design was built by US Yachts in the United States, starting in 1979, but it is now out of production.

== Design ==
The US Yachts US 35 is a recreational keelboat, built predominantly of fiberglass, with wood trim. It has a masthead sloop rig; a raked stem; a raised counter, reverse transom; a skeg-mounted rudder controlled by a wheel and a fixed fin keel. It displaces 13,250 lb (6,010 kg) and carries 5,250 lb (2,381 kg) of ballast.

The boat has a draft of 5.83 ft (1.78 m) with the standard keel.

The boat is fitted with an inboard engine. The fuel tank holds 70 U.S. gallons (260 L; 58 imp gal) and the fresh water tank has a capacity of 100 U.S. gallons (380 L; 83 imp gal).

The design has sleeping accommodation for six people, with a double "V"-berth in the bow cabin, an U-shaped settee and a straight settee in the main cabin and an aft cabin with a double berth on the starboard side. The galley is located on the port side just forward of the companionway ladder. The galley is U-shaped and is equipped with a three-burner stove and a double sink. The head is located just aft of the bow cabin on the starboard side. Cabin headroom is 76 in (193 cm).

For sailing downwind the design may be equipped with a symmetrical spinnaker.

The design has a hull speed of 7.17 kn (13.28 km/h).

== See also ==
- List of sailing boat types

Related development

- Cooper 353
