= Ganbare =

Ganbare (がんばれ, Hang in there!), a form of the Japanese verb ganbaru, may refer to:

- Ganbare! Gian!!, a short Doraemon film
- Ganbare!! Robocon, a Japanese television program
- Ganbare!! Tabuchi-kun!!, a yonkoma manga series
- Ganbare 35, a Canadian racing sailboat design

== See also ==
- Ganbareh, a 2002 song by Sash!
