= US Yachts US 42 =

Sailboat class

Development
- Designer: Stan Huntingford
- Location: United States
- Year: 1982
- Builder: US Yachts
- Role: Cruiser
- Name: US Yachts US 42

Boat
- Displacement: 24,000 lb (10,886 kg)
- Draft: 6.58 ft (2.01 m)

Hull
- Type: monohull
- Construction: fiberglass
- LOA: 41.50 ft (12.65 m)
- LWL: 32.50 ft (9.91 m)
- Beam: 14.00 ft (4.27 m)
- Engine: British Motor Corporation 60 hp (45 kW) diesel engine

Hull appendages
- Keel: fin keel
- Ballast: 10,500 lb (4,763 kg)
- Rudder: skeg-mountedrudder

Rig
- Rig type: Bermuda rig
- I foretriangle height: 51.75 ft (15.77 m)
- J foretriangle base: 17.50 ft (5.33 m)
- P mainsail luff: 45.00 ft (13.72 m)
- E mainsail foot: 12.00 ft (3.66 m)

Sails
- Sailplan: fractional rigged sloop masthead sloop
- Mainsail area: 270.00 sq ft (25.084 m^{2})
- Jib/genoa area: 452.81 sq ft (42.067 m^{2})
- Total sail area: 772.81 sq ft (71.796 m^{2})

The US Yachts US 42 is an American sailboat that was designed by Stan Huntingford as a cruiser and first built in 1982.

The boat is a development of the Cooper 416, using the same molds, which were purchased by Bayliner from Cooper Yachts.

== Production ==
The design was built by US Yachts in the United States, from 1982 to 1986, but it is now out of production.

== Design ==
The US 42 is a recreational keelboat, built predominantly of fiberglass, with wood trim. It has a masthead sloop rig; a raked stem; a raised counter, reverse transom; a skeg-mounted rudder controlled by a wheel and a fixed fin keel. It displaces 24,000 lb (10,886 kg) and carries 10,500 lb (4,763 kg) of ballast.

The boat has a draft of 6.58 ft (2.01 m) with the standard keel.

The boat is fitted with a British Motor Corporation diesel engine of 60 hp (45 kW) for docking and maneuvering. The fuel tank holds 70 U.S. gallons (260 L; 58 imp gal) and the fresh water tank has a capacity of 150 U.S. gallons (570 L; 120 imp gal).

The design has sleeping accommodation for six people, with an angled double berth in the bow cabin, an L-shaped settee and a straight settee in the main cabin and an aft cabin with a double berth on the starboard side. The galley is located on the port side just forward of the companionway ladder. The galley is U-shaped and is equipped with a three-burner stove and a double sink. The head is located just aft of the bow cabin on the starboard side and includes a shower. Cabin headroom is 76 in (193 cm).

For sailing downwind the design may be equipped with a symmetrical spinnaker.

The design has a hull speed of 7.64 kn (14.15 km/h).

== See also ==
- List of sailing boat types

Related development

- Cooper 416
