= Cooper 367 =

Sailboat class

Development
- Designer: Stan Huntingford
- Location: Canada
- Year: 1984
- Builder: Cooper Enterprises
- Role: Cruiser
- Name: Cooper 367

Boat
- Displacement: 13,250 lb (6,010 kg)
- Draft: 5.83 ft (1.78 m)

Hull
- Type: monohull
- Construction: fibreglass
- LOA: 36.58 ft (11.15 m)
- LWL: 28.50 ft (8.69 m)
- Beam: 12.00 ft (3.66 m)
- Engine: inboard motor

Hull appendages
- Keel: fin keel
- Ballast: 5,250 lb (2,381 kg)
- Rudder: skeg-mounted rudder

Rig
- Rig type: Bermuda rig
- I foretriangle height: 45.50 ft (13.87 m)
- J foretriangle base: 15.00 ft (4.57 m)
- P mainsail luff: 40.00 ft (12.19 m)
- E mainsail foot: 11.00 ft (3.35 m)

Sails
- Sailplan: masthead sloop
- Mainsail area: 220.00 sq ft (20.439 m^{2})
- Jib/genoa area: 341.25 sq ft (31.703 m^{2})
- Total sail area: 561.25 sq ft (52.142 m^{2})

The Cooper 367 is a Canadian sailboat that was designed by Stan Huntingford as a cruiser and first built in 1984.

The boat is a development of the 1979 Cooper 353, with a longer length overall and greater displacement and ballast.

== Production ==
The design was built by Cooper Enterprises in Port Coquitlam, British Columbia, starting in 1984, but the company went out of business in 1990 and it is now out of production.

== Design ==
The Cooper 367 is a recreational keelboat, built predominantly of fibreglass. It has a masthead sloop rig, a skeg-mounted rudder and a fixed fin keel. It displaces 13,250 lb (6,010 kg) and carries 5,250 lb (2,381 kg) of ballast.

The boat has a draft of 5.83 ft (1.78 m) with the standard keel.

The design has a hull speed of 7.15 kn (13.24 km/h).

== See also ==
- List of sailing boat types
