= Banner 32 =

Sailboat class

Development
- Designer: Stan Huntingford
- Location: Canada
- Year: 1982
- Builder: Cooper Enterprises
- Role: Cruiser
- Name: Banner 32

Boat
- Displacement: 10,500 lb (4,763 kg)
- Draft: 5.82 ft (1.77 m)

Hull
- Type: monohull
- Construction: fibreglass
- LOA: 32.00 ft (9.75 m)
- LWL: 26.00 ft (7.92 m)
- Beam: 10.92 ft (3.33 m)
- Engine: Volvo MD-11 22 hp (16 kW) diesel engine

Hull appendages
- Keel: fin keel
- Ballast: 3,180 lb (1,442 kg)
- Rudder: skeg-mounted rudder

Rig
- Rig type: Bermuda rig

Sails
- Sailplan: masthead sloop

The Banner 32 is a Canadian sailboat that was designed by Stan Huntingford as a cruiser and first built in 1982.

== Production ==
The design was built by Cooper Enterprises in Port Coquitlam, British Columbia, starting in 1982, but the company went out of business in 1990 and it is now out of production.

== Design ==
The Banner 32 is a recreational keelboat, built predominantly of fibreglass. It has a masthead sloop rig, a skeg-mounted rudder and a fixed fin keel. It displaces 10,500 lb (4,763 kg) and carries 3,180 lb (1,442 kg) of ballast.

The boat has a draft of 5.82 ft (1.77 m) with the standard keel.

The boat is fitted with a Swedish Volvo MD-11 diesel engine of 22 hp (16 kW) for docking and manoeuvring.

The design has a hull speed of 6.83 kn (12.65 km/h).

== See also ==
- List of sailing boat types
