= Cooper 508 =

Sailboat class

Development
- Designer: Stan Huntingford
- Location: Canada
- Year: 1981
- No. built: 5
- Builder: Cooper Enterprises
- Role: Cruiser
- Name: Cooper 508

Boat
- Displacement: 38,350 lb (17,395 kg)
- Draft: 8.00 ft (2.44 m)

Hull
- Type: monohull
- Construction: fibreglass
- LOA: 50.67 ft (15.44 m)
- LWL: 44.00 ft (13.41 m)
- Beam: 15.00 ft (4.57 m)
- Engine: Lehman 85 hp (63 kW) diesel engine

Hull appendages
- Keel: fin keel
- Ballast: 16,500 lb (7,484 kg)
- Rudder: skeg-mounted rudder

Rig
- Rig type: Bermuda rig

Sails
- Sailplan: masthead sloop
- Total sail area: 1,239.00 sq ft (115.107 m^{2})

The Cooper 508 is a Canadian sailboat that was designed by Stan Huntingford as a cruiser and first built in 1981.

The design was the subject of a legal dispute and, as a result, only five boats were completed.

== Production ==
The design was built by Cooper Enterprises in Port Coquitlam, British Columbia, starting in 1981, but only five boats were built before production was ended, due to a legal dispute.

== Design ==
The Cooper 508 is a recreational keelboat, built predominantly of fibreglass. It has a masthead sloop rig with double spreaders, a raked stem, a reverse transom, a skeg-mounted rudder controlled by a wheel in a centre-mounted wheelhouse and a fixed fin keel. It displaces 38,350 lb (17,395 kg) and carries 16,500 lb (7,484 kg) of ballast.

The boat has a draft of 8.00 ft (2.44 m) with the standard keel.

The boat is fitted with a Lehman diesel engine of 85 hp (63 kW) for docking and manoeuvring. The fuel tank holds 185 U.S. gallons (700 L; 154 imp gal) and the fresh water tank also has a capacity of 185 U.S. gallons (700 L; 154 imp gal).

The design has sleeping accommodation for seven people, with an off-set double "V"-berth in the bow cabin, a drop down dinette table and a straight settee in the main cabin and an aft cabin with a double berth on the starboard side. The galley is located on the port side just forward of the companionway ladder. The galley is U-shaped and is equipped with a three-burner stove and a double sink. There are two heads, one just aft of the bow cabin on the port side and one in the aft cabin. The wheelhouse has a navigation station, plus a salon with a dinette table."

For sailing downwind the design may be equipped with a symmetrical spinnaker.

The design has a hull speed of 8.89 kn (16.46 km/h).

== Operational history ==
A May 1981 review in Cruising World reported, "Cooper Yachts of British Columbia are the builders of several fine medium-size cruising boats, the latest of which is the Cooper 508. Designed by Stan Huntingford, she has a large raised deckhouse, beneath which is the engine, generator and other gear. The flush deck forward adds considerable volume to the interior, which could sleep a tribe of voyagers ... All the Cooper yachts have a bit of a different look to them, tailored as they are to the climatic conditions in which they are built. Each seems to be a pleasant combination of form and function."

== See also ==
- List of sailing boat types
