= Fortune 30 =

Sailboat class

Development
- Designer: Stan Huntingford
- Location: Canada
- Year: 1974
- Builder: Cooper Enterprises
- Role: Cruiser

Boat
- Displacement: 10,300 lb (4,672 kg)
- Draft: 4.00 ft (1.22 m)

Hull
- Type: monohull
- Construction: fibreglass
- LOA: 30.00 ft (9.14 m)
- LWL: 22.67 ft (6.91 m)
- Beam: 10.50 ft (3.20 m)
- Engine: Volvo diesel engine

Hull appendages
- Keel: fin keel
- Ballast: 3,000 lb (1,361 kg)
- Rudder: skeg-mounted rudder

Rig
- Rig type: Cutter rig

Sails
- Sailplan: Cutter rigged sloop
- Total sail area: 470.00 sq ft (43.664 m^{2})

The Fortune 30 is a Canadian sailboat that was conceived by Canadian TV weather presenter, Bob Fortune and designed by Stan Huntingford as a cruiser, first built in 1974.

== Production ==
The design's hull was built by Cooper Enterprises in Port Coquitlam, British Columbia and then finished by a number of local boatyards, including Philbrook's Boatyard in Sidney, British Columbia.

== Design ==
The Fortune 30 is a recreational keelboat, built predominantly of fibreglass, with wood trim. It has a cutter rig, a clipper bow, an angled transom, a skeg-mounted rudder controlled by a wheel and a fixed fin keel. It displaces 10,300 lb (4,672 kg) and carries 3,000 lb (1,361 kg) of ballast.

The boat has a draft of 4.00 ft (1.22 m) with the standard keel.

The boat is fitted with a Swedish Volvo diesel engine for docking and maneuvering. The fuel tank holds 40 U.S. gallons (150 L; 33 imp gal) and the fresh water tank has a capacity of 50 U.S. gallons (190 L; 42 imp gal).

The design has a hull speed of 6.38 kn (11.82 km/h).

== See also ==
- List of sailing boat types
