= Banner 37 =

Sailboat class

Development
- Designer: Stan Huntingford
- Location: Canada
- Year: 1982
- Builder: Cooper Enterprises
- Role: Cruiser

Boat
- Displacement: 13,500 lb (6,123 kg)
- Draft: 5.92 ft (1.80 m)

Hull
- Type: monohull
- Construction: fibreglass
- LOA: 36.58 ft (11.15 m)
- LWL: 28.75 ft (8.76 m)
- Beam: 12.00 ft (3.66 m)
- Engine: Volvo MD17D diesel engine

Hull appendages
- Keel: fin keel
- Ballast: 5,500 lb (2,495 kg)

Rig
- Rig type: Bermuda rig
- I foretriangle height: 47.50 ft (14.48 m)
- J foretriangle base: 16.00 ft (4.88 m)
- P mainsail luff: 42.00 ft (12.80 m)
- E mainsail foot: 13.00 ft (3.96 m)

Sails
- Sailplan: masthead sloop
- Mainsail area: 273.00 sq ft (25.363 m^{2})
- Jib/genoa area: 380.00 sq ft (35.303 m^{2})
- Total sail area: 653.00 sq ft (60.666 m^{2})

The Banner 37 is a Canadian sailboat that was designed by Stan Huntingford as a cruiser and first built in 1982.

== Production ==
The design was built by Cooper Enterprises in Port Coquitlam, British Columbia, starting in 1982, but the company went out of business in 1990 and it is now out of production.

== Design ==
The Banner 37 is a recreational keelboat, built predominantly of fibreglass, with wood trim. It has a masthead sloop rig, a raked stem and a fixed fin keel. It displaces 13,500 lb (6,123 kg) and carries 5,500 lb (2,495 kg) of ballast.

The boat has a draft of 5.82 ft (1.77 m) with the standard keel.

The boat is fitted with a Swedish Volvo MD17D diesel engine for docking and manoeuvring. The fuel tank holds 30 U.S. gallons (110 L; 25 imp gal) and the fresh water tank has a capacity of 50 U.S. gallons (190 L; 42 imp gal).

The design has a hull speed of 7.18 kn (13.30 km/h).

== See also ==
- List of sailing boat types
