= Martin 29 =

Sailboat class

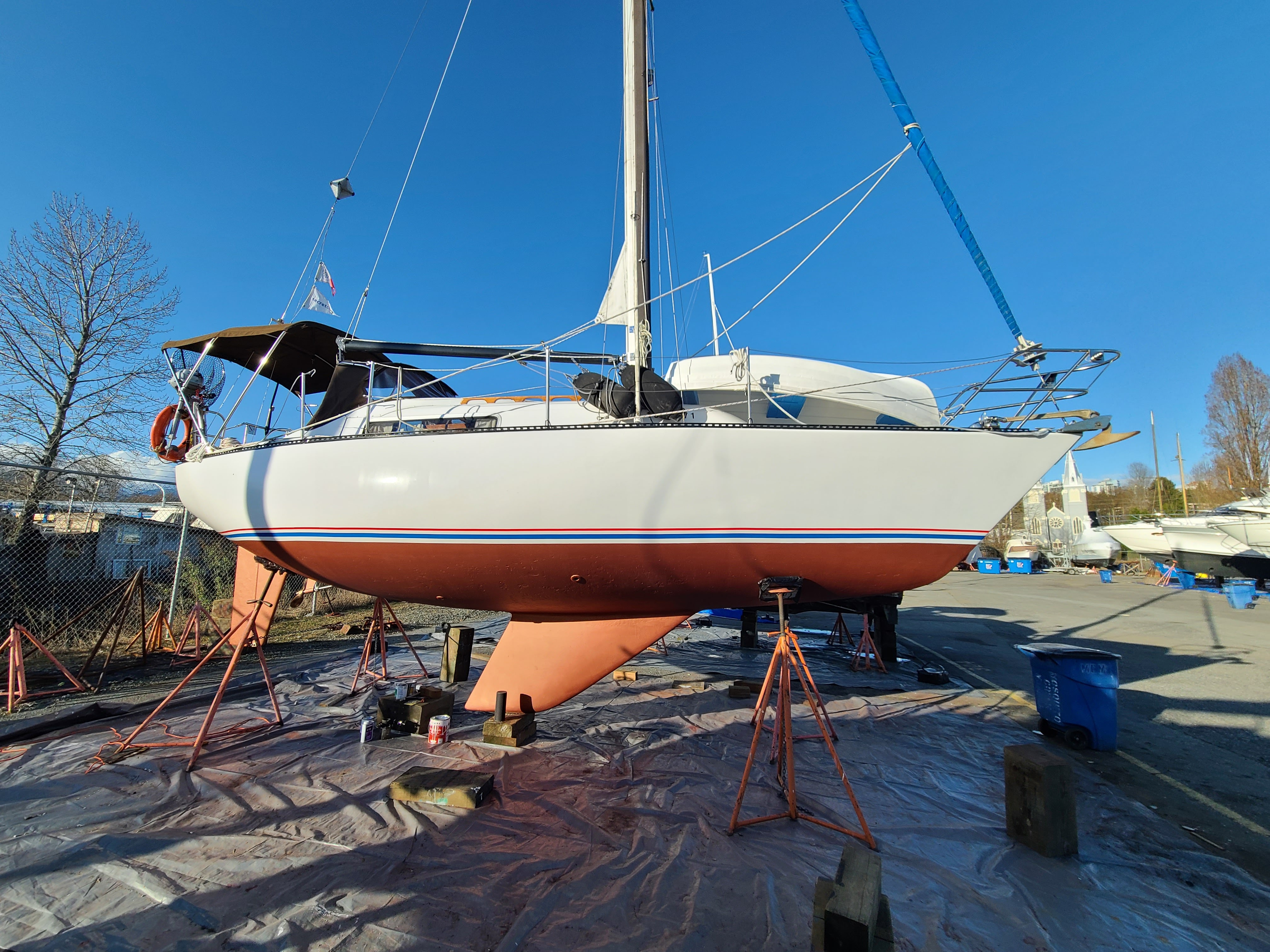

Development
- Designer: Don Martin
- Location: Canada
- Year: 1972
- Builder: Cooper Enterprises
- Role: Racer-Cruiser
- Name: Martin 29

Boat
- Displacement: 6,200 lb (2,812 kg)
- Draft: 4.75 ft (1.45 m)

Hull
- Type: monohull
- Construction: fibreglass
- LOA: 28.58 ft (8.71 m)
- LWL: 22.50 ft (6.86 m)
- Beam: 9.25 ft (2.82 m)
- Engine: Volvo MD6A 12 hp (9 kW) diesel engine

Hull appendages
- Keel: fin keel
- Ballast: 2,500 lb (1,134 kg)
- Rudder: internally-mounted spade-type rudder

Rig
- Rig type: Bermuda rig
- I foretriangle height: 36.00 ft (10.97 m)
- J foretriangle base: 11.40 ft (3.47 m)
- P mainsail luff: 31.50 ft (9.60 m)
- E mainsail foot: 9.50 ft (2.90 m)

Sails
- Sailplan: masthead sloop
- Mainsail area: 149.63 sq ft (13.901 m^{2})
- Jib/genoa area: 205.20 sq ft (19.064 m^{2})
- Total sail area: 354.83 sq ft (32.965 m^{2})

The Martin 29 is a Canadian sailboat that was designed by Don Martin as an International Offshore Rule Half Ton class racer-cruiser and first built in 1972.

== Production ==
The design was built by Cooper Enterprises in Port Coquitlam, British Columbia, starting in 1972, but the company went out of business in 1990 and the boat out of production.

== Design ==
The Martin 29 is a recreational keelboat, built predominantly of fibreglass, with wood trim. It has a masthead sloop rig, a raked stem, an internally mounted spade-type rudder and a fixed fin keel. It displaces 6,200 lb (2,812 kg) and carries 2,500 lb (1,134 kg) of ballast.

The boat has a draft of 4.75 ft (1.45 m) with the standard keel.

The boat is fitted with a Swedish Volvo MD6A diesel engine of 12 hp (9 kW) for docking and manoeuvring. The fuel tank holds 12 U.S. gallons (45 L; 10.0 imp gal) and the fresh water tank has a capacity of 24 U.S. gallons (91 L; 20 imp gal).

The design has a hull speed of 6.36 kn (11.78 km/h).

== Operational history ==
The boat is supported by an active class club that organizes racing events, the Half Ton Class.

== See also ==
- List of sailing boat types
