= Sea Bird 37 =

Sailboat class

Development
- Designer: Stan Huntingford and Hardin International
- Location: Canada
- Year: 1973
- Builders: Cooper Enterprises; Hardin International
- Role: Cruiser
- Name: Sea Bird 37

Boat
- Displacement: 18,000 lb (8,165 kg)
- Draft: 4.00 ft (1.22 m)

Hull
- Type: monohull
- Construction: fibreglass
- LOA: 36.75 ft (11.20 m)
- LWL: 32.50 ft (9.91 m)
- Beam: 11.50 ft (3.51 m)
- Engine: Perkins Engines 4-108 40 hp (30 kW) diesel engine

Hull appendages
- Keel: long keel
- Ballast: 6,000 lb (2,722 kg)
- Rudder: keel-mounted rudder

Rig
- Rig type: Ketch rig

Sails
- Sailplan: Masthead ketch
- Total sail area: 551.00 sq ft (51.190 m^{2})

The Sea Bird 37 is a recreational keelboat built by Cooper Enterprises starting in 1973, but it is now out of production. It was also built by Hardin International in Kaohsiung, Taiwan from 1977 to 1988.

== Design ==
The design was developed into a motorsailer with a new deck and pilothouse, designated the Sea Bird 37 MS.

Designed by Stan Huntingford and Hardin International, the fibreglass hull could be optioned with an aft or centre cockpit. The boat has a raked stem, a nearly plumb transom, a/an keel-mounted rudder controlled by a wheel and a fixed long keel. It displaces 18,000 lb (8,165 kg) and carries 6,000 lb (2,722 kg) of ballast.

The boat has a draft of 4.00 ft (1.22 m) with the standard long keel.

It was built with a choice of either a ketch or masthead sloop.

The boat is fitted with a British Perkins Engines 4-108 diesel engine of 40 hp (30 kW) for docking and manoeuvring. The fuel tank holds 100 U.S. gallons (380 L; 83 imp gal) and the fresh water tank has a capacity of 80 U.S. gallons (300 L; 67 imp gal).

The centre cockpit version has sleeping accommodation for six people, with two single berths in the bow cabin, a drop-down dinette table in the main cabin and an aft cabin with a transverse double berth. The galley is located on the starboard side just forward of the companionway ladder. The galley is U-shaped and is equipped with a two-burner stove, an ice box and a sink. There are two heads, one in the forepeak, forward of the bow cabin and one on the starboard side in the aft cabin.

The design has a hull speed of 7.64 kn (14.15 km/h).
