= Catalina 22 =

American trailer sailer

Catalina 22 Swing Keel
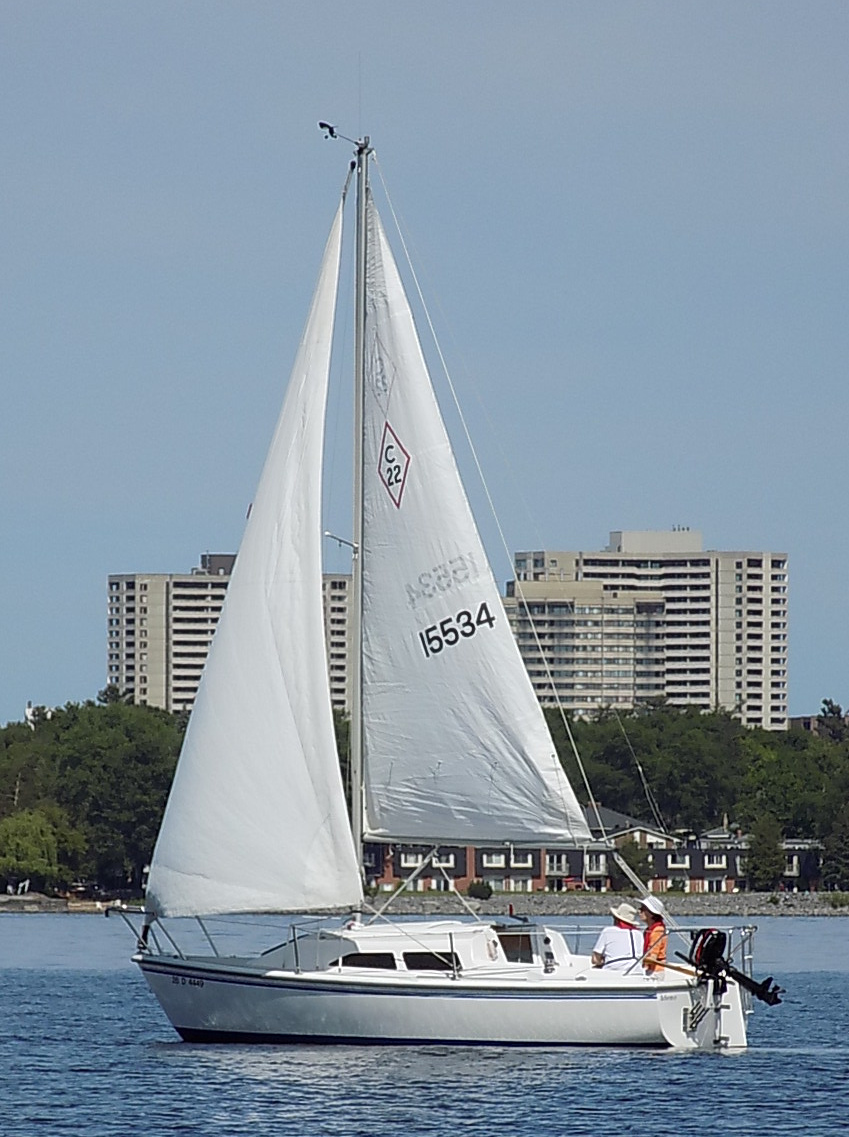

Development
- Designer: Frank V. Butler
- Location: United States
- Year: 1969
- No. built: 15,000 (by 2009)
- Builder: Catalina Yachts
- Name: Catalina 22 Swing Keel

Boat
- Displacement: 2,490 lb (1,129 kg)
- Draft: 5.00 ft (1.52 m) with swing keel down

Hull
- Type: Monohull
- Construction: Fiberglass
- LOA: 21.50 ft (6.55 m)
- LWL: 19.33 ft (5.89 m)
- Beam: 7.67 ft (2.34 m)
- Engine: Outboard motor

Hull appendages
- Keel: swing keel
- Ballast: 450 lb (204 kg)
- Rudder: transom-mounted rudder

Rig
- Rig type: Bermuda rig
- I foretriangle height: 25.83 ft (7.87 m)
- J foretriangle base: 8.00 ft (2.44 m)
- P mainsail luff: 21.00 ft (6.40 m)
- E mainsail foot: 9.66 ft (2.94 m)

Sails
- Sailplan: Masthead sloop
- Mainsail area: 101.43 sq ft (9.423 m^{2})
- Jib/genoa area: 103.32 sq ft (9.599 m^{2})
- Total sail area: 204.75 sq ft (19.022 m^{2})

Racing
- PHRF: 270 (average)

The Catalina 22 is a 21.5 foot long American keelboat first built in 1969. It is one of the most produced boats in its size range. In 1994 there were 70 racing fleets across the US.

== Production ==
It is built by Catalina Yachts, has been built by Cooper Enterprises in Canada. It has also been manufactured in Australia as the Boomaroo 22 before being relaunched as the Catalina 22. The design was manufactured in the United Kingdom as the Alacrity 22 (later known as the Jaguar 22).

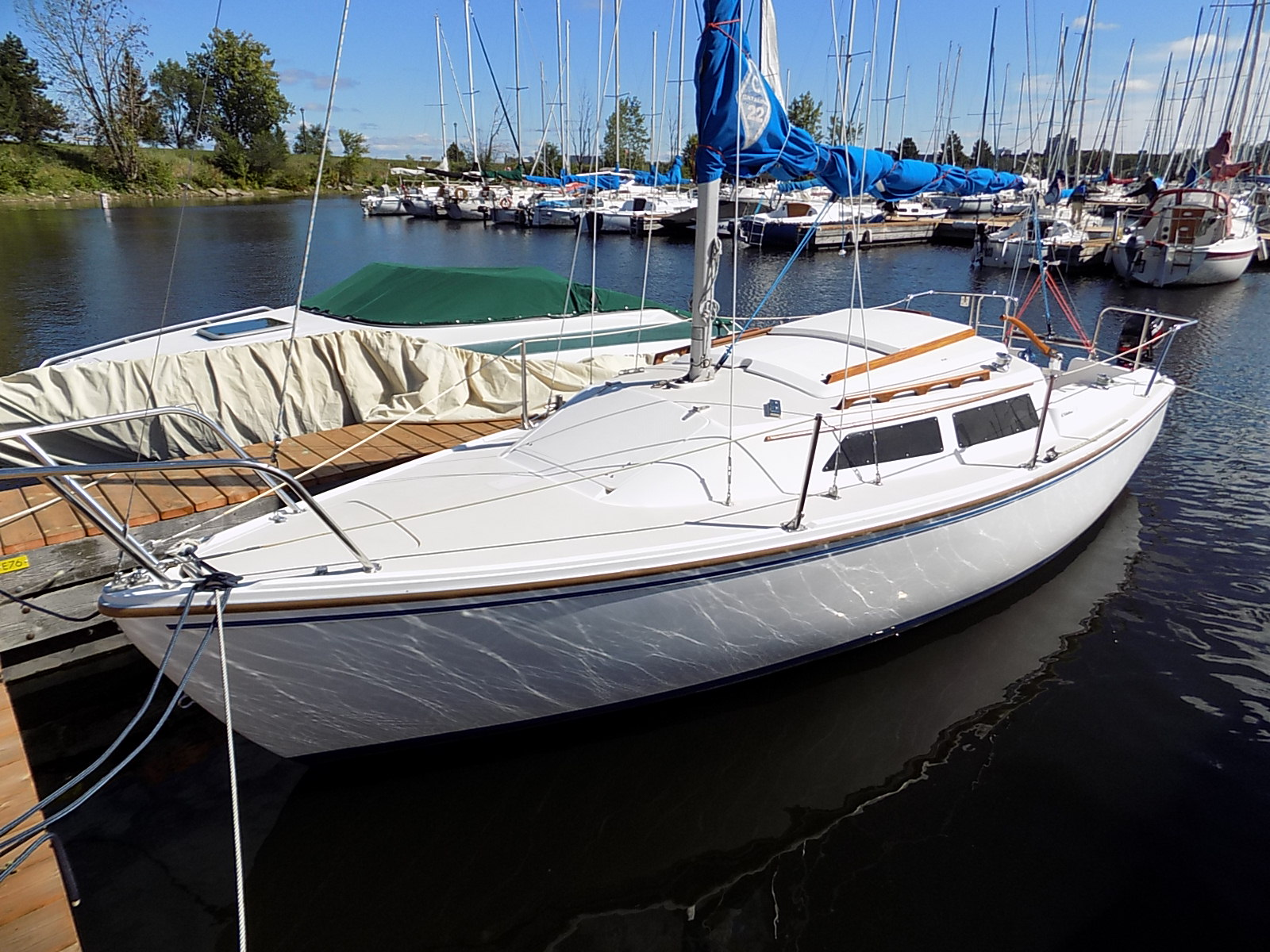
Catalina 22

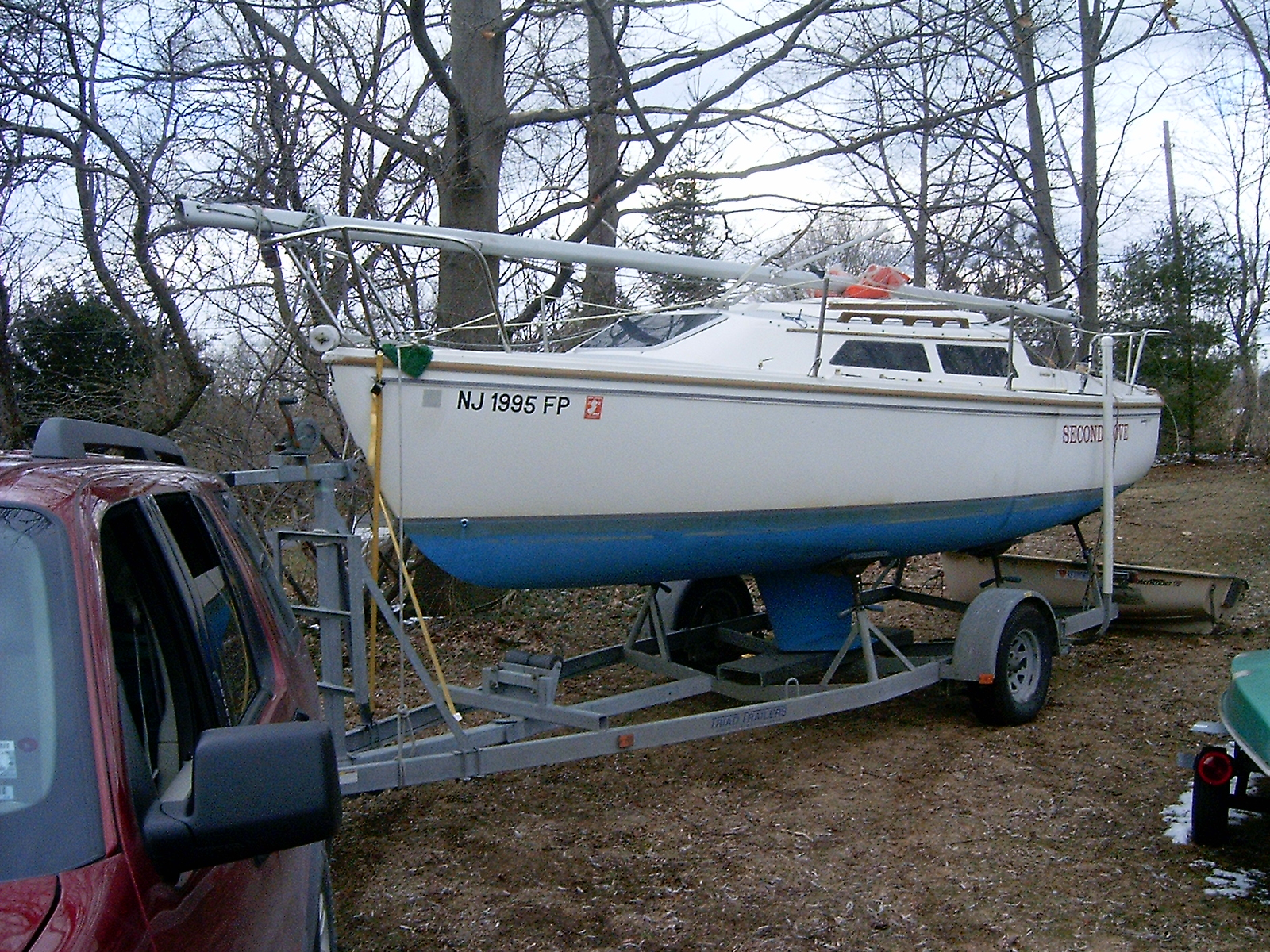
A Catalina 22 with a wing keel, on its road trailer.

== Design ==
Designed by Frank V. Butler, the fiberglass hull has a raked stem, a vertical transom, a large self-bailing cockpit, with under-seat lockers, a transom-hung rudder controlled by a tiller and a fixed fin keel. Models have been built with folding swing keels, wing keels and fin keels.

It has a masthead sloop rig. It has two winches for the jibsheets. Sails include a jib, 150% genoa and a spinnaker.

The boat is normally fitted with a small 3 to 6 hp (2 to 4 kW) outboard motor for docking and maneuvering.

Accommodations include a forward "V" berth with a privacy curtain and a port berth with an optional head that can be stowed underneath. The main cabin area includes a dinette table and a molded fiberglass galley that rolls away under the cockpit space. The foredeck features an opening hatch for ventilation. The companionway hatch may have a "pop-top" fitted for additional headroom.

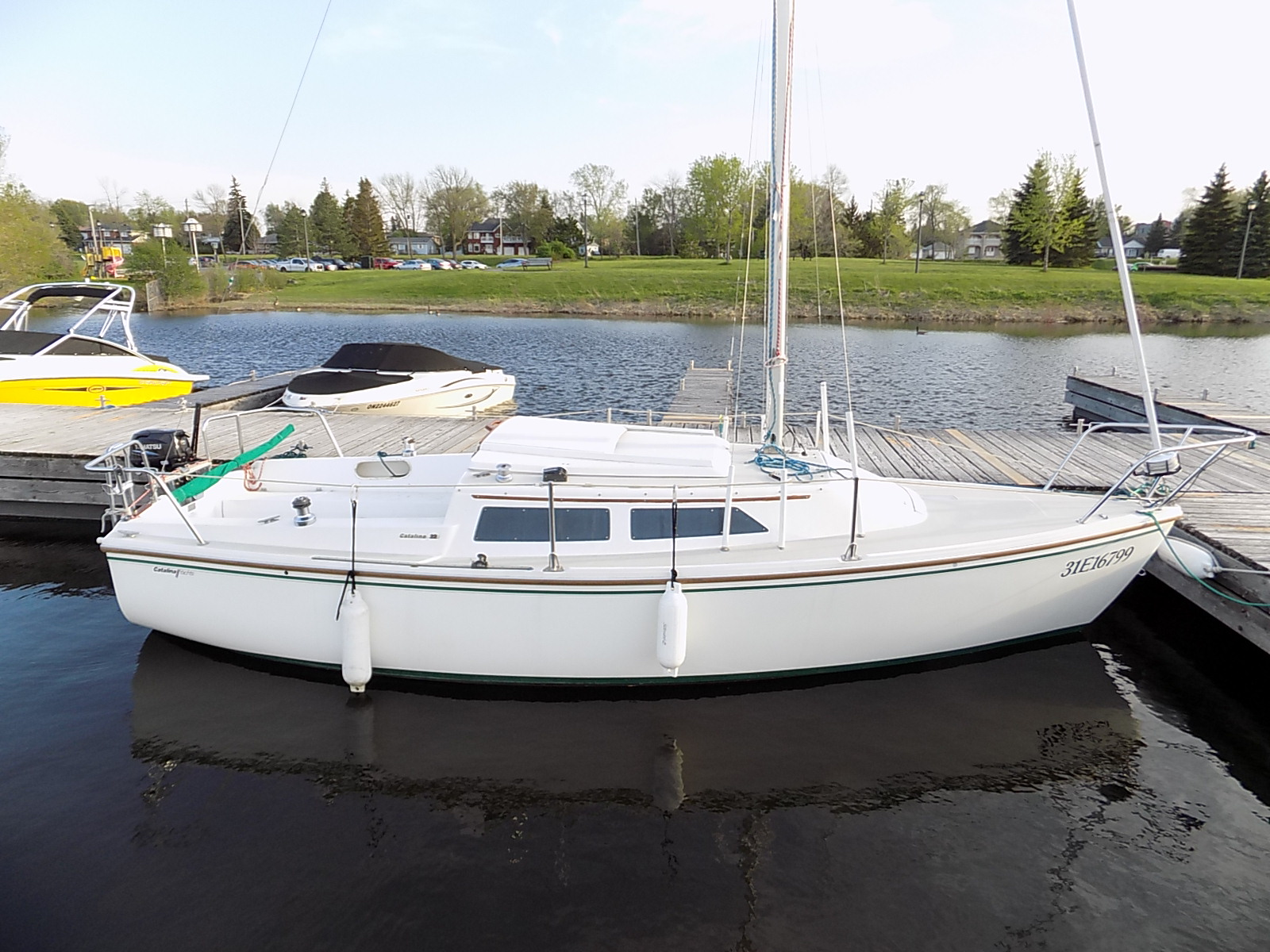
Catalina 22

== Variants ==
Catalina 22
This model was introduced in 1969. It has a length overall of 21.50 ft (6.6 m), a waterline length of 19.33 ft (5.9 m), displaces 2,490 lb (1,129 kg) and carries 800 lb (363 kg) of ballast. The boat has a draft of 5.00 ft (1.52 m) with the swing keel down and 1.67 ft (0.51 m) with the keel retracted. A fixed keel version was introduced in the 1970s. The fixed keel version of the boat has a PHRF racing average handicap of 270 with a high of 280 and low of 243. Both have hull speeds of 5.89 kn (10.91 km/h).
Catalina 22 "New Design"
This model was introduced in 1986 and produced until 1995. It features an optional wing keel.
Catalina 22 Mark II
This model was introduced in 1995 and produced until 2004. It has a length overall of 23.83 ft (7.3 m), a waterline length of 19.33 ft (5.9 m), displaces 2,290 lb (1,039 kg) and carries 765 lb (347 kg) of ballast. The boat has a draft of 3.50 ft (1.07 m) with the standard keel and 2.50 ft (0.76 m) with the optional shoal draft wing keel, while the swing-keel-equipped version has a draft of 5.00 ft (1.52 m) with the keel extended and 2.00 ft (0.61 m) with it retracted, allowing beaching or ground transportation on a trailer.
Catalina 22 Sport
This model was introduced in 2004 and remains in production. It was originally called the Capri 22 swing keel. It was built "in response to Catalina 22 owners’ requests for a production boat that more accurately reflects the original dimensions and weight of this popular one design boat..." Built with new "fairer" molds, it matches the dimensions and hull shape of the original. It has a length overall of 23.83 ft (7.3 m), a waterline length of 19.3 ft (5.9 m), displaces 2,380 lb (1,080 kg) and carries 550 lb (249 kg) of ballast. The boat has a draft of 5.00 ft (1.52 m) with the swing keel down and 1.67 ft (0.51 m) with the keel retracted. It has a hull speed of 5.9 kn (10.93 km/h). Optional equipment includes a 135% and 150% genoas, self-tailing winches and a highway trailer.

The design was named Sail magazine's "best small cruiser for trailering".
