= Cooper 416 =

Sailboat class

Development
- Designer: Stan Huntingford
- Location: Canada
- Year: 1978
- Builder: Cooper Enterprises
- Role: Cruiser
- Name: Cooper 416

Boat
- Displacement: 24,000 lb (10,886 kg)
- Draft: 6.58 ft (2.01 m)

Hull
- Type: monohull
- Construction: fibreglass
- LOA: 41.50 ft (12.65 m)
- LWL: 32.50 ft (9.91 m)
- Beam: 14.00 ft (4.27 m)
- Engine: Perkins Engines 4-108 FWC 48 hp (36 kW) diesel engine

Hull appendages
- Keel: fin keel
- Ballast: 10,500 lb (4,763 kg)
- Rudder: skeg-mounted

Rig
- Rig type: Bermuda rig
- I foretriangle height: 51.80 ft (15.79 m)
- J foretriangle base: 17.50 ft (5.33 m)
- P mainsail luff: 45.00 ft (13.72 m)
- E mainsail foot: 12.00 ft (3.66 m)

Sails
- Sailplan: masthead sloop
- Mainsail area: 270.00 sq ft (25.084 m^{2})
- Jib/genoa area: 453.25 sq ft (42.108 m^{2})
- Total sail area: 732.25 sq ft (68.028 m^{2})

The Cooper 416 is a Canadian sailboat that was designed by Stan Huntingford as a cruiser and first built in 1978.

The design was developed into the US Yachts US 42 in 1982 when the moulds were sold to Bayliner.

== Production ==
The design was built by Cooper Enterprises in Port Coquitlam, British Columbia, starting in 1978, but it is now out of production.

== Design ==
The Cooper 416 is a recreational keelboat, built predominantly of fibreglass, with wood trim. The design goals included comfortable accommodations and good sailing qualities.

The boat has a masthead sloop rig; a raked stem; a raised counter, reverse transom; a skeg-mounted rudder controlled by a wheel and a fixed fin keel. It displaces 24,000 lb (10,886 kg) and carries 10,500 lb (4,763 kg) of lead ballast.

The boat has a draft of 6.58 ft (2.01 m) with the standard keel.

The boat is fitted with a British Perkins Engines 4-108 FWC diesel engine of 48 hp (36 kW) for docking and manoeuvring. The fuel tank holds 100 U.S. gallons (380 L; 83 imp gal) of diesel fuel and the fresh water tank has a capacity of 150 U.S. gallons (570 L; 120 imp gal).

The design has sleeping accommodation for eight people, with a double "V"-berth in the bow cabin, a U-shaped settee and a straight settee in the main cabin and an aft cabin with a double berth on the starboard side and a single quarter berth on the port side. The galley is located on the starboard side amidships. The galley is U-shaped and is equipped with a four-burner stove, an ice box and a double sink. A navigation station is opposite the galley, on the port side. The head is located just aft of the bow cabin on the starboard side and includes a shower.

For sailing downwind the design may be equipped with a symmetrical spinnaker.

The design has a hull speed of 7.64 kn (14.15 km/h).

== See also ==
- List of sailing boat types

Related development

- Cooper 353
- US Yachts US 42
