= Sea Bird 37 MS =

Sailboat class

Development
- Designer: Stan Huntingford; Hardin International; Cooper Enterprises
- Location: Canada
- Year: 1973
- Builder: Cooper Enterprises
- Role: Motorsailer
- Name: Sea Bird 37 MS

Boat
- Displacement: 18,000 lb (8,165 kg)
- Draft: 4.00 ft (1.22 m)

Hull
- Type: monohull
- Construction: fibreglass
- LOA: 36.75 ft (11.20 m)
- LWL: 32.50 ft (9.91 m)
- Beam: 11.50 ft (3.51 m)
- Engine: Perkins Engines 50 hp (37 kW) diesel engine

Hull appendages
- Keel: long keel
- Ballast: 6,000 lb (2,722 kg)
- Rudder: keel-mounted rudder

Rig
- Rig type: Bermuda rig

Sails
- Sailplan: masthead sloop
- Total sail area: 560.00 sq ft (52.026 m^{2})

The Sea Bird 37 MS is a Canadian sailboat that was designed by Stan Huntingford, Hardin International and Cooper Enterprises as a motorsailer and first built in 1973.

The Sea Bird 37 MS is a development of the Sea Bird 37.

== Production ==
The design was built by Cooper Enterprises in Port Coquitlam, British Columbia, starting in 1973, but the company went out of business in 1990 and it is now out of production.

== Design ==
The Sea Bird 37 MS uses the same hull as the Sea Bird 37, but with a new deck incorporating a pilothouse designed by Forbes Cooper.

The design is a recreational keelboat, built predominantly of fibreglass, with wood trim. It has a masthead sloop rig, a raked stem, a nearly-plumb transom, a keel-hung rudder controlled by two wheels and a fixed long keel. One wheel is located in the open, aft cockpit and the other on the starboard side of the enclosed pilothouse. The boat displaces 18,000 lb (8,165 kg) and carries 6,000 lb (2,722 kg) of ballast.

Sharing the same hull and keel as the Sea Bird 37, the 37 MS has a draft of 4.00 ft (1.22 m) with the standard long keel.

The boat is fitted with a British Perkins Engines diesel engine of 50 hp (37 kW) for cruising, docking and manoeuvring. The fuel tank holds 100 U.S. gallons (380 L; 83 imp gal) and the fresh water tank has a capacity of 100 U.S. gallons (380 L; 83 imp gal).

The design has sleeping accommodation for five people, with a double "V"-berth in the bow cabin, a straight settee in the main cabin and an aft double settee berth on the port side in the pilothouse. The galley is located on the port side amidships. The galley is U-shaped and is equipped with a three-burner stove, an ice box and a sink. The pilothouse has a navigation and helm station on the starboard side. The head is located just aft of the bow cabin on the port side.

The design has a hull speed of 7.64 kn (14.15 km/h).

== Operational history ==
In a 1984 review in Yachting magazine, writer Chris Caswell described the design as, "the purest motorsailer from this company".

== See also ==
- List of sailing boat types
