= Maple Leaf 45 =

Sailboat class

Development
- Designer: Stan Huntingford
- Location: Canada
- Year: 1985
- Builder: Cooper Enterprises
- Role: Cruiser
- Name: Maple Leaf 45

Boat
- Displacement: 27,700 lb (12,565 kg)
- Draft: 6.25 ft (1.91 m)

Hull
- Type: monohull
- Construction: fibreglass
- LOA: 45.00 ft (13.72 m)
- LWL: 37.75 ft (11.51 m)
- Beam: 14.00 ft (4.27 m)
- Engine: 52 hp (39 kW) diesel engine

Hull appendages
- Keel: fin keel
- Ballast: 9,200 lb (4,173 kg)
- Rudder: skeg-mounted rudder

Rig
- Rig type: Bermuda rig

Sails
- Sailplan: masthead sloop
- Total sail area: 862.00 sq ft (80.082 m^{2})

The Maple Leaf 45 is a Canadian sailboat that was designed by Stan Huntingford as a cruiser and first built in 1985.

== Production ==
The design was built by Cooper Enterprises in Port Coquitlam, British Columbia, starting in 1985, but the company went out of business in 1990 and it is now out of production.

== Design ==
The Maple Leaf 45 is a recreational keelboat, built predominantly of fibreglass, with wood trim. The hull has a foam core, while the deck is balsa-cored. The boat has a masthead sloop rig, a raked stem, a reverse transom, a skeg-mounted rudder controlled by a wheel mounted in a mid-cockpit and a fixed fin keel. It displaces 27,700 lb (12,565 kg) and carries 9,200 lb (4,173 kg) of ballast.

The boat has a draft of 6.25 ft (1.91 m) with the standard keel.

The boat is fitted with a diesel engine of 52 hp (39 kW) for docking and manoeuvring. The fuel tank holds 125 U.S. gallons (470 L; 104 imp gal) and the fresh water tank has a capacity of 175 U.S. gallons (660 L; 146 imp gal).

The design has sleeping accommodation for seven people, with a double "V"-berth in the bow cabin, a drop-down dinette table and a straight settee in the main cabin and an aft cabin with a double berth. The galley is located on the port side just forward of the companionway ladder. The galley is U-shaped and is equipped with a three-burner stove, ice box and a double sink. A navigation station is opposite the galley, on the starboard side. There are two heads, one just aft of the bow cabin on the port side and one on the port side in the aft cabin.

The design has a hull speed of 8.23 kn (15.24 km/h).

== See also ==
- List of sailing boat types
