= Cooper Enterprises =

Sailboat builder

Cooper Enterprises Inc.
- Company type: Privately held company
- Industry: Boat building
- Founded: 1970
- Founder: Forbes Cooper
- Defunct: 1990
- Headquarters: Port Coquitlam, British Columbia, Canada
- Products: Sailboats

Cooper Enterprises Inc. (sometimes referred to as Cooper Yachts Limited) was a Canadian boat builder based in Port Coquitlam, British Columbia. The company specialized in the design and manufacture of fibreglass sailboats and powerboats.

The company was founded by Forbes Cooper in 1970 and closed in 1990.

== History ==
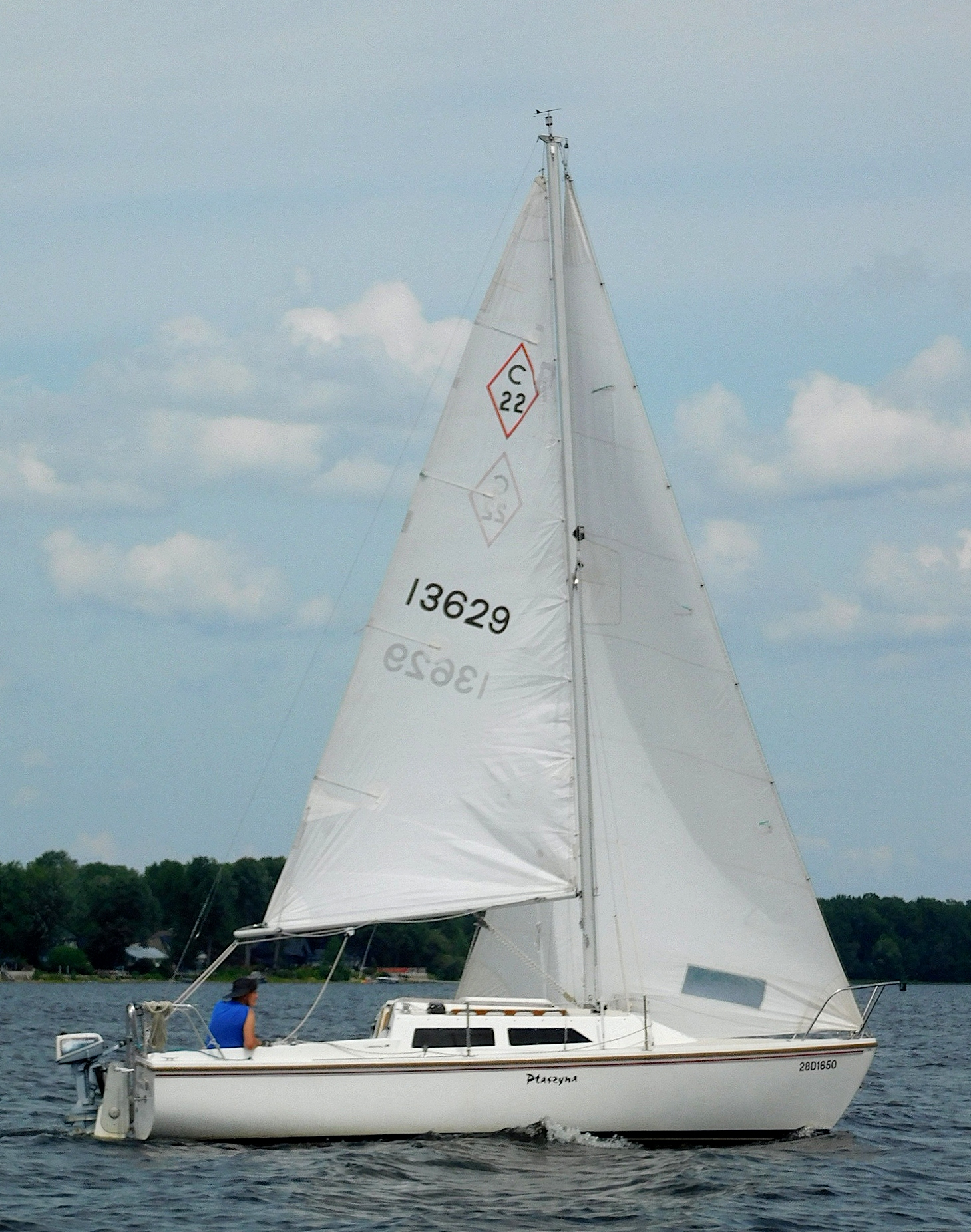
The Catalina 22 was built by Cooper Enterprises under licence from Catalina Yachts.

The company was formed to produce the designs of American sailboat builder Catalina Yachts under licence and actually built the Catalina 22 and Catalina 27 at its Port Coquitlam facility.

The company went on to produce sailboats under its own name, including the Cooper 416 in 1978 and the Cooper 353 in the following year, plus the Prowler line of motorboats. Under the name Cooper Yachts the company had sales subsidiaries in Seattle, Washington and Newport Beach, California in 1985. At least 17 sailboat designs were produced before the company ceased operations after 20 years in business, in 1990.

In a 1983 review of the company's products in Cruising World, Dan Spurr wrote, "all the Cooper yachts have a bit of a different look to them, tailored as they are to the climatic conditions in which they are built. Each seems to be a pleasant combination of form and function."

A Chris Caswell review in Yachting magazine in 1984 noted the long motoring range of the company's motorsailers. The Maple Leaf 56, for instance, has a motoring range of 1,700 nmi (3,148 km). Caswell also singled out the Sea Bird 37 MS as "the purest motorsailer from this company".

== Boats ==
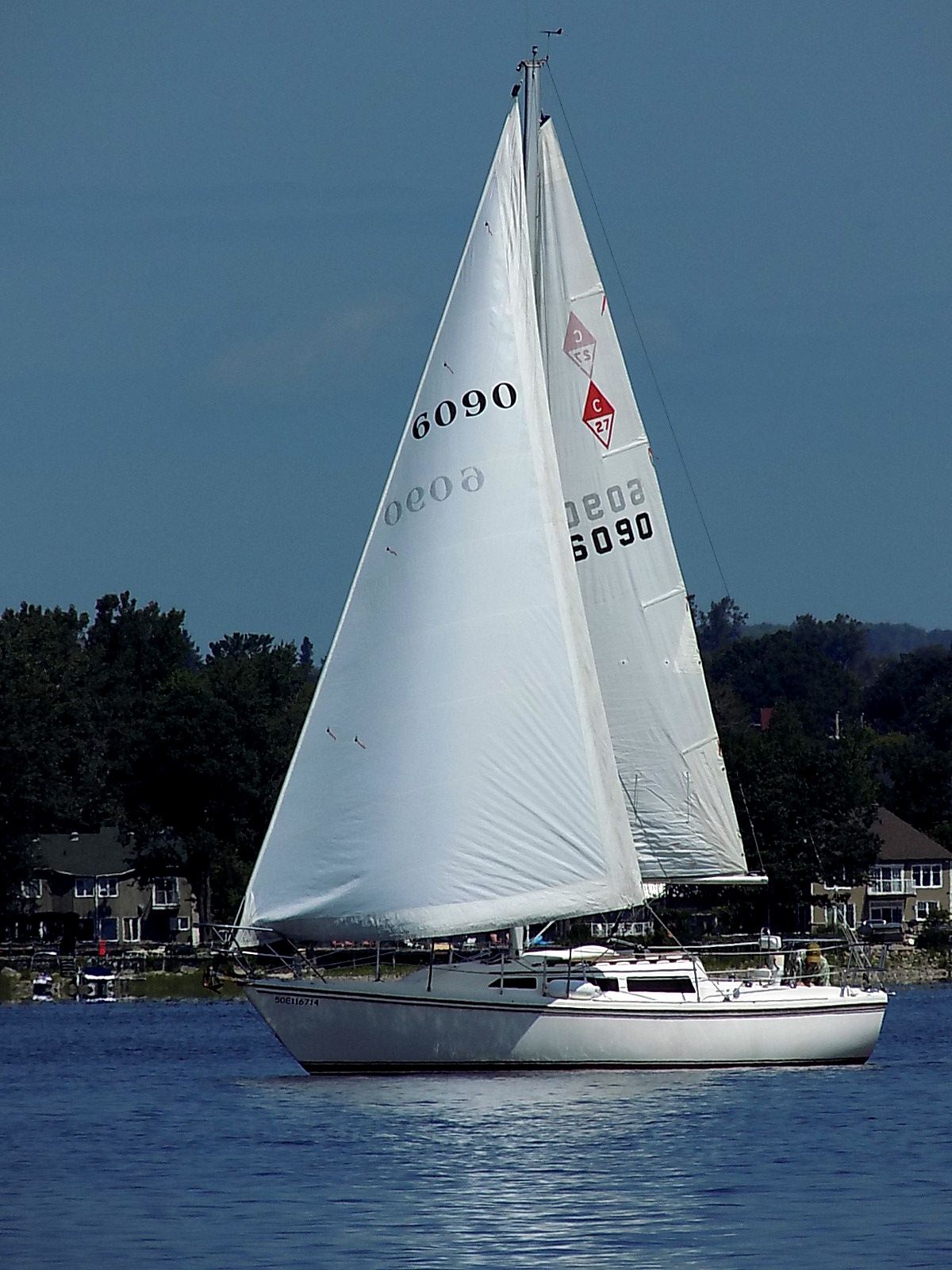
The Catalina 27, also built under licence.

Summary of boats built by Cooper Enterprises:

- Catalina 22 - 1970
- Catalina 27 - 1971
- Maple Leaf 48 - 1972
- Maple Leaf 54 - 1972
- Martin 29 - 1972
- Ganbare 35 - 1973
- Sea Bird 37 - 1973
- Sea Bird 37 MS - 1973
- Fortune 30 - 1974
- Maple Leaf 42 - 1976
- Cooper 416 - 1978
- Cooper 353 - 1979
- Cooper 508 - 1981
- Banner 32 - 1982
- Banner 37 - 1982
- Cooper 367 - 1984
- Maple Leaf 45 - 1985

== See also ==
- List of sailboat designers and manufacturers
