= Maple Leaf 42 =

Sailboat class

Development
- Designer: Stan Huntingford
- Location: Canada
- Year: 1974
- Builder: Svend's Yachts Ltd
- Role: Cruiser
- Name: Maple Leaf 42

Boat
- Displacement: 24,000 pounds (10,886 kg)
- Draft: 6.00 feet (1.83 m)

Hull
- Type: Monohull
- Construction: Fibreglass
- LOA: 42.00 feet (12.80 m)
- LWL: 35.00 feet (10.67 m)
- Beam: 13.08 feet (3.99 m)
- Engine: Inboard motor

Hull appendages
- Keel: Fixed keel or centreboard
- Ballast: 9,000 pounds (4,082 kg)
- Rudder: Skeg-mounted rudder

Rig
- Rig type: Bermuda rig
- I foretriangle height: 51.00 feet (15.54 m)
- J foretriangle base: 17.00 feet (5.18 m)
- P mainsail luff: 44.17 feet (13.46 m)
- E mainsail foot: 16.50 feet (5.03 m)

Sails
- Sailplan: Masthead sloop
- Mainsail area: 364.40 square feet (33.854 m^{2})
- Jib/genoa area: 433.50 square feet (40.273 m^{2})
- Total sail area: 797.0 square feet (74.04 m^{2})

The Maple Leaf 42 is a Canadian sailboat that was designed by Stan Huntingford as a cruiser and first built in 1974.

== Production ==
The design was built by Svend's Yachts Ltd based in North Vancouver, British Columbia, starting in 1974, but the company went out of business in 1990 and it is now out of production.

== Design ==
The Maple Leaf 42 is a recreational keelboat, built predominantly of fibreglass, with wood trim. It has a masthead sloop rig, a raked stem, a plumb transom, a skeg-mounted rudder controlled by a wheel and a fixed fin keel. It displaces 24,000 pounds (10,886 kg) and carries 9,000 pounds (4,082 kg) of ballast.

The boat has a draft of 6.00 feet (1.83 m) with the standard keel.

The design has a hull speed of 7.93 knots (14.69 km/h).

== See also ==
- List of sailing boat types
