= Ganbare 35 =

1970s IOR one-ton keelboat

Development
- Designer: Doug Peterson
- Location: Canada
- Year: 1973
- No. built: 35
- Builders: Cooper Enterprises; Martin Yachts
- Role: Racer-Cruiser
- Name: Ganbare 35

Boat
- Displacement: 13,200 lb (5,987 kg)
- Draft: 6.25 ft (1.91 m)

Hull
- Type: monohull
- Construction: fibreglass
- LOA: 35.40 ft (10.79 m)
- LWL: 28.50 ft (8.69 m)
- Beam: 11.25 ft (3.43 m)
- Engine: Farymann A30M 12 hp (9 kW) diesel engine

Hull appendages
- Keel: fin keel
- Ballast: 6,500 lb (2,948 kg)
- Rudder: internally-mounted spade-type rudder

Rig
- Rig type: Bermuda rig
- I foretriangle height: 47.00 ft (14.33 m)
- J foretriangle base: 15.30 ft (4.66 m)
- P mainsail luff: 42.00 ft (12.80 m)
- E mainsail foot: 11.30 ft (3.44 m)

Sails
- Sailplan: masthead sloop
- Mainsail area: 237.30 sq ft (22.046 m^{2})
- Jib/genoa area: 359.55 sq ft (33.403 m^{2})
- Total sail area: 596.00 sq ft (55.370 m^{2})

The Ganbare 35 is a Canadian sailboat that was designed by American Doug Peterson as an International Offshore Rule One Ton class racer-cruiser and first built in 1973.

The Ganbare 35 is a development of the one-off Petersen-designed One Ton Cup racer Ganbare. The name is derived from the Japanese term, meaning stand firm.

== Production ==
The design was built by Cooper Enterprises in Port Coquitlam, British Columbia and also by Martin Yachts, starting in 1973. A total of 35 boats were built before production ended.

== Design ==
The Ganbare 35 is a racing keelboat, built predominantly of fibreglass, with wood trim. It has a masthead sloop rig, a raked stem, a reverse transom, an internally mounted spade-type rudder controlled by a tiller and a fixed fin keel. It displaces 13,200 lb (5,987 kg) and carries 6,500 lb (2,948 kg) of lead ballast.

The boat has a draft of 6.25 ft (1.91 m) with the standard keel.

The boat is fitted with a Farymann A30M diesel engine of 12 hp (9 kW) for docking and manoeuvring. The fuel tank holds 20 U.S. gallons (76 L; 17 imp gal) and the fresh water tank has a capacity of 24 U.S. gallons (91 L; 20 imp gal).

The design has a hull speed of 7.15 kn (13.24 km/h).

== Operational history ==
The boat is supported by an active class club that organizes racing events, the One Ton Class.
