= Maple Leaf 48 =

Sailboat class

Development
- Designer: Stan Huntingford
- Location: Canada
- Year: 1972
- Builder: Cooper Enterprises
- Role: Motorsailer
- Name: Maple Leaf 48

Boat
- Displacement: 34,000 lb (15,422 kg)
- Draft: 6.50 ft (1.98 m)

Hull
- Type: monohull
- Construction: fibreglass
- LOA: 47.67 ft (14.53 m)
- LWL: 40.50 ft (12.34 m)
- Beam: 14.67 ft (4.47 m)
- Engine: 80 hp (60 kW) diesel engine

Hull appendages
- Keel: fin keel
- Ballast: 9,500 lb (4,309 kg)
- Rudder: skeg-mounted rudder

Rig
- Rig type: Bermuda rig
- I foretriangle height: 52.50 ft (16.00 m)
- J foretriangle base: 20.00 ft (6.10 m)
- P mainsail luff: 46.00 ft (14.02 m)
- E mainsail foot: 18.00 ft (5.49 m)

Sails
- Sailplan: cutter rigged sloop
- Mainsail area: 414.00 sq ft (38.462 m^{2})
- Jib/genoa area: 525.00 sq ft (48.774 m^{2})
- Total sail area: 939.00 sq ft (87.236 m^{2})

The Maple Leaf 48 is a Canadian sailboat that was designed by Stan Huntingford as a motorsailer and first built in 1972.

== Production ==
The design was built by Cooper Enterprises in Port Coquitlam, British Columbia, starting in 1972, but the company went out of business in 1990 and it is now out of production.

== Design ==
The Maple Leaf 48 is a recreational keelboat, built predominantly of fibreglass, with wood trim. It has a cutter rig, a raked stem, a reverse transom, a skeg-mounted rudder controlled by a wheel and a fixed fin keel. It displaces 34,000 lb (15,422 kg) and carries 9,500 lb (4,309 kg) of lead ballast.

The boat has a draft of 6.50 ft (1.98 m) with the standard keel and 5.5 ft (1.7 m) with the optional shoal draft keel.

The boat is fitted with an inboard diesel engine of 80 hp (60 kW) for docking and manoeuvring. The fuel tank and the fresh water tank both have capacities of 250 U.S. gallons (950 L; 210 imp gal).

The design has sleeping accommodation for nine people, with a single and a double berth in the bow cabin, a settee berth in the forward main salon, two berths in the aft main salon and an aft cabin with a double berth on the port side and a single on the starboard side. The galley is located on the port side just forward of the companionway ladder. The galley is U-shaped and is equipped with a stove and a double sink. A navigation station is opposite the galley, on the starboard side. There are two heads, one just aft of the bow cabin on the starboard side and one on the port side in the aft cabin.

For sailing downwind the design may be equipped with a symmetrical spinnaker.

The design has a hull speed of 8.53 kn (15.80 km/h).

== Operational history ==
In 1984 review in Yachting magazine, Chris Caswell wrote, "the Maple Leaf series (48, 50, 54, 56 and 68) is distinctive for powerful hulls, graceful deckhouses, and center cockpits.

== See also ==
- List of sailing boat types
