= Cooper 353 =

Sailboat class

Development
- Designer: Stan Huntingford
- Location: Canada
- Year: 1979
- Builder: Cooper Enterprises
- Role: Cruiser
- Name: Cooper 353

Boat
- Displacement: 13,000 lb (5,897 kg)
- Draft: 5.75 ft (1.75 m)

Hull
- Type: monohull
- Construction: fibreglass
- LOA: 35.00 ft (10.67 m)
- LWL: 28.50 ft (8.69 m)
- Beam: 12.00 ft (3.66 m)
- Engine: inboard motor

Hull appendages
- Keel: fin keel
- Ballast: 4,700 lb (2,132 kg)
- Rudder: skeg-mounted rudder

Rig
- Rig type: Bermuda rig
- I foretriangle height: 45.50 ft (13.87 m)
- J foretriangle base: 15.00 ft (4.57 m)
- P mainsail luff: 40.00 ft (12.19 m)
- E mainsail foot: 11.00 ft (3.35 m)

Sails
- Sailplan: masthead sloop
- Mainsail area: 220.00 sq ft (20.439 m^{2})
- Jib/genoa area: 341.25 sq ft (31.703 m^{2})
- Total sail area: 561.25 sq ft (52.142 m^{2})

The Cooper 353 is a Canadian sailboat that was designed by Stan Huntingford as a cruiser and first built in 1979.

The design was later developed into the US Yachts US 35 after Bayliner purchased the moulds for the boat.

== Production ==
The design was built by Cooper Enterprises in Port Coquitlam, British Columbia, Canada, starting in 1979, but it is now out of production.

== Design ==
The Cooper 353 is a recreational keelboat, built predominantly of fiberglass, with wood trim. It has a masthead sloop rig; a raked stem; a raised counter, reverse transom; a skeg-mounted rudder controlled by a wheel and a fixed fin keel. It displaces 13,000 lb (5,897 kg) and carries 4,700 lb (2,132 kg) of ballast.

The boat has a draft of 5.75 ft (1.75 m) with the standard keel fitted.

The boat is fitted with an inboard engine with a saildrive for docking and manoeuvring.

The design has sleeping accommodation for five people, with a double "V"-berth in the bow cabin, a U-shaped settee around a drop-down dinette table and a straight settee in the main cabin. The galley is located on the port side just forward of the companionway ladder. A navigation station is opposite the galley, on the starboard side. The head is located just aft of the bow cabin on the starboard side.

For sailing downwind the design may be equipped with a symmetrical spinnaker.

The design has a hull speed of 7.15 kn (13.24 km/h).

== See also ==
- List of sailing boat types

Related development

- Cooper 416
- US Yachts US 35
