= Maple Leaf 54 =

Sailboat class

Development
- Designer: Stan Huntingford
- Location: Canada
- Year: 1978
- Builder: Cooper Enterprises
- Role: Motorsailer
- Name: Maple Leaf 54

Boat
- Displacement: 42,000 lb (19,051 kg)
- Draft: 7.00 ft (2.13 m)

Hull
- Type: monohull
- Construction: fibreglass
- LOA: 54.25 ft (16.54 m)
- LWL: 45.25 ft (13.79 m)
- Beam: 14.92 ft (4.55 m)
- Engine: Ford Lehman 120 hp (89 kW) diesel engine

Hull appendages
- Keel: fin keel
- Ballast: 12,000 lb (5,443 kg)
- Rudder: skeg-mounted rudder

Rig
- Rig type: Bermuda rig
- I foretriangle height: 58.00 ft (17.68 m)
- J foretriangle base: 23.00 ft (7.01 m)
- P mainsail luff: 50.33 ft (15.34 m)
- E mainsail foot: 18.00 ft (5.49 m)

Sails
- Sailplan: cutter rigged sloop
- Mainsail area: 452.97 sq ft (42.082 m^{2})
- Jib/genoa area: 667.00 sq ft (61.966 m^{2})
- Total sail area: 1,119.97 sq ft (104.049 m^{2})

The Maple Leaf 54 is a Canadian sailboat that was designed by Stan Huntingford as a motorsailer and first built in 1978.

== Production ==
The design was built by Cooper Enterprises in Port Coquitlam, British Columbia, starting in 1978, but the company went out of business in 1990 and it is now out of production.

== Design ==
The Maple Leaf 54 is a recreational keelboat, built predominantly of fibreglass, with wood trim. It has a cutter rig, a raked stem, a reverse transom, a skeg-mounted rudder controlled by a wheel and a fixed fin keel. It displaces 42,000 lb (19,051 kg) and carries 12,000 lb (5,443 kg) of lead ballast.

The boat has a draft of 7.00 ft (2.13 m) with the standard keel.

The boat is fitted with a Ford Lehman diesel engine of 120 hp (89 kW) for docking and manoeuvring.

The design has sleeping accommodation for six people, with two berths in the bow cabin, two more just aft of the bow cabin and an aft cabin with a double berth. The galley is located on the port side just forward of the companionway ladder. The galley is L-shaped and is equipped with a three-burner stove and a double sink. A navigation station is opposite the galley, on the starboard side. There are two heads, one just aft of the bow cabin on the starboard side and one on the starboard side in the aft cabin.

The design has a hull speed of 9.01 kn (16.69 km/h).

== Operational history ==
In 1984 review in Yachting magazine, Chris Caswell wrote, "the Maple Leaf series (48, 50, 54, 56 and 68) is distinctive for powerful hulls, graceful deckhouses, and center cockpits.

== See also ==
- List of sailing boat types
