= Moorings 32 =

Sailboat class

Development
- Designer: Philippe Briand
- Location: France
- Year: 2002
- Builder: Jeanneau
- Role: Cruiser
- Name: Moorings 32

Boat
- Displacement: 9,700 lb (4,400 kg)
- Draft: 4.75 ft (1.45 m)

Hull
- Type: monohull
- Construction: fiberglass
- LOA: 31.58 ft (9.63 m)
- LWL: 27.92 ft (8.51 m)
- Beam: 11.00 ft (3.35 m)
- Engine: Yanmar 30 hp (22 kW) diesel engine

Hull appendages
- Keel: fin keel with weighted bulb
- Ballast: 3,020 lb (1,370 kg)
- Rudder: spade-type rudder

Rig
- Rig type: Bermuda rig

Sails
- Sailplan: fractional rigged sloop
- Total sail area: 484.00 sq ft (44.965 m^{2})

The Moorings 32 is a French sailboat that was designed by Philippe Briand as a cruiser for Moorings Yacht Charter for use as a yacht charter boat. It was first built in 2002 and served in the Moorings fleet 2006-2009. The boats are no longer in service with Moorings and many are now in private use instead.

The design is a development of the Briand-designed Sun Odyssey 32, with a deeper keel.

== Production ==
The design was built by Jeanneau in France, from 2002 to 2005, but it is now out of production.

== Design ==
The Moorings 32 is a recreational keelboat, built predominantly of fiberglass, with wood trim. It has a fractional sloop rig a nearly plumb stem, a reverse transom, an internally mounted spade-type rudder and a fixed fin keel. It displaces 9,700 lb (4,400 kg) and carries 3,020 lb (1,370 kg) of ballast.

The boat has a draft of 4.75 ft (1.45 m) with the standard keel.

The boat is fitted with a Japanese Yanmar diesel engine of 30 hp (22 kW) for docking and maneuvering. The fuel tank holds 19 U.S. gallons (72 L; 16 imp gal) and the fresh water tank has a capacity of 45 U.S. gallons (170 L; 37 imp gal).

The design has sleeping accommodation for four people, with a double "V"-berth in the bow cabin, an L-shaped settee and a straight settee in the main cabin and an aft cabin with a double berth on the port side. The galley is located on the starboard side at the companionway ladder. The galley is U-shaped and is equipped with a two-burner stove, an ice box and a sink. The head is located amidships on the port side.

The design has a hull speed of 7.08 kn (13.11 km/h).

== Operational history ==
The Moorings fleet of 32s served from 2006 to 2009 and then were sold off for private use.

== See also ==
- List of sailing boat types
