= Sun Odyssey 32 =

Sailboat class

Development
- Designer: Philippe Briand
- Location: France
- Year: 2002
- Builder: Jeanneau
- Role: Cruiser
- Name: Sun Odyssey 32

Boat
- Displacement: 9,700 lb (4,400 kg)
- Draft: 4.92 ft (1.50 m)

Hull
- Type: monohull
- Construction: fiberglass
- LOA: 31.50 ft (9.60 m)
- LWL: 27.95 ft (8.52 m)
- Beam: 10.83 ft (3.30 m)
- Engine: Yanmar 14 or 27 hp (10 or 20 kW) diesel engine

Hull appendages
- Keel: fin keel with weighted bulb
- Ballast: 3,020 lb (1,370 kg)
- Rudder: spade-type rudder

Rig
- Rig type: Bermuda rig
- I foretriangle height: 41.00 ft (12.50 m)
- J foretriangle base: 11.88 ft (3.62 m)
- P mainsail luff: 36.58 ft (11.15 m)
- E mainsail foot: 13.15 ft (4.01 m)

Sails
- Sailplan: fractional rigged sloop
- Mainsail area: 240.51 sq ft (22.344 m^{2})
- Jib/genoa area: 243.54 sq ft (22.626 m^{2})
- Total sail area: 484.05 sq ft (44.970 m^{2})

Racing
- PHRF: 153

The Sun Odyssey 32 is a French sailboat that was designed by Philippe Briand as a cruiser and first built in 2002.

The design was also developed into a yacht charter version, the Moorings 32.

== Production ==
The design was built by Jeanneau in France, from 2002 until 2005, but it is now out of production.

== Design ==
The Sun Odyssey 32 is a recreational keelboat, built predominantly of fiberglass, with wood trim. It has a fractional sloop rig, a nearly plumb stem, a reverse transom with steps, an internally mounted spade-type rudder controlled by a tiller and a fixed fin keel or optional lifting keel. The fin keel model displaces 9,700 lb (4,400 kg) and carries 3,020 lb (1,370 kg) of ballast, while the lifting keel version displaces 10,472 lb (4,750 kg) and carries 3,671 lb (1,665 kg) of ballast.

The keel-equipped version of the boat has a draft of 4.92 ft (1.50 m), while the lifting keel-equipped version has a draft of 5.5 ft (1.7 m) with the keel extended and 2.25 ft (0.69 m) with it retracted, allowing operation in shallow water.

The boat is fitted with a Japanese Yanmar diesel engine of 14 or 27 hp (10 or 20 kW) for docking and maneuvering. The fuel tank holds 19 U.S. gallons (72 L; 16 imp gal) and the fresh water tank has a capacity of 45 U.S. gallons (170 L; 37 imp gal).

The design has sleeping accommodation for four to six people, with a double "V"-berth in the bow cabin, an L-shaped settee and a straight settee in the main cabin and an aft cabin with a double berth on the port side. The galley is located on the starboard side at the companionway ladder. The galley is U-shaped and is equipped with a two-burner stove, an ice box and a sink. A navigation station is opposite the galley, on the port side. The head is located amidships, on the port side.

The design has a hull speed of 7.08 kn (13.11 km/h) and a PHRF handicap of 153.

== Operational history ==
In a 2003 review in Practical Sailor, Darrell Nicholson wrote, "we tested the SO on a balmy morning on Puget Sound. The wind built to 13 knots during our test sail (before fading away later) and she performed well with the full main and 135% genoa. In 5 knots of breeze she sailed close-hauled at 3.5 to 4.5 knots; when winds piped up to 10-13 knots speed ranged from 5 to 6.3 knots. The semi-balanced rudder and tiller produced slight weather helm at the upper range, just about right, and the boat responded quickly to every move of the tiller. At 15° of heel she settled into a comfortable groove, close to the wind, and tacked within 90°."

A 2008 review in Sailing Magazine reported, "cracking off on a broad reach and then a run, the boat felt just as fine, and it also did well when we put it through a couple of tacks and jibes. Under power the 27-horsepower diesel and two-blade prop provided plenty of oomph, and the 32 was easy to maneuver, both in forward and reverse as we worked our way in and out of the slip. In fact, as we made the dock at the end of our sail I was reminded once again just why it is that I like boats of this size, especially when they are well designed and constructed. Everybody was relaxed, no one was worn out, and idling up to the pier and securing the lines was absolutely effortless. Back on land, glancing back at the 32 it looked that much better for the fact that it had treated us so well. I had that buzz that you sometimes get at the end of a truly satisfying sail."

== See also ==
- List of sailing boat types
