= Swan 105 RS =

Sailboat class

Development
- Designer: Germán Frers; Beiderbeck Designs
- Location: Finland
- Year: 2014
- No. built: 1
- Builder: Oy Nautor AB
- Role: Cruiser
- Name: Swan 105 RS

Boat
- Displacement: 180,800 lb (82,010 kg)
- Draft: 13.12 ft (4.00 m)

Hull
- Type: monohull
- Construction: glassfibre
- LOA: 104 ft 8 in (31.90 m)
- Beam: 24 ft 3 in (7.39 m)
- Engine: Two Cummins QSL9-330HD diesel engines

Hull appendages
- Keel: Fin keel
- Rudder: Skeg-mounted/Spade-type/Transom-mounted rudder

Rig
- Rig type: Bermuda rig
- I foretriangle height: 126.97 ft (38.70 m)
- J foretriangle base: 37.20 ft (11.34 m)
- P mainsail luff: 122.38 ft (37.30 m)
- E mainsail foot: 42.49 ft (12.95 m)

Sails
- Sailplan: Fractional rigged sloop Masthead sloop
- Mainsail area: 3,229 sq ft (300.0 m^{2})
- Jib/genoa area: 2,260 sq ft (210 m^{2})
- Gennaker area: 6,781 sq ft (630.0 m^{2})
- Other sails: Code zero: 5,274 sq ft (490.0 m^{2})
- Upwind sail area: 5,489 sq ft (509.9 m^{2})
- Downwind sail area: 8,503 sq ft (790.0 m^{2})

The Swan 105 RS (Raised Salon) is a Finnish semi-custom superyacht sailboat that was designed by Germán Frers as a blue water cruiser and first built in 2014. Beiderbeck Designs of Germany did the general arrangement and the interior design.

== Production ==
The design was built by Oy Nautor AB in Finland, with construction of the first boat starting in 2012, the hull moulded in January 2013 and launched in 2014. Only one boat was built, named Ti-Coyo and delivered in October 2014. It was later renamed Child of Lir.

== Design ==
The Swan 105 RS is a recreational keelboat, built predominantly of carbon fibre and E-glass, with wood trim. The hull is made from Gurit's epoxy pre-preg-SP Resin Infusion Technology (SPRINT) sandwich material using vacuum bag moulding. It has a fractional sloop rig, with four sets of swept spreaders and carbon fibre spars. The hull has a plumb stem, a reverse transom with a drop-down tailgate swimming platform, a dinghy garage with a hydraulic launching and recovery system, two internally mounted spade-type rudders controlled by dual wheels and a factory option of a fixed fin keel, lifting keel or shoal-draft keel. It has an aft steering cockpit and an entertainment cockpit amidships, with an integrated in-deck, hydraulically operated bimini top that can be completely enclosed. It displaces about 180,800 lb (82,010 kg) empty.

The boat has a draft of 13.12 ft (4.00 m) with the standard fin keel.

The boat is fitted with two American Cummins QSL9-330HD diesel engines for docking and manoeuvring. The fuel tank holds 1,585 U.S. gallons (6,000 L; 1,320 imp gal) and the fresh water tank has a capacity of 792 U.S. gallons (3,000 L; 659 imp gal). There is also a 290 U.S. gallons (1,100 L; 240 imp gal) holding tank.

The design has sleeping accommodation for six people in three non-crew cabins. It has an aft owner's stateroom, plus two guest cabins, one with a king-sized berth and the other with two singles. Each cabin has its own head with a shower. The cabins for the four crew members are all located forward. A navigation station is located in the main salon. On the one delivered boat the dinghy garage was converted into an expanded owner's cabin, allowing the cabin to open onto the transom tailgate.

For reaching or sailing downwind the design may be equipped with a roller furling code zero sail of 5,274 sq ft (490.0 m^{2}) or an asymmetrical spinnaker of 6,781 sq ft (630.0 m^{2}).

The design complies with Germanischer Lloyd's classification and also the MCA Code.

== Operational history ==
The design was first publicly shown at the Monaco Yacht Show in September 2014.

In a 2014 Megayacht News pre-launch review, Diane M. Byrne noted, "the Swan 105 RS blends design by two notable names: Germán Frers and Beiderbeck Designs. The Frers team has long collaborated with Nautor’s Swan. Beiderbeck Design came in at the request of the owner, for the interiors and general arrangement. This Swan 105 RS is a semi-custom version of the Swan 105. She's intended as a performance cruiser with abundant enclosed and alfresco relaxation areas."

A CharterWorld review, described, the "superyacht Swan 105 features beautiful and comfortable accommodation layouts, comprising owner's cabin forward and aft for a personalised preference. The main saloon area provides plenty of light, thanks to six hull windows on each side of the hull coupled with ten deck hatches and the raised saloon windows. The raised saloon leads to the entertainment cockpit amidships. This boasts a protected area with access to the main companionway which also benefits from an elegant integrated in-deck bimini that is hydraulically operated."

== See also ==
- List of sailing boat types
