= Swan 78 =

Sailboat class

Development
- Designer: Germán Frers; Heini Gustafsson
- Location: Finland
- Year: 2018
- No. built: 5 (2019)
- Builder: Oy Nautor AB
- Role: Cruiser-Racer
- Name: Swan 78

Boat
- Displacement: 93,916 lb (42,600 kg)
- Draft: 13.12 ft (4.00 m)

Hull
- Type: monohull
- Construction: glassfibre
- LOA: 83.82 ft (25.55 m)
- LWL: 72.77 ft (22.18 m)
- Beam: 21.00 ft (6.40 m)
- Engine: 175 hp (130 kW) diesel engine

Hull appendages
- Keel: Fin keel
- Ballast: 25,573 lb (11,600 kg)
- Rudder: Dua spade-type rudders

Rig
- Rig type: Bermuda rig
- I foretriangle height: 103.67 ft (31.60 m)
- J foretriangle base: 32.05 ft (9.77 m)
- P mainsail luff: 101.71 ft (31.00 m)
- E mainsail foot: 33.63 ft (10.25 m)

Sails
- Sailplan: Fractional rigged sloop
- Mainsail area: 2,110 sq ft (196 m^{2})
- Jib/genoa area: 1,876 sq ft (174.3 m^{2})
- Upwind sail area: 3,986 sq ft (370.3 m^{2})

The Swan 78 is a Finnish sailboat that was designed by Germán Frers as a blue water cruiser-racer and first built in 2016. The interior was designed by Heini Gustafsson.

== Production ==
The preliminary design work was started in 2016 and the design has been built by Oy Nautor AB in Finland since 2018. As of 2023 it remains in production. Two boats were sold in 2016 based on drawings alone, for delivery in 2018. By 2019 five boats had been sold.

== Design ==
The Swan 78 is a recreational keelboat, built predominantly of vacuum infused glassfibre and unidirectional carbon fibre over a foam core, with wood trim, including a teak faced carbon fibre deck. It has a fractional sloop rig, with a bowsprit, three sets of swept spreaders and carbon fibre spars. A square-topped mainsail is optional. The hull has a plumb stem, a reverse transom with a drop-down tailgate swimming platform and dinghy garage, dual internally mounted spade-type rudders controlled by dual wheels and a fixed fin keel, lifting keel or optional shoal-draft keel. It displaces 93,916 lb (42,600 kg) and carries 25,573 lb (11,600 kg) of ballast. An on-deck lounge is fitted ahead of the cockpit.

The keel-equipped version of the boat has a draft of 13.12 ft (4.00 m) and 9.84 ft (3.00 m) with the optional shoal draft keel. The lifting keel-equipped version has a draft of 14.11 ft (4.30 m) with the centerboard extended and 9.84 ft (3.00 m) with it retracted, allowing operation in shallow water.

The boat is fitted with a diesel engine of 175 hp (130 kW) for docking and manoeuvring. The fuel tank holds 528 U.S. gallons (2,000 L; 440 imp gal) and the fresh water tank has a capacity of 343 U.S. gallons (1,300 L; 286 imp gal). The hot water tank holds 26 U.S. gallons (98 L; 22 imp gal).

The design has two different interior arrangements available, each with sleeping accommodation for ten people in five cabins. One interior design has the large owner's cabin with its double island berth aft, two aft midship cabins, one forward midship cabin and a bow cabin with two bunk beds. This interior has a main salon with one L-shaped and one U-shaped settee, the galley forward and five heads, one for each cabin. A navigation station is in the main salon, on the port side.

The interior with the bow owner's cabin also has a double island berth, a forward midship cabin with a double, two aft midship cabins and an aft cabin with two bunk beds. The main salon has two U-shaped settees. The galley is located on the port side, aft. There are five heads, one for each cabin.

For sailing downwind the design may be equipped with an asymmetrical spinnaker.

== Operational history ==
In a 2019 Boat International review, Sam Fortescue wrote about sailing the Swan 78, "sadly, the day of my sea trial couldn't offer more than five knots of limp northerly, but in the protected waters of the Bay of Palma, this zephyr was enough to waft the boat up to a shade more than four knots of boat speed. The super-efficient 3Di main and roller jib from North Sails held their shape well, although the wind wasn’t strong enough to trouble the spirit-level flat deck. Sail handling was a breeze, courtesy of four well-positioned Harken 990 hydraulic winches. All the control lines emerge from a conduit beneath the teak decking and feed straight on to the winch drums – a really neat set-up that can be the result only of meticulous deck layout planning. The main sheet is on a captive winch below the deck, so there is no rope to clutter the cockpit."

In a 2019 review, Yachts Croatia noted, "twenty-four meters long, the Swan 78 yacht is a beauty with clear, simple lines flowing uninterrupted; a breathtakingly elegant vessel that turns heads by style and movement."

== See also ==
- List of sailing boat types
