= Swan 54 =

Sailboat class

Development
- Designer: Germán Frers; Heini Gustafsson
- Location: Finland
- Year: 2016
- Builder: Oy Nautor AB
- Role: Cruiser
- Name: Swan 54

Boat
- Displacement: 48,502 lb (22,000 kg)
- Draft: 8.01 ft (2.44 m)

Hull
- Type: monohull
- Construction: glassfibre
- LOA: 54.07 ft (16.48 m)
- LWL: 47.24 ft (14.40 m)
- Beam: 15.58 ft (4.75 m)
- Engine: Yanmar 110 hp (82 kW) diesel engine

Hull appendages
- Keel: Fin keel
- Ballast: 18,078 lb (8,200 kg)
- Rudder: Spade-type rudder

Rig
- Rig type: Bermuda rig
- I foretriangle height: 68.47 ft (20.87 m)
- J foretriangle base: 19.52 ft (5.95 m)
- P mainsail luff: 65.88 ft (20.08 m)
- E mainsail foot: 21.98 ft (6.70 m)

Sails
- Sailplan: 19/20 Fractional rigged sloop
- Mainsail area: 873 sq ft (81.1 m^{2})
- Jib/genoa area: 665 sq ft (61.8 m^{2})
- Gennaker area: 2,260 sq ft (210 m^{2})
- Other sails: Code 0: 1,292 sq ft (120.0 m^{2})
- Upwind sail area: 1,538 sq ft (142.9 m^{2})
- Downwind sail area: 3,133 sq ft (291.1 m^{2})

The Swan 54 is a Finnish sailboat that was designed by Germán Frers as a blue water cruiser and first built in 2015. The interior was designed by Heini Gustafsson.

The boat is a development of the Swan 53 Mk II and uses the same hull design.

== Production ==
The design was announced in 2015 by the manufacturer, Oy Nautor AB of Finland, with the first customer boat delivered in July 2016. As of 2023 it remained in production.

== Design ==
The Swan 54 is a recreational keelboat, built predominantly of vinylester glassfibre over a foam core, with wooden trim, including a teak deck an oak interior. It has a 19/20 fractional sloop rig, with a keel-stepped mast, two sets of 20° swept spreaders and Seldén carbon fibre spars. The hull has a slightly raked stem, a reverse transom with a drop-down tailgate swimming platform and one or two internally mounted spade-type rudders controlled by dual wheels. It optionally has a fixed fin keel with a single rudder or stub keel and centreboard with twin rudders. The fin keel model displaces 48,502 lb (22,000 kg) empty and carries 18,078 lb (8,200 kg) of lead ballast, while the centerboard version displaces 52,801 lb (23,950 kg) empty and carries 22,377 lb (10,150 kg) of lead ballast.

The keel-equipped version of the boat has a draft of 8.01 ft (2.44 m), while the centreboard-equipped version has a draft of 12.14 ft (3.70 m) with the centreboard extended and 4.59 ft (1.40 m) with it retracted, allowing operation in shallow water.

The boat is fitted with a Japanese Yanmar diesel engine of 110 hp (82 kW) for docking and manoeuvring. The fuel tank holds 159 U.S. gallons (600 L; 132 imp gal) and the fresh water tank has a capacity of 193 U.S. gallons (730 L; 161 imp gal).

The design has sleeping accommodation for six people, with a double island berth in the bow cabin, a double berth in midship cabin, a U-shaped settee in the main cabin and an aft cabin with a double berth on the port side. The galley is located on the starboard side just forward of the companionway ladder. The galley is L-shaped and is equipped with a three-burner stove, an ice box and a double sink. A navigation station is forward the galley, on the starboard side. There are three heads, two just aft of the bow cabin on the starboard side and one on the port side in the aft cabin.

For reaching and sailing downwind the design may be equipped with an asymmetrical spinnaker of 2,260 sq ft (210 m^{2}) or a code 0 sail of 1,292 sq ft (120.0 m^{2}).

The design has a hull speed of 9.21 kn (17.06 km/h).

== Operational history ==
In an introductory 2015 review, Cruising World reported, "designed by German Frers, the Swan 54 is intended to be a pure bluewater boat as the deep V hull and contained freeboard ensure smooth sailing in rough conditions."

In a 2015 introductory review, Toby Hodges stated in Yachting World, "German Frers has given the 54 a modest shape, which might look a little dated compared with some of her competition, but should suit ocean sailing. The raked stem, fin keel and sloping transom, for example, are features we might have seen in a Frers Swan from the 1980s, but their attributes are just as relevant today. The stem should help softly part waves, while the transom cleverly folds out to produce a 2.5m bathing platform – which will be appreciated in warm anchorages."

In a 2017 review for boats.com, Rupert Holmes noted, "designed as the biggest yacht that can sensibly be sailed over long distances by two people, the Swan 54 is an appealing top quality fast cruising yacht. "

In a 2018 Cruising World review, Herb McCormick wrote, "it's in the ends of the new boat that we see the greatest changes and innovations, and they’re striking. Forward, the self-launching anchor is beyond nifty, and coupled with the gargantuan sail locker, that's one interesting bow. Aft, the boarding platform created when the wide, electrically controlled transom is lowered is nothing less than a sweet private sun deck (take that, pinched sterns of yore!). Both of these features are superbly executed."

== See also ==
- List of sailing boat types
