= Jeanneau Yachts 58 =

Sailboat class

Development
- Designer: Philippe Briand; Camillo Garroni; JF de Premorel; Jeanneau Design Office
- Location: France
- Year: 2016
- Builder: Jeanneau
- Role: Cruiser
- Name: Jeanneau Yachts 58

Boat
- Displacement: 47,289 lb (21,450 kg)
- Draft: 8.20 ft (2.50 m)

Hull
- Type: monohull
- Construction: fiberglass
- LOA: 58.33 ft (17.78 m)
- LWL: 50.20 ft (15.30 m)
- Beam: 16.40 ft (5.00 m)
- Engine: Volvo D3-110 150 hp (112 kW) diesel engine

Hull appendages
- Keel: fin keel with weighted bulb
- Ballast: 13,448 lb (6,100 kg)
- Rudder: spade-type rudder

Rig
- Rig type: Bermuda rig
- I foretriangle height: 68.90 ft (21.00 m)
- J foretriangle base: 21.92 ft (6.68 m)
- P mainsail luff: 64.27 ft (19.59 m)
- E mainsail foot: 21.00 ft (6.40 m)

Sails
- Sailplan: fractional rigged sloop
- Mainsail area: 947 sq ft (88.0 m^{2})
- Jib/genoa area: 624 sq ft (58.0 m^{2})
- Spinnaker area: 2,368 sq ft (220.0 m^{2})
- Gennaker area: 2,174 sq ft (202.0 m^{2})
- Upwind sail area: 1,572 sq ft (146.0 m^{2})
- Downwind sail area: 3,315 sq ft (308.0 m^{2})

The Jeanneau Yachts 58, also called the Jeanneau 58, is a French sailboat with a hull that was designed by Philippe Briand, the interior and deck by Camillo Garroni and finishing by JF de Premorel, with structure by the Jeanneau Design Office. It was intended as a blue water cruiser and was first built in 2016.

== Production ==
The design was built by Jeanneau in France starting in 2016, but it is now out of production.

== Design ==
The Jeanneau Yachts 58 is a recreational keelboat, built predominantly of fiberglass, with wood trim. It has a fractional sloop rig, with a keel-stepped mast, three sets of swept spreaders and aluminum spars with discontinuous Dyform rigging. The hull has a nearly-plumb stem, a reverse transom with steps and a swimming platform, an internally mounted spade-type controlled by dual wheels and an L-shaped fixed fin keel with weighted bulb or optional shoal-draft keel. The fin keel model displaces 47,289 lb (21,450 kg) empty and carries 13,448 lb (6,100 kg) of cast iron ballast, while the shoal draft version displaces 48,171 lb (21,850 kg) empty and carries 14,330 lb (6,500 kg) of cast iron ballast.

The boat has a draft of 8.20 ft (2.50 m) with the standard keel and 6.83 ft (2.08 m) with the optional shoal draft keel.

The boat is fitted with a Swedish Volvo D3-110 diesel engine of 150 hp (112 kW) for docking and maneuvering. The fuel tank holds 111 U.S. gallons (420 L; 92 imp gal) and the fresh water tank has a capacity of 246 U.S. gallons (930 L; 205 imp gal).

The design was built with a number of interior arrangements with three or four cabins and sleeping accommodation for five to nine people. One typical three-cabin arrangement has a "skipper cabin" in the bow with a single berth, a large forward cabin with a double island berth and a large aft cabin with a double island berth. The main salon has a U-shaped settee, individual chairs and a straight settee. The galley is located on the port side just forward of the companionway ladder. The galley is J-shaped and is equipped with a four-burner stove, a refrigerator, freezer and a double sink. A navigation station is opposite the galley, on the starboard side. In this arrangement that are three heads, one in each cabin, although as many as four heads may be installed. Cabin maximum headroom is 80 in (203 cm).There is also a dinghy garage under the cockpit.

For sailing downwind the design may be equipped with a symmetrical spinnaker of 2,368 sq ft (220.0 m^{2}) or an asymmetrical spinnaker of 2,174 sq ft (202.0 m^{2}).

The design has a hull speed of 9.49 kn (17.58 km/h).

== Operational history ==
In a 2017 review for Cruising World, Mark Pillsbury wrote, "We sailed the 58 on a moderate Chesapeake Bay afternoon in about 8 knots of breeze with slightly higher puffs, and like all Briand hulls, she was quick and a joy to drive, topping off at more than 6 knots hard on the breeze. Once out of the cockpit, moving about on deck was particularly easy and rewarding: There are good, high lifelines; excellent stainless-steel handholds built into the sloping coach roof; and with well-placed inboard shrouds, moving forward on the teak side decks, even with the overlapping headsail, was a breeze."

== See also ==
- List of sailing boat types
