= Swan 65 Frers =

Sailboat class

Development
- Designer: Germán Frers; Heini Gustafsson
- Location: Finland
- Year: 2018
- No. built: 7 (2019)
- Builder: Oy Nautor AB
- Role: Cruiser-Racer
- Name: Swan 65 Frers

Boat
- Displacement: 60,075 lb (27,250 kg)
- Draft: 11.48 ft (3.50 m)

Hull
- Type: monohull
- Construction: glassfibre
- LOA: 65.98 ft (20.11 m)
- LWL: 60.30 ft (18.38 m)
- Beam: 18.44 ft (5.62 m)
- Engine: Volvo D3-150 150 hp (112 kW) diesel engine

Hull appendages
- Keel: Fin keel with weighted bulb
- Ballast: 14,484 lb (6,570 kg)
- Rudder: Dual spade-type rudders

Rig
- Rig type: Bermuda rig
- I foretriangle height: 86.94 ft (26.50 m)
- J foretriangle base: 26.90 ft (8.20 m)
- P mainsail luff: 84.32 ft (25.70 m)
- E mainsail foot: 26.57 ft (8.10 m)

Sails
- Sailplan: Fractional rigged sloop
- Mainsail area: 1,312 sq ft (121.9 m^{2})
- Jib/genoa area: 1,273 sq ft (118.3 m^{2})
- Upwind sail area: 2,585 sq ft (240.2 m^{2})

The Swan 65 Frers is a Finnish sailboat that was designed by Germán Frers as a blue water cruiser-racer and first built in 2018. The interior was designed by Heini Gustafsson. The boat was first publicly shown at the BOOT Duesseldorf show.

The design was originally marketed by the manufacturer as the Swan 65, but is now usually referred to as the Swan 65 Frers to differentiate it from the unrelated 1972 Sparkman & Stephens Swan 65 design.

== Production ==
The design has been built by Oy Nautor AB in Finland, since 2018. Seven boats had been sold by the middle of 2019. As of 2023 it remains in production.

== Design ==
The Swan 65 Frers is a recreational keelboat, built predominantly of glassfibre, with wood trim. It has a fractional sloop rig with three sets of swept spreaders and a bowsprit. The hull has a plumb stem, a reverse transom with a drop-down tailgate swimming platform, a dinghy garage, dual internally mounted spade-type rudders controlled by dual wheels and a fixed fin keel or optional stub keel and centreboard. It displaces 60,075 lb (27,250 kg) empty and carries 14,484 lb (6,570 kg) of ballast.

The keel-equipped version of the boat has a draft of 11.48 ft (3.50 m), while the centerboard-equipped version has a draft of 13.78 ft (4.20 m) with the centerboard extended and 9.19 ft (2.80 m) with it retracted, allowing operation in shallow water.

The boat is fitted with a Swedish Volvo D3-150 diesel engine of 150 hp (112 kW) for docking and manoeuvring. It also has an Onan MDKDN 230 volt 11 kW 50 Hz diesel generator. The fuel tank holds 317 U.S. gallons (1,200 L; 264 imp gal) and the fresh water tank has a capacity of 264 U.S. gallons (1,000 L; 220 imp gal).

The design has a choice of two interior configurations, both with three cabins. One has the owner's cabin aft and another locates it forward. Both have sleeping accommodation for six people. The aft owner's cabin arrangement has two forward cabins, one with a double berth to port and the starboard one with two bunk beds. It has a U-shaped and an L-shaped settee in the main salon and an aft cabin with a central double island berth. The other interior has the owner's cabin in the bow with the central island berth and two aft cabins, each with two single bunks. The forward sail locker can also be converted into a crew cabin. In both interiors the U-shaped galley is located on the port side, forward. A navigation station is on the starboard side just abeam the companionway. There are three heads, one for each cabin.

For sailing downwind the design may be equipped with an asymmetrical spinnaker.

The boat has a hull speed of 10.41 kn (19.28 km/h).

== Operational history ==
In a 2019 review, Toby Hodges wrote for Yachting World, "the Swan 65 grows on you – the longer you sail it the more you enjoy it. Cruising sailors don’t seek an adrenaline rush, they want an enduring relationship built on easy rewards and dependability. This is a powerful boat, which is easy to sail fast but will be most gratifying when trimmed to keep it on its preferred low heel angle. Take the wheel and it's hard not to daydream about how pleasant those consistent speeds and heeling angles would feel on a tradewind ocean crossing."

In a 2019 review, Lars Reisberg critiqued the interior layout, "from my personal point of view, the new Swan 65 shows exactly this 'cluelessness' as I would call it: Offering no less than 3 areas in this one salon where people can sit down, have a drink and a chat and relax is ridiculous in my eyes: Who needs so many tables and sofas? That´s my biggest critique on this boat, I really pity this layout of the salon because I don't feel that the volume that was available has been utilized properly. Instead, the salon is peppered with different areas offering exactly the same ... But I fear there's no concept in all this. I found it particularly confusing. Might be that on this boat more than 10 people roam about. Okay, in this case the owner´s family might be happy to have so many possibilities to have the people sitting down. In my opinion, it's oversized. The boat simply cannot cope with the amount of given volume."

== See also ==
- List of sailing boat types
