= Swan 120 =

Sailboat class

Development
- Designer: Germán Frers; Misa Poggi
- Location: Finland
- Year: 2021
- No. built: 2
- Builder: Oy Nautor AB
- Role: Cruiser-Racer
- Name: Swan 120

Boat
- Displacement: 218,258 lb (99,000 kg)
- Draft: 15.42 ft (4.70 m)

Hull
- Type: monohull
- Construction: glassfibre
- LOA: 124.48 ft (37.94 m)
- LWL: 107.74 ft (32.84 m)
- Beam: 26.64 ft (8.12 m)
- Engine: Scania AB DL13 081M 450 hp (336 kW) diesel engine

Hull appendages
- Keel: Fin keel
- Ballast: 67,461 lb (30,600 kg)
- Rudder: Dual spade-type rudders

Rig
- Rig type: Bermuda rig
- I foretriangle height: 145.73 ft (44.42 m)
- J foretriangle base: 45.44 ft (13.85 m)
- P mainsail luff: 141.08 ft (43.00 m)
- E mainsail foot: 46.26 ft (14.10 m)

Sails
- Sailplan: Fractional rigged sloop
- Mainsail area: 3,880 sq ft (360 m^{2})
- Other sails: optional square-topped mainsail: 4,209 sq ft (391.0 m^{2})

The Swan 120 is a Finnish superyacht that was designed by Germán Frers as a cruiser-racer and first built in 2021. The interior was designed by Misa Poggi.

== Production ==
The design was announced in October 2018. It has been built by Oy Nautor AB in Finland, since 2021, with two boats produced. As of 2023, it remains in production. The design was publicly shown at the 2021 Monaco Yacht Show.

The first boat produced, Audrey the First, has a custom interior design by Mark Whiteley.

== Design ==
The Swan 120 is a recreational keelboat, built predominantly of pre-preg SPRINT epoxy carbon fibre, with an M-grade Corecell foam core and wood trim, including a teak-faced deck. It has a fractional sloop rig with an optional short or long bowsprit. It has four sets of swept spreaders and carbon fibre spars. The hull has a plumb stem, a reverse transom with a drop-down tailgate swimming platform, dinghy hangar, dual internally mounted spade-type rudders controlled by dual wheels and a fixed fin keel or optional telescopic keel. The anchor is dropped and raised from a hydraulically actuated arm. The boat displaces 218,258 lb (99,000 kg) and carries 67,461 lb (30,600 kg) of ballast.

The fin keel-equipped version of the boat has a draft of 15.42 ft (4.70 m), while the telescopic keel-equipped version has a draft of 18.04 ft (5.50 m) with the keel extended and 11.48 ft (3.50 m) with it retracted, allowing operation in shallow water.

The boat is fitted with a Swedish Scania AB DL13 081M diesel engine of 450 hp (336 kW) for docking and manoeuvring. It also has two 230/400 V 32 kW 3-phase diesel generators.

The design has sleeping accommodation for 14 people in seven cabins, with several interior arrangement options. In the factory standard configuration there are two cabins in the bow, each with bunk beds, two mid-forward cabins, each with a double berth, two midship cabins, each with two single berths and an owner's suite aft, with a double island berth and an L-shaped settee. The main salon has a U-shaped settee and a straight settee. The galley is located on the starboard side, forward. The galley is C-shaped and is equipped with a four-burner stove, a refrigerator, freezer and a double sink. There are seven heads, one for each cabin.

For sailing downwind the design may be equipped with a asymmetrical spinnaker flown from the optional bowsprit.

== Operational history ==
In a 2021 review, Yachting World noted, "deck lounging space has clearly been a key criteria of the design. The vast guest cockpit is adorned with multiple sofas and can be protected by a bimini and sprayhood which rise out of a coachroof cassette at the push of a button. A 1.8m-wide companionway of curved glass then eases you into the deck saloon where there are vast daybeds adjacent to the large hull portlights."

== See also ==
- List of sailing boat types
