= Swan 66 =

Sailboat class

Swan 66 S
Development
- Designer: Germán Frers
- Location: Finland
- Year: 2006
- Builder: Oy Nautor AB
- Role: Cruiser-Racer
- Name: Swan 66 S

Boat
- Displacement: 66,000 lb (29,937 kg)
- Draft: 10.50 ft (3.20 m)

Hull
- Type: monohull
- Construction: glassfibre
- LOA: 66.01 ft (20.12 m)
- LWL: 56.40 ft (17.19 m)
- Beam: 17.68 ft (5.39 m)
- Engine: Yanmar 163 hp (122 kW) diesel engine

Hull appendages
- Keel: Fin keel
- Ballast: 20,720 lb (9,398 kg)
- Rudder: Spade-type rudder

Rig
- Rig type: Bermuda rig
- I foretriangle height: 90.22 ft (27.50 m)
- J foretriangle base: 24.44 ft (7.45 m)
- P mainsail luff: 82.68 ft (25.20 m)
- E mainsail foot: 24.93 ft (7.60 m)

Sails
- Sailplan: Masthead sloop
- Mainsail area: 1,309 sq ft (121.6 m^{2})
- Jib/genoa area: 1,038 sq ft (96.4 m^{2})
- Upwind sail area: 2,347 sq ft (218.0 m^{2})

The Swan 66 is a series of Finnish sailboats that were designed by Germán Frers as a cruiser-racers and first built in 2006. The boat was produced in the Swan 66 S (salon) and FD (flush deck) models. Both use the same hull design but different decks, and were introduced as part of celebrations of the builder's 40th anniversary.

== Production ==
The design was built by Oy Nautor AB in Finland, from 2006 to 2017, but it is now out of production.

== Design ==
The Swan 66 is a recreational keelboat, built predominantly of vinylester glassfibre over a PVC core, with carbon fibre reinforcement and wooden trim. It has a masthead sloop rig, with a keel-stepped mast, three sets of swept spreaders and carbon fibre spars with stainless steel rod standing rigging. The hull has a slightly raked stem, a reverse transom with a drop-down tailgate swimming platform, an internally mounted spade-type rudder controlled by dual carbon fibre wheels and a fixed fin keel. The boat has a dinghy garage located under the cockpit. It displaces 66,000 lb (29,937 kg) and carries 20,720 lb (9,398 kg) of lead ballast.

The "S" model has a high coach house, while the "FD" has a walk-over cabin top.

The boat has a draft of 10.50 ft (3.20 m) with the standard keel.

The "FD" model is fitted with an Austrian Steyr Motors GmbH MO166K28 6-cylinder 160 hp (119 kW) diesel engine, while the "S" model has a Yanmar 163 hp (122 kW) diesel engine for docking and manoeuvring. The fuel tank holds 211 U.S. gallons (800 L; 176 imp gal) and the fresh water tank has a capacity of 264 U.S. gallons (1,000 L; 220 imp gal).

Interior layouts vary, but typical is sleeping accommodation for six people in four cabins, with a double berth in the forward cabin, Two midship cabins, one with a single and one with a double, two L-shaped settees in the main cabin and an aft cabin with a single berth on the starboard side. The galley is located on the port side aft of the companionway ladder. The galley is C-shaped and is equipped with a four-burner stove, an ice box and a double sink. A navigation station is located in the main cabin, on the starboard side. There are four heads, one for each cabin.

For sailing downwind the design may be equipped with a asymmetrical spinnaker.

The design has a hull speed of 10.06 kn (18.63 km/h).

== Operational history ==
In a 2011 Sail Magazine review, Charles J. Doane wrote, "you can order a Swan 66 in either an FD (flush deck) configuration, like Lionessa, or as an S (deck saloon) model. I rather prefer the FD boat, precisely because its lines strongly recall those of earlier Swans. The deck, in fact, is not perfectly flush, but functionally so, as the slim wedge of the full-length cabinhouse, so evocative of Swans past, is visually noticeable, but not physically apparent when you are actually working the deck. The S model, by comparison, carries a bolder imprimatur of Italian styling. The deck is truly flush from the stem as far back as the mast, then comes the raised blister of the saloon deckhouse, which blends seamlessly into one large unitary cockpit that inhabits the back third of the boat. Down below, you'll find the saloon itself is not raised. The large saloon windows no doubt do let in a lot of light, but unless you are tall, they'll do little to expand the view from within. The interior trim is also more Euro contemporary, with less teak and more open stark-white surfaces."

In a 2012 review for Yachting, Dennis Caprio described sailing the FD model, "we found her groove at 28 degrees to the apparent wind on one tack, but the conditions changed frequently. At one point, we saw 15 knots of wind aloft and almost nothing at the surface. She seemed happiest to me sailing at 33 to 35 degrees to the apparent wind in these gusty conditions. Our speed over the ground fluctuated between 9 and 10 knots."

== See also ==
- List of sailing boat types
