= Sun Odyssey 410 =

Sailboat class

Development
- Designer: Marc Lombard; Jean-Marc Piaton
- Location: France
- Year: 2018
- Builder: Jeanneau
- Role: Cruiser
- Name: Sun Odyssey 410

Boat
- Displacement: 17,161 lb (7,784 kg)
- Draft: 7.00 ft (2.13 m)

Hull
- Type: monohull
- Construction: fiberglass
- LOA: 42.49 ft (12.95 m) with bowsprit
- LWL: 38.42 ft (11.71 m)
- Beam: 13.09 ft (3.99 m)
- Engine: Yanmar 40 or 45 hp (30 or 34 kW) diesel engine

Hull appendages
- Keel: fin keel with weighted bulb
- Ballast: 4,416 lb (2,003 kg)
- Rudder: dual spade-type rudder

Rig
- Rig type: Bermuda rig
- I foretriangle height: 48 ft 8 in (14.83 m)
- J foretriangle base: 15 ft 4 in (4.67 m)
- P mainsail luff: 49 ft 7 in (15.11 m)
- E mainsail foot: 16 ft 5 in (5.00 m)

Sails
- Sailplan: 9/10 fractional rigged sloop
- Mainsail area: 830 sq ft (77 m^{2})
- Jib/genoa area: 369 sq ft (34.3 m^{2})
- Upwind sail area: 830 sq ft (77 m^{2})

The Sun Odyssey 410 is a French cruising sailboat with a hull designed by Marc Lombard and interior by Jean-Marc Piaton, first built in 2018.

The design debuted at the 2018 Annapolis Boat Show and was named the 2019 Cruising World - Boat of the Year: Midsize Cruiser.

== Production ==
The design has been built by Jeanneau in France, since 2018 and remains in production in 2023.

== Design ==
The Sun Odyssey 410 is a recreational keelboat, built predominantly of polyester fiberglass, with wood trim. The hard chined hull is solid fiberglass, while the deck is an injection molded fiberglass-foam sandwich. It has a 9/10 fractional sloop rig with a bowsprit, a deck-stepped mast, two sets of swept spreaders and aluminum spars made by Z-Spar, with discontinuous 1X19 stainless steel wire rigging and Technique Voile sails. The hull has a reverse stem], a slightly reverse transom with a drop-down tailgate swimming platform, dual internally mounted spade-type rudders controlled by two wheels and a fixed L-shaped fin keel, optional shoal-draft keel or lifting keel.

Options include an in-mast furling mainsail, an 11 in (28 cm) taller mast and square-topped mainsail and a retractable bow thruster.

The fin keel model displaces 17,161 lb (7,784 kg) empty and carries 4,416 lb (2,003 kg) of cast iron ballast, the shoal draft version displaces 17,873 lb (8,107 kg) empty and carries 5,128 lb (2,326 kg) of cast iron ballast and the lifting keel version displaces 16,729 lb (7,588 kg) and carries 3,984 lb (1,807 kg) of cast iron ballast.

The boat has a draft of 7 ft 0 in (2.13 m) with the standard keel and 5 ft 2 in (1.57 m) with the optional shoal draft keel, while the lifting keel-equipped version has a draft of 9 ft 8 in (2.95 m) with the keel extended and 4 ft 6 in (1.37 m) with it retracted, allowing operation in shallow water.

The boat is fitted with a Japanese Yanmar diesel engine of 40 or 45 hp (30 or 34 kW) for docking and maneuvering. The fuel tank holds 52 U.S. gallons (200 L; 43 imp gal) and the fresh water tank has a capacity of 139 U.S. gallons (530 L; 116 imp gal).

The design has a number if different interior configurations, with sleeping accommodation for four to six people, in two or three cabin layouts. The two cabin interior has a double island berth in the bow cabin, an L-shaped settee and a straight settee in the main cabin and an aft cabin with a double berth on the starboard side, with a storage area to port. The three cabin interior uses the storage area as a cabin. The galley is located on the port side, amidships. The galley is L-shaped and is equipped with a three-burner stove, a refrigerator and freezer, and a double sink. A navigation station is aft of the galley, on the port side. The head is located amidships on the starboard side and includes a shower. A second head may be added to the bow cabin, in which case the bunk is angled to accommodate. Cabin headroom is 78 in (198 cm).

For sailing downwind the design may be equipped with an asymmetrical spinnaker or a code 0 sail flown from the bowsprit.

The design has a hull speed of 8.22 kn (15.22 km/h).

== Operational history ==
The boat is supported by an active class club the Jeanneau Owners Network.

In a 2018 review, Zuzana Prochazka wrote, "unfortunately, our test would have made even the most lax club race seem boisterous as we hoisted sail on the flat waters of the Chesapeake in a breeze that occasionally gusted to nine knots. Undaunted by the weather, we managed to have fun and point high despite the fluky wind. At 35 degrees apparent wind angle, we managed to sail 5.2 knots in nine knots of true breeze. When we cracked off to 120 degrees, we still carried 3.7 knots of boat speed and then we came back up to five knots at 65 degrees."

In a 2019 review for Cruising World, Herb McCormick wrote, "over the years, Jeanneau has built at least seven or eight iterations of their 40-foot offering, so it’s only fair to ask, how different can each successive version be? The answer, stated emphatically with their new Sun Odyssey 410, is that an evolved, inspired design can be incredibly unique and atypical of everything that preceded it."

In a 2021 Sail Magazine review, Charles J. Doane wrote, "with its multiplicity of layout and rig options, not to mention a choice between shoal and deep-draft keels, the Jeanneau Sun Odyssey 410 is a remarkably versatile boat."

In June 2024, the Sun Odyssey 410, along with the 440 and 490, was recalled due to faulty bow thrusters resulting in some cases of sinking.

== See also ==
- List of sailing boat types
