= Swan 58 =

Sailboat class

Development
- Designer: Germán Frers; Misa Poggi
- Location: Finland
- Year: 2020
- Builder: Oy Nautor AB
- Role: Cruiser
- Name: Swan 58

Boat
- Displacement: 55,997 lb (25,400 kg)
- Draft: 8.86 ft (2.70 m)

Hull
- Type: monohull
- Construction: glassfibre
- LOA: 62.70 ft (19.11 m)
- LOH: 58.92 ft (17.96 m)
- LWL: 56.07 ft (17.09 m)
- Beam: 17.29 ft (5.27 m)
- Engine: Volvo D3-150 150 hp (112 kW) diesel engine

Hull appendages
- Keel: Fin keel with weighted bulb
- Ballast: 16,534 lb (7,500 kg)
- Rudder: Dual spade-type rudders

Rig
- Rig type: Bermuda rig
- I foretriangle height: 83.66 ft (25.50 m)
- J foretriangle base: 23.65 ft (7.21 m)
- P mainsail luff: 79.72 ft (24.30 m)
- E mainsail foot: 25.26 ft (7.70 m)

Sails
- Sailplan: Fractional rigged sloop
- Mainsail area: 1,253 sq ft (116.4 m^{2})
- Jib/genoa area: 1,051 sq ft (97.6 m^{2})
- Gennaker area: 3,595 sq ft (334.0 m^{2})
- Upwind sail area: 2,304 sq ft (214.0 m^{2})
- Downwind sail area: 4,848 sq ft (450.4 m^{2})

The Swan 58 is a Finnish sailboat that was designed by Germán Frers, with the interior design by Misa Poggi. It was intended as a blue water cruiser and first built in 2020.

== Production ==
The design has been built by Oy Nautor AB in Finland, since 2020. The first hull was removed from the mould in April 2020. As of 2023 it remains in production.

== Design ==
The Swan 58 is a recreational keelboat, built predominantly of vinylester vacuum-infused glassfibre with carbon fibre reinforcement and with wood trim, including a teak faced deck. It has a fractional sloop rig with a bowsprit, with three sets of swept spreaders and carbon fibre spars. The hull has a plumb stem, a reverse transom with a drop-down tailgate swimming platform, dual internally mounted spade-type rudders controlled by dual wheels and a fixed fin keel with a weighted bulb, deep draft keel or shoal-draft keel. A bow thruster is mounted forward. It displaces 55,997 lb (25,400 kg) empty and carries 16,534 lb (7,500 kg) of ballast.

The boat has a draft of 8.86 ft (2.70 m) with the standard fin keel, 12.47 ft (3.80 m) with the deep draft keel and 7.22 ft (2.20 m) with the optional shoal draft keel.

The boat is fitted with a Swedish Volvo D3-150 diesel engine of 150 hp (112 kW) for docking and manoeuvring. The fuel tank holds 285 U.S. gallons (1,080 L; 237 imp gal) and the fresh water tank has a capacity of 250 U.S. gallons (950 L; 210 imp gal).

The boat is available with a number of different interior arrangements, with three or four cabins. A typical three cabin design has sleeping accommodation for six people, with a double island berth in the bow cabin, a U-shaped settee plus two seats in the main cabin and two aft cabins, each with two single berths. The galley is located on the port side just forward of the companionway ladder. The galley is C-shaped and is equipped with a four-burner stove, a refrigerator, freezer and a double sink. A navigation station is opposite the galley, on the starboard side. There are three heads, one for each cabin.

For reaching and sailing downwind the boat may be equipped with a 3,695 sq ft (343.3 m^{2}) gennaker or a code 0 sail. The design has a hull speed of 10.03 kn (18.58 km/h).

== Operational history ==
In a 2020 Sail Universe review noted, this is "a proper bluewater yacht, with all the features for this purpose, but without any compromise in terms of performance."

In a 2021 introductory article for Yachting World, Rupert Holmes wrote, "the cockpit looks beautifully uncluttered, with a clear passage from the transom and helm stations to the companionway. On the other hand some will be disappointed by the positioning of winches and clutches outboard of the cockpit benches, rather than inboard on pedestals ahead of the wheels."

In a 2022 Yachting World review, Rupert Holmes noted, "Nautor is billing the Swan 58 as a 'new bluewater concept'. The idea is that the priorities of safety, comfort and autonomy don't compromise performance, or the pleasure of helming the boat. This model is also pitched as a proper bluewater cruiser that a couple can reasonably sail and look after themselves, without a professional skipper."

== See also ==
- List of sailing boat types
