= Swan 98 =

Sailboat class

Development
- Designer: Germán Frers; Misa Poggi
- Location: Finland
- Year: 2020
- No. built: 3
- Builder: Oy Nautor AB
- Role: Cruiser-Racer
- Name: Swan 98

Boat
- Displacement: 139,112 lb (63,100 kg)
- Draft: 14.44 ft (4.40 m)

Hull
- Type: monohull
- Construction: carbon fibre
- LOA: 101.87 ft (31.05 m) with optional bowsprit
- LOH: 97.11 ft (29.60 m)
- LWL: 87.37 ft (26.63 m)
- Beam: 22.87 ft (6.97 m)
- Engine: Cummins QSB6.7 305 hp (227 kW) diesel engine

Hull appendages
- Keel: Fin keel
- Ballast: 48,502 lb (22,000 kg)
- Rudder: Dual spade-type rudders

Rig
- Rig type: Bermuda rig
- I foretriangle height: 121.72 ft (37.10 m)
- J foretriangle base: 36.25 ft (11.05 m)
- P mainsail luff: 122.47 ft (37.33 m)
- E mainsail foot: 38.39 ft (11.70 m)

Sails
- Sailplan: Fractional rigged sloop
- Mainsail area: 2,879.35 sq ft (267.500 m^{2})
- Gennaker area: 10,764 sq ft (1,000.0 m^{2})

The Swan 98 is a Finnish maxi yacht that was designed by Germán Frers as a cruiser-racer and first built in 2020. The interior was designed by Misa Poggi.

== Production ==
The design was announced in May 2018 by builder Oy Nautor AB in Finland, with three boats on order by 2019. Construction of the first boat was started in 2018 and it was delivered in July 2020. It was first shown at the 2021 Monaco Yacht Show. As of 2023 the design remains in production.

== Design ==
The Swan 98 is a recreational keelboat, built predominantly of pre-preg carbon fibre over a core of Corecell foam, with wood trim, including a teak-faced deck. It has a fractional sloop rig, with three sets of swept spreaders and carbon fibre spars with airfoil-shaped carbon fibre standing rigging. The hull has a plumb stem, a reverse transom with a hydraulically controlled drop-down tailgate swimming platform, a dinghy garage, dual internally mounted spade-type rudders controlled by dual wheels and a fixed fin keel or optional telescopic keel. The bow anchor is deployed from a hydraulic folding arm. The boat displaces 139,112 lb (63,100 kg) empty and carries 48,502 lb (22,000 kg) of ballast.

There is a racing package that includes an optional longer bowsprit, running backstays and square-topped mainsail. Boats can be built for racing, cruising or both roles. For sailing downwind the design may be equipped with a masthead asymmetrical spinnaker of 10,764 sq ft (1,000.0 m^{2}) flown from the bowspit.

The fin keel-equipped version of the boat has a draft of 14.44 ft (4.40 m), while the telescopic keel-equipped version has a draft of 16.08 ft (4.90 m) with the keel extended and 10.50 ft (3.20 m) with it retracted, allowing operation in shallow water.

The boat is fitted with an American Cummins QSB6.7 305 hp (227 kW) diesel engine, plus a retractable bow thruster for docking and manoeuvring. It also has a Northern Light M864W3 230 V 20 kW 50 Hz diesel generator. The fuel tank holds 793 U.S. gallons (3,000 L; 660 imp gal).

The design has two different interior arrangements, but typical is one with sleeping accommodation for 12 people in six cabins. There two cabins forward, each with two bunk beds, one forward midship cabin with a double berth, two midship aft cabins, each with two singles and an aft owner's cabin with a double island berth and a walk-in closet. The alternative interior has the owner's cabin in the bow. There is a U-shaped settee and a straight settee in the main salon. The galley is located on the port side, forward. The galley is C-shaped and is equipped with a four-burner stove, a refrigerator, freezer and a double sink. There are six heads, one for each cabin.

== See also ==
- List of sailing boat types
