= Swan 95 =

Sailboat class

Swan 95 S
Development
- Designer: Germán Frers
- Location: Finland
- Year: 2015
- No. built: at least one
- Builder: Oy Nautor AB
- Role: Cruiser-Racer
- Name: Swan 95 S

Boat
- Displacement: 130,293 lb (59,100 kg)
- Draft: 14 ft 5 in (4.39 m)

Hull
- Type: monohull
- Construction: glassfibre
- LOH: 94 ft 8 in (28.85 m)
- LWL: 87 ft 1 in (26.54 m)
- Beam: 22 ft 7 in (6.88 m)
- Engine: Steyr Motors GmbH SE236E40 231 hp (172 kW) diesel engine

Hull appendages
- Keel: Fin keel
- Ballast: 44,092 lb (20,000 kg)
- Rudder: Dual spade-type rudders

Rig
- Rig type: Bermuda rig
- I foretriangle height: 125 ft 4 in (38.20 m)
- J foretriangle base: 38 ft 6 in (11.73 m)
- P mainsail luff: 124 ft 5 in (37.92 m)
- E mainsail foot: 37 ft 5 in (11.40 m)

Sails
- Sailplan: 9/10 Fractional rigged sloop
- Mainsail area: 2,951 sq ft (274.2 m^{2})
- Jib/genoa area: 2,333 sq ft (216.7 m^{2})
- Upwind sail area: 5,284 sq ft (490.9 m^{2})

The Swan 95 is a Finnish semi-custom maxi yacht sailboat that was designed by Germán Frers as a cruiser-racer and first built in 2015, with first customer delivery in 2017. The design has two different deck configurations, the Swan 95 FD (flush deck) for racing and the Swan 95 S (raised salon) for cruising. The design is evolved from the Swan 90.

== Production ==
The design was built by Oy Nautor AB in Finland, from 2015 until 2019, but it is now out of production. Only one of the "S" models was produced, hull number one. Named Lot 99, it was launched in May 2017 for a Dutch customer.

== Design ==
The Swan 95 is a recreational keelboat, built predominantly of carbon fibre sandwich construction, with wood trim including a teak deck overlay. It has a 9/10 fractional sloop rig, with a keel-stepped mast, four sets of swept spreaders and Hall Spars carbon fibre spars. The hull has a plumb stem, a reverse transom with a drop-down tailgate swimming platform and dinghy garage, dual internally mounted spade-type rudders controlled by dual wheels and a fixed fin keel or optional hydraulically actuated lifting keel. It displaces 130,293 lb (59,100 kg) and carries 44,092 lb (20,000 kg) of ballast.

The boat has a draft of 14 ft 5 in (4.39 m) with the lifting keel extended. With it retracted, the boat can be operated in shallow water.

The boat is fitted with an Austrian Steyr Motors GmbH SE236E40 of 231 hp (172 kW) for docking and manoeuvring. The fuel tank holds 660.4 U.S. gallons (2,500 L; 549.9 imp gal) and the fresh water tank has a capacity of 317 U.S. gallons (1,200 L; 264 imp gal). It also has a 171.7 U.S. gallons (650 L; 143.0 imp gal) holding tank.

Interiors are custom, but typical is one with sleeping accommodation for 12 people in six cabins, with two forward cabins, each with two bunk beds, a mid-forward cabin on the starboard side with two bunk beds, two L-shaped settees in the main cabin, a midship cabin on the port side with two single berths, a mid-aft starboard cabin with two single berths and an aft cabin with a double island berth and an L-shaped settee. The galley is located on the port side forward. The galley is C-shaped and is equipped with a four-burner stove, refrigerator, freezer and a double sink. A navigation station is amidships, on the starboard side. There are six heads, one for each cabin.

The design has a hull speed of 12.51 kn (23.17 km/h).

== Operational history ==
In a 2018 review of the Swan 95 S for Boat International, Sam Fortescue wrote, "it feels like this all-purpose yacht is yearning to get away. She has the classic Swan lines that promise speed and faithful handling, but this conceals a slightly beamier, more comfortable interior for cruising. Go-anywhere sailing boats have never looked as good."

== See also ==
- List of sailing boat types
