= Swan 128 =

Sailboat class

Development
- Designer: Germán Frers; Lucio Micheletti; Misa Poggi
- Location: Finland
- Year: 2025
- No. built: none
- Builder: Oy Nautor AB
- Role: Cruiser-Racer
- Name: Swan 128

Boat
- Displacement: 270,700 lb (122,787 kg)
- Draft: 15.42 ft (4.70 m)

Hull
- Type: monohull
- Construction: carbon fibre
- LOH: 127.89 ft (38.98 m)
- LWL: 117.91 ft (35.94 m)
- Beam: 28.38 ft (8.65 m)
- Engine: 550 hp (410 kW) diesel engine

Hull appendages
- Keel: Fin keel
- Ballast: 87,000 lb (39,463 kg)
- Rudder: Dual spade-type rudders

Rig
- Rig type: Bermuda rig
- I foretriangle height: 157.5 ft (48.0 m)
- J foretriangle base: 50.4 ft (15.4 m)
- P mainsail luff: 155.8 ft (47.5 m)
- E mainsail foot: 47.9 ft (14.6 m)

Sails
- Sailplan: Fractional rigged sloop
- Mainsail area: 4,477 sq ft (415.9 m^{2})
- Jib/genoa area: 4,321 sq ft (401.4 m^{2})
- Gennaker area: 12,700 sq ft (1,180 m^{2})
- Upwind sail area: 8,798 sq ft (817.4 m^{2})
- Downwind sail area: 17,177 sq ft (1,595.8 m^{2})

The Swan 128 is a Finnish maxi yacht that was designed by Germán Frers as a cruiser-racer, with first deliveries projected for 2025. The boat is Frers' Project 1400. The exterior design is by Lucio Micheletti and the interior design by Misa Poggi. Cape Horn Engineering performed the computational fluid dynamics assessment.

The design was unveiled at the 2022 Monaco Yacht Show.

== Production ==
The design is under development by Oy Nautor AB in Jakobstad, Finland. The first boat's construction was started in 2022, with the launch expected in 2025.

== Design ==
The Swan 128 is a recreational keelboat, built predominantly of pre-preg Sprint technology epoxy resin infused carbon fibre with a Corecell core. It has wood trim, including a teak-faced deck. It has a fractional sloop rig, with four sets of swept spreaders and carbon fibre spars. The hull has a plumb stem, a reverse transom with a drop-down tailgate swimming platform, a yacht tender garage, dual internally mounted spade-type rudders controlled by two wheels and a fixed fin keel. It displaces 270,700 lb (122,787 kg) empty and carries 87,000 lb (39,463 kg) of ballast.

The boat has a draft of 15.42 ft (4.70 m) with the standard fin keel. A telescope keel is also planned, with a maximum a draft of 20.34 ft (6.20 m).

The boat is fitted with a 550 hp (410 kW) diesel engine with selective catalytic reduction, driving a variable pitch propeller for docking and manoeuvring. There are also two 230/400 volt, 32 kW, 3-phase diesel generators. The fuel tank holds 1,452 U.S. gallons (5,500 L; 1,209 imp gal) and the fresh water tank has a capacity of 700 U.S. gallons (2,600 L; 580 imp gal).

Interiors are custom designed. The factory standard interior has sleeping accommodation for 14 people in seven cabins. The owner's cabin is in the bow and has a double island berth. A mid-forward guest cabin on the port side has a double berth. There are two more guest cabins amidships, each with two single berths. The main salon has two straight settees, plus individual seats. A navigation station is in the main salon, on the port side. The crew quarters are in the stern and consist of three cabins, each with two bunk beds, plus a crew mess and laundry room. The galley is located on the port side aft. The galley is U-shaped and is equipped with a five-burner stove, a refrigerator, freezer and a double sink. There are seven heads, each with a shower, one for each cabin.

For sailing downwind the design may be equipped with an asymmetrical spinnaker of 12,700 sq ft (1,180 m^{2}).

== Operational history ==
In a 2022 Boat International review, Holly Overton reported, "the Swan 128 will feature a double rudder blade offering optimal control even at high speeds and fingertip steering, giving her agility as well as elegance. A generous sail plan, conceived as a mainsail, jib, solent jib, A0 and A2 spinnaker with a total geometric sail area of 715.6 square metres, means the model can reach her full potential even in light winds. Heeling is contained to around 20 degrees offering comfort when under sail."

== Related content ==
Actor Tom Cruise had previously ordered a 108-foot yacht but also visited Jakobstad, Finland, in May 2025 to see the recently completed 128-foot Swan yacht, which was initially rumored to be his purchase.

== See also ==
- List of sailing boat types
