= Swan 108 =

Sailboat class

Development
- Designer: Germán Frers; Lucio Micheletti; Misa Poggi
- Location: Finland
- Year: 2023
- No. built: 1
- Builder: Oy Nautor AB
- Role: Cruiser-Racer
- Name: Swan 108

Boat
- Displacement: 184,900 lb (83,869 kg)
- Draft: 16.1 ft (4.9 m)

Hull
- Type: monohull
- Construction: carbon fibre
- LOA: 114.83 ft (35.00 m) with bowsprit
- LOH: 108.27 ft (33.00 m)
- LWL: 100.26 ft (30.56 m)
- Beam: 24.8 ft (7.6 m)
- Engine: 350 hp (261 kW) diesel engine

Hull appendages
- Keel: Fin keel
- Ballast: 63,000 lb (28,576 kg)
- Rudder: Skeg-mounted/Spade-type/Transom-mounted rudder

Rig
- Rig type: Bermuda rig
- I foretriangle height: 142.06 ft (43.30 m)
- J foretriangle base: 42.39 ft (12.92 m)
- P mainsail luff: 137.80 ft (42.00 m)
- E mainsail foot: 45.80 ft (13.96 m)

Sails
- Sailplan: Fractional rigged sloop
- Mainsail area: 3,702 sq ft (343.9 m^{2})
- Jib/genoa area: 3,275 sq ft (304.3 m^{2})
- Upwind sail area: 6,977 sq ft (648.2 m^{2})

The Swan 108 is a Finnish maxi yacht that was designed by Germán Frers as a blue water cruiser-racer and first built in 2023. The exterior design is by Lucio Micheletti and the interior design is by Misa Poggi.

The boat will be first publicly shown at the 27-30 September 2023, Monaco Yacht Show.

== Production ==
The design is built by Oy Nautor AB in Finland. It was publicly announced in 2021, followed by a customer order in May 2021 and with construction of the first boat started the same year. The first boat was launched on 9 June 2023 and a second boat was under construction at that time.

== Design ==
The Swan 108 is a recreational keelboat, built predominantly of carbon fibre with SPRINT epoxy, with wood trim, including a teak-faced deck. It has a fractional sloop rig with a boom-furling mainsail or non-furling square-topped mainsail, with three sets of swept spreaders and carbon fibre spars. The hull has a plumb stem with a bowsprit, a reverse transom with a drop-down tailgate swimming platform, dinghy garage, dual internally mounted spade-type rudders controlled by dual wheels and a fixed fin keel. It displaces 184,900 lb (83,869 kg) and carries 63,000 lb (28,576 kg) of ballast.

The boat has a draft of 16.1 ft (4.9 m) with the standard keel.

The boat is fitted with a diesel engine of 350 hp (261 kW) for docking and manoeuvring, plus two 230 V 26 kW 1 phase diesel generators. The fuel tank holds 1,057 U.S. gallons (4,000 L; 880 imp gal) and the fresh water tank has a capacity of 686 U.S. gallons (2,600 L; 571 imp gal).

The design is available with a number of interior configurations. The standard interior has sleeping accommodation for 14 people in seven cabins. It has a double island berth in the bow cabin, another double island berth in the starboard forward cabin, two midship aft cabins, each with two single berths, an abaft cabin with two bunk beds and two aft cabins, one with two bunk beds to starboard and the other with a double to port. The main salon has a U-shaped settee and a straight settee with a dining table. The C-shaped galley is located on the port side aft. There are seven heads, one for each cabin.

== See also ==
- List of sailing boat types
