= Swan 90 =

Sailboat class

Swan 90 FD
Development
- Designer: Germán Frers
- Location: Finland
- Year: 2007
- No. built: 12
- Builder: Oy Nautor AB
- Role: Racer-Cruiser
- Name: Swan 90 FD

Boat
- Displacement: 130,000 lb (58,967 kg)
- Draft: 14.44 ft (4.40 m) with keel down

Hull
- Type: monohull
- Construction: glassfibre
- LOA: 88.91 ft (27.10 m)
- LWL: 80.54 ft (24.55 m)
- Beam: 21.19 ft (6.46 m)
- Engine: Volkswagen 285 hp (213 kW) diesel engine

Hull appendages
- Keel: Lifting keel
- Ballast: 40,500 lb (18,370 kg)
- Rudder: Spade-type rudder

Rig
- Rig type: Bermuda rig
- I foretriangle height: 120.73 ft (36.80 m)
- J foretriangle base: 35.30 ft (10.76 m)
- P mainsail luff: 116 ft (35 m)
- E mainsail foot: 37.57 ft (11.45 m)

Sails
- Sailplan: Masthead sloop
- Mainsail area: 2,187.89 sq ft (203.262 m^{2})
- Jib/genoa area: 2,130.88 sq ft (197.965 m^{2})
- Total sail area: 4,318.77 sq ft (401.227 m^{2})

The Swan 90 is a Finnish maxi yacht sailboat that was designed by Germán Frers as a blue water racer-cruiser and first built in 2007. It was built in "FD" (flush deck) and "S" (raised salon) deck arrangements.

== Production ==
The design was built by Oy Nautor AB in Finland, starting in 2007, with 12 boats built, but it is now out of production.

== Design ==
The Swan 90 is a recreational keelboat, built predominantly of carbon fibre, with wood trim, including a teak deck overlay. It has a masthead sloop rig, with four sets of swept spreaders and carbon fibre spars. The hull has a slightly raked stem, a reverse transom, an internally mounted spade-type rudder controlled by dual wheels, a retractable bow thruster and a lifting keel with a weighted bulb. It displaces 130,000 lb (58,967 kg) and carries 40,500 lb (18,370 kg) of lead ballast.

The boat has a draft of 14.44 ft (4.40 m) with the keel extended and 9.84 ft (3.00 m) with it retracted, allowing operation in shallower water.

The boat is fitted with a German Volkswagen diesel engine of 285 hp (213 kW) for docking and manoeuvring. The fuel tank holds 430 U.S. gallons (1,600 L; 360 imp gal) and the fresh water tank has a capacity of 265 U.S. gallons (1,000 L; 221 imp gal).

The design has sleeping accommodation for 12 people in five cabins, with a double berth in the bow cabin, two forward cabins each with two bunks, a U-shaped settee and a straight settee in the main cabin, an aft amidship cabin to starboard with two berths and two aft cabins, each with two bunk beds. The galley is located on the port side just forward of the companionway ladder. The galley is of straight configuration on two sides and is equipped with a four-burner gas stove, a refrigerator, freezer and a double sink. There are five heads, one for each cabin. It has air conditioning and central heating.

For sailing downwind the design may be equipped with an asymmetrical spinnaker. The boat has a hull speed of 12.03 kn (22.28 km/h).

== Operational history ==
The Swan 90 FD DSK, won as the fastest fixed-keel monohull at the 2009 RORC Caribbean 600.

In a 2009 Swan 90 FD review for Sail Magazine, Dave Schmidt wrote, "the yacht had no trouble sailing at or near windspeed on a reach, and it was a joy to watch the speedo climb into double digits, even though a sizable RIB was being towed astern."

A 2009 Yachting Magazine review noted, "of the high-performance Nautor Swan 90-most competitors simply see her wake as she fades into the distance. A racing boat through and through, the Swan 90 is also remarkably comfortable for cruising."

A Boat International article named the Swan 90 as one of the "6 of the best Nautor's Swan sailing yachts", noting, "The Swan 90s are proven performers on the racecourse. Nefertiti, for instance, took first place in both the 2013 and 2014 Swan Caribbean Challenge Trophy at the RORC Caribbean 600 regatta. They are also able bluewater cruisers, extremely seaworthy in transatlantic crossings and comfortable for long-range cruising."

== See also ==
- List of sailing boat types
