= Swan 86 =

Sailboat class

Development
- Designer: Germán Frers
- Location: Finland
- Year: 1988
- No. built: 3
- Builder: Oy Nautor AB
- Role: Cruiser-Racer
- Name: Swan 86

Boat
- Displacement: 110,000 lb (49,895 kg)
- Draft: 12.00 ft (3.66 m)

Hull
- Type: monohull
- Construction: glassfibre
- LOA: 85.75 ft (26.14 m)
- LWL: 67.50 ft (20.57 m)
- Beam: 20.33 ft (6.20 m)
- Engine: Volvo Penta 282 hp (210 kW) diesel engine

Hull appendages
- Keel: Wing keel
- Ballast: 44,000 lb (19,958 kg)
- Rudder: Spade-type rudder

Rig
- Rig type: Bermuda rig

Sails
- Sailplan: Masthead sloop
- Total sail area: 3,058 sq ft (284.1 m^{2})

Racing
- PHRF: -39

The Swan 86 is a Finnish maxi yacht sailboat that was designed by Germán Frers as a blue water cruiser-racer and first built in 1988.

== Production ==
The design was built by Oy Nautor AB in Finland, from 1988 to 1990 with three boats built, but it is now out of production.

== Design ==
The Swan 86 is a recreational keelboat, built predominantly of glassfibre, with wood trim. It has a masthead sloop rig, a raked stem, a sharply reverse transom, an internally mounted spade-type rudder controlled by a wheel and a fixed wing keel. It displaces 110,000 lb (49,895 kg) and carries 44,000 lb (19,958 kg) of lead ballast.

The boat has a draft of 12.00 ft (3.66 m) with the standard wing keel. It is fitted with a Swedish Volvo Penta diesel engine of 282 hp (210 kW) for docking and manoeuvring.

The design has sleeping accommodation for six people, with a single berth in the bow cabin, a single in the forward cabin, a double in the port midship cabin, an L-shaped settee and a U-shaped settee in the main cabin and an aft cabin with a double berth on the port side. The galley is located on the port side just aft of the companionway ladder. A navigation station is opposite the galley, on the starboard side.

The design has a hull speed of 11.01 kn (20.39 km/h) and a PHRF handicap of -39.

== See also ==
- List of sailing boat types
