= Sun Odyssey 30i =

Sailboat class

Development
- Designer: Marc Lombard
- Location: France
- Year: 2008
- Builder: Jeanneau
- Role: Cruiser
- Name: Sun Odyssey 30i

Boat
- Displacement: 8,697 lb (3,945 kg)
- Draft: 5.74 ft (1.75 m)

Hull
- Type: monohull
- Construction: fiberglass
- LOA: 29.49 ft (8.99 m)
- LWL: 27.10 ft (8.26 m)
- Beam: 10.43 ft (3.18 m)
- Engine: Yanmar 3YM20 21 hp (16 kW) diesel engine

Hull appendages
- Keel: fin keel with weighted bulb
- Ballast: 2,086 lb (946 kg)
- Rudder: spade-type rudder

Rig
- Rig type: Bermuda rig
- I foretriangle height: 38.48 ft (11.73 m)
- J foretriangle base: 10.56 ft (3.22 m)
- P mainsail luff: 36.02 ft (10.98 m)
- E mainsail foot: 11.81 ft (3.60 m)

Sails
- Sailplan: fractional rigged sloop
- Mainsail area: 239 sq ft (22.2 m^{2})
- Jib/genoa area: 224 sq ft (20.8 m^{2})
- Spinnaker area: 807 sq ft (75.0 m^{2})
- Upwind sail area: 463 sq ft (43.0 m^{2})
- Downwind sail area: 1,046 sq ft (97.2 m^{2})

Racing
- PHRF: 66

The Sun Odyssey 30i is a French sailboat that was designed by Marc Lombard as a cruiser and was first built in 2008.

The "i" in the designation indicates that the deck is injection-molded.

== Production ==
The design was built by Jeanneau in France, starting in 2008, but it is now out of production.

== Design ==
The Sun Odyssey 30i is a recreational keelboat, built predominantly of polyester fiberglass, with wood trim. The hull is made from solid fiberglass, while the deck is of fiberglass sandwich construction. It has a fractional sloop masthead sloop rig, with a deck-stepped mast, two sets of swept spreaders and aluminum spars with stainless steel 1X19 wire rigging. The hull has a nearly plumb stem, a reverse transom with a swimming platform, an internally mounted spade-type rudder controlled by a tiller or optional wheel, a fixed fin keel or optional stub keel, and a steel centerboard. The centerboard model has twin rudders and is designed to be beached. The fin keel model displaces 8,697 lb (3,945 kg) and carries 2,086 lb (946 kg) of cast iron ballast, while the centerboard version displaces 8,907 lb (4,040 kg) and carries 2,291 lb (1,039 kg) of cast iron exterior ballast.

The keel-equipped version of the boat has a draft of 5 ft 8 in (1.73 m), while the centerboard-equipped version has a draft of 6 ft 7 in (2.01 m) with the centerboard extended and 2 ft 10 in (0.86 m) with it retracted, allowing operation in shallow water, beaching or ground transportation on a trailer.

A "performance" version is equipped with a mast that is about 1.64 ft (0.50 m) taller, which results in a sail area increased by 3%.

The boat is fitted with a Japanese Yanmar 3YM20 diesel engine of 21 hp (16 kW) for docking and maneuvering. The fuel tank holds 13 U.S. gallons (49 L; 11 imp gal) and the fresh water tank has a capacity of 42 U.S. gallons (160 L; 35 imp gal).

The design has sleeping accommodation for four people, with a double "V"-berth in the bow cabin, two straight settees in the main cabin, and an aft cabin with a transversal double berth on the starboard side. The galley is located on the starboard side just forward to the companionway ladder. The galley is L-shaped and is equipped with a two-burner stove, an ice box and a sink. The head is located aft to port at the companionway and includes a shower. The cabin's maximum headroom is 73 in (185 cm).

For sailing downwind the design may be equipped with a symmetrical spinnaker of 807 sq ft (75.0 m^{2}).

The design has a hull speed of 6.98 kn (12.93 km/h) and a PHRF handicap of 66.

== See also ==
- List of sailing boat types
