= Swan 68 =

Sailboat class

Development
- Designer: Germán Frers
- Location: Finland
- Year: 1991
- No. built: 24
- Builder: Oy Nautor AB
- Role: Cruiser-Racer
- Name: Swan 68

Boat
- Displacement: 88,184 lb (40,000 kg)
- Draft: 10.83 ft (3.30 m)

Hull
- Type: monohull
- Construction: glassfibre
- LOA: 67.68 ft (20.63 m)
- LWL: 54.72 ft (16.68 m)
- Beam: 17.78 ft (5.42 m)
- Engine: Perkins Engines Sabre 225 hp (168 kW) diesel engine

Hull appendages
- Keel: Fin keel
- Ballast: 35,274 lb (16,000 kg)
- Rudder: Spade-type rudder

Rig
- Rig type: Bermuda rig
- I foretriangle height: 90.00 ft (27.43 m)
- J foretriangle base: 25.90 ft (7.89 m)
- P mainsail luff: 81.50 ft (24.84 m)
- E mainsail foot: 24.50 ft (7.47 m)

Sails
- Sailplan: Masthead sloop
- Mainsail area: 994.4 sq ft (92.38 m^{2})
- Spinnaker area: 4,179 sq ft (388.2 m^{2})
- Other sails: genoa: 1,741 sq ft (161.7 m^{2})
- Upwind sail area: 2,735.4 sq ft (254.13 m^{2})
- Downwind sail area: 5,173.4 sq ft (480.62 m^{2})

Racing
- PHRF: 0 to -33

The Swan 68 is a Finnish sailboat that was designed by Germán Frers as a blue water cruiser-racer and first built in 1991. The boat was built with two different transom designs, angled and reverse.

== Production ==
The design was built by Oy Nautor AB in Finland, from 1992 until 2004, with 24 boats completed, but it is now out of production. The company considers the production run to have been "a great success for a yacht of this size".

== Design ==
The Swan 68 is a recreational keelboat, built predominantly of glassfibre, with wood trim. It has a masthead sloop rig, a raked stem, a reverse transom or optional traditional angled transom, an internally mounted spade-type rudder controlled by a wheel and a fixed fin keel. It displaces 88,184 lb (40,000 kg) and carries 35,274 lb (16,000 kg) of lead ballast.

The boat has a draft of 10.83 ft (3.30 m) with the standard keel.

The boat is fitted with a British Perkins Engines Sabre diesel engine of 225 hp (168 kW) for docking and manoeuvring. The fuel tank holds 375 U.S. gallons (1,420 L; 312 imp gal) and the fresh water tank has a capacity of 435 U.S. gallons (1,650 L; 362 imp gal).

Interior layouts vary, but typical is one with sleeping accommodation for seven people, with two forward cabins, each with two bunk beds, two L-shaped settees in the main cabin, a midship single cabin and a large aft cabin with a double berth on the port side. The galley is located on the port side just aft of the companionway ladder. The galley is C-shaped and is equipped with a four-burner stove, an ice box and a double sink. A navigation station is opposite the galley, on the starboard side. There are four heads with showers, one for each cabin.

For sailing downwind the design may be equipped with a symmetrical spinnaker of 4,179 sq ft (388.2 m^{2}).

The design has a hull speed of 9.91 kn (18.35 km/h) and a PHRF handicap of 0 to -33.

== See also ==
- List of sailing boat types
