= Swan 77 =

Sailboat class

Development
- Designer: Germán Frers
- Location: Finland
- Year: 1992
- No. built: 10
- Builder: Oy Nautor AB
- Role: Cruiser-Racer

Boat
- Displacement: 112,435 lb (51,000 kg)
- Draft: 11.15 ft (3.40 m)

Hull
- Type: monohull
- Construction: glassfibre
- LOA: 78.77 ft (24.01 m)
- LWL: 60.30 ft (18.38 m)
- Beam: 19.68 ft (6.00 m)
- Engine: Perkins Engines 220 hp (164 kW) diesel engine

Hull appendages
- Keel: Fin keel
- Ballast: 39,683 lb (18,000 kg)
- Rudder: Spade-type rudder

Rig
- Rig type: Bermuda rig
- I foretriangle height: 98.42 ft (30.00 m)
- J foretriangle base: 29.86 ft (9.10 m)
- P mainsail luff: 89.89 ft (27.40 m)
- E mainsail foot: 29.86 ft (9.10 m)

Sails
- Sailplan: Masthead sloop
- Mainsail area: 1,342.06 sq ft (124.681 m^{2})
- Jib/genoa area: 1,469.41 sq ft (136.513 m^{2})
- Total sail area: 2,811.47 sq ft (261.194 m^{2})

Racing
- PHRF: 0

The Swan 77 is a Finnish sailboat that was designed by Germán Frers as a blue water cruiser-racer and first built in 1992.

== Production ==
The design was built by Oy Nautor AB in Finland, from 1992 until 2003, with 10 boats completed, but it is now out of production.

== Design ==
The Swan 77 is a recreational keelboat, built predominantly of glassfibre, with wood trim. It has a masthead sloop rig; a raked stem, a raised counter, reverse transom; an internally mounted spade-type rudder controlled by a wheel and a fixed fin keel. It displaces 112,435 lb (51,000 kg) and carries 39,683 lb (18,000 kg) of lead ballast.

The boat has a draft of 11.15 ft (3.40 m) with the standard keel.

The boat is fitted with a British Perkins Engines diesel engine of 220 hp (164 kW) for docking and manoeuvring. The fuel tank holds 459 U.S. gallons (1,740 L; 382 imp gal) and the fresh water tank has a capacity of 462 U.S. gallons (1,750 L; 385 imp gal).

Interiors fitted vary, but typical is one with sleeping accommodation for eight people, with a single berth in the forepeak two bunk beds in the forward cabin, two U-shaped settees in the main cabin, two mid cabins one with two bunk beds and the other a single berth, and an aft cabin with a double berth on the port side, plus a large settee. The galley is located on the starboard side just forward of the main cabin. The galley is an open "L"-shape and is equipped with a four-burner stove, an ice box and a double sink. A navigation station is on the starboard side of the companionway steps. There are five heads, one for each cabin.

The design has a hull speed of 10.41 kn (19.28 km/h) and a PHRF handicap of zero.

== Operational history ==
Swedish business man, former chairman of BP and chairman of Volvo, Carl-Henric Svanberg owned and sailed a Swan 77.

== See also ==
- List of sailing boat types
