= Swan 88 =

Sailboat class

Development
- Designer: Germán Frers; Micheletti+Partners; Misa Poggi
- Location: Finland
- Year: 2023
- No. built: None
- Builder: Oy Nautor AB
- Role: Cruiser-Racer
- Name: Swan 88

Boat
- Displacement: 117,270 lb (53,193 kg)
- Draft: 13.12 ft (4.00 m)

Hull
- Type: monohull
- Construction: glassfibre
- LOA: 92.75 ft (28.27 m)
- LOH: 87.10 ft (26.55 m)
- LWL: 81.59 ft (24.87 m)
- Beam: 22.28 ft (6.79 m)
- Engine: hybrid electric-propulsion system

Hull appendages
- Keel: Fin keel
- Ballast: 33,180 lb (15,050 kg)
- Rudder: Skeg-mounted/Spade-type/Transom-mounted rudder

Rig
- Rig type: Bermuda rig
- I foretriangle height: 116.83 ft (35.61 m)
- J foretriangle base: 34.12 ft (10.40 m)
- P mainsail luff: 115.16 ft (35.10 m)
- E mainsail foot: 36.09 ft (11.00 m)

Sails
- Sailplan: Fractional rigged sloop Masthead sloop
- Mainsail area: 2,542 sq ft (236.2 m^{2})
- Jib/genoa area: 2,115 sq ft (196.5 m^{2})
- Gennaker area: 7,427 sq ft (690.0 m^{2})
- Upwind sail area: 4,657 sq ft (432.6 m^{2})
- Downwind sail area: 9,969 sq ft (926.2 m^{2})

The Swan 88 is a Finnish maxi yacht that was designed by Germán Frers and is under development as a cruiser-racer. The deck engineering was done by Micheletti+Partners and the interior design by Misa Poggi.

== Production ==
The design was announced in December 2020 and will be built by Oy Nautor AB in Finland. The first boat sold was ordered by a customer in early 2021, for delivery in 2023.

== Design ==
The Swan 88 is a recreational keelboat, built predominantly of glassfibre, with wood trim. It has a fractional sloop rig with a fixed bowsprit, with three sets of swept spreaders. The hull has a plumb stem, a reverse transom with a drop-down tailgate swimming platform, a dinghy garage, dual internally mounted spade-type rudders controlled by dual wheels and a fixed fin keel, optional shoal-draft keel or lifting keel. It displaces 119,270 lb (54,100 kg) and carries 33,180 lb (15,050 kg) of ballast. It is designed to sail at an optimal heeling angle of 20 degrees.

The boat has a draft of 13.12 ft (4.00 m) with the standard keel and 11.81 ft (3.60 m) with the optional shoal draft keel. The lifting keel version has a draft of 15.09 ft (4.60 m) with the keel extended and 9.84 ft (3.00 m) with it retracted, allowing operation in shallow water.

The boat will be fitted with a hybrid electric-propulsion system for docking and manoeuvring. The fuel tank holds 740 U.S. gallons (2,800 L; 620 imp gal) and the fresh water tank has a capacity of 396 U.S. gallons (1,500 L; 330 imp gal).

The design has sleeping accommodation for 12 people in six cabins, with a double island berth in the bow cabin, a starboard forward cabin with a double berth, two L-shaped settees in the main salon, two aft midship cabins, each with two singles and two aft cabins, each with a double berth. The galley is located aft on the port side. The galley is U-shaped and is equipped with a four-burner stove, a refrigerator, freezer and a double sink. A navigation station is in the salon, on the port side. There are five heads fitted.

The deck is divided into four areas, with a "sunset lounge" seating area forward, the cockpit, an aft guest cockpit and the swimming platform when the tailgate is lowered.

For reaching and sailing downwind the design may be equipped with a gennaker of 7,427 sq ft (690.0 m^{2}).

== See also ==
- List of sailing boat types
