= Swan 45 =

Sailboat class

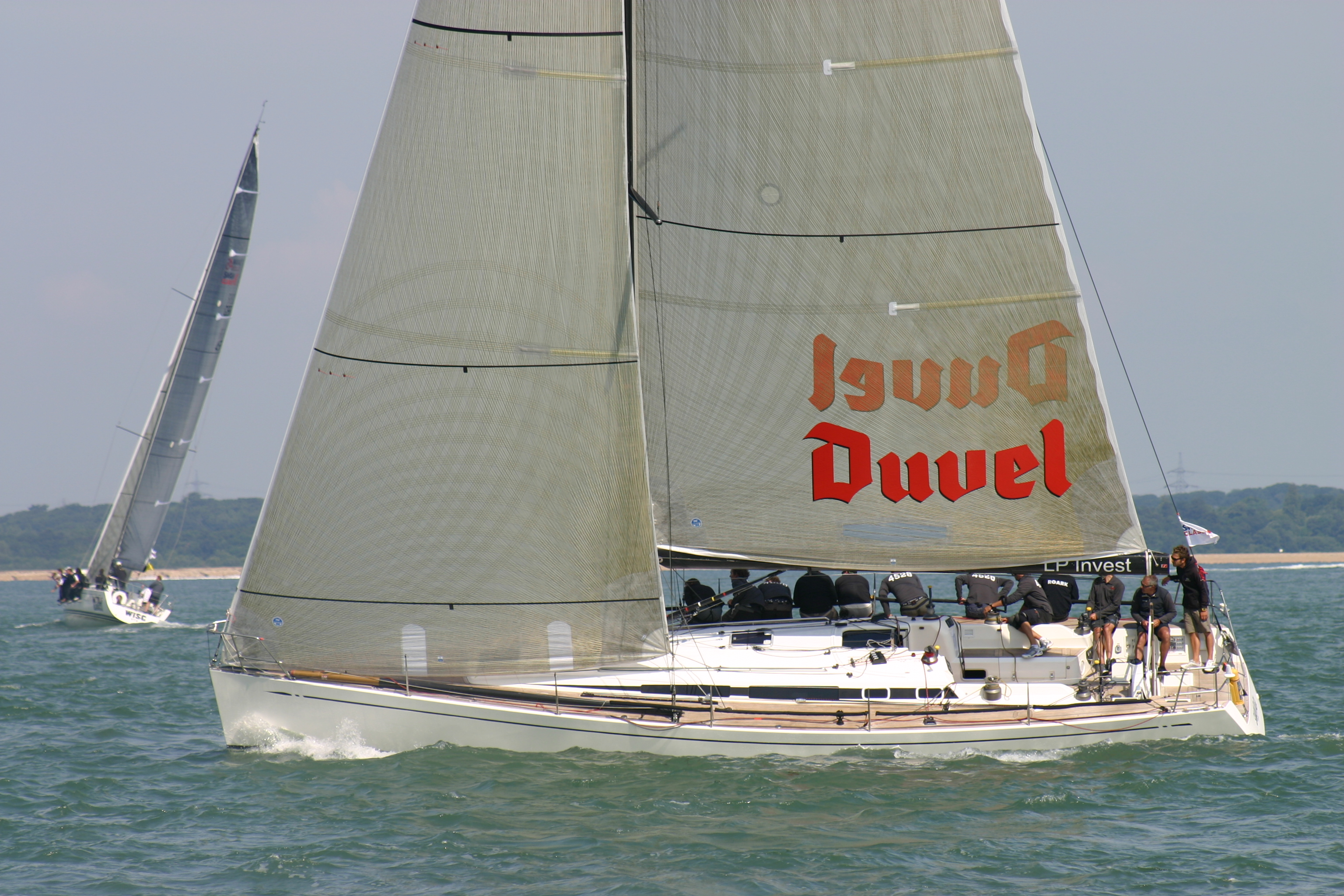

Development
- Designer: Germán Frers
- Location: Finland
- Year: 2001
- No. built: 50
- Builder: Oy Nautor AB
- Role: Racer-Cruiser
- Name: Swan 45

Boat
- Displacement: 21,716 lb (9,850 kg)
- Draft: 9.19 ft (2.80 m)

Hull
- Type: monohull
- Construction: glassfibre
- LOA: 45.37 ft (13.83 m)
- LWL: 39.60 ft (12.07 m)
- Beam: 12.83 ft (3.91 m)
- Engine: Perkins Engines 58 hp (43 kW) diesel engine

Hull appendages
- Keel: Fin keel
- Ballast: 8,620 lb (3,910 kg)
- Rudder: Spade-type rudder

Rig
- Rig type: Bermuda rig
- I foretriangle height: 61.68 ft (18.80 m)
- J foretriangle base: 17.72 ft (5.40 m)
- P mainsail luff: 61.22 ft (18.66 m)
- E mainsail foot: 21.82 ft (6.65 m)

Sails
- Sailplan: 9/10 Fractional rigged sloop
- Mainsail area: 822 sq ft (76.4 m^{2})
- Jib/genoa area: 589 sq ft (54.7 m^{2})
- Spinnaker area: 1,647 sq ft (153.0 m^{2})
- Upwind sail area: 1,411 sq ft (131.1 m^{2})
- Downwind sail area: 2,469 sq ft (229.4 m^{2})

Racing
- PHRF: -8 to -18

The Swan 45 is a Finnish sailboat that was designed by Germán Frers as a one design racer-cruiser and first built in 2001.

The boat was accepted as a World Sailing international class in 2005.

== Production ==
The design was built by Oy Nautor AB in Jakobstad, Finland, from 2001 until 2010, with 50 boats completed, but it is now out of production.

== Design ==
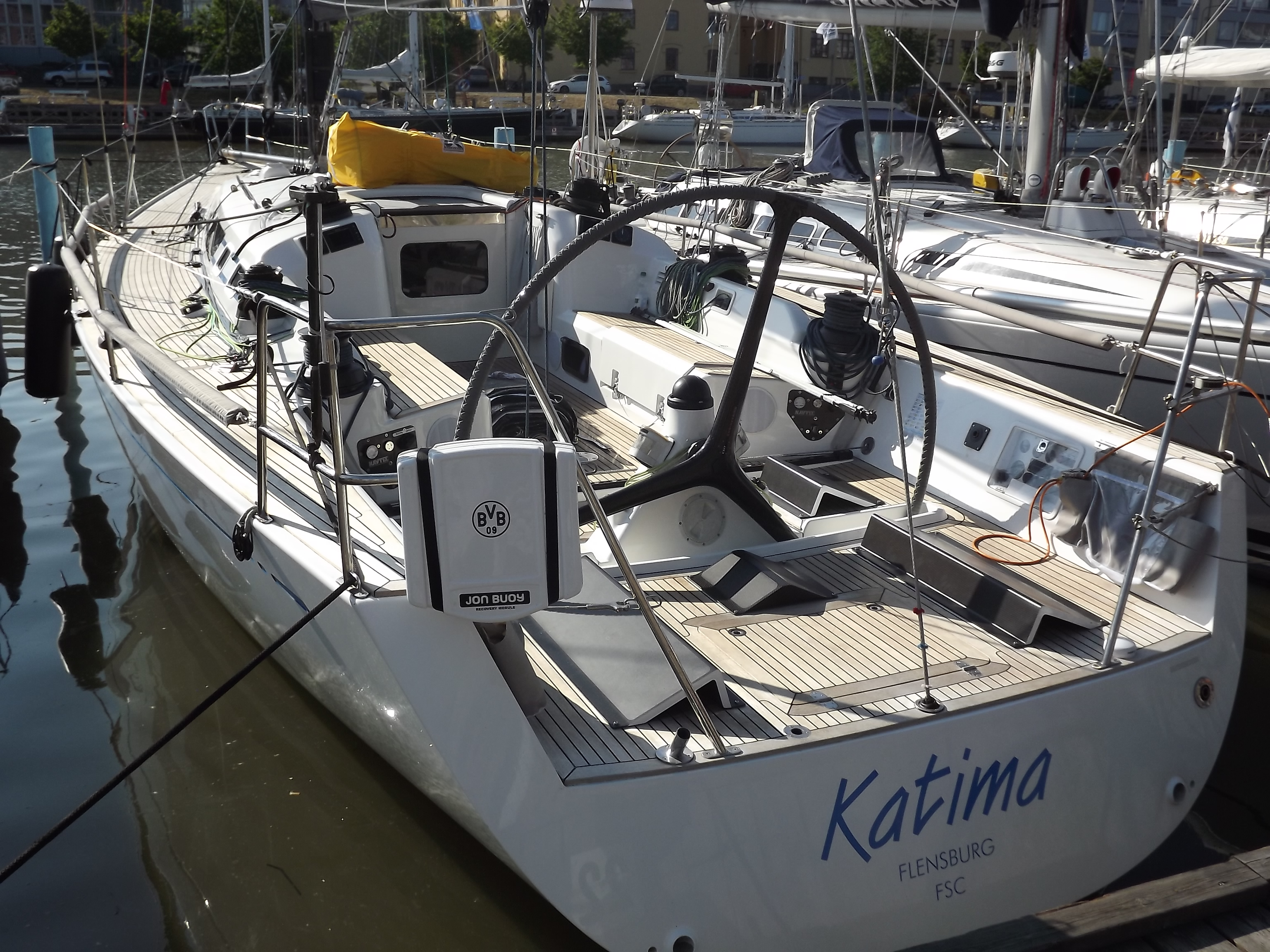
A Swan 45 transom view, showing the unusually large wheel.

The Swan 45 is a racing keelboat, built predominantly of glassfibre, with wood trim. It has a fractional sloop rig, with a keel-stepped mast, two sets of swept spreaders and carbon fibre spars. The hull has a slightly raked stem, an open reverse transom, an internally mounted spade-type rudder controlled by a wheel and a fixed fin keel with a weighted bulb. It displaces 21,716 lb (9,850 kg) and carries 8,620 lb (3,910 kg) of lead ballast.

The boat has a draft of 9.19 ft (2.80 m) with the standard keel.

The boat is fitted with a British Perkins Engines diesel engine of 58 hp (43 kW) for docking and manoeuvring. The fuel tank holds 55.5 U.S. gallons (210 L; 46.2 imp gal) and the fresh water tank has a capacity of 84.5 U.S. gallons (320 L; 70.4 imp gal).

The design has sleeping accommodation for four people, with a double "V"-berth in the bow cabin, two straight settees in the main cabin and an aft cabin with a split double berth on the port side. The galley is located on the port side just forward of the companionway ladder. The galley is L-shaped and is equipped with a four-burner stove, an ice box and a double sink. A navigation station is opposite the galley, on the starboard side. There are two heads, one in the bow cabin on the port side and one on the starboard side aft.

For sailing downwind the design may be equipped with a symmetrical spinnaker of 1,647 sq ft (153.0 m^{2}).

The design has a hull speed of 8.43 kn (15.61 km/h) and a PHRF handicap of -8 to -18.

During the 2002 Swan Cup competition in Sardinia two Swan 45s both broke their rudders. The parts were returned to Nautor, analyzed and a new, stronger design produced.

== Operational history ==
The boat is supported by an active class club that organizes racing events, the Swan 45 Class. It has been a World Sailing international class since 2005.

The design was named Boat of the Show at the 2002 London Boat Show and Sailing World Magazine 2003 Boat of the Year.

A Cruising World 2002 article summarized the design, "the Swan 45 is a clean-cut thoroughbred racer with a luxurious cruise-capable interior."

In a 2003 review, Yachting World noted, "while the 45 is primarily a performance racing boat with an option for cruising, Swan have been careful to retain the special, 'Swan cruising feel' including the classic teak decking, and attention to detail which makes this company’s boats stand out from the rest."

In a 2007 review for Yachting, Dennis Caprio wrote, "although the new Swan 45 shares styling themes with her ancestors, she is not the same type of boat. She is the progeny of the high-tech and rapid Swan 70 and 80, luxurious light-displacement cruising/racing yachts, also designed by German Frers. Like these semi-custom yachts, the 45 has an appetite for nautical miles, whether the owners are racing or cruising."

== See also ==
- List of sailing boat types
