= Swan 51 =

Sailboat class

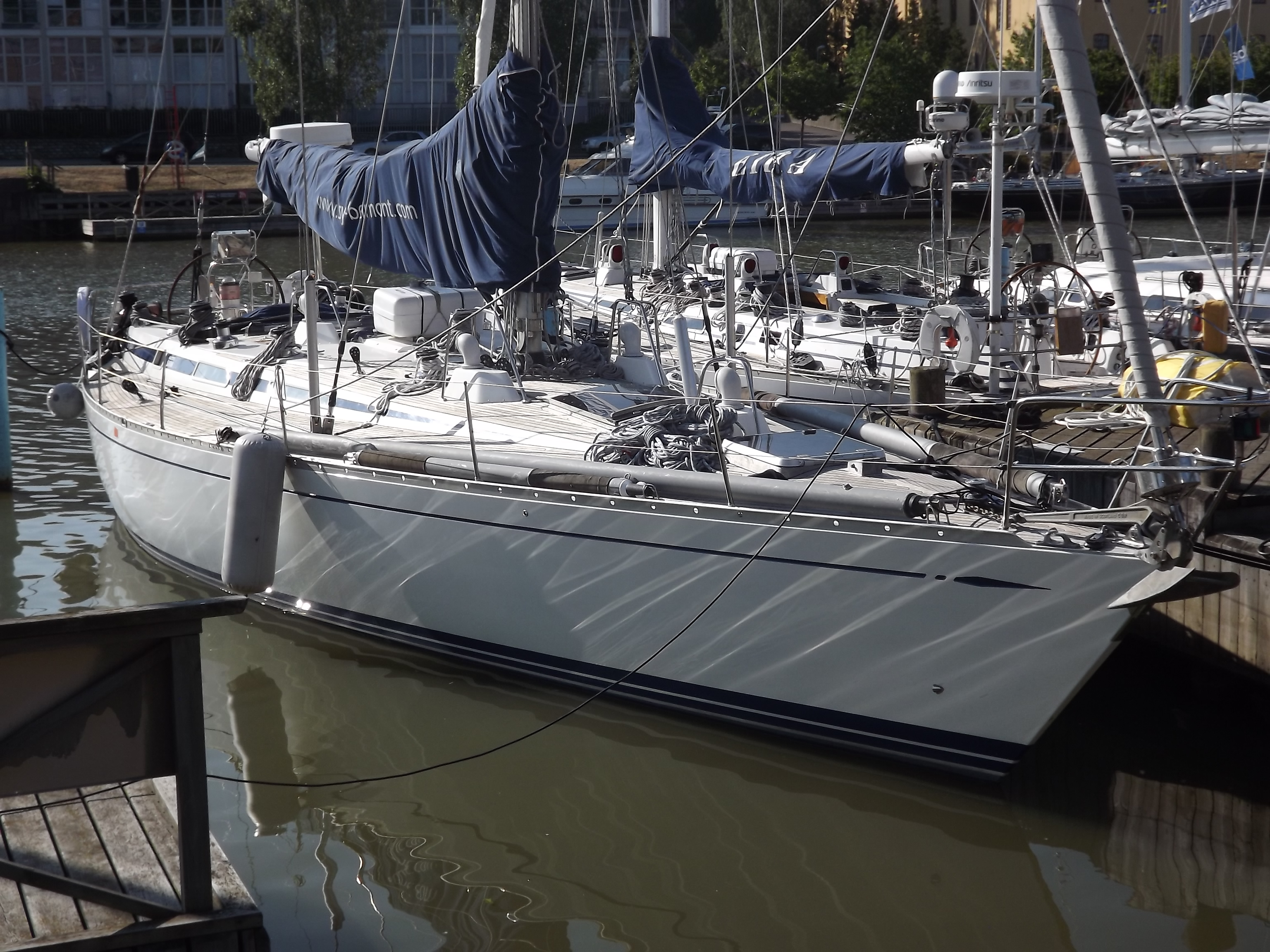

Development
- Designer: Germán Frers
- Location: Finland
- Year: 1980
- No. built: 36
- Builder: Oy Nautor AB
- Role: Racer-Cruiser
- Name: Swan 51

Boat
- Displacement: 39,600 lb (17,962 kg)
- Draft: 8.90 ft (2.71 m)

Hull
- Type: monohull
- Construction: glassfibre
- LOA: 51.25 ft (15.62 m)
- LWL: 42.33 ft (12.90 m)
- Beam: 14.67 ft (4.47 m)
- Engine: Perkins Engines 73 hp (54 kW) diesel engine

Hull appendages
- Keel: Fin keel
- Ballast: 16,500 lb (7,484 kg)
- Rudder: Spade-type rudder

Rig
- Rig type: Bermuda rig
- I foretriangle height: 69.50 ft (21.18 m)
- J foretriangle base: 20.90 ft (6.37 m)
- P mainsail luff: 62.70 ft (19.11 m)
- E mainsail foot: 18.00 ft (5.49 m)

Sails
- Sailplan: Masthead sloop
- Mainsail area: 564.30 sq ft (52.425 m^{2})
- Jib/genoa area: 726.28 sq ft (67.474 m^{2})
- Total sail area: 1,290.58 sq ft (119.899 m^{2})

Racing
- PHRF: 27-54

The Swan 51 is a Finnish sailboat that was designed by Germán Frers as a racer-cruiser and first built in 1980. It was the first Swan design by Frers and led to a long collaboration between Frers and the manufacturer.

== Production ==
The design was built by Oy Nautor AB in Finland, from 1980 to 1985, with 36 boats completed, but it is now out of production.

== Design ==
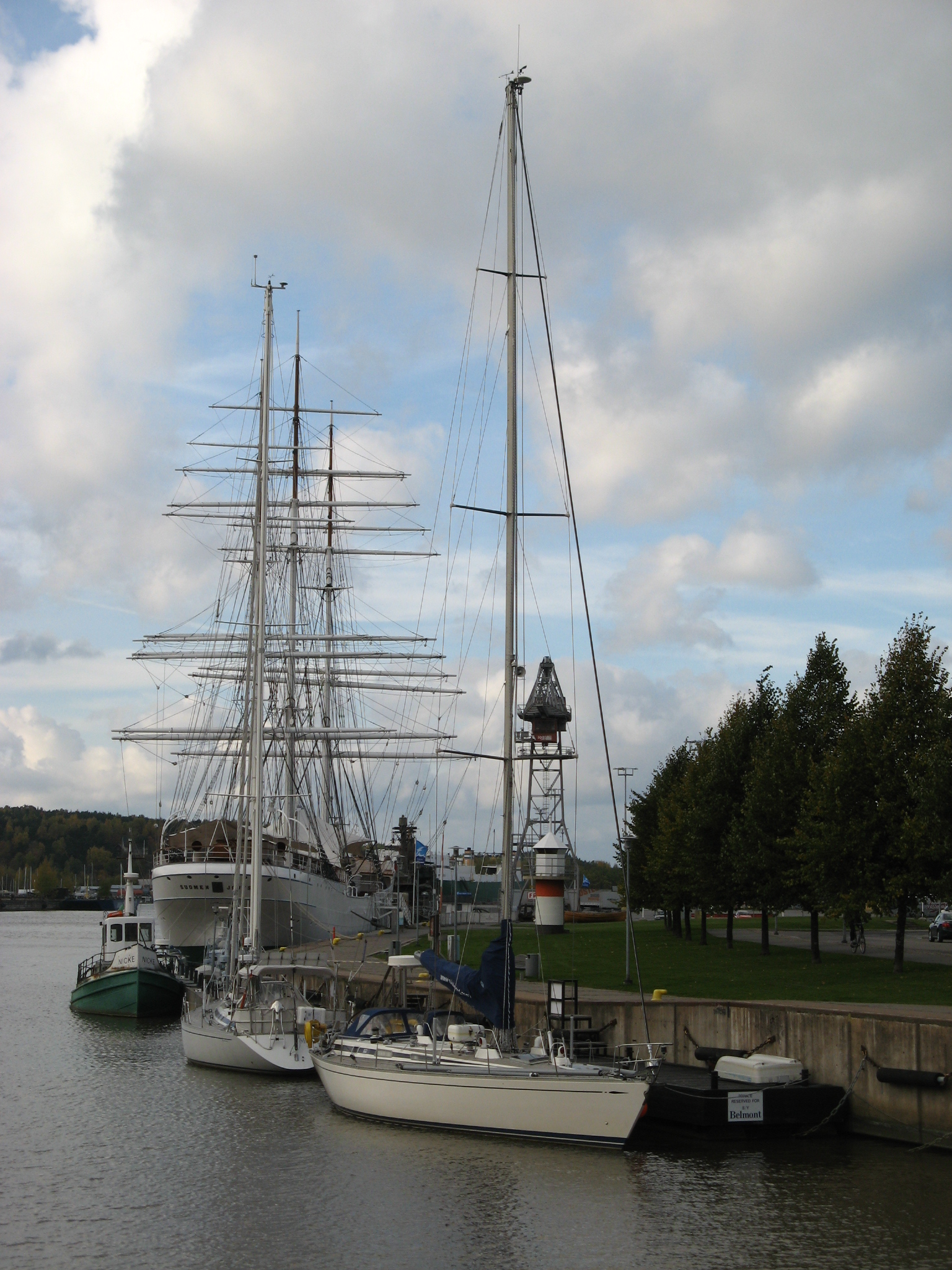
Swan 51 showing mast height and spreaders

The Swan 51 is a racing keelboat, built predominantly of glassfibre, with wood trim. It has a masthead sloop rig, three sets of unswept spreaders and aluminium spars. The hull has a raked stem, a reverse transom, an internally mounted spade-type rudder controlled by a wheel and a fixed fin keel or optional keel and centreboard. It displaces 39,600 lb (17,962 kg) and carries 16,500 lb (7,484 kg) of lead ballast.

The boat has a draft of 8.90 ft (2.71 m) with the standard fin keel.

The boat is fitted with a British Perkins Engines diesel engine of 73 hp (54 kW) for docking and manoeuvring. The fuel tank holds 69 U.S. gallons (260 L; 57 imp gal) and the fresh water tank has a capacity of 184 U.S. gallons (700 L; 153 imp gal).

The design has sleeping accommodation for six people, with a double bunk beds in the forward cabin, a U-shaped settee and a straight settee in the main cabin with a pilot berth above to port and an aft cabin with a double berth and a single berth. The galley is located on the port side just aft of the companionway ladder. The galley is U-shaped and is equipped with a three-burner stove, an ice box and a double sink. A navigation station is opposite the galley, on the starboard side. There are two heads, one in the bow cabin on the starboard side and one on the port side in the aft cabin.

The design has a hull speed of 8.72 kn (16.15 km/h) and a PHRF handicap of 27 to 54 for the fin keel model and 42 to 54 for the centreboard version.

== Operational history ==
In 2013 boats.com named the design as one of the "6 of the best Nautor's Swan yachts of all-time".

== See also ==
- List of sailing boat types
