= Swan 56 =

Sailboat class

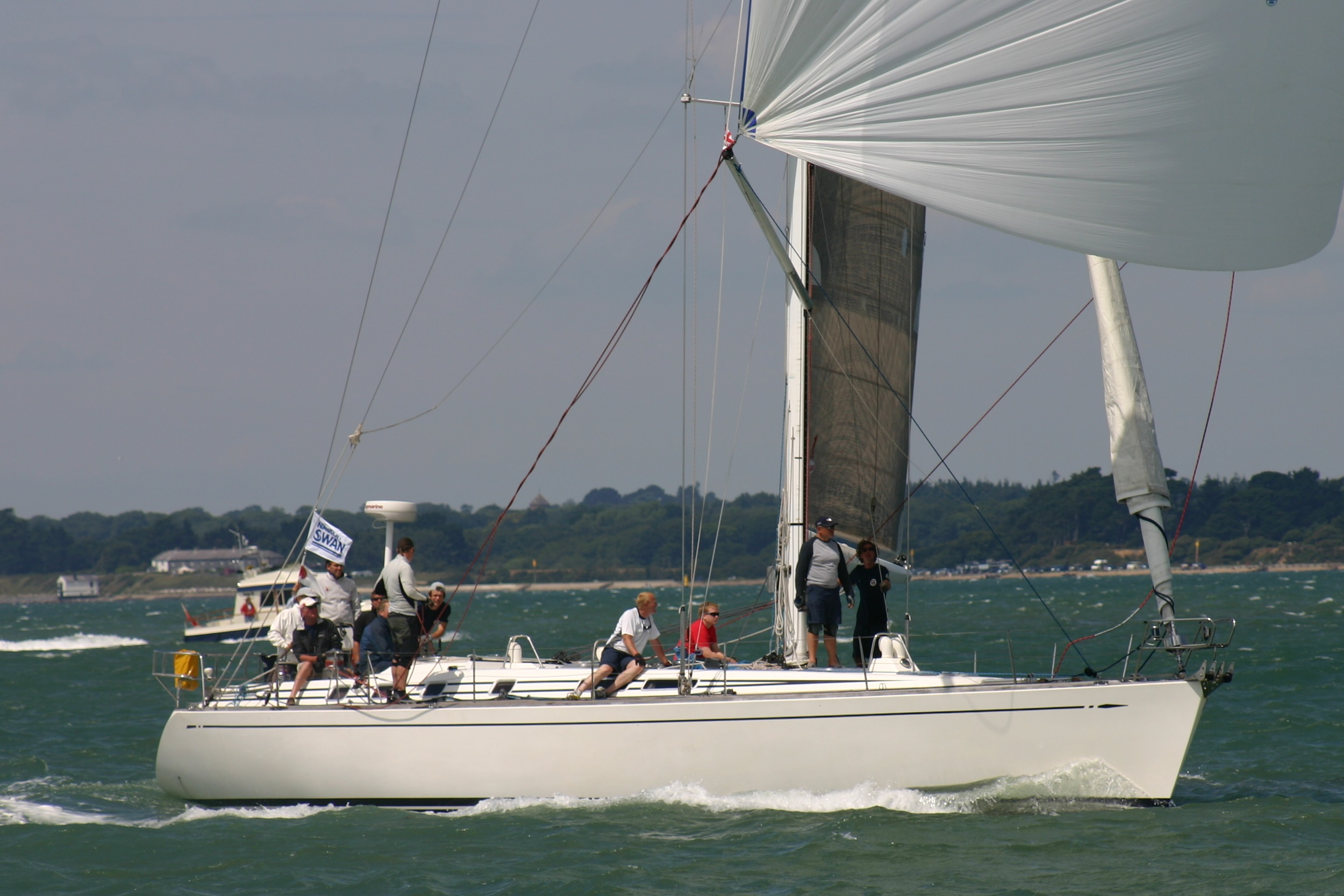

Development
- Designer: Germán Frers
- Location: Finland
- Year: 1996
- No. built: 46
- Builder: Oy Nautor AB
- Role: Cruiser-Racer
- Name: Swan 56

Boat
- Displacement: 43,000 lb (19,504 kg)
- Draft: 8.86 ft (2.70 m)

Hull
- Type: monohull
- Construction: glassfibre
- LOA: 57.51 ft (17.53 m)
- LWL: 49.48 ft (15.08 m)
- Beam: 15.52 ft (4.73 m)
- Engine: Yanmar 4JH2-UTBE 96 hp (72 kW) diesel engine

Hull appendages
- Keel: Fin keel with weighted bulb
- Ballast: 13,700 lb (6,214 kg)
- Rudder: Spade-type rudder

Rig
- Rig type: Bermuda rig
- I foretriangle height: 74.15 ft (22.60 m)
- J foretriangle base: 20.57 ft (6.27 m)
- P mainsail luff: 66.60 ft (20.30 m)
- E mainsail foot: 21.88 ft (6.67 m)

Sails
- Sailplan: Masthead sloop
- Mainsail area: 728.60 sq ft (67.689 m^{2})
- Jib/genoa area: 762.63 sq ft (70.851 m^{2})
- Total sail area: 1,491.23 sq ft (138.540 m^{2})

Racing
- PHRF: -21 to 33

The Swan 56 is a Finnish sailboat that was designed by Germán Frers as a blue water cruiser-racer and first built in 1996. A racing oriented version was designated as the Swan 56R for Regatta.

== Production ==
The design was built by Oy Nautor AB in Finland, from 1996 to 2006 with 46 boats completed, but it is now out of production. The Swan 56R was built from 1998, total production no.: 4.

== Design ==
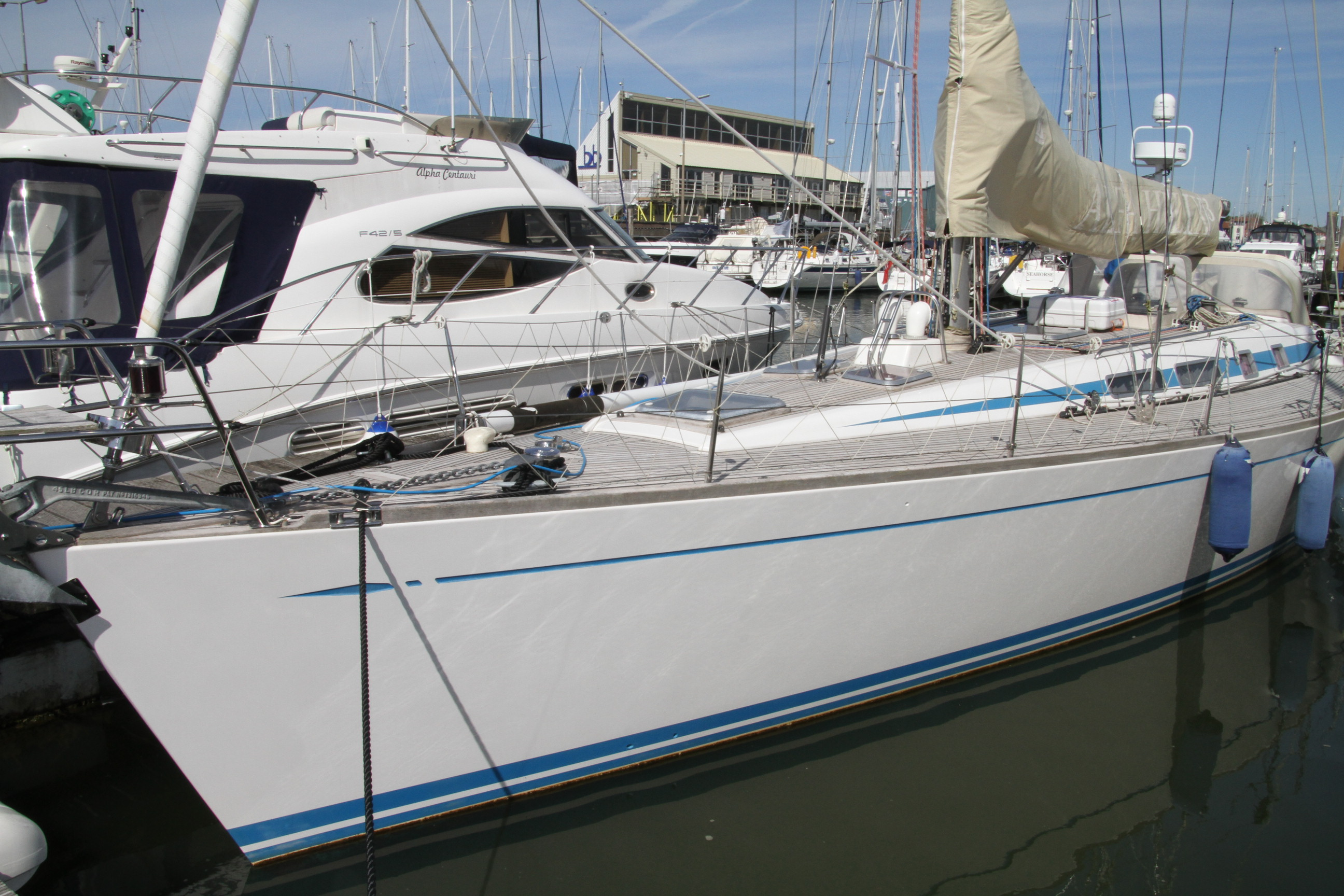
Swan 56

The Swan 56 is a recreational keelboat, built predominantly of polyester glassfibre and Kevlar, with wood trim. The hull is solid while the deck is foam-cored. It has a masthead sloop rig, with a raked stem plumb stem, a reverse transom with a folding swimming platform, an internally mounted spade-type rudder controlled by a wheel and a fixed fin keel or optional shoal-draft keel.

The boat is fitted with a Japanese Yanmar 4JH2-UTBE diesel engine of 96 hp (72 kW) for docking and manoeuvring. The fuel tank holds 105 U.S. gallons (400 L; 87 imp gal) and the fresh water tank has a capacity of 225 U.S. gallons (850 L; 187 imp gal).

The design has sleeping accommodation for six people, with two forward cabins, each with bunk beds, an L-shaped settee and a straight settee in the main cabin and an aft cabin with a central island double berth. The galley is located on the port side just aft of the companionway ladder. The galley is L-shaped and is equipped with a four-burner stove, an ice box and a sink. A navigation station is opposite the galley, on the starboard side. There are two heads, one just forward of the bow cabin in the forepeak and one on the starboard side in the aft cabin.

For sailing downwind the design may be equipped with a symmetrical spinnaker.

The design has a hull speed of 9.43 kn (17.46 km/h).

== Variants ==
Swan 56
This model was introduced in 1996. It has a length overall of 57.51 ft (17.5 m), a waterline length of 49.48 ft (15.1 m), displaces 43,000 lb (19,504 kg) and carries 13,700 lb (6,214 kg) of ballast. The boat has a draft of 8.86 ft (2.70 m) with the standard keel. An optional shoal draft keel was also available. The boat has a PHRF handicap of -21 to 33 for the fin keel model and -9 for the shoal draft model.
Swan 56R
This "Regatta" model was introduced in 1998 and has a deep draft keel, lighter weight and a fractional rig, although a few were delivered with a masthead rig. It has a length overall of 57.51 ft (17.5 m), a waterline length of 49.48 ft (15.1 m), displaces 39,700 lb (18,008 kg) and carries 14,600 lb (6,622 kg) of lead ballast. The boat has a draft of 11.02 ft (3.36 m) with the standard keel. The boat has a PHRF racing average handicap of -12 to -36.

== Operational history ==
In a 2000 boats.com design review, Robert Perry wrote, "typical of Frers' collaborations with Nautor, there is not an ugly line anywhere on this design. This hull is totally smooth, without any skegs or creases. The beam has been carried aft, and the corners of the transom are tapered off as is common with Frers designs. This provides a very shapely transom"

In a review for Sailing Magazine, John Kretschmer wrote, "the Swan 56 lives up to its promise. It was intelligently conceived and beautifully finished. I have a suspicion that in a few years' time, we will be calling the 56 the latest Nautor Swan classic."

== See also ==
- List of sailing boat types
