= Swan 651 =

Sailboat class

Development
- Designer: Germán Frers
- Location: Finland
- Year: 1982
- No. built: 19
- Builder: Oy Nautor AB
- Role: Cruiser-Racer
- Name: Swan 651

Boat
- Displacement: 75,500 lb (34,246 kg)
- Draft: 11.50 ft (3.51 m)

Hull
- Type: monohull
- Construction: glassfibre
- LOA: 65.68 ft (20.02 m)
- LWL: 55.08 ft (16.79 m)
- Beam: 17.50 ft (5.33 m)
- Engine: Perkins Engines 120 hp (89 kW) diesel engine

Hull appendages
- Keel: Fin keel
- Ballast: 31,700 lb (14,379 kg)
- Rudder: Skeg-mounted rudder

Rig
- Rig type: Bermuda rig

Sails
- Sailplan: Masthead sloop

Racing
- PHRF: 6 to -12

The Swan 651 is a Finnish sailboat that was designed by Germán Frers as a blue water cruiser-racer and first built in 1982.

== Production ==
The design was built by Oy Nautor AB in Finland, from 1982 until 1991 with 19 boats completed, but it is now out of production.

== Design ==
The Swan 651 is a recreational keelboat, built predominantly of glassfibre, with wood trim. It has a masthead sloop rig, a raked stem, a reverse transom, a skeg-mounted rudder controlled by a wheel and a fixed fin keel or optional stub keel and retractable centreboard. It displaces 75,500 lb (34,246 kg) and carries 31,700 lb (14,379 kg) of lead ballast.

The boat has a draft of 11.50 ft (3.51 m) with the standard keel and is fitted with a British Perkins Engines diesel engine of 120 hp (89 kW) for docking and manoeuvring.

The design has sleeping accommodation for six people, with two bunk beds in each of two forward cabins, a U-shaped settee and a straight settee in the main cabin and an aft cabin with a central, double island berth. The galley is located on the port side just aft of the companionway ladder. The galley is U-shaped and is equipped with a four-burner stove, an ice box and a double sink. A navigation station is opposite the galley, on the starboard side. There are three heads, one for each cabin.

The design has a hull speed of 9.94 kn (18.41 km/h) and a PHRF handicap of 6 to -12 for the fin keel version and -6 for the centreboard model.

== See also ==
- List of sailing boat types
