= Swan 61 =

Sailboat class

Development
- Designer: Germán Frers
- Location: Finland
- Year: 1985
- No. built: 14
- Builder: Oy Nautor AB
- Role: Cruiser
- Name: Swan 61

Boat
- Displacement: 61,000 lb (27,669 kg)
- Draft: 9.67 ft (2.95 m)

Hull
- Type: monohull
- Construction: glassfibre
- LOA: 60.50 ft (18.44 m)
- LWL: 48.15 ft (14.68 m)
- Beam: 16.42 ft (5.00 m)
- Engine: Volvo Tarnd 30 107 hp (80 kW) inboard diesel engine

Hull appendages
- Keel: Fin keel
- Ballast: 20,300 lb (9,208 kg)
- Rudder: Spade-type rudder

Rig
- Rig type: Bermuda rig
- I foretriangle height: 79.60 ft (24.26 m)
- J foretriangle base: 23.10 ft (7.04 m)
- P mainsail luff: 71.50 ft (21.79 m)
- E mainsail foot: 20.60 ft (6.28 m)

Sails
- Sailplan: Masthead sloop
- Mainsail area: 736.45 sq ft (68.418 m^{2})
- Jib/genoa area: 919.38 sq ft (85.413 m^{2})
- Total sail area: 1,655.83 sq ft (153.832 m^{2})

Racing
- PHRF: 9

The Swan 61 is a Finnish sailboat that was designed by Germán Frers as a blue water cruiser and first built in 1985.

== Production ==
The design was built by Oy Nautor AB in Finland, from 1985 to 1990 with 14 boats completed, but it is now out of production.

== Design ==
The Swan 61 is a recreational keelboat, built predominantly of glassfibre, with wood trim. It has a masthead sloop rig or optionally other rigs, a centre cockpit, a raked stem, a reverse transom or optional angled transom, an internally mounted spade-type rudder controlled by a wheel and a fixed fin keel, optional scheel keel or stub keel and retractable centreboard. It displaces 61,000 lb (27,669 kg) and carries 20,300 lb (9,208 kg) of lead ballast.

The boat has a draft of 9.67 ft (2.95 m) with the standard fin keel.

The boat is fitted with a Swedish Volvo Tarnd 30 107 hp (80 kW) diesel engine for docking and manoeuvring. The fuel tank holds 185 U.S. gallons (700 L; 154 imp gal) and the fresh water tank has a capacity of 277 U.S. gallons (1,050 L; 231 imp gal).

The interiors were custom, but typical is sleeping accommodation for six people, with a double berth in each of two forward cabins, an L-shaped settee and a U-shaped settee in the main cabin and an aft cabin with a double berth on the port side. The galley is located on the port side just aft of the companionway ladder. The galley is C-shaped and is equipped with a stove, an ice box and a double sink. A navigation station is opposite the galley, on the starboard side. There are two heads, one just forward of the bow cabins in the forepeak and one on the port side in the aft cabin.

The design has a hull speed of 9.30 kn (17.22 km/h) and a PHRF handicap of 9.

== See also ==
- List of sailing boat types
