= Germán Frers =

Sailboat designer

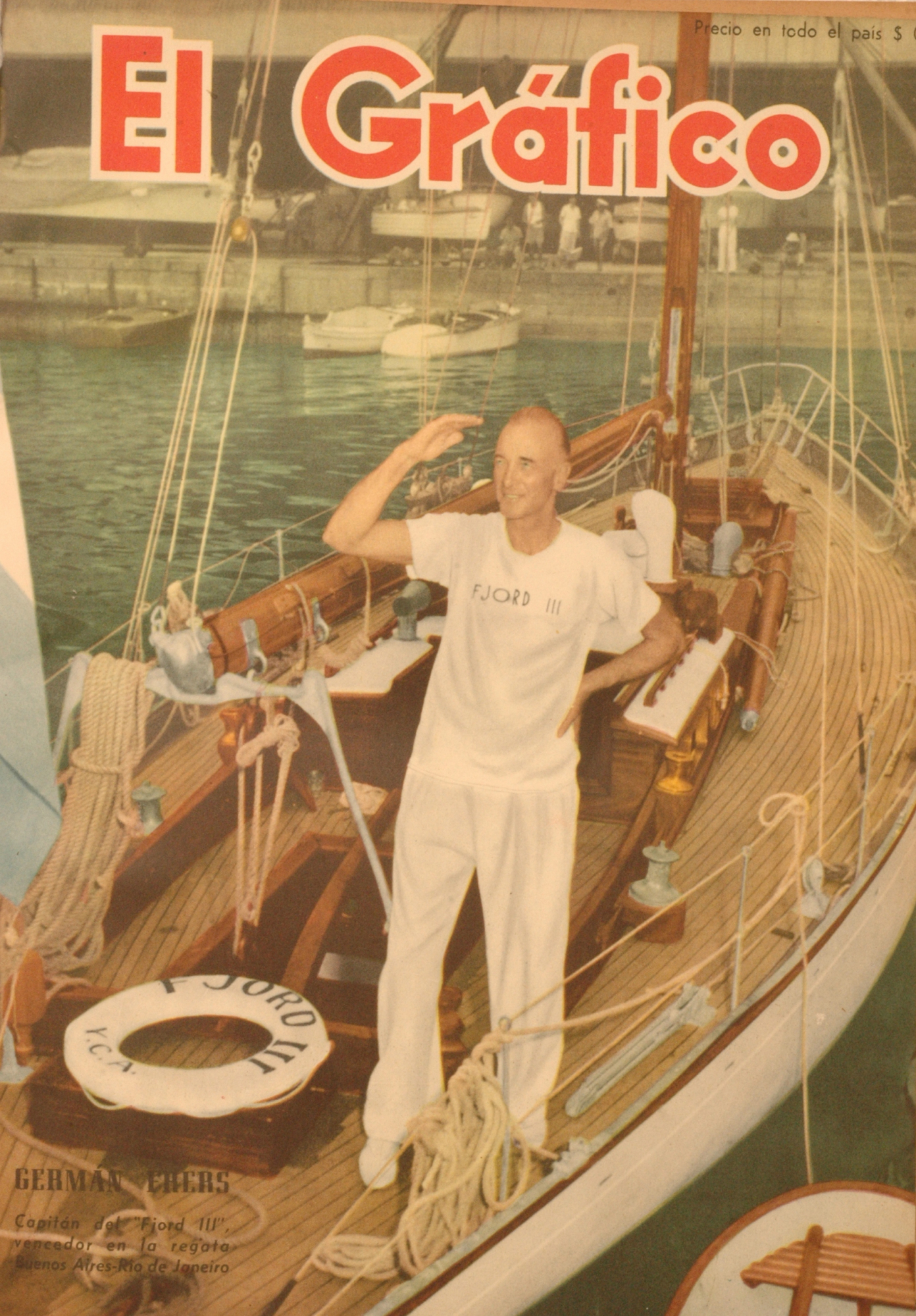

Germán Frers Sr. (born July 4, 1941) is an Argentinian naval architect known for designing racing yachts. He designed his first yacht in 1958 and has been involved in the design of more than 1000 yachts, including Kialoa V and Hyperion, which, when launched in 1997 was the largest sloop ever made.

Yachts designed by the Frers team have won many different yachting events around the world including: the Admiral's Cup, Onion Patch, Bermuda Race, Transpacific, Whitbread Round the World Race, Sardinia Cup, Buenos Aires-Rio Race, S.O.R.C. (Southern Ocean Racing Circuit), Kenwood Cup, Copa del Rey, San Francisco Big Boat Series, Giraglia Race, Settimana delle Bocche, Two Ton Cup World Championship, Martini Middle Sea Race and the Maxi World Championship.

Frers is married to Delfina Serralunga Pes. Their son, Germán Frers Jr., also became a yacht designer, and their daughter, Delfina Frers, is a racing driver.

== Boat designs ==
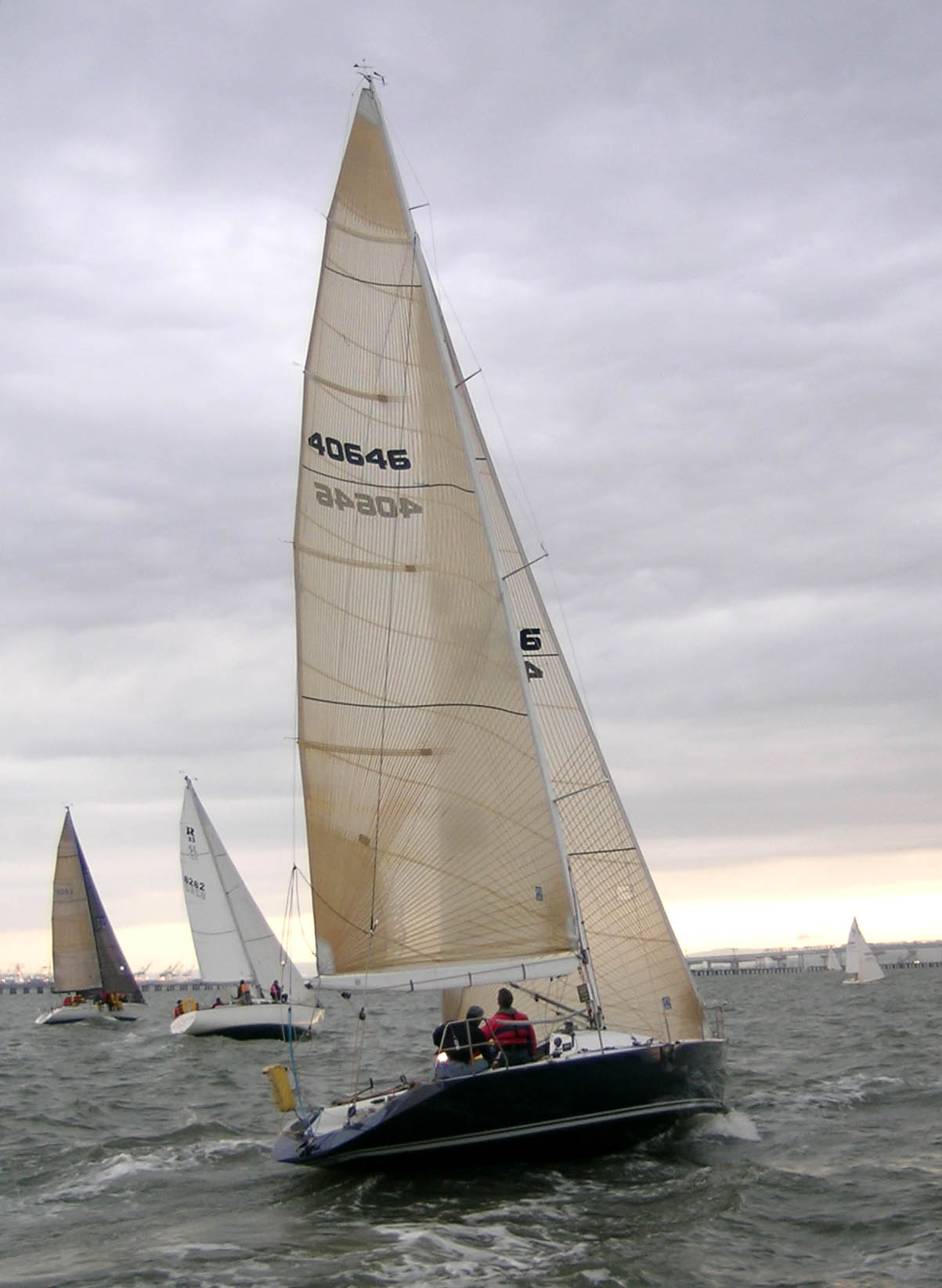
Frers 40 Sloop Jeanette, racing on San Francisco Bay

- ARA Fortuna III
- Beneteau
- Cirrus 3/4 (IOR 3/4 ton); built by Taylor Santander, ES (former shipyard in Spain (seized in 1985)); external link to Cirrus 3/4 page on histoire des halves (largest IOR race sailboat encyclopedia on the Internet)
- CS 50
- CS 395
- Dufour Yachts
- Frers (Tonner Sailboats)
  - Frers 26
- Frers (Carroll Marine)
  - Frers 30
  - Frers 33
  - Frers 36
  - Frers 38
  - Frers 41
  - Frers 45
- Frers (Frers & Cibils)
  - Frers 39
- Sirena Marine: Euphoria Yachts
  - Euphoria 54
  - Euphoria 68
  - Euphoria 84
- Grand Soleil
  - Grand Soleil 42
  - Grand Soleil 45
  - Grand Soleil 52
- Hallberg-Rassy
  - Hallberg-Rassy 31 from 1992
  - Hallberg-Rassy 310
  - Hallberg-Rassy 34 from 1990
  - Hallberg-Rassy 342 from 2005
  - Hallberg-Rassy 36
  - Hallberg-Rassy 37
  - Hallberg-Rassy 372 from 2009
  - Hallberg-Rassy 39 from 1990
  - Hallberg-Rassy 40
  - Hallberg-Rassy 412
  - Hallberg-Rassy 42 from 1991
  - Hallberg-Rassy 43 from 2001
  - Hallberg-Rassy 45
  - Hallberg-Rassy 46 from 1995
  - Hallberg-Rassy 48
  - Hallberg-Rassy 53 from 1996
  - Hallberg-Rassy 54
  - Hallberg-Rassy 55
  - Hallberg-Rassy 62
  - Hallberg-Rassy 64 from 2011
- Kong & Halvorsen
  - Dawn 48
  - Dawn 41
- Hinterhoeller F3
- Nautor's Swan
  - ClubSwan 42
  - Swan 36-2
  - Swan 40 Frers
  - Swan 44 Frers
  - Swan 45
  - Swan 46 Mk I
  - Swan 46 Mk II
  - Swan 46 Mk III
  - Swan 48 Frers
  - Swan 48-3 Frers
  - Swan 51
  - Swan 53 Mk I
  - Swan 53 Mk II
  - Swan 55 Frers
  - Swan 55CC Frers
  - Swan 54
  - Swan 56
  - Swan 57CC Frers
  - Swan 57 RS
  - Swan 58
  - Swan 59
  - Swan 60
  - Swan 61
  - Swan 62
  - Swan 65 Frers
  - Swan 651
  - Swan 66
  - Swan 68
  - Swan 77
  - Swan 78
  - Swan 80
  - Swan 80-2
  - Swan 82
  - Swan 86
  - Swan 88
  - Swan 90
  - Swan 95
  - Swan 98
  - Swan 105 RS
  - Swan 108
  - Swan 115
  - Swan 120
  - Swan 128
  - Swan 131
  - Swan 601
- Niagara 31
- Pandora (former shipyard in Argentina)
  - Pandora 23
  - Pandora 27
  - Pandora 28
  - Pandora 31
- Wally Yachts
- Mystic Yachts
- Hylas Yachts
- D`Angelo 24
- Numerous large yachts, see list of large sailing yachts

== See also ==
- List of sailboat designers and manufacturers
