= ARA Fortuna III =

Argentine Navy yacht

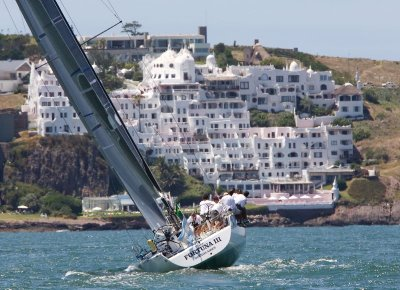
- ARA Fortuna III competes in a regatta.

History

Argentina
- Name: Fortuna III
- Builder: Taller de Mantenimiento Buenos Aires
- Laid down: 1999
- Launched: 16 October 2004

General characteristics
- Displacement: 15.5 tons
- Length: 18.3 m
- Beam: 4.54 m
- Draught: 3.60 m

The Fortuna III is a yacht owned and operated by the Argentine Navy. The ship was designed by naval architect German Frers, and she is built in carbon fiber. Fortuna III set the sailing record of 24 hours and two minutes between Buenos Aires and Mar del Plata in 2009, at an average speed of 10.5 knots.
