= Swan 59 =

Sailboat class

Development
- Designer: Germán Frers
- Location: Finland
- Year: 1984
- No. built: 21
- Builder: Oy Nautor AB
- Role: Cruiser-Racer
- Name: Swan 59

Boat
- Displacement: 62,400 lb (28,304 kg)
- Draft: 11.18 ft (3.41 m)

Hull
- Type: monohull
- Construction: glassfibre
- LOA: 58.67 ft (17.88 m)
- LWL: 48.15 ft (14.68 m)
- Beam: 16.40 ft (5.00 m)
- Engine: Volvo TMD31A diesel engine

Hull appendages
- Keel: Fin keel
- Ballast: 22,800 lb (10,342 kg)
- Rudder: Spade-type rudder

Rig
- Rig type: Bermuda rig

Sails
- Sailplan: Masthead sloop

Racing
- PHRF: 6-12

The Swan 59 is a Finnish sailboat that was designed by Germán Frers as a cruiser-racer and first built in 1984.

== Production ==
The design was built by Oy Nautor AB in Finland, from 1984 until 1990, with 21 boats completed, an average of three per year.

== Design ==
The Swan 59 is a recreational keelboat, built predominantly of glassfibre, with wood trim. It has a masthead sloop rig, a raked stem, a reverse transom, an internally mounted spade-type rudder controlled by a wheel and a fixed fin keel or optional stub keel and retractable centreboard. It displaces 62,400 lb (28,304 kg) and carries 22,800 lb (10,342 kg) of lead ballast.

The keel-equipped version of the boat has a draft of 11.18 ft (3.41 m), while the centerboard-equipped version has a draft of 9.75 ft (2.97 m) with the centerboard extended and 4.0 ft (1.2 m) with it retracted, allowing operation in shallow water.

The boat is fitted with a Swedish Volvo TMD31A diesel engine for docking and manoeuvring. The fuel tank holds 264 U.S. gallons (1,000 L; 220 imp gal) and the fresh water tank has a capacity of 277 U.S. gallons (1,050 L; 231 imp gal).

The design has sleeping accommodation for six people, with two forward cabins, each with two bunk beds, an L-shaped settee and a U-shaped settee in the main cabin and an aft cabin with a central island double berth. The galley is located on the port side abeam the companionway ladder. The galley is C-shaped and is equipped with a three-burner stove, an ice box and a double sink. A navigation station is opposite the galley, on the starboard side. There are two heads, one in the forepeak and one on the port side in the aft cabin.

The design has a hull speed of 9.30 kn (17.22 km/h) and a PHRF handicap of six to 12 for the fin keel model and 12 to 24 for the centreboard, short mast model.

== Operational history ==
In the summer of 2019, Andy Schell captained his Swan 59 on a cruise including the south shore of Newfoundland, exploring fjords, whale and iceberg watching. His crew included retired US senator Tom Harkin. The voyage was described in an article published in Yachting World.

== See also ==
- List of sailing boat types
