= Asymmetrical spinnaker =

Type of sail

An asymmetrical spinnaker is a sail used when sailing between about 90 and 165 degrees from the angle of the wind. Also known as an "asym", "aspin", "A-sail", or gennaker, it can be described as a cross between a genoa (jib) and a spinnaker. It is asymmetric like a genoa, but like a spinnaker, its luff is unstructured and floats freely, unencumbered by an internal wire or hanks attaching it to a stay. Unlike a symmetric spinnaker, the asymmetric does not require a spinnaker pole, since it is fixed (tacked) to the bow or a bowsprit.

When attached to a long bowsprit or "prod", an asymmetrical spinnaker can be larger than a conventional spinnaker, since it can be carried further forward of the boat than is possible with a conventional spinnaker pole and the foot of the sail can extend to deck level. Many modern sailboats have retractable bowsprits to enable this expansion.

The asymmetrical spinnaker has a larger camber than a genoa and a Spinnaker Mid-Gerth (SMG) -- also called Spinnaker Half Width (SHW) -- measurement greater than the length of its foot (a genoa is a pin-head sail so its mid-gerth dimension is shorter than its foot).

An asymmetrical spinnaker generates more lift at larger angles of attack than a genoa, providing the boat with more power when the apparent wind speed is dropping. It can be also carried at smaller angles to the wind than a conventional spinnaker. Since the apparent winds are higher at small angles, the boat should sail faster than it would with a conventional spinnaker since more power can be generated. This may not, however, result in faster progress to a downwind destination. Since an asymmetric spinnaker is positioned to leeward and behind the mainsail, and since it has a flatter shape than a conventional spinnaker, an asymmetrical may not sail as deeply downwind. This is demonstrated by a Polar diagram (sailing) showing the theoretical predicted boat speeds and carrying angles of a symmetrical vs. an asymmetrical spinnaker.

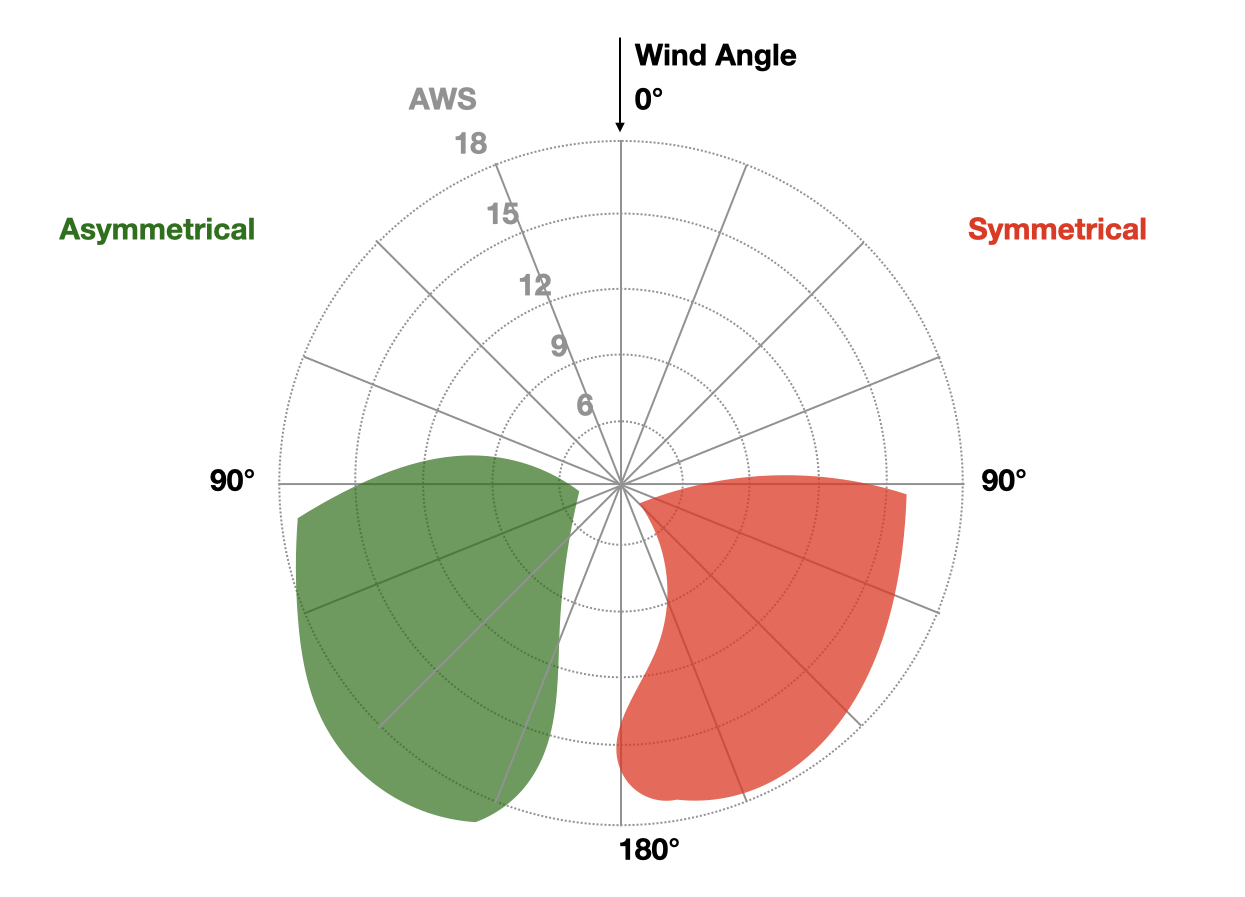
Polar diagram comparing the speeds and carrying angles of symmetrical with asymmetrical spinnakers when sailing

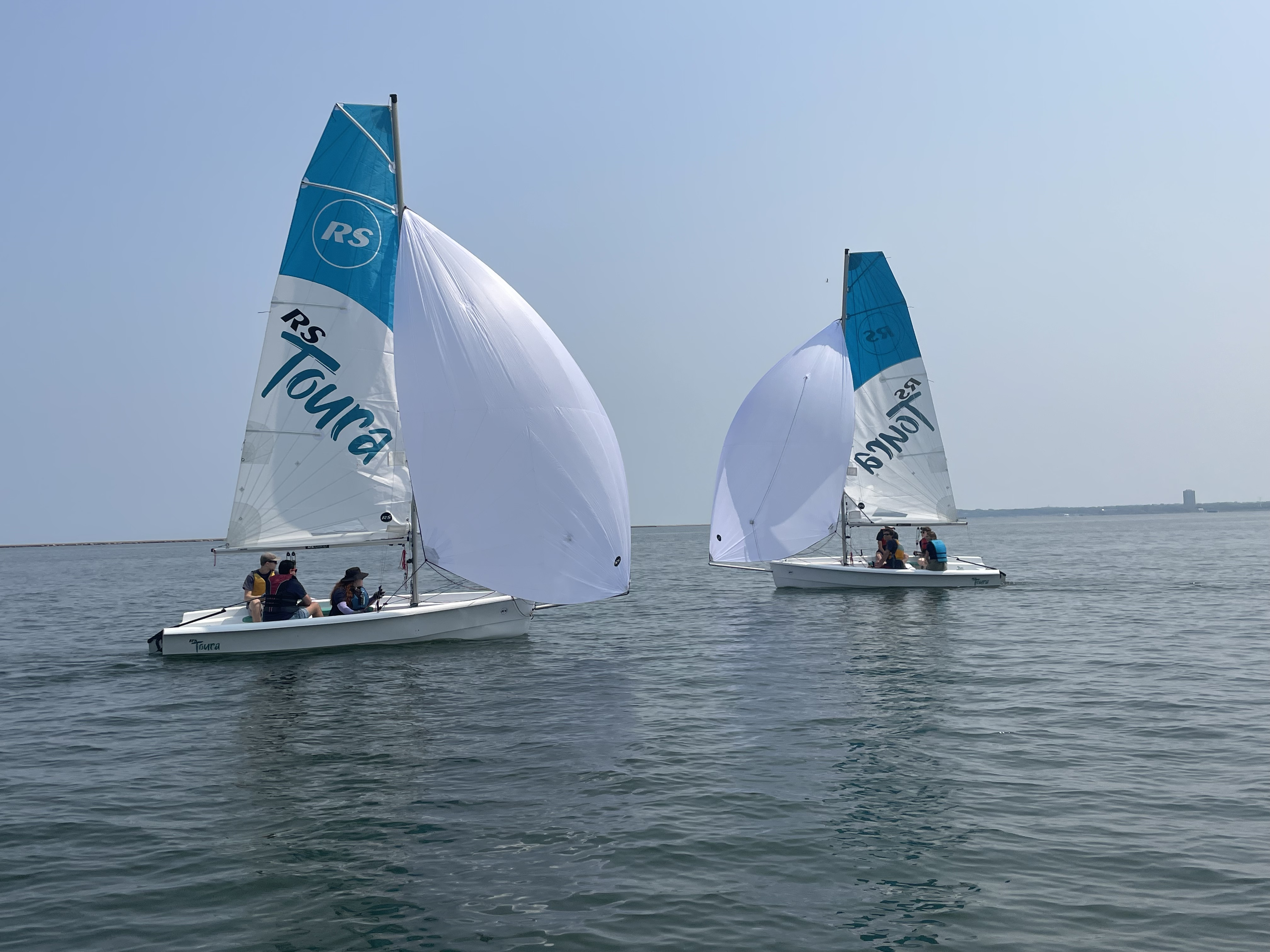
Two sailboats flying asymmetrical spinnakers beam reaching in light wind

On cruising sailboats, a modestly sized asymmetrical spinnaker can be tacked to a centerline bow pulpit, anchor roller or a furled headsail, and can be known by other names, like "cruising chute" or a gennaker. In this duty, it is often paired with a Spinnaker chute or "sock" for simpler or short-handed setting and retrieving.

If the spinnaker is mounted to a bow pulpit or short bowsprit, it may not be possible to fly the spinnaker and the jib at the same time, since the spinnaker will be shadowed by the jib. In this duty, the jib should be dropped or furled when the spinnaker is in use.

== Rigging and Gybing ==
Rigging is different from conventional spinnakers. Since there is no spinnaker pole, there is no longer need for a pole topping lift or a pole downhaul. Like a jib, the asymmetric has two sheets and no "guy". The asymmetric is simpler to gybe than a conventional spinnaker since it only requires releasing a sheet and pulling in the other one, passing the sail in front of the forestay. An optional adjustable tack-line can be eased to allow the tack to lift, enabling the sail to also lift and its shoulders to rotate windward for deeper downwind angles.

Depending on the design and size of the boat, sail and position of the tack, asymmetrical spinnaker sheets may be led to pass between the spinnaker and the headstay or, alternatively, outside of the spinnaker during a gybe. An inside gybe requires space for the spinnaker to pass between its luff and the headstay. An outside gybe requires longer sheets and a method to prevent the lazy sheet from dropping below the sprit and tangling.

An asymmetric spinnaker is particularly effective on fast planing dinghies and ultra-light displacement boats as their speed generates an apparent wind on the bow allowing them to sail more directly downwind. An asymmetric spinnaker can also be a simpler sail for a cruiser or short-handed sailer than a symmetric one.

== History and Impact ==
In the 1960, catamaran sailors discovered that it is faster to sail downwind on a series of broad reaches with efficient airflow across the sail rather than directly downwind with the sails stalled. This technique had developed to the extent that in bar conversation at the end of one season Andrew Buckland observed that 18 Foot Skiffs had sailed all season (1982/83) without pulling the spinnaker pole back from the forestay and that all the systems could be simplified by eliminating the pole and setting the spinnaker from a bowsprit. The concept quickly evolved to a sail with a loose luff. Buckland collaborated with sailmaker Julian Bethwaite to rig and sail the first prototypes. The first modern keelboat to incorporate a retractable bow sprit and an asymmetric spinnaker was the popular J/Boats J/105 designed in 1992.

The concept has spread rapidly through the sailing world and has inspired the development of "code" or "flying" sails, a family of hybrid sail designs that often combine a structured luff with positive mid-gerth that are used for very fast beam reaching and higher angles and may be furled.
