= Maritime geography =

Collection of terms used by naval military units

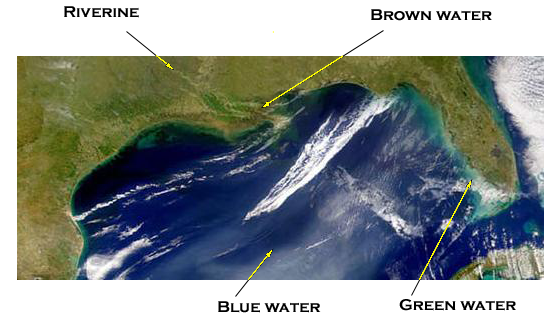
The four kinds of navigable water in the Gulf of Mexico.

Maritime geography is a collection of terms used by naval military units to loosely define three maritime regions: brown water, green water, and blue water.

== Definitions ==
The elements of maritime geography are loosely defined and their meanings have changed throughout history. The USA's 2010 Naval Operations Concept defines blue water as "the open ocean", green water as "coastal waters, ports and harbors", and brown water as "navigable rivers and their estuaries". Robert Rubel of the US Naval War College includes bays in his definition of brown water, and in the past US military commentators have extended brown water out to 100 nautical miles (190 km) from shore.

During the Cold War, green water denoted those areas of ocean in which naval forces might encounter land-based aircraft and brown water, land-based artillery. The development of long-range bombers with antiship missiles turned most of the oceans to "green" and the term all but disappeared. After the Cold War, US amphibious taskforces were sometimes referred to as the green-water navy, in contrast to the blue-water carrier battlegroups. This distinction disappeared as increasing threats in coastal waters forced the amphibious ships further offshore, delivering assaults by helicopter and tiltrotor from over the horizon. This prompted the development of ships designed to operate in such waters - the Zumwalt class destroyer and the littoral combat ships. Rubel has proposed redefining green water as those areas of ocean which are too dangerous for high-value units, requiring offensive power to be dispersed into smaller vessels such as submarines that can use stealth and other characteristics to survive. Under his scheme brown water would be zones in which ocean-going units could not operate at all, including rivers, minefields, straits and other choke points.

== Regions ==
=== Brown water ===
The brown water environment starts from the shoreline through to the end of the continental shelf. A brown-water navy focuses on littoral operations and primarily takes a defensive role. "Brown water" or "brown ocean" is also used by meteorologists to refer to intertidal wetlands where the border between the ocean and dry land is not clear-cut.

=== Green water ===
The green water environment extends from the outer edge of the brown-water layer past any continental shelves, archipelagos and islands; perhaps a few hundred miles from shore. It is the most important maritime arena, including most coastal traffic and territorial waters, in which are found the great majority of a nation's maritime police, customs, environmental, and economic concerns. A green-water navy is capable of defense of its nation in depth and is a significant offensive force within its territory.

=== Blue water ===
The blue water environment extends from the outer edge of the green-water zone to the deep ocean of the world. A blue-water navy can project its nation's power throughout the world. The blue water policy was a long-standing political philosophy in Britain in the 18th century, which sought to advance British power through use of the Royal Navy, although the term "blue water" did not appear until 1834.

== See also ==
- Littoral zone
