= Spreader (sailboat) =

Component of the rigging of a boat

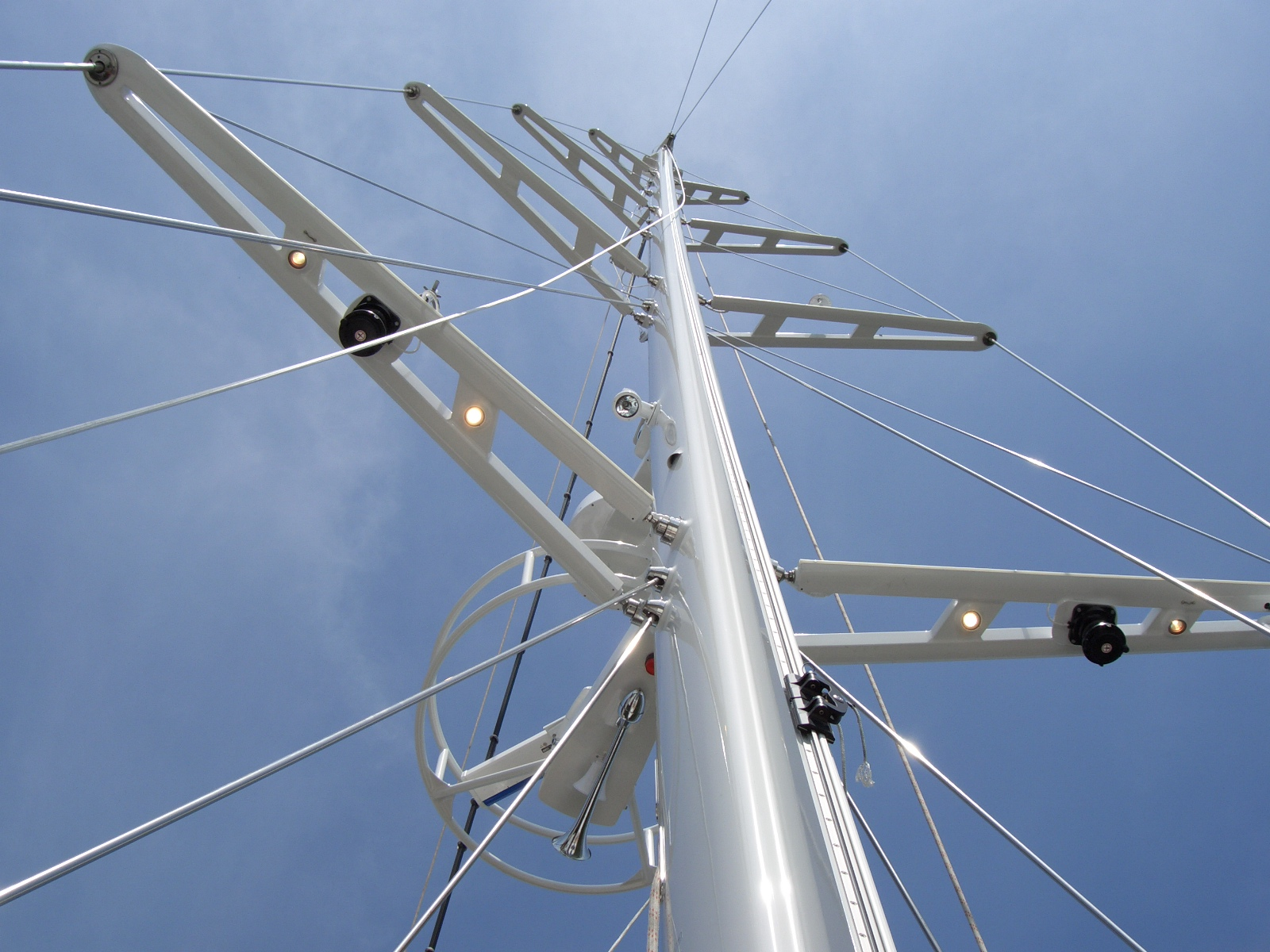
Four sets of swept and fixed spreaders on a large yacht

A spreader is a spar on a sailing boat used to deflect the shrouds to allow them to better support the mast. The spreader or spreaders serve much the same purpose as the crosstrees and tops in a traditional sailing vessel.

Spreaders are used to increase the angle between the rigging and the mast, providing better support, and to adjust the mast's shape and bend. This allows the mast and rigging to be lighter and thinner, reducing their total weight. Spreaders may be made of metal, often aluminium; wood, often spruce; or composite material such as carbon fiber.

Spreader design and tuning can be quite complex. The spreaders may be fixed (rigid) or swinging (pivoted at the mast). Most cruising boats have fixed spreaders, but swinging spreaders are found on some racing boats. The length of a boat's beam determines how long the spreaders may be, so some boats have multiple sets of spreaders so the shroud can reach the desired angle from the mast. Boats with tall masts, such as racing yachts, may have up to five sets.
