= Swan 371 =

Finnish sailboat designed by Ron Holland for racing and first built 1979

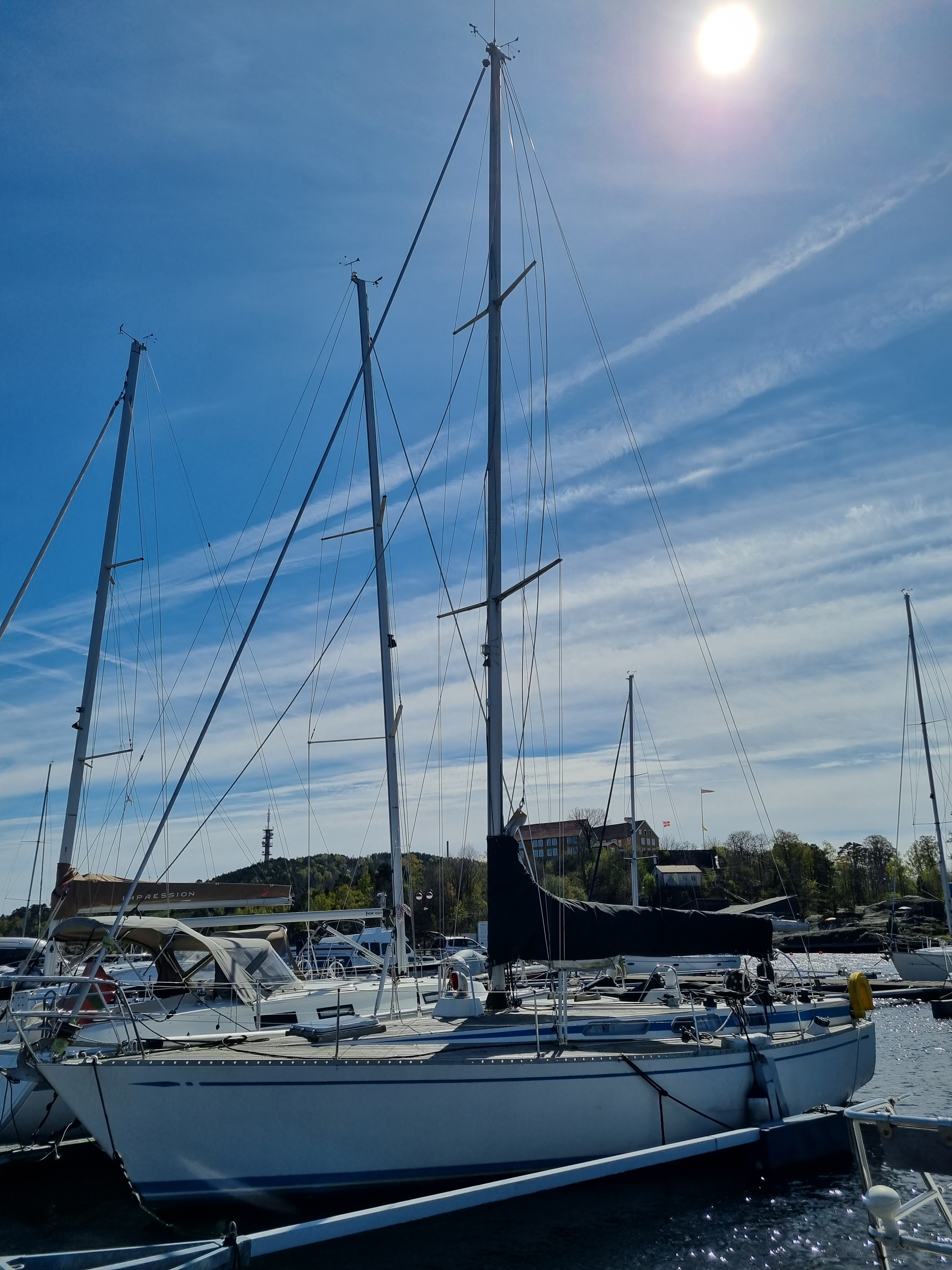
- A Swan 371 docked at Otterdalen in Kristiansand, Norway

Development
- Designer: Ron Holland
- Location: Finland
- Year: 1979
- No. built: 87
- Brand: Swan
- Builder: Nautor Swan OY
- Role: Racer
- Name: Swan 371

Boat
- Displacement: 7,303 kg (16,100 lb)
- Draft: 2.07 m (6.8 ft)

Hull
- Type: Monohull
- Construction: fiberglass
- LOH: 11.28 m (37.0 ft)
- LWL: 9.06 m (29.7 ft)
- Beam: 3.46 m (11.4 ft)

Hull appendages
- Ballast: 2,586 kg (5,701 lb)
- Rudder: Spade rudder

Rig
- Rig type: Masthead sloop
- I foretriangle height: 14.26 m (46.8 ft)
- J foretriangle base: 4.57 m (15.0 ft)
- P mainsail luff: 12.50 m (41.0 ft)
- E mainsail foot: 3.66 m (12.0 ft)

Sails
- Mainsail area: 22.85 m^{2} (246.0 sq ft)
- Jib/genoa area: 32.61 m^{2} (351.0 sq ft)

Racing
- PHRF: 120 (average)

The Swan 371 is a Finnish sailboat that was designed by Ron Holland for racing and first built in 1979.

== Production ==
The design was built by Nautor's Swan in Finland, starting in 1979. A total of 87 boats were completed by the time production ended.

== Design ==
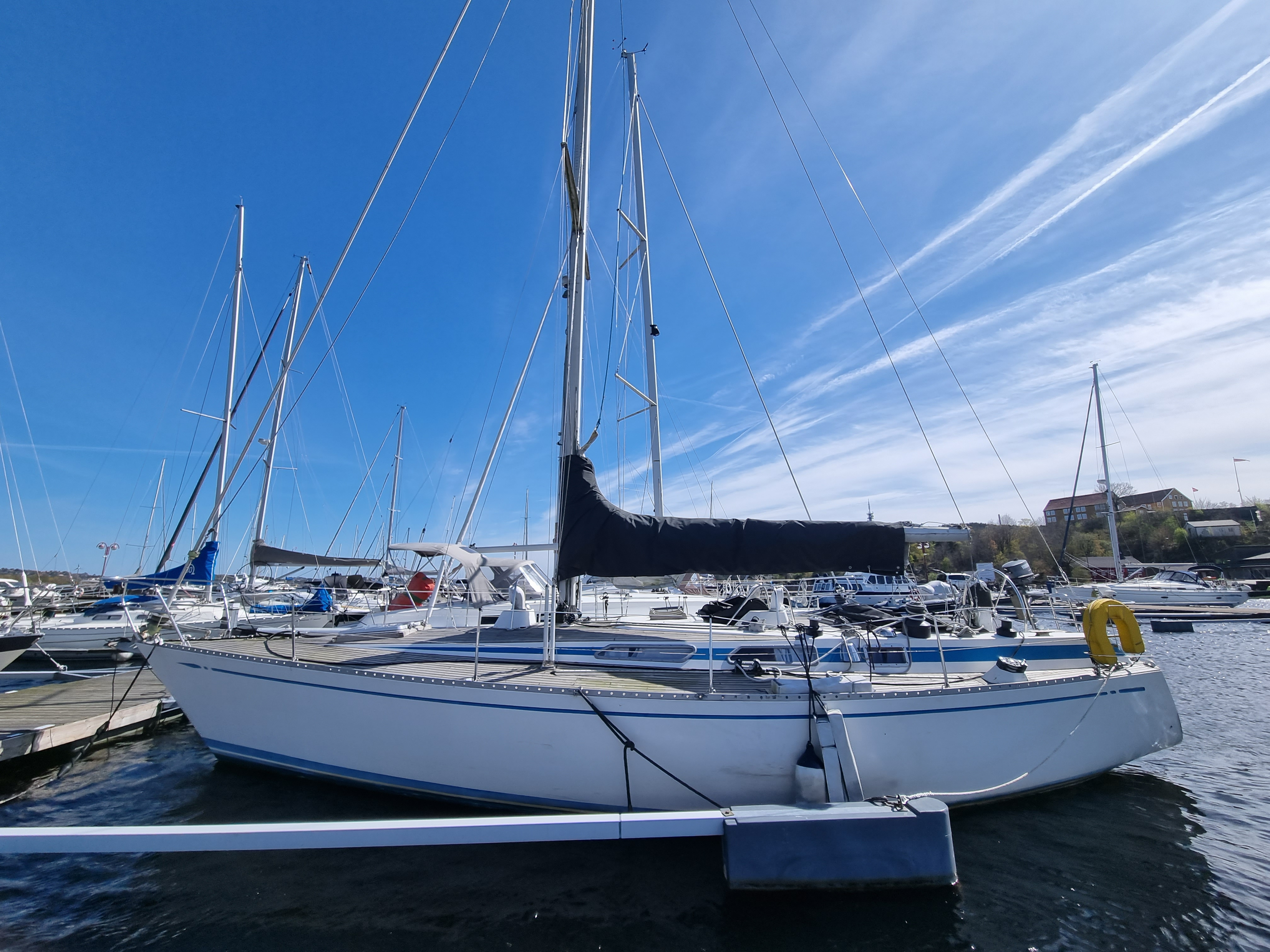
Swan 371

The Swan 371 is a recreational keelboat, built predominantly of fiberglass, with teak wood trim. It has a masthead sloop rig, a raked stem, a raised reverse transom, an internally mounted spade-type rudder controlled by a wheel and a fixed fin keel. It displaces 16,100 lb (7,303 kg) and carries 5,700 lb (2,585 kg) of lead ballast.

The boat has a draft of 6.80 ft (2.07 m) with the standard keel fitted.

The boat is fitted with a British Bukh diesel engine of 20 hp (15 kW). The fuel tank holds 37 U.S. gallons (140 L; 31 imp gal) and the fresh water tank has a capacity of 66 U.S. gallons (250 L; 55 imp gal).

The accommodations consist of a large master cabin. The forward cabin is the sail locker and also has two pipe berths. There are two berths in the transom and one or optionally two, pilot berths, plus a single and a double quarter berth. The main cabin features a drop-leaf table that can be removed and stowed for more space. The head includes a hand-held shower and a skylight. The galley includes an ice chest that can also be optionally electrically refrigerated. The navigation station is located opposite the galley and has under-table chart stowage space provided. Ventilation is provided by one hatch of the foredeck, two main cabin ports that open, and an opening port from the cockpit. Liferaft stowage is also provided on deck. All woodwork above and below decks is made from teak.

Equipment includes two halyard winches on the coach house roof, two genoa sheet winches on the cockpit coaming, plus two additional winches for spinnaker sheeting. The genoa tracks are inboard. An additional deck eye is provided for a staysail.

The design has a PHRF racing average handicap of 120 with a high of 132 and low of 114. It has a hull speed of 7.31 kn (13.54 km/h).

== See also ==
- List of sailing boat types
