= Swan 112 RS =

Sailboat designed by German Frers

Development
- Location: Finland
- Year: 1999 - 2006
- No. built: 5
- Brand: Swan
- Builder: Nautor Swan OY

Boat
- Displacement: 110,000 kg (240,000 lb)
- Draft: 4.40 m (14.4 ft)

Hull
- Type: Monohull
- LOH: 34.54 m (113.3 ft)
- LWL: 28.16 m (92.4 ft)
- Beam: 7.42 m (24.3 ft)
- Engine: MTU 414hp

Hull appendages
- Ballast: 28,000 kg (62,000 lb)

Rig
- Rig type: Masthead
- I foretriangle height: 40.80 m (133.9 ft)
- J foretriangle base: 12.10 m (39.7 ft)
- P mainsail luff: 36.87 m (121.0 ft)
- E mainsail foot: 12.90 m (42.3 ft)

Sails
- Mainsail area: 237.8 m^{2} (2,560 sq ft)
- Jib/genoa area: Unknown
- Gennaker area: 712 m^{2} (7,660 sq ft)
- Other sails: 345.5 m^{2} (3,719 sq ft) Reacher

The Swan 112 RS was a Sailboat designed by German Frers and built by Nautor's Swan and first launched in 1999, it was the largest boat the yard had produced at this time until introduction of the Swan 131 six years later.

The first megayacht made by this builder, it was luxurious but also designed with ergonomics in mind so that it could be crewed by a modest four person complement.
