= Swan 38 (yacht) =

Sailboat class

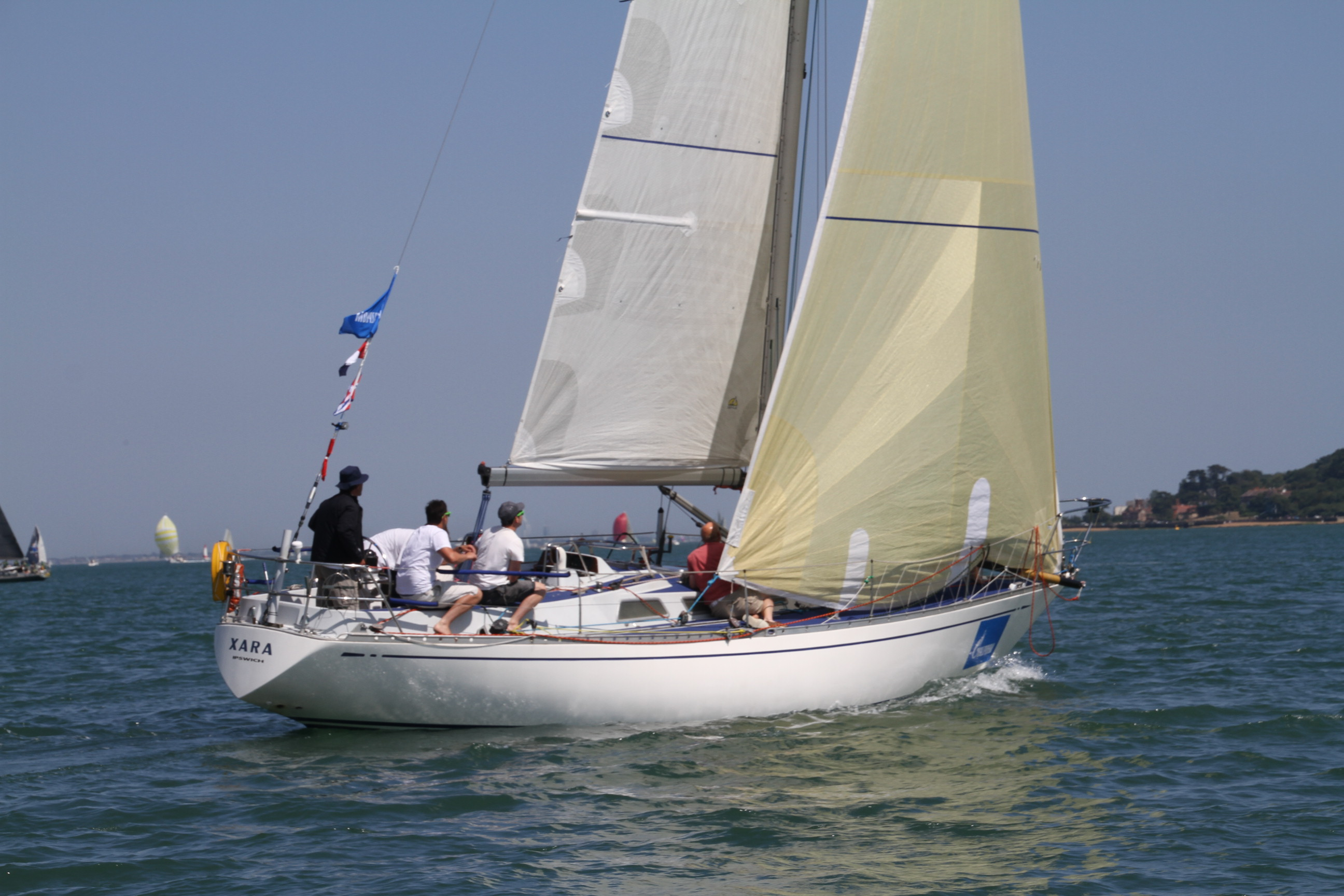

Development
- Designer: Olin Stephens of Sparkman & Stephens
- Location: Finland
- Year: 1974
- No. built: 116
- Builder: Oy Nautor AB
- Role: Cruiser-Racer
- Name: Swan 38

Boat
- Displacement: 18,300 lb (8,301 kg)
- Draft: 6.30 ft (1.92 m)

Hull
- Type: monohull
- Construction: glassfibre
- LOA: 38.25 ft (11.66 m)
- LWL: 28.71 ft (8.75 m)
- Beam: 11.55 ft (3.52 m)
- Engine: Bukh & Gry DV 20 ME 20 hp (15 kW) diesel engine

Hull appendages
- Keel: fin keel
- Ballast: 7,100 lb (3,221 kg)
- Rudder: skeg-mounted rudder

Rig
- Rig type: Bermuda rig
- I foretriangle height: 51.00 ft (15.54 m)
- J foretriangle base: 15.81 ft (4.82 m)
- P mainsail luff: 42.25 ft (12.88 m)
- E mainsail foot: 12.50 ft (3.81 m)

Sails
- Sailplan: masthead sloop
- Mainsail area: 264.06 sq ft (24.532 m^{2})
- Jib/genoa area: 403.16 sq ft (37.455 m^{2})
- Total sail area: 667.22 sq ft (61.987 m^{2})

Racing
- PHRF: 114-128

The Swan 38 is a Finnish sailboat that was designed by Olin Stephens of Sparkman & Stephens as a cruiser-racer and first built in 1974. It is Sparkman & Stephens design #2167. A special reduced sail area version was also produced to comply with the One Ton class rules.

== Production ==
The design was built by Oy Nautor AB in Finland, from 1974 until 1979, with 116 boats completed, but it is now out of production.

== Design ==
The Swan 38 is a racing keelboat, built predominantly of glassfibre, with wood trim and aluminum spars. The hull is made from solid glassfibre, reinforced with a galvanized I-beam. It has a masthead sloop rig, a raked stem, a raised counter reverse transom, a skeg-mounted rudder controlled by a wheel and a fixed fin keel. It displaces 18,300 lb (8,301 kg) and carries 7,100 lb (3,221 kg) of lead ballast.

The boat has a draft of 6.30 ft (1.92 m) with the standard keel. It is fitted with a Danish Bukh & Gry DV 20 ME diesel engine of 20 hp (15 kW) for docking and manoeuvring. The fuel tank holds 30 U.S. gallons (110 L; 25 imp gal).

The design has sleeping accommodation for five people, with a double "V"-berth in the bow cabin, two straight settees in the main cabin and an aft cabin with a single berth to port and double berth on the starboard side. The galley is located on the starboard side just forward of the companionway ladder. The galley is L-shaped and is equipped with a three-burner stove, an ice box and a sink. A navigation station is opposite the galley, on the port side. The head is located just aft of the bow cabin on the port side. The fresh water tank has a capacity of 53 U.S. gallons (200 L; 44 imp gal). Cabin maximum headroom is 72 in (183 cm).

For sailing downwind the design may be equipped with a symmetrical spinnaker.

The design has a hull speed of 7.18 kn (13.30 km/h) and a PHRF handicap of 114 to 128.

== Operational history ==
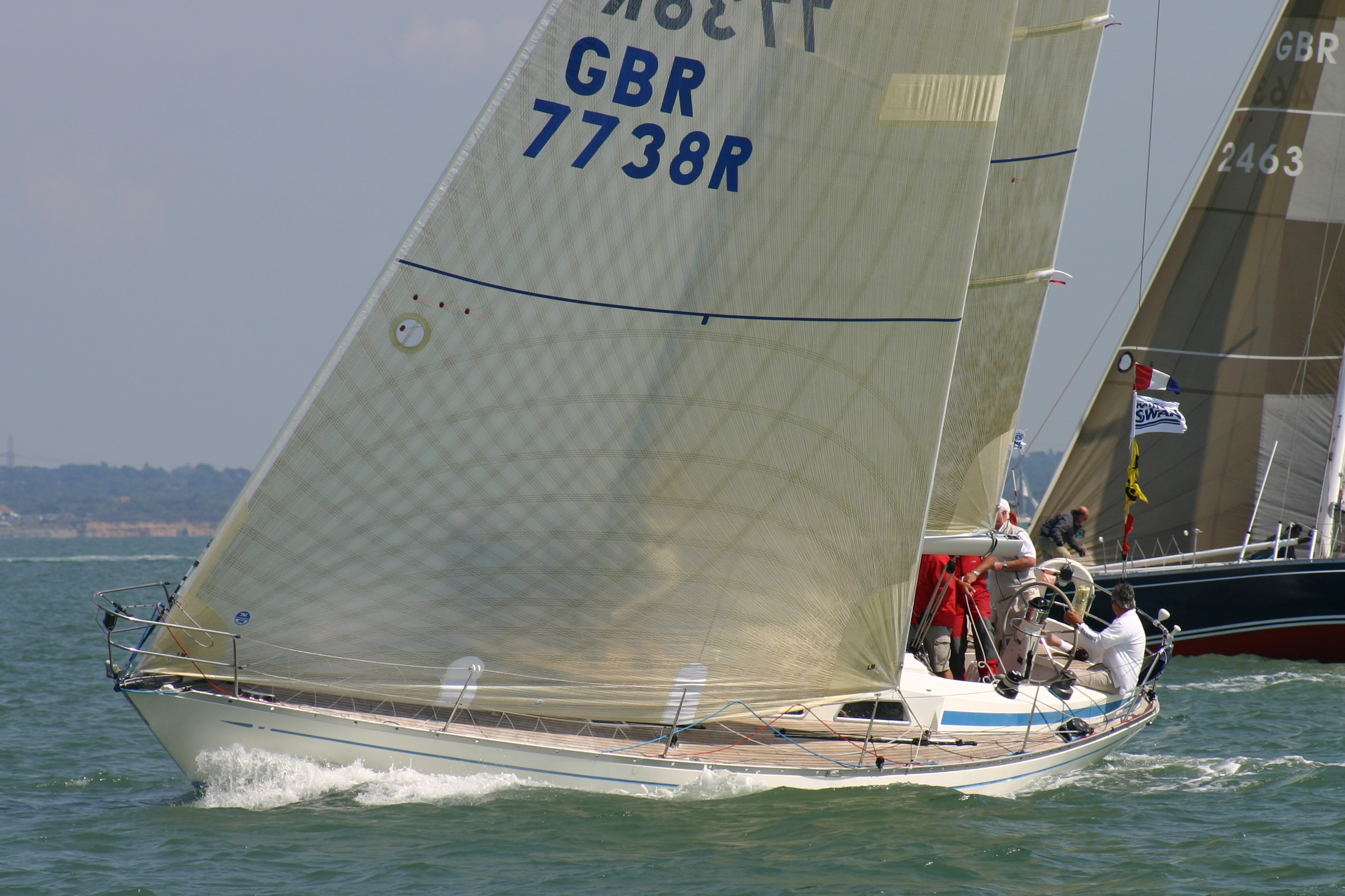
Swan 38

The boat was at one time supported by a class club that organized racing events, the One Ton Class.

In a 2003 boats.com review, concluded, "There are many commendable aspects to the Swan 38. It's a pleasure to look at and an even greater pleasure to sail. With a windvane bolted on the stern, a flexible water tank added in the bow, a solar panel or two and a bit of wanderlust, the 38 will take you anywhere in the world you want to go, especially if some of that is to windward ... The Swan 38 will not be the boat for every couple. But for sailors who love to sail, who get a thrill out of solid windward performance, and enjoy a boat that stands up to a blow, the 38 is a good choice. It's the type of boat that can be kept for a lifetime of sailing, without losing value or paling in a sailor's eye. Not the grandest, fastest or most beautiful boat ever designed by the maestroes Stephens, the Swan 38 is still a great little masterpiece of an ocean-sailing yacht."

== See also ==
- List of sailing boat types
