= Swan 42 =

Sailboat class

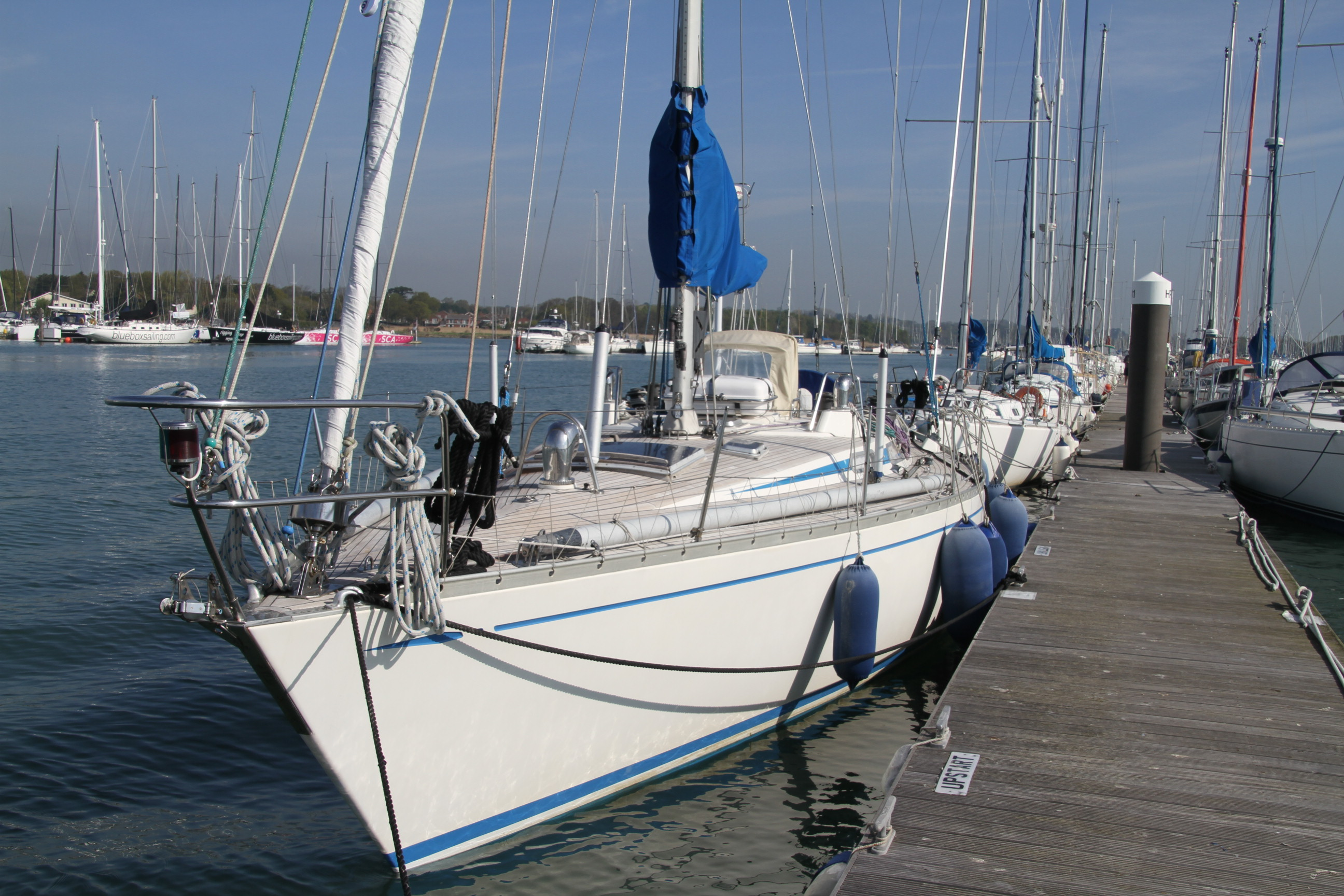

Development
- Designer: Ron Holland
- Location: Finland
- Year: 1980
- No. built: 38
- Builder: Oy Nautor AB
- Role: Cruiser-Racer
- Name: Swan 42

Boat
- Displacement: 22,000 lb (9,979 kg)
- Draft: 7.80 ft (2.38 m)

Hull
- Type: monohull
- Construction: glassfibre
- LOA: 42.00 ft (12.80 m)
- LWL: 33.83 ft (10.31 m)
- Beam: 12.96 ft (3.95 m)
- Engine: Perkins Engines 4-108 40 hp (30 kW) diesel engine

Hull appendages
- Keel: fin keel
- Ballast: 9,200 lb (4,173 kg)
- Rudder: Spade-type rudder

Rig
- Rig type: Bermuda rig
- I foretriangle height: 54.90 ft (16.73 m)
- J foretriangle base: 16.70 ft (5.09 m)
- P mainsail luff: 48.80 ft (14.87 m)
- E mainsail foot: 14.10 ft (4.30 m)

Sails
- Sailplan: Masthead sloop
- Mainsail area: 343 sq ft (31.9 m^{2})
- Jib/genoa area: 686 sq ft (63.7 m^{2})
- Spinnaker area: 1,647 sq ft (153.0 m^{2})
- Upwind sail area: 1,029 sq ft (95.6 m^{2})
- Downwind sail area: 1,990 sq ft (185 m^{2})

Racing
- PHRF: 78-87

The Swan 42 is a Finnish sailboat that was designed by Ron Holland as a cruiser-racer and first built in 1980.

== Production ==
The design was built by Oy Nautor AB in Finland, from 1980 to 1985, with 38 boats completed, but it is now out of production.

== Design ==
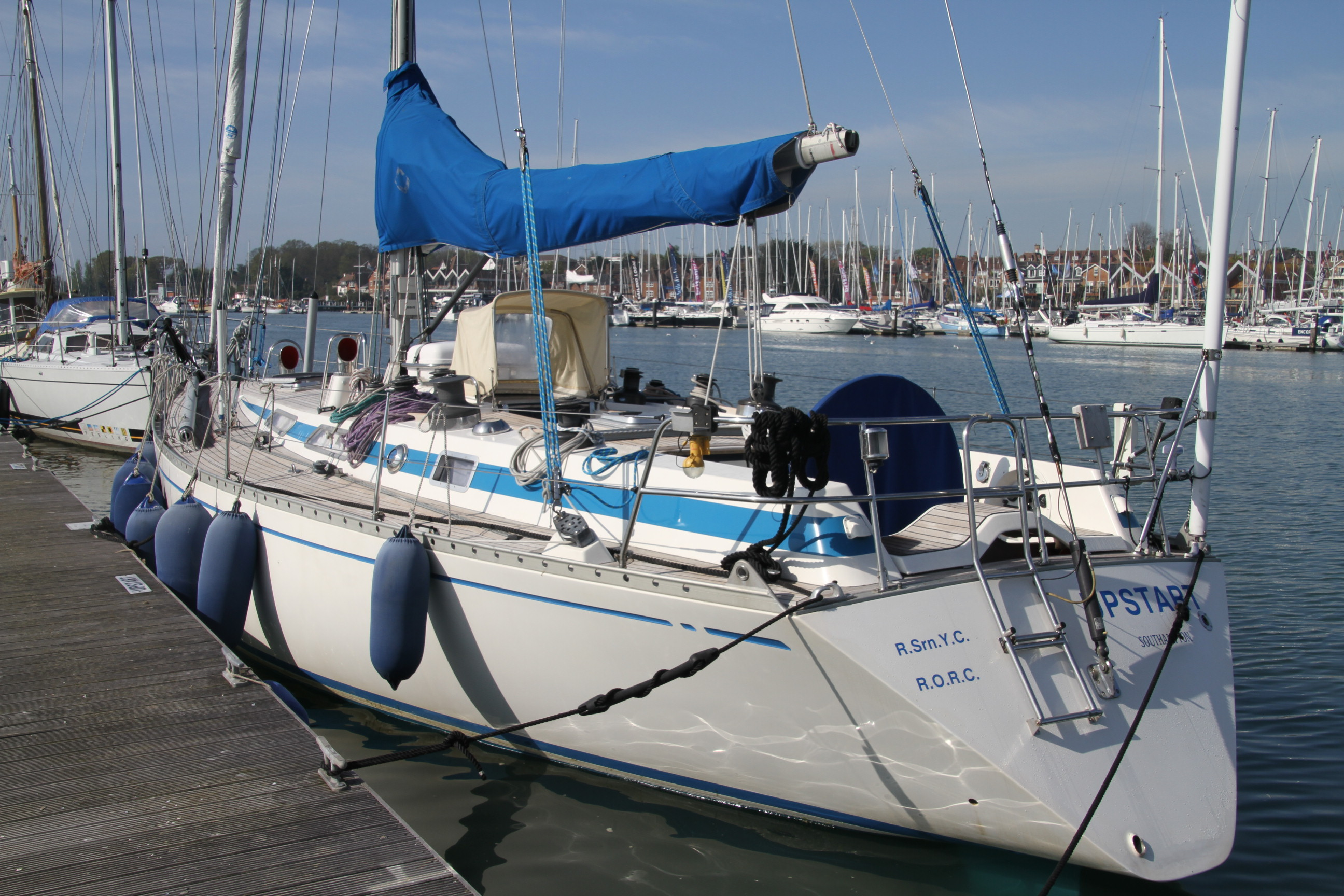
Swan 42 showing the transom

The boat was based on the 1979 Admiral's Cup design, Regardless, the only boat to win two races in that regatta. It uses a deck and interior derived from the Swan 441 and Swan 44.

The Swan 42 is a recreational keelboat, built predominantly of glassfibre, with wood trim. It has a masthead sloop rig, with a keel-stepped mast, two sets of unswept spreaders and aluminium spars with 1X19 stainless steel wire rigging. The hull has a raked stem, a reverse transom, an internally mounted spade-type rudder controlled by a wheel and a fixed fin keel or optional shoal-draft keel. It displaces 22,000 lb (9,979 kg) and carries 9,200 lb (4,173 kg) of lead ballast.

The boat has a draft of 7.80 ft (2.38 m) with the standard keel and 5.92 ft (1.80 m) with the optional shoal draft keel.

The boat is fitted with a British Perkins Engines 4-108 diesel engine of 40 hp (30 kW) for docking and manoeuvring. The fuel tank holds 42 U.S. gallons (160 L; 35 imp gal) and the fresh water tank has a capacity of 79 U.S. gallons (300 L; 66 imp gal).

The design has sleeping accommodation for nine people, with a double "V"-berth in the bow cabin, an L-shaped settee and a straight settee in the main cabin along with two pilot berths and an aft cabin with a double berth on the starboard side and a single berth to port. The galley is located on the port side just forward of the companionway ladder. The galley is L-shaped and is equipped with a three-burner stove, an ice box and a double sink. A navigation station is opposite the galley, on the starboard side. The head is located aft of the companionway on the starboard.

For sailing downwind the design may be equipped with a symmetrical spinnaker of 1,647 sq ft (153.0 m^{2}).

The design has a hull speed of 7.79 kn (14.43 km/h) and a PHRF handicap of 78-87 with the fin keel and 87 with the shoal draft keel.

== See also ==
- List of sailing boat types
