= Swan 82 =

Sailboat class

Swan 82 S
Development
- Designer: Germán Frers
- Location: Finland
- Year: 2002
- No. built: 7
- Builder: Oy Nautor AB
- Role: Cruiser-Racer

Boat
- Displacement: 90,400 lb (41,005 kg)
- Draft: 11.48 ft (3.50 m)

Hull
- Type: monohull
- Construction: glassfibre
- LOA: 81.66 ft (24.89 m)
- LWL: 69.75 ft (21.26 m)
- Beam: 19.22 ft (5.86 m)
- Engine: Volvo D-4 180 hp (134 kW) diesel engine

Hull appendages
- Keel: Fin keel with weighted bulb
- Ballast: 29,300 lb (13,290 kg)
- Rudder: Spade-type rudder

Rig
- Rig type: Bermuda rig
- I foretriangle height: 105.48 ft (32.15 m)
- J foretriangle base: 29.66 ft (9.04 m)
- P mainsail luff: 102.79 ft (31.33 m)
- E mainsail foot: 34.12 ft (10.40 m)

Sails
- Sailplan: Masthead sloop
- Mainsail area: 1,754 sq ft (163.0 m^{2})
- Jib/genoa area: 1,720 sq ft (160 m^{2})
- Spinnaker area: 5,631 sq ft (523.1 m^{2})
- Upwind sail area: 3,474 sq ft (322.7 m^{2})
- Downwind sail area: 7,385 sq ft (686.1 m^{2})

The Swan 82 is a Finnish sailboat that was designed by Germán Frers as a blue water cruiser-racer and first built in 2002. The Swan 82 S is the "raised salon" deck model of the design.

== Production ==
The design was built by Oy Nautor AB in Finland, from 2002 to 2012 with seven boats built, but it is now out of production.

== Design ==
The Swan 82 is a recreational keelboat, built predominantly of glassfibre, with wood trim. It has a masthead sloop rig, a raked stem, a reverse transom, an internally mounted spade-type rudder controlled by dual wheels and a fixed fin keel with weighted bulb. It displaces 90,400 lb (41,005 kg) and carries 29,300 lb (13,290 kg) of lead ballast.

The boat has a draft of 11.48 ft (3.50 m) with the standard keel.

The boat is fitted with a Swedish Volvo D-4 diesel engine of 180 hp (134 kW) or a Yanmar 4LH-STE diesel engine for docking and manoeuvring. The fuel tank holds 487 U.S. gallons (1,840 L; 406 imp gal) and the fresh water tank has a capacity of 237 U.S. gallons (900 L; 197 imp gal).

The design has sleeping accommodation for six people in three cabins, with two forward cabins each with two bunk beds, an L-shaped settee and a straight settee in the main cabin and an aft cabin with a central island double berth. The galley is located on the port side just aft of the companionway ladder. The galley is U-shaped and is equipped with a three-burner stove, an ice box and a double sink. A navigation station is opposite the galley, on the starboard side. There are three heads with showers, one for each cabin.

For sailing downwind the design may be equipped with an asymmetrical spinnaker of 5,631 sq ft (523.1 m^{2}). The design has a hull speed of 11.19 kn (20.72 km/h).

== See also ==
- List of sailing boat types
