= Nautor 50 =

Sailboat class

Development
- Designer: Sparkman & Stephens
- Location: Finland
- Year: 1976
- No. built: 9
- Builder: Oy Nautor AB
- Role: Motorsailer
- Name: Nautor 50

Boat
- Displacement: 50,926 lb (23,100 kg)
- Draft: 5.58 ft (1.70 m)

Hull
- Type: monohull
- Construction: glassfibre
- LOA: 49.70 ft (15.15 m)
- LWL: 37.50 ft (11.43 m)
- Beam: 15.09 ft (4.60 m)
- Engine: Perkins Engines 115 hp (86 kW) diesel engine

Hull appendages
- Keel: fin keel
- Ballast: 14,550 lb (6,600 kg)
- Rudder: Skeg-mounted rudder

Rig
- Rig type: Bermuda rig
- I foretriangle height: 59.00 ft (17.98 m)
- J foretriangle base: 19.91 ft (6.07 m)
- P mainsail luff: 51.25 ft (15.62 m)
- E mainsail foot: 14.50 ft (4.42 m)

Sails
- Sailplan: Masthead ketch
- Mainsail area: 371.56 sq ft (34.519 m^{2})
- Jib/genoa area: 587.35 sq ft (54.567 m^{2})
- Other sails: mizzen: 153.43 sq ft (14.254 m^{2})
- Total sail area: 1,112.00 sq ft (103.308 m^{2})

The Nautor 50, also called the Swan 50 MS, is a Finnish sailboat that was designed by Sparkman & Stephens as a motorsailer and first built in 1976.

== Production ==
The design was built by Oy Nautor AB in Finland, from 1976 to 1978, with nine boats completed.

When production ended the moulds were sold to Siltala Yachts. That company modified the design and sold it as the Nauticat 52.

== Design ==
The Nautor 50 is a recreational keelboat, built predominantly of glassfibre, with wood trim. It has a masthead ketch rig, a raked stem, an angled transom, a skeg-mounted rudder controlled by a wheel and a fixed fin keel. It displaces 50,926 lb (23,100 kg) and carries 14,926 lb (6,770 kg) of lead ballast.

The boat has a draft of 5.58 ft (1.70 m) with the standard keel.

The boat is fitted with a British Perkins Engines diesel engine of 115 hp (86 kW). The fuel tank holds 470 U.S. gallons (1,800 L; 390 imp gal) and the fresh water tank has a capacity of 523 U.S. gallons (1,980 L; 435 imp gal).

The design has sleeping accommodation for nine people, with a double "V"-berth in the bow cabin, two mid cabins, each with two bunk beds, an U-shaped settee in the main salon and two aft cabins, one with a double berth on the port side and one with a single bunk on the port side. The galley is located on the starboard side just forward of the companionway ladder. The galley is C-shaped and is equipped with a three-burner stove, an ice box and a double sink. There are two heads, one just aft of the bow cabin on the port side and one on the starboard side in the aft cabin.

The design has a hull speed of 8.21 kn (15.20 km/h).

== See also ==
- List of sailing boat types
