= Swan 391 =

Sailboat class

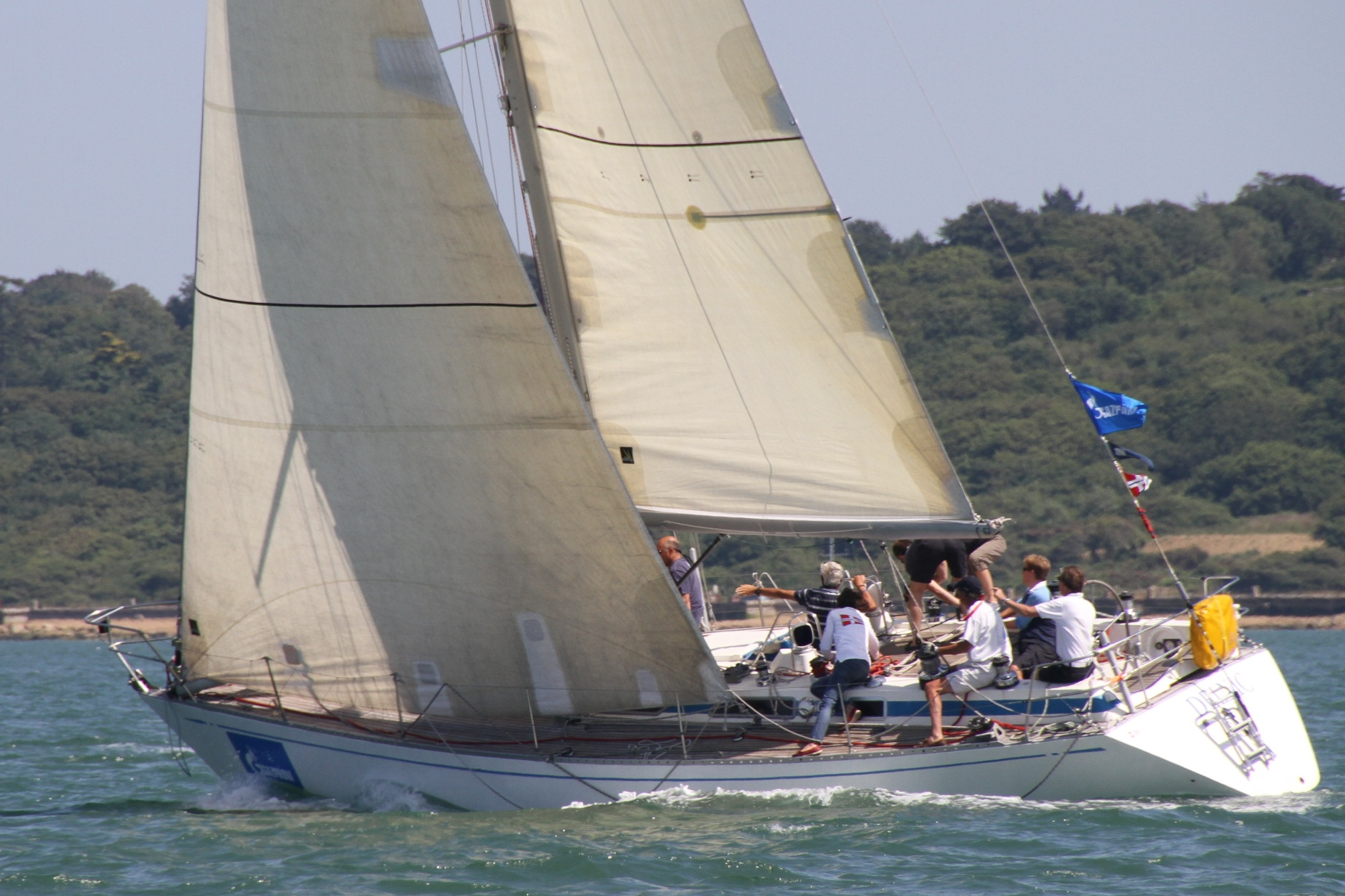

Development
- Designer: Ron Holland
- Location: Finland
- Year: 1981
- No. built: 52
- Builder: Oy Nautor AB
- Role: Cruiser-Racer
- Name: Swan 391

Boat
- Displacement: 18,900 lb (8,573 kg)
- Draft: 7.20 ft (2.19 m)

Hull
- Type: monohull
- Construction: glassfibre
- LOA: 39.92 ft (12.17 m)
- LWL: 33.08 ft (10.08 m)
- Beam: 12.42 ft (3.79 m)
- Engine: Perkins Engines diesel engine

Hull appendages
- Keel: fin keel
- Ballast: 6,800 lb (3,084 kg)
- Rudder: Spade-type rudder

Rig
- Rig type: Bermuda rig
- I foretriangle height: 53.50 ft (16.31 m)
- J foretriangle base: 16.30 ft (4.97 m)
- P mainsail luff: 47.30 ft (14.42 m)
- E mainsail foot: 14.00 ft (4.27 m)

Sails
- Sailplan: Masthead sloop
- Mainsail area: 331.10 sq ft (30.760 m^{2})
- Jib/genoa area: 436.03 sq ft (40.509 m^{2})
- Total sail area: 767.13 sq ft (71.269 m^{2})

Racing
- PHRF: 81-96

The Swan 391 is a Finnish sailboat that was designed by Ron Holland as a cruiser-racer and first built in 1981.

== Production ==
The design was built by Oy Nautor AB in Finland, from 1981 to 1987, with 52 boats built, but it is now out of production.

== Design ==
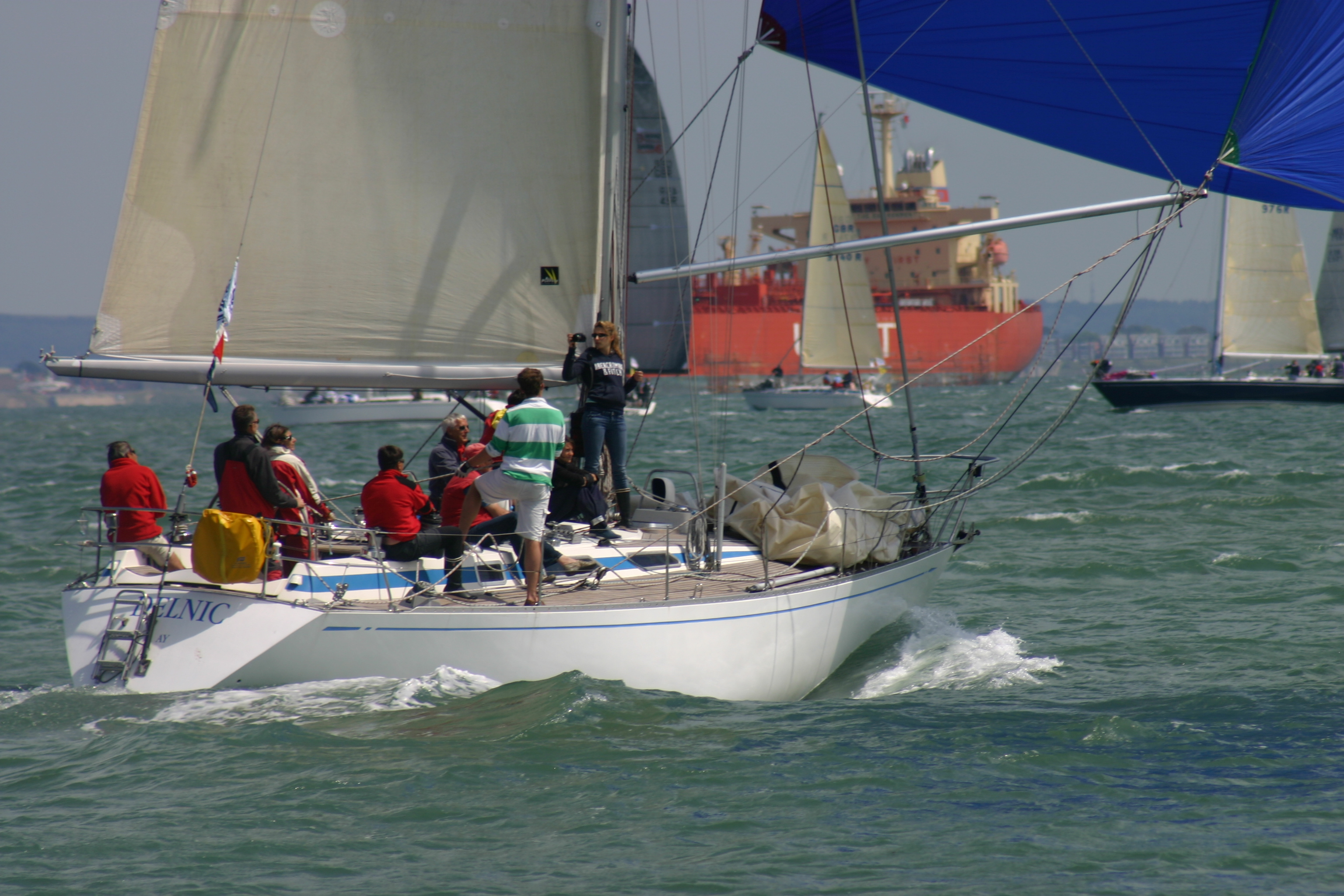
Swan 391 flying its spinnaker

The Swan 391 is a recreational keelboat, built predominantly of glassfibre, with wood trim. It has a masthead sloop rig, a raked stem, a reverse transom, an internally mounted spade-type rudder controlled by a wheel and a fixed fin keel or optional shoal-draft keel. It displaces 18,900 lb (8,573 kg) and carries 6,800 lb (3,084 kg) of ballast.

The boat has a draft of 7.20 ft (2.19 m) with the standard keel and 5.5 ft (1.7 m) with the optional shoal draft keel.

The boat is fitted with a British Perkins Engines diesel engine of for docking and manoeuvring.

The design has sleeping accommodation for nine people, with a double "V"-berth in the bow cabin, an L-shaped settee and a straight settee in the main cabin, plus two upper pilot berths and two aft cabins, one to port with a double berth and one to starboard with a single. The galley is located on the port side abeam the companionway ladder. The galley is L-shaped and is equipped with a three-burner stove, an ice box and a double sink. A navigation station is opposite the galley, on the starboard side. The head is located just aft of the bow cabin on the starboard side.

For sailing downwind the design may be equipped with a symmetrical spinnaker.

The design has a hull speed of 7.71 kn (14.28 km/h) and a PHRF handicap of 81 to 96 for the fin keel version and 102 for the shoal draft version.

== Operational history ==
Sailboat Lab describes the boat, "the Swan 391 is a moderate weight sailboat which is a reasonably good performer. It is stable / stiff and has a good righting capability if capsized. It is best suited as a coastal cruiser."

In the 1990 Rolex Swan Atlantic Regatta, a Swan 391, named Full Cry and sailed by Robert Compton, won the Rolex Swan Atlantic Challenge for overall points and also lowest corrected time with an IMS handicap.

== See also ==
- List of sailing boat types
