= Swan 601 =

Finnish sailboat class

Development
- Designer: Germán Frers
- Location: Finland
- Year: 2004
- No. built: 6
- Builder: Oy Nautor AB
- Role: Racer-Cruiser
- Name: Swan 601

Boat
- Displacement: 39,700 lb (18,008 kg)
- Draft: 12.00 ft (3.66 m)

Hull
- Type: monohull
- Construction: carbon fibre
- LOA: 60 ft (18 m)
- LWL: 52.92 ft (16.13 m)
- Beam: 14 ft 11 in (4.55 m)
- Engine: Yanmar 100 hp (75 kW) turbocharged diesel engine

Hull appendages
- Keel: Fin keel
- Ballast: 18,700 lb (8,482 kg)
- Rudder: Spade-type rudder

Rig
- Rig type: Bermuda rig
- I foretriangle height: 81.74 ft (24.91 m)
- J foretriangle base: 22.29 ft (6.79 m)
- P mainsail luff: 80.05 ft (24.40 m)
- E mainsail foot: 28.38 ft (8.65 m)

Sails
- Sailplan: Fractional rigged sloop
- Mainsail area: 1,343 sq ft (124.8 m^{2})
- Jib/genoa area: 1,037 sq ft (96.3 m^{2})
- Spinnaker area: 3,427 sq ft (318.4 m^{2})
- Upwind sail area: 2,380 sq ft (221 m^{2})
- Downwind sail area: 4,770 sq ft (443 m^{2})

Racing
- PHRF: -72

The Swan 601 is a Finnish sailboat that was designed by Germán Frers as a one-design racer-cruiser and first built in 2004.

The design was a follow-on to the Swan 45's success as a one-design and an attempt to create a one-design racing class for bigger boats. The design was not a success commercially and the one-design races never had enough boats entered to keep it going as a class. Writer Louay Habib noted, "there were too many compromises in the design to keep either cruisers or racers happy. It turned out to be neither competitive in handicap racing nor fun to cruise, and very few were sold."

== Production ==
The design was built by Oy Nautor AB in Finland, starting in 2004, with six boats sold by 2005, but it is now out of production.

== Design ==
The Swan 601 is a racing keelboat, built predominantly of resin-infused carbon fibre covered with gelcoat, with wood trim and a teak-faced deck. It has a fractional sloop rig, with two sets of swept spreaders. The hull has a nearly-plumb stem, a reverse transom with a drop-down tailgate swimming platform, an internally mounted spade-type rudder controlled by dual wheels and a fixed fin keel. It displaces 39,700 lb (18,008 kg) empty and carries 18,700 lb (8,482 kg) of ballast. Two deck arrangements were available, one with a nearly flush deck and the other with a bridgedeck.

The boat has a draft of 11.81 ft (3.60 m) with the standard keel.

The boat is fitted with a Japanese Yanmar turbocharged diesel engine of 100 hp (75 kW), with a three-bladed low drag propeller for docking and manoeuvring. The fuel tank holds 68 U.S. gallons (260 L; 57 imp gal) and the fresh water tank has a capacity of 100 U.S. gallons (380 L; 83 imp gal).

The design has accommodation includes a double berth in the bow cabin and two heads with a third head optional with the bridgedeck-equipped deck.

For sailing downwind the design may be equipped with a symmetrical spinnaker of 3,427 sq ft (318.4 m^{2}).

The design has a PHRF handicap of -72.

== Operational history ==
Peter Ogden's Swan 601, Spirit of Jethou competed in the 2005 Antigua Sailing Week. The boat was modified with a new keel and rudders. On the first day the boat came in third place.

The Italian-owned Swan 601 Cuor di Leone, along with Spirit of Jethou, competed in the 2005 Rolex Swan European Regatta in the Group A yacht category.

The Swan 601 Moneypenny participated in the 2006 Rolex Swan American Regatta, winning the first day. The boat went on to win five of the eight races and the Class A title. The boat was campaigned in European and North American events in 2006 and 2007.

In a 2005 review for Sail Magazine, Tim Jeffrey wrote, "after spending a day as part of her racing crew, I could find nothing menacing on board. That's because this German Frers–designed Swan 601 is just too sweet of line, too shapely in a lean sort of way, to be anything other than very elegant. She's more a rapier than a broadsword, I would say. The yacht is the second model of Nautor's more overtly race-oriented one-design classes and follows the similarly tautly styled and surfaced Swan 45."

== See also ==
- List of sailing boat types
