= Swan 36-2 =

Sailboat class

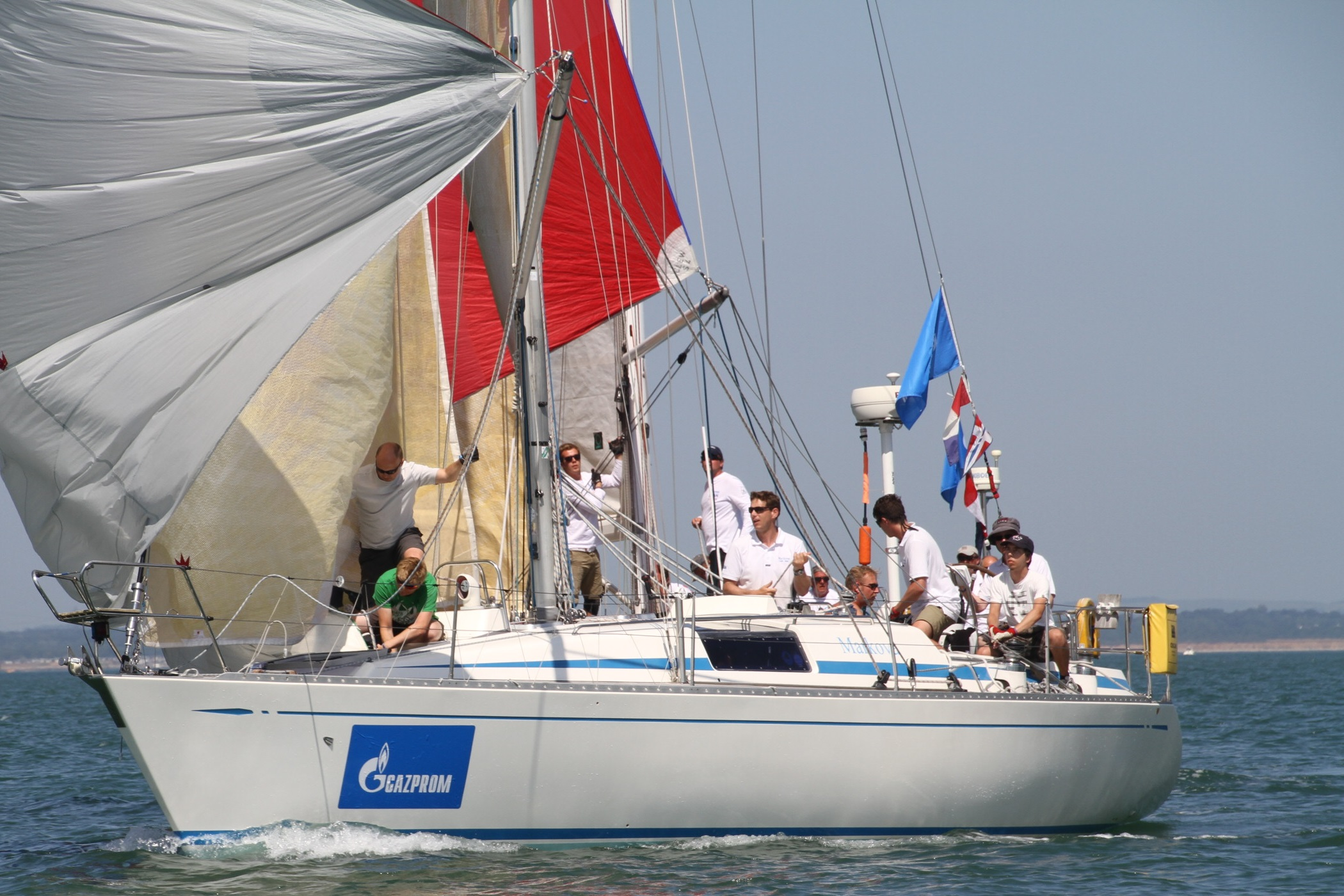

Development
- Designer: Germán Frers; Andrew Winch
- Location: Finland
- Year: 1988
- No. built: 55
- Builder: Oy Nautor AB
- Role: Cruiser
- Name: Swan 36-2

Boat
- Displacement: 14,770 lb (6,700 kg)
- Draft: 6.92 ft (2.11 m)

Hull
- Type: monohull
- Construction: glassfibre
- LOA: 36.61 ft (11.16 m)
- LWL: 29.72 ft (9.06 m)
- Beam: 11.97 ft (3.65 m)
- Engine: Volvo Penta 2003R 28 hp (21 kW) diesel engine

Hull appendages
- Keel: fin keel
- Ballast: 5,600 lb (2,540 kg)
- Rudder: Spade-type rudder

Rig
- Rig type: Bermuda rig
- I foretriangle height: 47.74 ft (14.55 m)
- J foretriangle base: 14.11 ft (4.30 m)
- P mainsail luff: 41.57 ft (12.67 m)
- E mainsail foot: 13.78 ft (4.20 m)

Sails
- Sailplan: Masthead sloop
- Mainsail area: 287.11 sq ft (26.673 m^{2})
- Jib/genoa area: 336.81 sq ft (31.291 m^{2})
- Total sail area: 623.92 sq ft (57.964 m^{2})

Racing
- PHRF: 114-132

The Swan 36-2 is a Finnish sailboat that was designed by Germán Frers and Andrew Winch as a coastal cruiser and first built in 1988.

The design was originally marketed by the manufacturer as the Swan 36, but is now usually referred to as the Swan 36-2 to differentiate it from the unrelated 1967 Sparkman & Stephens Swan 36 design.

== Production ==
The design was built by Oy Nautor AB in Finland, from 1988 until 1996, with 55 boats completed, but it is now out of production.

== Design ==
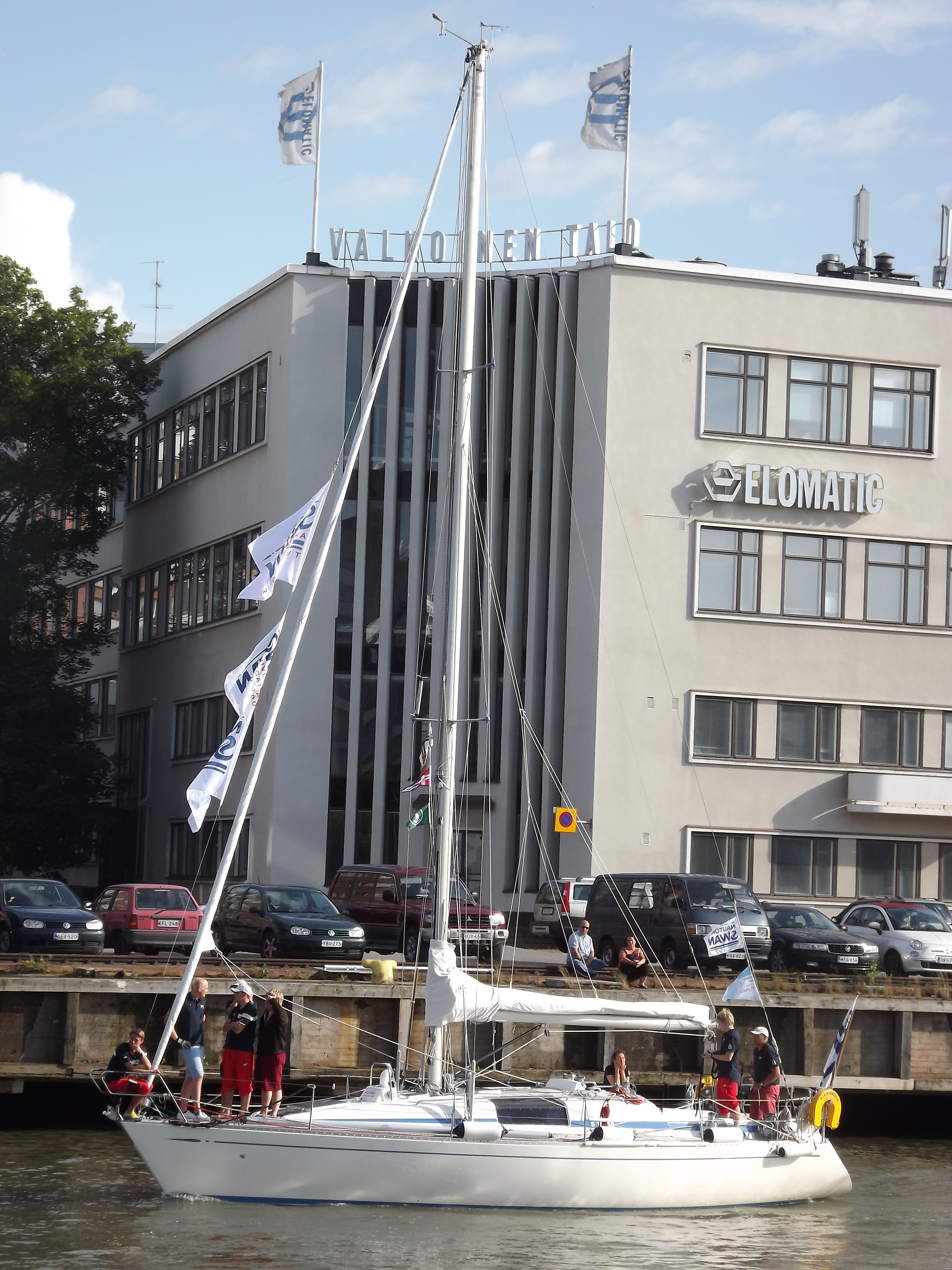
Swan 36-2

The Swan 36-2 is a recreational keelboat, built predominantly of glassfibre, with wood trim. It has a masthead sloop rig, a raked stem, a reverse transom, an internally mounted spade-type rudder controlled by a wheel and a fixed fin keel. It displaces 14,770 lb (6,700 kg) and carries 5,600 lb (2,540 kg) of lead ballast.

The boat has a draft of 6.92 ft (2.11 m) with the standard keel.

The boat is fitted with a Swedish Volvo Penta 2003R diesel engine of 28 hp (21 kW) for docking and manoeuvring. The fuel tank holds 32 U.S. gallons (120 L; 27 imp gal) and the fresh water tank has a capacity of 63 U.S. gallons (240 L; 52 imp gal).

The design has sleeping accommodation for four people, with a double "V"-berth in the bow cabin, two straight settees in the main cabin and an aft cabin with a double "V" berth on the starboard side. The galley is located on the port side just forward of the companionway ladder. The galley is L-shaped and is equipped with a three-burner stove, an ice box and a double sink. A navigation station is opposite the galley, on the starboard side. The head is located just aft of the bow cabin on the port side.

For sailing downwind the design may be equipped with a symmetrical spinnaker.

The design has a hull speed of 7.31 kn (13.54 km/h) and a PHRF handicap of 114 to 132.

== Operational history ==
In a 2000 design review, Robert Perry wrote, "when you look at the sail plan you should notice the subtle interplay between sheerline, cove stripe and the double bootstripe. I would guess that Frers has drawn the bootstripe at least eight inches above the DWL. This all works together to accentuate and lower the freeboard. The sheer spring is subtle and beautiful. Few designers have as good an eye for a sheer as does Frers. The cabintrunk is interesting in that it fairs to a knuckle forward of the mast. This maximizes interior volume and headroom while keeping deck space."

== See also ==
- List of sailing boat types
