= Nautor 105 =

Swan / Nautor 105
Development
- Designer: Ron Holland
- Location: Finland
- Year: 1986
- No. built: 1
- Brand: Nautor
- Builder: Nautor Swan OY
- Role: Cruising
- Name: Swan / Nautor 105

Boat
- Displacement: 113,000 kg (249,000 lb)
- Draft: 4.02 m (13.2 ft)

Hull
- Type: Monohull
- LOH: 31.09 m (102.0 ft)
- LWL: 25.10 m (82.3 ft)
- Beam: 7.74 m (25.4 ft)
- Engine: Mercedes 550hp

Hull appendages
- Rudder: Skeg hung spade

Rig
- Rig type: Masthead
- I foretriangle height: 35.20 m (115.5 ft)
- J foretriangle base: 12.50 m (41.0 ft)
- P mainsail luff: 32.00 m (104.99 ft)
- E mainsail foot: 10.80 m (35.4 ft)

Sails
- Sailplan: Cutter
- Mainsail area: 172.8 m^{2} (1,860 sq ft)
- Jib/genoa area: 330 m^{2} (3,600 sq ft)
- Luff perpendicular: 150%
- Spinnaker area: 792 m^{2} (8,530 sq ft)

The Garuda was a custom one off world cruising yacht designed by Ron Holland and built by Nautor's Swan and first launched in 1986.
