= Swan 411 =

Sailboat class

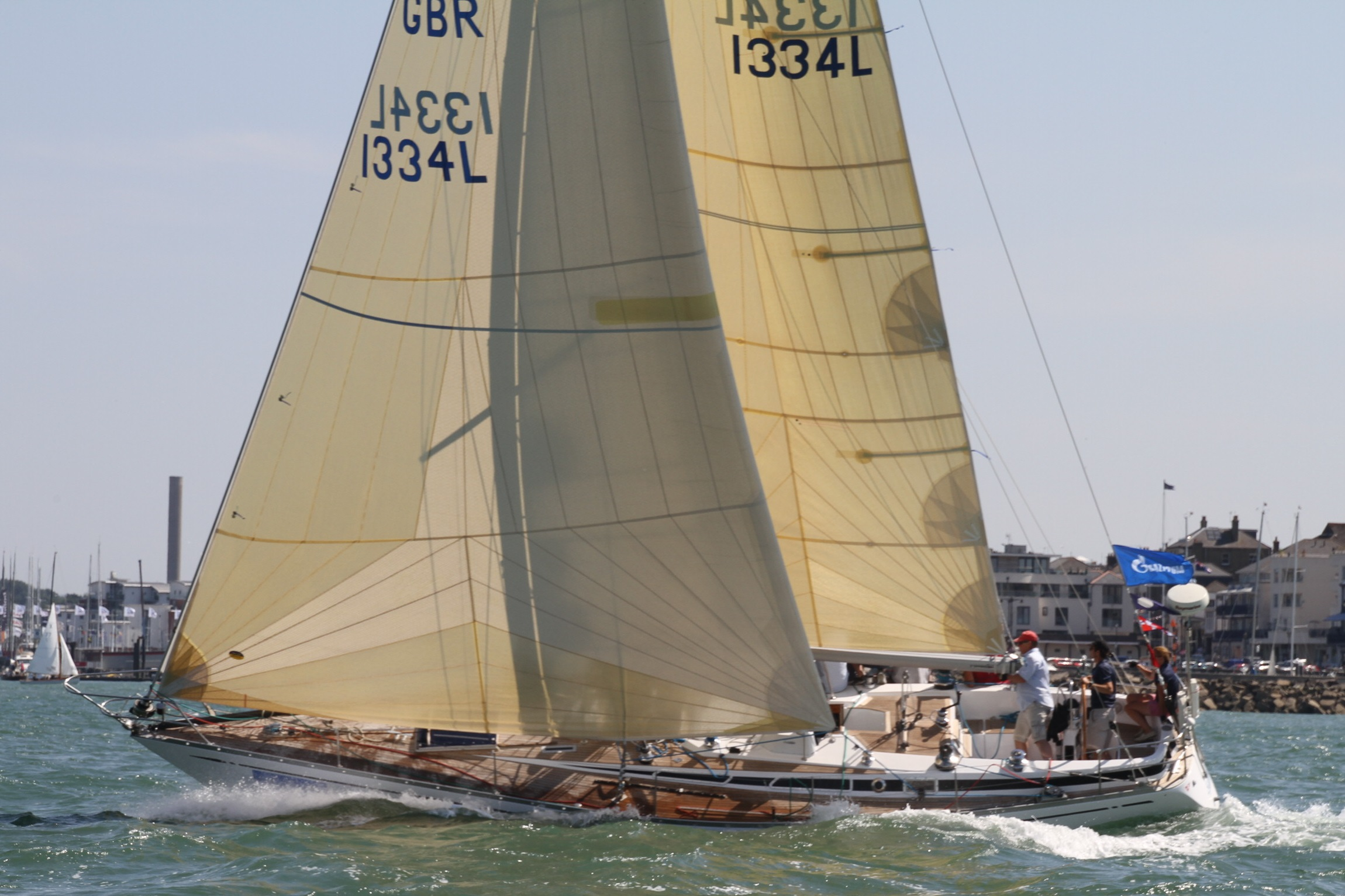

Development
- Designer: Sparkman & Stephens
- Location: Finland
- Year: 1977
- No. built: 42
- Builder: Oy Nautor AB
- Role: Cruiser-Racer
- Name: Swan 411

Boat
- Displacement: 23,800 lb (10,795 kg)
- Draft: 7.50 ft (2.29 m)

Hull
- Type: monohull
- Construction: glassfibre
- LOA: 40.81 ft (12.44 m)
- LWL: 33.56 ft (10.23 m)
- Beam: 11.94 ft (3.64 m)
- Engine: Perkins Engines 4-108M 47 hp (35 kW) diesel engine

Hull appendages
- Keel: fin keel
- Ballast: 9,700 lb (4,400 kg)
- Rudder: Skeg-mounted rudder

Rig
- Rig type: Bermuda rig
- I foretriangle height: 57.50 ft (17.53 m)
- J foretriangle base: 18.00 ft (5.49 m)
- P mainsail luff: 51.50 ft (15.70 m)
- E mainsail foot: 13.80 ft (4.21 m)

Sails
- Sailplan: Masthead sloop
- Mainsail area: 355 sq ft (33.0 m^{2})
- Jib/genoa area: 776 sq ft (72.1 m^{2})
- Spinnaker area: 1,862 sq ft (173.0 m^{2})
- Upwind sail area: 1,131 sq ft (105.1 m^{2})
- Downwind sail area: 2,217 sq ft (206.0 m^{2})

Racing
- PHRF: 66-93

The Swan 411 is a Finnish sailboat that was designed by Sparkman & Stephens as an offshore cruiser-racer and first built in 1977.

== Production ==
The design was built by Oy Nautor AB in Finland, from 1977 to 1979 with 42 boats completed, but it is now out of production.

== Design ==
The Swan 411 is a recreational keelboat, built predominantly of polyester glassfibre, with wood trim. The hull is of solid glassfibre, while the deck is of sandwich construction. It has a masthead sloop rig, with a keel-stepped mast, two sets of spreaders and aluminum spars with discontinuous stainless steel rod rigging. The hull has a raked stem, a reverse transom, a skeg-mounted rudder controlled by a wheel and a fixed fin keel. It displaces 23,800 lb (10,795 kg) and carries 9,700 lb (4,400 kg) of lead ballast.

The boat has a draft of 7.50 ft (2.29 m) with the standard keel on the first 19 boats produced and 8.00 ft (2.44 m) on boats from 20 to 42.

The boat is fitted with a British 4-108M diesel engine of 47 hp (35 kW) for docking and manoeuvring. The fuel tank holds 34 U.S. gallons (130 L; 28 imp gal) and the fresh water tank has a capacity of 66 U.S. gallons (250 L; 55 imp gal).

The design has sleeping accommodation for eight people, with a double "V"-berth in the bow cabin, two straight settee berths and two pilot berths in the main cabin and two aft cabins, the starboard with a single berth and the port with a double. The galley is located on the port side just forward of the companionway ladder. The galley is L-shaped and is equipped with a three-burner stove, an ice box and a sink. A navigation station is opposite the galley, on the starboard side. The head is located just aft of the bow cabin on the starboard side.

For sailing downwind the design may be equipped with a symmetrical spinnaker of 1,862 sq ft (173.0 m^{2}).

The design has a hull speed of 7.76 kn (14.37 km/h) and a PHRF handicap of 66 to 93.

== Operational history ==
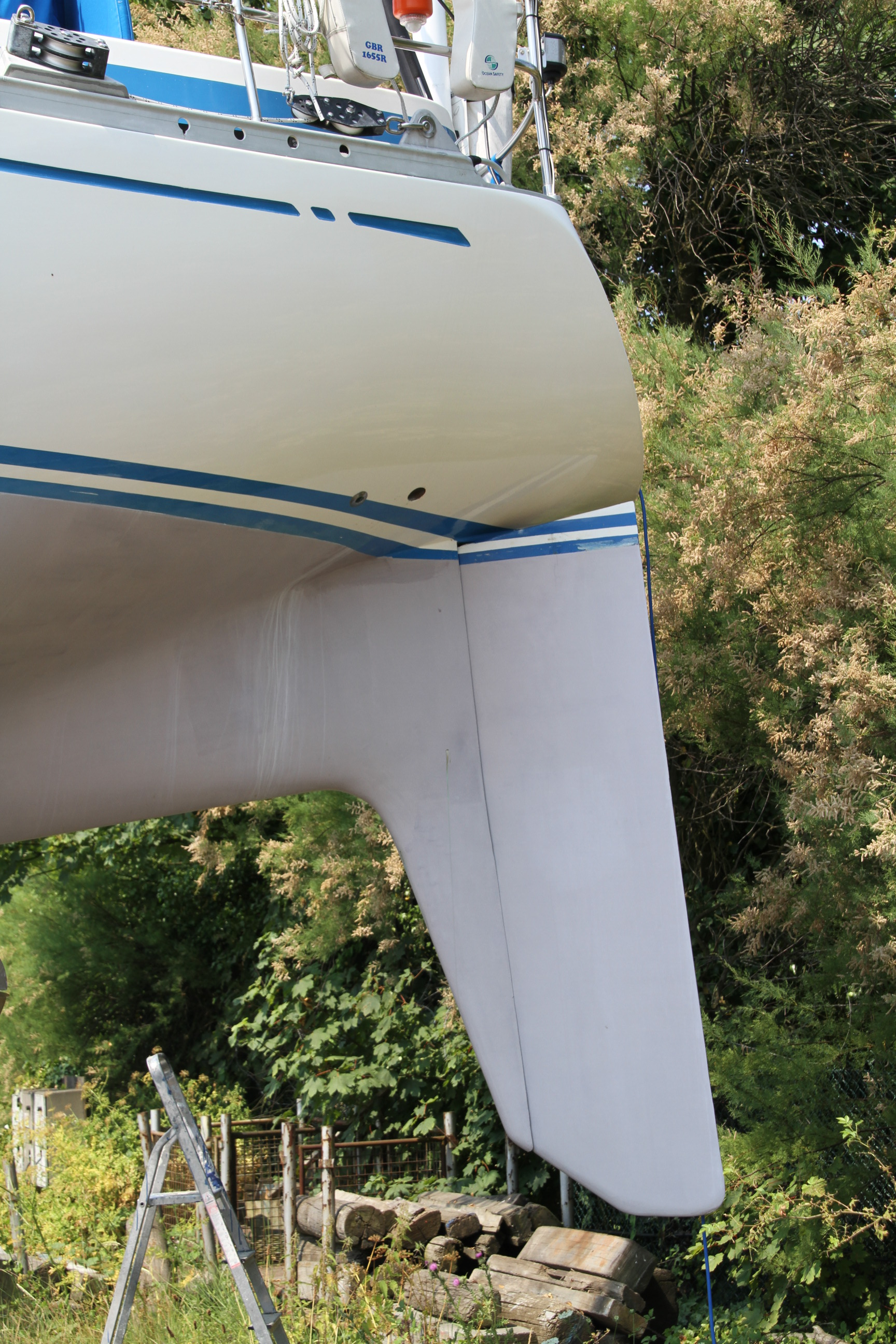
Swan 411 Skeg Rudder

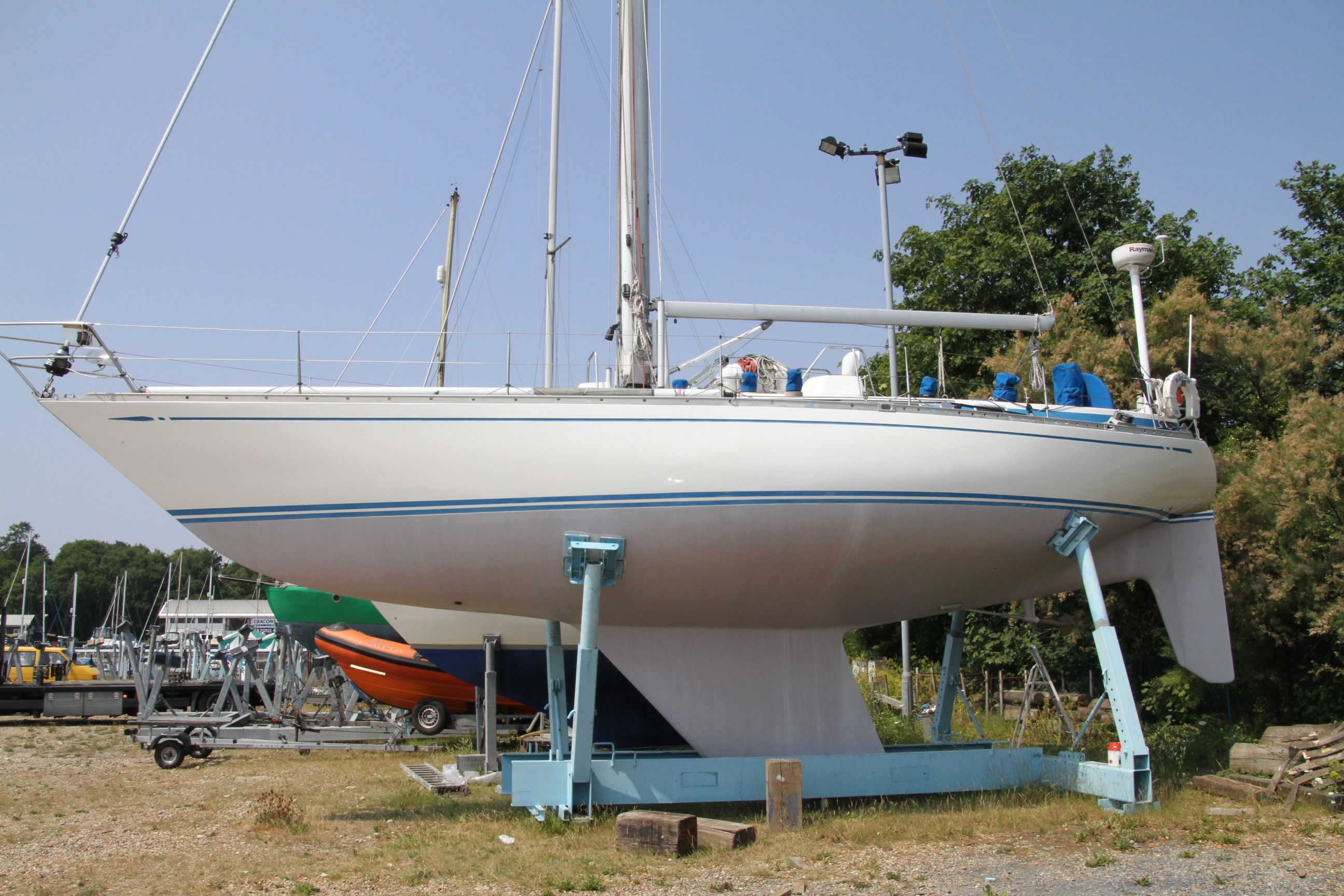
Swan 411 on its cradle

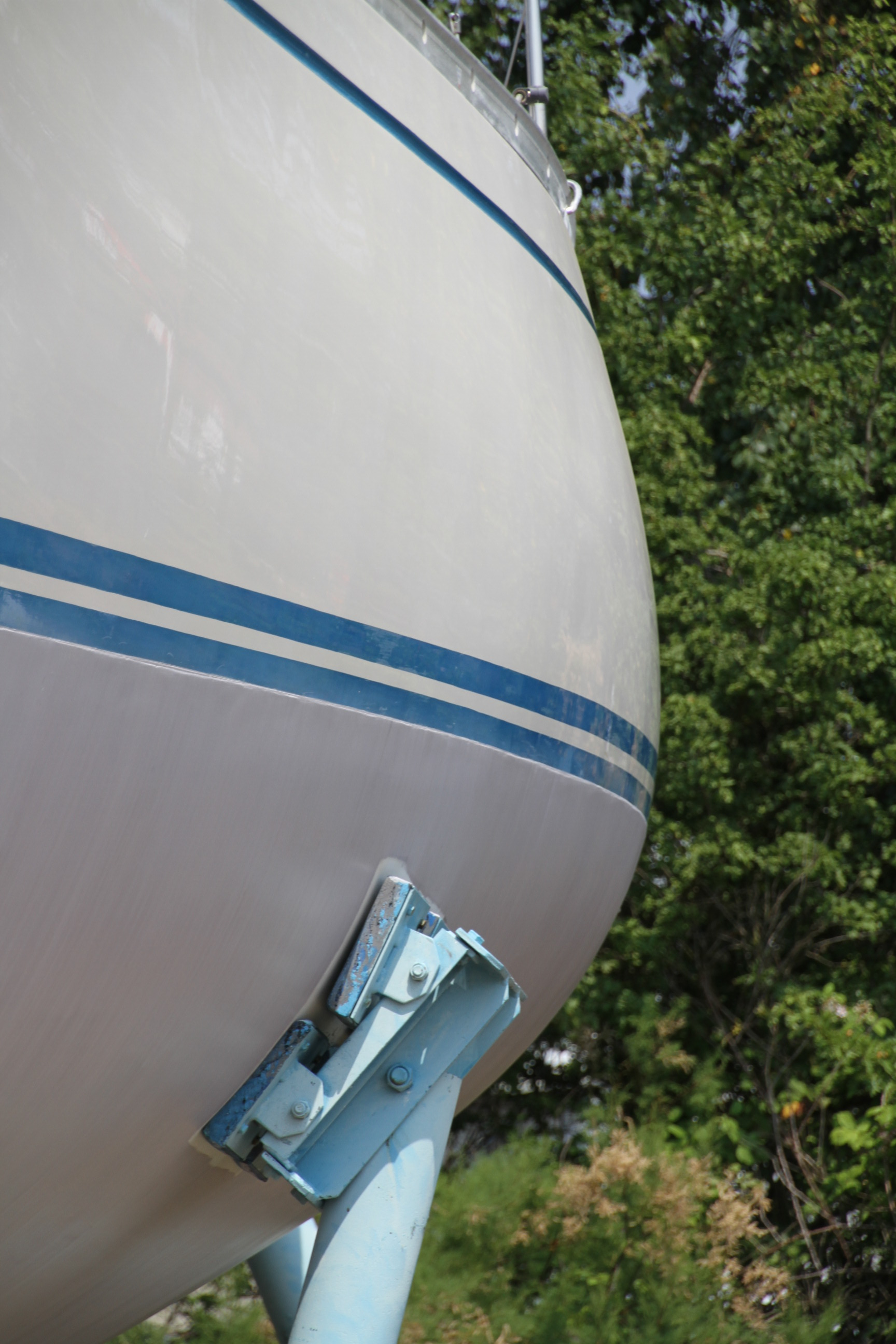
Swan 411 Hull Tumblehome

In a 2013 review for Yachting Monthly, Dick Durham wrote, "Her draught rules her out as a creek crawler, but for pure sailing pleasure, peerless sea-keeping and sheer beauty, very few other boats can hold a candle to this all-time classic. She's a fine, fast passage-maker that revels in a good blow and offers her crew a comfortable motion at sea, yet she has the manoeuvrability that most comparable yachts lack, performs well in light airs too, and can sail closer to the wind than most modern cruisers. The genoa is a beast but the staysail is manageable and you'll rarely need to use the runners, so short-tacking won’t be a chore."

== See also ==
- List of sailing boat types
