= Swan 431 =

Finnish sailboat class

Development
- Designer: Sparkman & Stephens
- Location: Finland
- Year: 1976
- No. built: 32
- Builder: Oy Nautor AB
- Role: Cruiser-Racer
- Name: Swan 431

Boat
- Displacement: 26,500 lb (12,020 kg)
- Draft: 7.40 ft (2.26 m)

Hull
- Type: monohull
- Construction: glassfibre
- LOA: 43.25 ft (13.18 m)
- LWL: 33.33 ft (10.16 m)
- Beam: 13.41 ft (4.09 m)
- Engine: Perkins Engines 4-108M 37 hp (28 kW) diesel engine

Hull appendages
- Keel: swept fin keel
- Ballast: 11,900 lb (5,398 kg)
- Rudder: Skeg-mounted rudder

Rig
- Rig type: Bermuda rig
- I foretriangle height: 59.00 ft (17.98 m)
- J foretriangle base: 17.92 ft (5.46 m)
- P mainsail luff: 53.25 ft (16.23 m)
- E mainsail foot: 13.75 ft (4.19 m)

Sails
- Sailplan: Masthead sloop
- Mainsail area: 366.09 sq ft (34.011 m^{2})
- Jib/genoa area: 529.53 sq ft (49.195 m^{2})
- Total sail area: 895.62 sq ft (83.206 m^{2})

Racing
- PHRF: 84-93

The Swan 431 is a Finnish sailboat that was designed by Sparkman & Stephens cruiser-racer and first built in 1976. The boat is Sparkman & Stephens' design #2238-C1.

== Production ==
The design was built by Oy Nautor AB in Finland, from 1976 to 1978 with 32 boats completed, but it is now out of production.

== Design ==
The Swan 431 is a recreational keelboat, built predominantly of glassfibre, with wood trim. It has a masthead sloop rig, a raked stem, a reverse transom, a skeg-mounted rudder controlled by a wheel and a fixed swept fin keel. It displaces 26,500 lb (12,020 kg) and carries 11,900 lb (5,398 kg) of ballast.

The boat has a draft of 7.40 ft (2.26 m) with the standard keel.

The boat is fitted with a British Perkins Engines 4-108M diesel engine of 37 hp (28 kW) for docking and manoeuvring. The fuel tank holds 40 U.S. gallons (150 L; 33 imp gal) and the fresh water tank has a capacity of 100 U.S. gallons (380 L; 83 imp gal).

The design has sleeping accommodation for nine people, with a double "V"-berth in the bow cabin, two straight settee berths and two pilot berths in the main cabin and two aft cabins with a double berth in the starboard cabin and a single berth in the port cabin. The galley is located on the port side just abeam of the companionway ladder. The galley is of straight configuration and is equipped with a three-burner stove, an ice box and a sink. A navigation station is opposite the galley, on the starboard side. There are two heads, one just aft of the bow cabin on the port side and one on the starboard side aft.

The design has a hull speed of 7.74 kn (14.33 km/h) and a PHRF handicap of 84 to 93.

== See also ==
- List of sailing boat types
