= Nautor 39 =

Sailboat class

Development
- Designer: Sparkman & Stephens
- Location: Finland
- Year: 1977
- No. built: 4
- Builder: Oy Nautor AB
- Role: Motorsailer
- Name: Nautor 39

Boat
- Displacement: 28,660 lb (13,000 kg)
- Draft: 5.58 ft (1.70 m)

Hull
- Type: monohull
- Construction: glassfibre
- LOA: 39.21 ft (11.95 m)
- LWL: 31.00 ft (9.45 m)
- Beam: 13.16 ft (4.01 m)
- Engine: Perkins Engines 73 hp (54 kW) diesel engine

Hull appendages
- Keel: fin keel
- Ballast: 9,039 lb (4,100 kg)
- Rudder: Skeg-mounted rudder

Rig
- Rig type: Ketch
- I foretriangle height: 50.98 ft (15.54 m)
- J foretriangle base: 14.99 ft (4.57 m)
- P mainsail luff: 43.24 ft (13.18 m)
- E mainsail foot: 12.76 ft (3.89 m)

Sails
- Sailplan: Masthead ketch
- Mainsail area: 275.87 sq ft (25.629 m^{2})
- Jib/genoa area: 382.10 sq ft (35.498 m^{2})
- Other sails: mizzen: 135.05 sq ft (12.547 m^{2})
- Total sail area: 793.00 sq ft (73.672 m^{2})

The Nautor 39 is a Finnish sailboat that was designed by Sparkman & Stephens as a motorsailer and first built in 1977.

== Production ==
The design was built by Oy Nautor AB in Finland, from 1977 to 1979 with four boats completed, but it is now out of production.

== Design ==
The Nautor 39 is a recreational keelboat, built predominantly of glassfibre, with wood trim. It has a masthead ketch rig, a raked stem, an angled transom, a skeg-mounted rudder controlled by two wheels and a fixed fin keel. One wheel is on the port side of wheelhouse and one inside on the port side. The boat displaces 28,660 lb (13,000 kg) and carries 9,039 lb (4,100 kg) of lead ballast.

The boat has a draft of 5.58 ft (1.70 m) with the standard keel.

The boat is fitted with a British Perkins Engines diesel engine of 73 hp (54 kW). The fuel tank holds 243 U.S. gallons (920 L; 202 imp gal) and the fresh water tank has a capacity of 297 U.S. gallons (1,120 L; 247 imp gal).

The design has sleeping accommodation for five people, with a double "V"-berth in the bow cabin, an L-shaped settee in the main salon under a raised wheelhouse and two aft cabins, one with a double berth on the port side and one with a single berth on the starboard. The galley is located on the port side just forward of the main salon. The galley is equipped with a three-burner stove, an ice box and a double sink. A navigation and wheel station is in the main salon, on the port side. There are two heads, one just aft of the bow cabin on the starboard side and one on the port side, forward of the aft cabins.

The design has a hull speed of 7.46 kn (13.82 km/h).

== Operational history ==
Austrian orchestra conductor Herbert von Karajan was a great sailing enthusiast and at one time owned and sailed a Nautor 39.

== See also ==
- List of sailing boat types
