= Nautor Swan =

Finnish sailboat building company

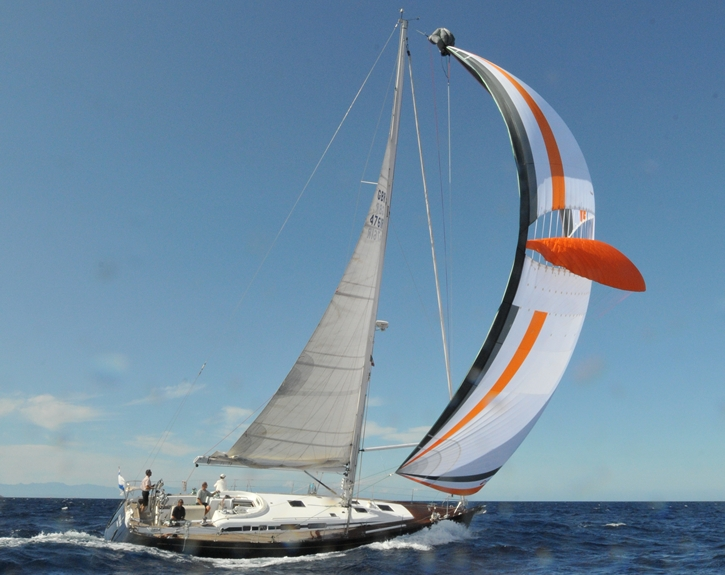
A Swan 53 Mk II (2004–2015) at the Swan Cup 2008

Oy Nautor Ab is a Finnish producer of luxury sailing yachts, based in Jakobstad. It is known for its Nautor's Swan range of yachts models. The company was founded in 1966 by Pekka Koskenkylä.

== The designers ==
Nautor has worked with four naval architects for its production sailing yachts. Nautor's custom division have also built Luca Brenta and Bill Tripp designs. Powerboats have been designed by Don Shead and Jakko Jamson.

=== 1960s to 1970s - Sparkman & Stephens ===
The original designer Sparkman & Stephens had a long association with Nautor and were responsible for the first 775 yachts sold. These early designs combined a luxurious interior in a fiberglass hull with features that were then current in successful racing boats, such as the separation of the skeg-hung rudder from the keel. They won numerous races including Cowes Week in 1968, the Bermuda Race in 1972 by a Swan 48 ('Noryema VIII', the first non-USA yacht and the first production yacht ever to win that race), followed by even bigger success in 1974, when a ketch rigged Swan 65 by the name Sayula II won the first ever Whitbread Round the World Race. In 2016, this adventure was presented in a documentary film, The Weekend Sailor.

=== 1970s to 1980s - Ron Holland ===
During the mid to late 1970s the designs from Sparkman & Stephens were not as successful on the race course. Ron Holland started his tenure as designer for Nautor's Swan in the late 1970s, creating six models of which 283 yachts were sold.

=== 1980s to Present - Frers Design ===
In the 1980s, Nautor's Swan entered a new era with the appointment of Argentinian Germán Frers as designer. Over 900 yachts have been produced so far. The yard has continued to stay with Frers, and the hull designs have continued to follow modern trends. However the Frers designs have moved away from its production cruiser/racer background into luxury high end larger cruising yachts.

=== 2010s to Present - Juan Kouyoumdjian ===
To mark a return to selling racer-cruiser sailboats and the company's 50th Anniversary, a design competition led to Nautor working with Juan Kouyoumdjian to create the ClubSwan 50.

=== Styling ===
Additional architects have collaborated with Frers in terms of styling. Most notably Andrew Winch on the styling of the Swan 36 Frers and Swan 44 Mk I. Beiderbeck Design came up with the overall concept and interior for the Swan 105 which at this size is almost semi custom.

== Ownership ==
In late 1969 the assembly hall of the Nautor's Swan boat yard burnt to the ground, destroying a dozen hulls in various stages of production. As a result, Pekka Koskenkylä was forced to sell stakes of Nautor's Swan to Wilhelm Schauman Oy (UPM) in order to finance the rebuilding of the yard and to restart production.

From 1998 on, Italian businessman Leonardo Ferragamo and a group of investors have controlled and managed Nautor's Swan, continuing to push forward innovations and changes intended to place Swan yachts at the forefront of the international sailing world.

== The Nautor yard ==
Since the foundation of the company in 1966, a little over 2,000 Swan yachts have been produced, ranging from 36 to 131 feet in length. The firm employs about 400 staff, and an almost similar number of indirect staff.

The historical plant in Kållby, just outside Jakobstad, is dedicated to plug and mould fabrication and the lamination of all Swans' hulls, using an advanced and fully computerized milling machine to shape the moulds. Another part of the plant is dedicated to the assembly of the smaller size yachts. The Kållby plant also includes an in-door water facility to test the yachts prior to delivery.

In 2002, a new yard, close to the sea, has been opened in Jakobstad. The new yard is dedicated to the assembly of "Maxi" Swan Yachts, from the Swan 60 to the Swan 115.

The third plant is in Kronoby, close to Jakobstad, and it is here that expert carpenters work, dedicated to the hand-made preparation of the wood interiors, which have become a feature of all Swan yachts. A sample of the wood of each yacht is kept at the factory so that an exact replacement could be made if required.

In August 2012, a Swan 90S named Freya was the 2000th Swan to be built and launched by the yard.

== Club Swan ==
Club Swan is a non-profit organization whose members are present, past and future Swan yacht owners. The club house is located at the Segelsällskapet Yacht Club in Jakobstad, Finland. Leonardo Ferragamo is the chairman of the club. Among the honorary members are the former King Juan Carlos I of Spain, Pekka Koskenkylä, German Frers, Ron Holland and Lady Pippa Blake, wife of deceased Peter Blake.

The highlight of the racing calendar for Swan owners is the biennial "Rolex Swan Cup", held in Porto Cervo, Sardinia in association with the Yacht Club Costa Smeralda, which traditionally embodies "The Spirit of Swan" in its glamour and quality of sailing. Since 2013, a "Rolex Swan Cup Caribbean" regatta has been held at the Yacht Club Costa Smeralda's clubhouse in the British Virgin Islands. This event at Virgin Gorda is held on alternate years to the Mediterranean one. Two other well known biennial events have been the "Swan European Regatta", usually taking place in the waters of Cowes in association with the Royal Yacht Squadron; and the "Swan American Regatta" taking place in the waters of Newport Rhode Island, in association with the New York Yacht Club.

In 2017, The Nations Trophy was launched as a biennial event to promote Swan one design racing between nations. The regatta is open to ClubSwan 50s, Swan 45s and ClubSwan 42s. Various European and World Championships, between the individual one design classes, have also been incorporated into this competition.

The ClubSwan is a brand based yacht club that also organises and runs a series of annual cruising rendezvous and regattas. Together with helping promote develop the ClubSwan 36 and ClubSwan 50 and previously the ClubSwan 42, Swan 45, Swan 60 FD, Swan 601 and the "Swan Maxi Class".

== Models ==
=== Nautor Swan - Productions Yachts ===
Swan production yacht models are listed below:

Model	Version	Years	Designer	Built	Ref.
Swan 36		1967–1970	Sparkman & Stephens	90	
Swan 36 Frers		1988–1996	Germán Frers	55	
Swan 37		1970–1974	Sparkman & Stephens	59	
Swan 371		1979–1986	Ron Holland	87	
Swan 38		1974–1979	Sparkman & Stephens	116	
Swan 39	Racing	1978–1979	Ron Holland	12	
Swan 39	Cruising	1978–1980	Ron Holland	21	
Swan 391		1981–1987	Ron Holland	52	
Swan 40		1970–1972	Sparkman & Stephens	51	
Swan 40 Frers		1992–2001	Germán Frers	58	
Swan 41		1973–1977	Sparkman & Stephens	61	
Swan 411		1977–1979	Sparkman & Stephens	42	
Swan 42		1980–1985	Ron Holland	38	
Swan 43		1969–1972	Sparkman & Stephens	67	
Swan 431		1976	Sparkman & Stephens	32	
**ClubSwan 43**		**2024–Present**	**Juan Kouyoumdjian**	**8+**	
Swan 43 Holland		1985–1990	Ron Holland	28	
Swan 44		1972–1975	Sparkman & Stephens	76	
Swan 441	Racing	1978–1979	Ron Holland	5	
Swan 441	Cruising	1979–1982	Ron Holland	40	
Swan 44 Frers	Mk I	1989–1994	Germán Frers	19	
Swan 44 Frers	Mk II	1996–2002	Germán Frers	50	
Swan 45 OD		2002–2010	Germán Frers	50	
Swan 46	Mk I	1983–1989	Germán Frers	109	
Swan 46	Mk II	1989–1997	Germán Frers	28	
Swan 46 Mk III		2004–2007	Germán Frers	25	
Swan 47		1975–1984	Sparkman & Stephens	70	
Swan 47-2		1976–1984	Sparkman & Stephens	10	
Swan 48		1971–1975	Sparkman & Stephens	46	
Swan 48 Frers		1995–2003	Germán Frers	57	
Swan 48-3 Frers	V3 Mk.1	2019–2024	Germán Frers	60+	
Swan 48-3 Frers	V3 Mk.2	2024–2026	Germán Frers	60+	
**ClubSwan 50**		**2015–**	**Juan Kouyoumdjian**	28	
Swan 51		1981–1985	Germán Frers	36	
**Swan 51 Mk2**		**2024-Onwards**	**Germán Frers**	**5+**	
Swan 53 Mk I		1986–1994	Germán Frers	50	
Swan 53 Mk II		2004–2015	Germán Frers	20	
Swan 54		2016–2020	Germán Frers		
Swan 55		1970–1974	Sparkman & Stephens	16	
Swan 55CC Frers	CC	1990–1996	Germán Frers	22	
**Swan 55 Frers**		**2021–Present**	**Germán Frers**	**10+**	
Swan 56		1996–2006	Germán Frers	46	
Swan 57		1977–1984	Sparkman & Stephens	49	
Swan 57CC Frers		1990–1997	Germán Frers	22	
Swan 57 RS		1996–2001	Germán Frers	10	
**Swan 58**		**2021–Present**	**Germán Frers**		
Swan 59		1984–1990	Germán Frers	21	
Swan 60		1994–1997	Germán Frers		
Swan 60 FD	FD	2009–2017	Germán Frers	10	
Swan 60 FD	RS	2009–2017	Germán Frers	1	
Swan 601		2004–2007	Germán Frers	6	
Swan 61		1985–1990	Germán Frers	14	
Swan 62	RS	2001–2003	Germán Frers		
Swan 62	FD	2004–2006	Germán Frers		
Swan 65	Ketch	1972–1989	Sparkman & Stephens	41	
Swan 65	Sloop	1972–1989	Sparkman & Stephens	41	
**Swan 65 Frers**		**2018–Present**	**Germán Frers**	**7**	
Swan 651		1982–1991	Germán Frers	19	
Swan 66	FD	2007–2017	Germán Frers		
Swan 66	S	2007–2017	Germán Frers		
Swan 68		1991–2004	Germán Frers	24	
Swan 70		2001–2005	Germán Frers	7	
Swan 75	FD	2004–2012	Germán Frers		
Swan 75	RS	2004–2012	Germán Frers		
Swan 76		1979–1981	Sparkman & Stephens	5	
Swan 77		1992–2003	Germán Frers	10	
**Swan 78**		**2018–Present**	**Germán Frers**	**5**	
Swan 80		1999–2004	Germán Frees	8	
Swan 80 Mk II	FD	2010–2016	Germán Frers	5	
Swan 80 Mk II	S	2012–2016	Germán Frers		
Swan 82	S	1999–2007	Germán Frers	7	
**Swan 80 Mk3**		**2024–Present**	**Germán Frers**	**CONCEPT**	
Swan 86		1988–1990	Germán Frers	3	
**Swan 88**		**2023–**	**Germán Frers**	**0**	
Swan 90		2008–2015	Germán Frers	12	
Swan 95		2017–2018	Germán Frers	1	
**Swan 98**		**2020–**	**Germán Frers**	**3**	
Swan 100	FD	2002–2012	Germán Frers		
Swan 100	RS	2002–2006	Germán Frers		
Swan 100	S	2002–2012	Germán Frers		
Swan 105 RS		2014–2016	Germán Frers	1	
**Swan 108**		**2023–**	**Germán Frers**	**1**	
Swan 112 RS		1999–2006	Germán Frers		
Swan 115		2015–2018	Germán Frers	4	
**Swan 120**		**2021–**	**Germán Frers**	**2**	
**ClubSwan 125**		**2021–**	**Juan Kouyoumdjian**	**1**	
**Swan 128**		**2025–**	**Germán Frers**	**0**	
Swan 131		2006	Germán Frers	1	

(CC = Centre Cockpit; FD = Flush Deck; RS = Raised Saloon; S = Semi-Raised Saloon; DH = Deck House) (Current Swanline in bold)

=== Nautor Swan - Custom Yachts ===
Model	Launch Year	Designer	Launch Name	Notes
Nautor 102	1986	Ron Holland	Garuda	
Nautor 76	2006	Luca Brenta	Silandra V	
Nautor 78	2007	Bill Tripp	Valkyrie	
Swan 82	2008	Germán Frers	Polytropon II	The Swan 82 hull with a custom deck and interior

=== Swan designed, managed, sub-contracted and marketed yachts ===
Swan production yacht models are listed below:

Model	Years	Designer	No Built	Builder	Ref.
**ClubSwan 28**	**2024-**	**Juan Kouyoumdjian**	5+	Built in Spain	
**ClubSwan 36**	**2018–**	**Juan Kouyoumdjian**	Unk	Built in Spain	
ClubSwan 42	2006–2013	Germán Frers	58	Moulded in Estonia; Assembled Nautor Finland	
Volvo Ocean 60 - Amer Sports One	2001	German Frers	1	Built by Composite Works (FRA)	
Volvo Ocean 60 - Amer Sports Too	2001	Bruce Farr	1	Built by Composite Works (FRA)	
ClubSwan 80	2022	Juan Kouyoumdjian	1	Built by Persico (ITA)	

=== Nautor Swan - Productions Powerboats/Motorsailors ===
Model	Years	Designer	Built	Note
**Swan Shadow** and **Overshadow**	**2021 Onwards**	**Jarkko Jämsén**		**Planing Dayboat**
**Swan Arrow**	**2024 Onwards**	**Jarkko Jämsén**	Concept	**Planing Cruiser**
Nautor 39	1977–1978	Sparkman & Stephens	4	Motorsailer
Nautor 40	1972	Don Shead		Planing Cabin Cruiser
Nautor 43	1976 –	Sparkman & Stephens	24	Motorsailer
Nautor 47	1971–1972	Don Shead	7	Planing Cabin Cruiser
Nautor 50	1976–1978	Sparkman & Stephens	9	Motorsailer

== See also ==
- List of sailboat designers and manufacturers
- List of large sailing yachts
- Cult brand
