= Swan 62 =

Racing yacht

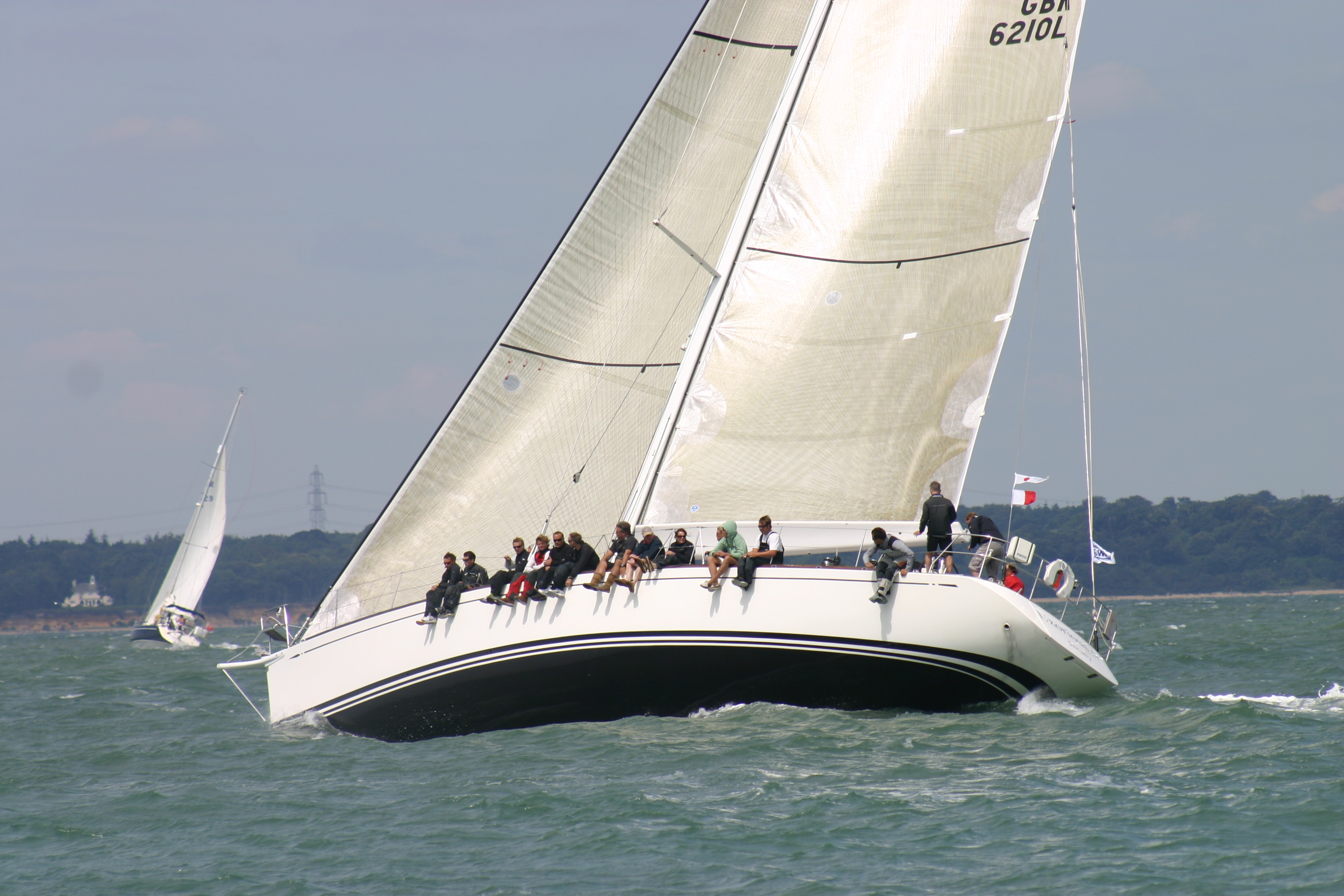

Development
- Location: Finland
- Brand: Swan
- Builder: Nautor Swan OY

Boat
- Displacement: 28,500 kg (62,800 lb) Light; 31,500 kg (69,400 lb) loaded
- Draft: 3.00 m (9.84 ft) - 3.10 m (10.2 ft)

Hull
- Type: Monohull
- LOH: 19.12 m (62.7 ft)
- LWL: 15.90 m (52.2 ft)
- Beam: 5.34 m (17.5 ft)
- Engine: Yanmar 100hp

Hull appendages
- Ballast: 11,200 kg (24,700 lb)

Rig
- Rig type: Sloop
- I foretriangle height: 25.7 m (84 ft)
- J foretriangle base: 7.20 m (23.6 ft)
- P mainsail luff: 23.00 m (75.46 ft)
- E mainsail foot: 7.25 m (23.8 ft)

Sails
- Mainsail area: 83.4 m^{2} (898 sq ft)
- Jib/genoa area: 138.8 m^{2} (1,494 sq ft)
- Luff perpendicular: 150%
- Spinnaker area: 333 m^{2} (3,580 sq ft)

The Swan 62 is a Finnish sailboat, built by Oy Nautor AB.

The model is a development of the 1994 designed Swan 60 using an extended hull mould. With the boat launched as a RS "raised saloon" with more of a cruising emphasis. However the Swan 62RS was later also launched in a flush deck version similar to that of the Swan 60.
