= Swan 70 =

Sailboat class

Development
- Designer: Germán Frers
- Location: Finland
- Year: 2001
- No. built: 7
- Builder: Oy Nautor AB
- Role: Racer-Cruiser
- Name: Swan 70

Boat
- Displacement: 66,138 lb (30,000 kg)
- Draft: 11.29 ft (3.44 m)

Hull
- Type: monohull
- Construction: glassfibre
- LOA: 70.05 ft (21.35 m)
- LWL: 61.68 ft (18.80 m)
- Beam: 17.52 ft (5.34 m)
- Engine: Cummins 130 hp (97 kW) diesel engine

Hull appendages
- Keel: Fin keel
- Ballast: 23,920 lb (10,850 kg)
- Rudder: Spade-type rudder

Rig
- Rig type: Bermuda rig
- I foretriangle height: 96.29 ft (29.35 m)
- J foretriangle base: 26.38 ft (8.04 m)
- P mainsail luff: 87.79 ft (26.76 m)
- E mainsail foot: 29.53 ft (9.00 m)

Sails
- Sailplan: Masthead sloop
- Mainsail area: 1,296.22 sq ft (120.423 m^{2})
- Jib/genoa area: 1,270.07 sq ft (117.993 m^{2})
- Gennaker area: 4,572 sq ft (424.8 m^{2})
- Other sails: 110% jib: 1,397 sq ft (129.8 m^{2})
- Upwind sail area: 2,566.29 sq ft (238.416 m^{2})
- Downwind sail area: 5,868.22 sq ft (545.175 m^{2})

Racing
- PHRF: -60

The Swan 70 is a Finnish sailboat that was designed by Germán Frers as a racer-cruiser and first built in 2001.

== Production ==
The design was built by Oy Nautor AB in Finland, from 2001 to 2005, with seven boats completed but it is now out of production.

== Design ==
The Swan 70 is a racing keelboat, built predominantly of vinylester glassfibre and aramid, with carbon fibre reinforcements and wooden trim, including a teak faced deck. The boat's structural bulkheads are made from pre-preg carbon fibre epoxy with a Nomex honeycomb core. The boat has a masthead sloop rig, four sets of swept spreaders and carbon fibre spars. The hull has a raked stem, a reverse transom with a drop-down tailgate swimming platform, an internally mounted spade-type rudder controlled by dual carbon fibre and wood wheels and a fixed fin keel with a weighted bulb. It displaces 66,138 lb (30,000 kg) and carries 23,920 lb (10,850 kg) of lead ballast.

The boat has a draft of 11.29 ft (3.44 m) with the standard keel and 13 ft (4.0 m) with the optional"regatta" keel.

The boat is fitted with an American Cummins diesel engine of 130 hp (97 kW) for docking and manoeuvring. The fuel tank holds 211 U.S. gallons (800 L; 176 imp gal) and the fresh water tank has a capacity of 164 U.S. gallons (620 L; 137 imp gal).

The design was built with a choice of six different interior layouts. Typical was one with sleeping accommodation for eight people in four cabins; with two cabins forward, each with two bunk beds; two straight settees in the main salon and two aft cabins, each with a double berth. The galley is located on the port side at the companionway ladder. The galley is C-shaped and is equipped with a two-burner stove, a refrigerator, freezer, dishwasher and a double sink. A navigation station is opposite the galley, on the starboard side. There are four heads, one for each cabin.

For sailing downwind the design may be equipped with an asymmetrical spinnaker of 4,572 sq ft (424.8 m^{2}).

The design has a hull speed of 10.52 kn (19.48 km/h) and a PHRF handicap of -60.

== Operational history ==
Swan 70 hull #2, name Serano, came in fourth place in the 2003 Cowes Week in the IRC 0 category.

In a 2003 boats.com review, David McCreary wrote, "Swans have traditionally been regarded as extremely well built, comfortable, and an excellent value, not so much in that they are competitively priced (they're not) but that they command excellent resale prices -- in some instances more than the original price of the boat. Tradition also regarded them as cruisers first, racers second -- and the latter really only at Swan-specific events, utilizing the Swan rating rule promulgated by the Royal Ocean Racing Club's rating office. And, well, to be blunt, slow. Built for comfort, not for speed. No more. One could seriously argue that the [Swan] 70 and 45 are racers first and cruisers second (and a distance second at that)."

In a 2007 review for Yachting Magazine, Dennis Caprio wrote, "I generally need about an hour at the helm to acquaint myself with a boat I’ve never sailed. On this day, I learned the Swan 70 is very responsive, and until I became accustomed to the helm, I over-steered in the tacks and jibes. I discovered also that she tacks fast enough to get ahead of the crew in the relaxed atmosphere of a day sail. Her steering is dead-nuts accurate and quick (two turns from hard over to hard over), and her course so predictable I would not hesitate a second to pick up a mooring under sail or aggressively dice for the best starting position at the line. Precision of this magnitude comes in part from the deep rudder and keel, both of high aspect ratio and shaped to achieve the best possible lift-to-drag ratio."

== See also ==
- List of sailing boat types
