= Bukh =

Bukh is a Danish surname that may refer to the following notable people:

- Arkady Bukh (born 1972), American criminal defense attorney
- Jens Bukh, Danish car manufacturer, designer of Bukh & Gry
- Julie Rydahl Bukh (born 1982), Danish football midfielder
- Niels Bukh (1880–1950), Danish gymnast and educator
