= Swan 76 =

Sailboat class

Development
- Designer: Sparkman & Stephens
- Location: Finland
- Year: 1979
- No. built: 5
- Builder: Oy Nautor AB
- Role: Racer-Cruiser
- Name: Swan 76

Boat
- Displacement: 98,700 lb (44,770 kg)
- Draft: 12.00 ft (3.66 m)

Hull
- Type: monohull
- Construction: glassfibre
- LOA: 76.31 ft (23.26 m)
- LWL: 61.33 ft (18.69 m)
- Beam: 19.03 ft (5.80 m)
- Engine: Mercedes-Benz OM 402 200 hp (149 kW) diesel engine

Hull appendages
- Keel: fin keel
- Ballast: 24,000 lb (10,886 kg)
- Rudder: Skeg-mounted rudder

Rig
- Rig type: Bermuda rig
- I foretriangle height: 87.25 ft (26.59 m)
- J foretriangle base: 27.70 ft (8.44 m)
- P mainsail luff: 79.00 ft (24.08 m)
- E mainsail foot: 21.60 ft (6.58 m)

Sails
- Sailplan: Ketch
- Mainsail area: 853.2 sq ft (79.26 m^{2})
- Jib/genoa area: 1,812.6 sq ft (168.40 m^{2})
- Spinnaker area: 4,350 sq ft (404 m^{2})
- Other sails: Mizzen: 386.9 sq ft (35.94 m^{2}); Mizzen staysail: 1,075 sq ft (99.9 m^{2})
- Total sail area: 2,449.00 sq ft (227.520 m^{2})

The Swan 76 is a Finnish sailboat that was designed by Sparkman & Stephens as a racer-cruiser and first built in 1979.

== Production ==
The design was built by Oy Nautor AB in Finland, from 1979 to 1981, with five boats completed, but it is now out of production.

== Design ==
The Swan 76 is a racing keelboat, built predominantly of glassfibre, with wood trim. It has a masthead ketch rig, a raked stem, a reverse transom, a skeg-mounted rudder controlled by a wheel and a fixed fin keel or optional stub keel and centreboard. It was produced in both flush deck and deckhouse arrangements.

The boat is fitted with a German Mercedes-Benz OM 402 diesel engine of 200 hp (149 kW) for docking and manoeuvring.

For sailing downwind the boat may be equipped with a symmetrical spinnaker of 4,350 sq ft (404 m^{2}). The design has a hull speed of 10.49 kn (19.43 km/h).

== Variants ==
Swan 76
This fixed keel, flush deck, maxi yacht racing model displaces 98,700 lb (44,770 kg) and carries 24,000 lb (10,886 kg) of lead ballast. The boat has a draft of 12.00 ft (3.66 m) with the standard fin keel. The fuel tank holds 555 U.S. gallons (2,100 L; 462 imp gal) and the fresh water tank has a capacity of 1,004 U.S. gallons (3,800 L; 836 imp gal).
Swan 76 DH
This centreboard, deck house cruising model displaces 105,500 lb (47,854 kg) and carries 29,800 lb (13,517 kg) of ballast. The boat has a draft of 12.00 ft (3.66 m) with the centreboard down and 7.60 ft (2.32 m) with it retracted. The fuel tank holds 608 U.S. gallons (2,300 L; 506 imp gal) and the fresh water tank has a capacity of 1,056 U.S. gallons (4,000 L; 879 imp gal).

== See also ==
- List of sailing boat types
