= Swan 115 =

Sailboat class

Development
- Designer: Germán Frers
- Location: Finland
- Year: 2015
- No. built: 4
- Builder: Oy Nautor AB
- Role: Racer-Cruiser
- Name: Swan 115

Boat
- Displacement: 204,000 lb (92,533 kg)
- Draft: 15.42 ft (4.70 m)

Hull
- Type: monohull
- Construction: glassfibre
- LOA: 115.48 ft (35.20 m)
- LWL: 107.74 ft (32.84 m)
- Beam: 26.64 ft (8.12 m)
- Engine: Scania AB DI13 070M 450 hp (336 kW) diesel engine

Hull appendages
- Keel: Fin keel with weighted bulb
- Ballast: 70,547 lb (32,000 kg)
- Rudder: Dual spade-type rudders

Rig
- Rig type: Bermuda rig
- I foretriangle height: 145.73 ft (44.42 m)
- J foretriangle base: 43.80 ft (13.35 m)
- P mainsail luff: 142.71 ft (43.50 m)
- E mainsail foot: 44.62 ft (13.60 m)

Sails
- Sailplan: Masthead sloop
- Mainsail area: 3,755 sq ft (348.9 m^{2})
- Jib/genoa area: 3,270 sq ft (304 m^{2})
- Gennaker area: 6,781 sq ft (630.0 m^{2})
- Upwind sail area: 7,025 sq ft (652.6 m^{2})
- Downwind sail area: 10,536 sq ft (978.8 m^{2})

The Swan 115 is a Finnish superyacht sailboat that was designed by Germán Frers as a racer-cruiser and first built in 2015. The design was built in both fixed keel and lifting keel versions as well as with two deck configurations, flush deck ("FD") and raised salon ("S").

== Production ==
The design was built by Oy Nautor AB in Finland, starting in 2015, with four boats completed, but it is now out of production.

== Design ==
The Swan 115 is a recreational keelboat, built predominantly of carbon fibre with a Nomex sandwich core and wooden trim. It has a masthead sloop rig, with a keel-stepped mast, carbon fibre spars, four sets of swept spreaders. The hull has a plumb stem, a reverse transom with a drop-down tailgate swimming platform, a dinghy garage, dual spade-type rudders controlled by dual wheels and a fixed fin keel with a weighted bulb or optional lifting keel. It displaces 204,000 lb (92,533 kg) and carries 70,547 lb (32,000 kg) of lead ballast.

The keel-equipped version of the boat has a draft of 15.42 ft (4.70 m), while the lifting keel version has a draft of 18.86 ft (5.75 m) with the keel extended and 11.48 ft (3.50 m) with it retracted, allowing operation in shallow water.

The boat is fitted with a Swedish Scania AB DI13 070M diesel engine of 450 hp (336 kW) for docking and manoeuvring.

The design has sleeping accommodation for 14 people in seven cabins, with a double island berth in the bow cabin, two forward cabins each with two bunks, an L-shaped settee and two straight settees in the main cabin, a midship cabin with a double and three aft cabins each with two bunk beds. The galley is located on the starboard side just aft of the companionway ladder. The galley is W-shaped with an island. There are seven heads, one for each cabin.

For sailing downwind the design may be equipped with an asymmetrical spinnaker of 6,781 sq ft (630.0 m^{2}). The boat has a hull speed of 13.91 kn (25.76 km/h).

== Operational history ==
The design was introduced at the 2015 Monaco Yacht Show.

The first boat, an "S" model, was delivered to Leonardo Ferragamo, director of Salvatore Ferragamo S.p.A. and chairman of Nautor's Swan in 2015.

A Boat International article named the Swan 115 as one of the "6 of the best Nautor's Swan sailing yachts"."

In a 2015 review for Yachting World, Elaine Bunting wrote, "With orders for four 115s, the move to semi custom carbon superyacht territory has been perhaps more successful than even Nautor dared hope. The company seems to have timed it just right: after a sharp contraction in sailing superyachts builds since 2008, demand is returning, though tentatively, and Nautor's Swan is well-placed by being such a long-established prestige brand ... Superyacht it may be, but this looks like a proper sailing yacht and its design and execution has a timeless quality that would not be foreign to any Swan owner of times gone by."

== See also ==
- List of sailing boat types
