= Swan 41 =

Finnish sailboat class

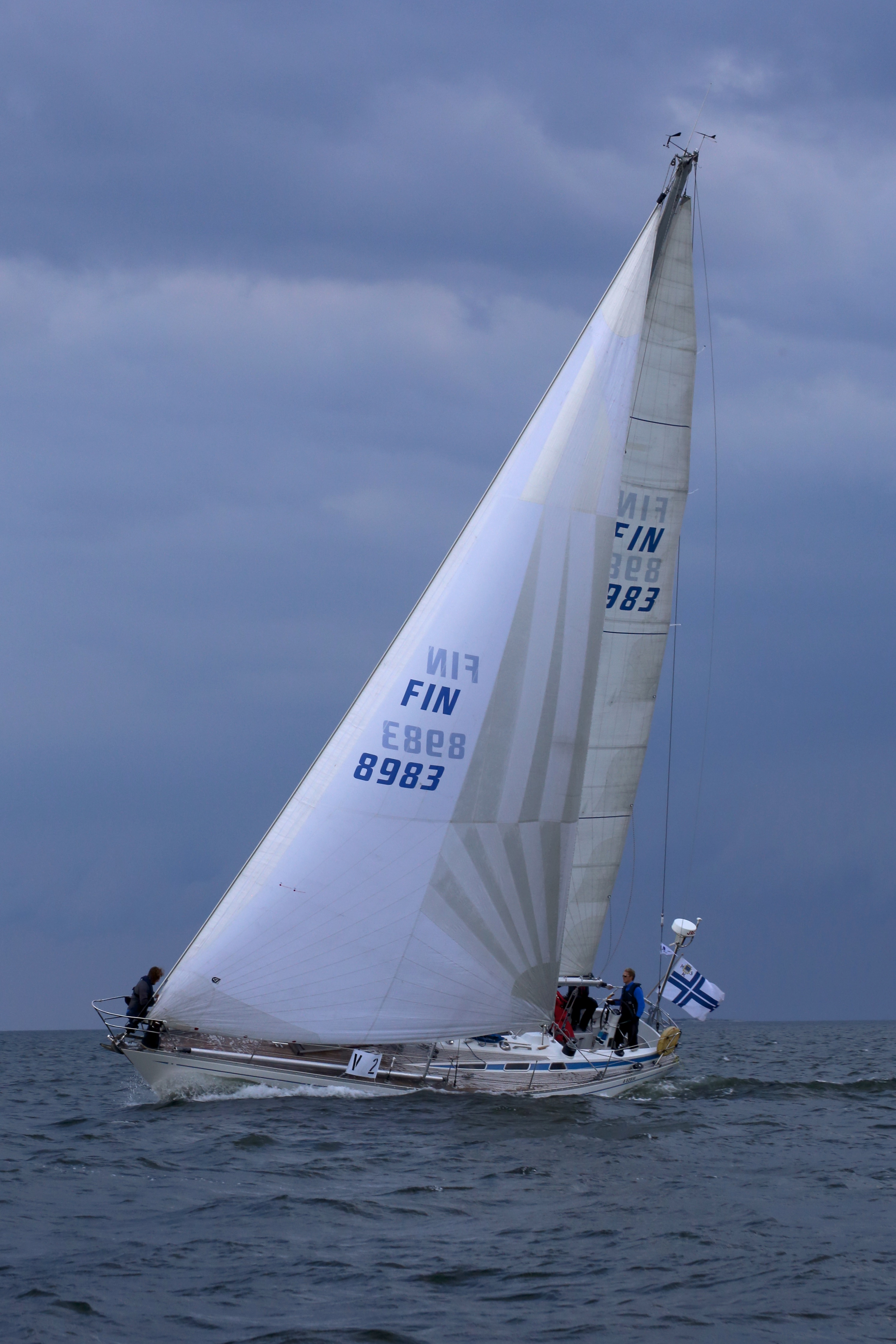

Development
- Designer: Sparkman & Stephens
- Location: Finland
- Year: 1973
- No. built: 61
- Builder: Oy Nautor AB
- Role: Cruiser
- Name: Swan 41

Boat
- Displacement: 23,800 lb (10,795 kg)
- Draft: 6.90 ft (2.10 m)

Hull
- Type: monohull
- Construction: glassfibre
- LOA: 41.01 ft (12.50 m)
- LWL: 30.25 ft (9.22 m)
- Beam: 11.94 ft (3.64 m)
- Engine: Perkins Engines 4-108 37 hp (28 kW) diesel engine

Hull appendages
- Keel: fin keel
- Ballast: 9,700 lb (4,400 kg)
- Rudder: skeg-mounted rudder

Rig
- Rig type: Bermuda rig
- I foretriangle height: 54.00 ft (16.46 m)
- J foretriangle base: 17.85 ft (5.44 m)
- P mainsail luff: 48.00 ft (14.63 m)
- E mainsail foot: 13.00 ft (3.96 m)

Sails
- Sailplan: masthead sloop
- Mainsail area: 312.00 sq ft (28.986 m^{2})
- Jib/genoa area: 481.95 sq ft (44.775 m^{2})
- Total sail area: 793.95 sq ft (73.760 m^{2})

Racing
- PHRF: 102-114

The Swan 41 is a Finnish sailboat that was designed by Sparkman & Stephens as a cruiser and first built in 1973. It was Sparkman & Stephens' design #2150.

== Production ==
The design was built by Oy Nautor AB in Finland, from 1973 to 1977 with 61 boats completed, but it is now out of production.

== Design ==
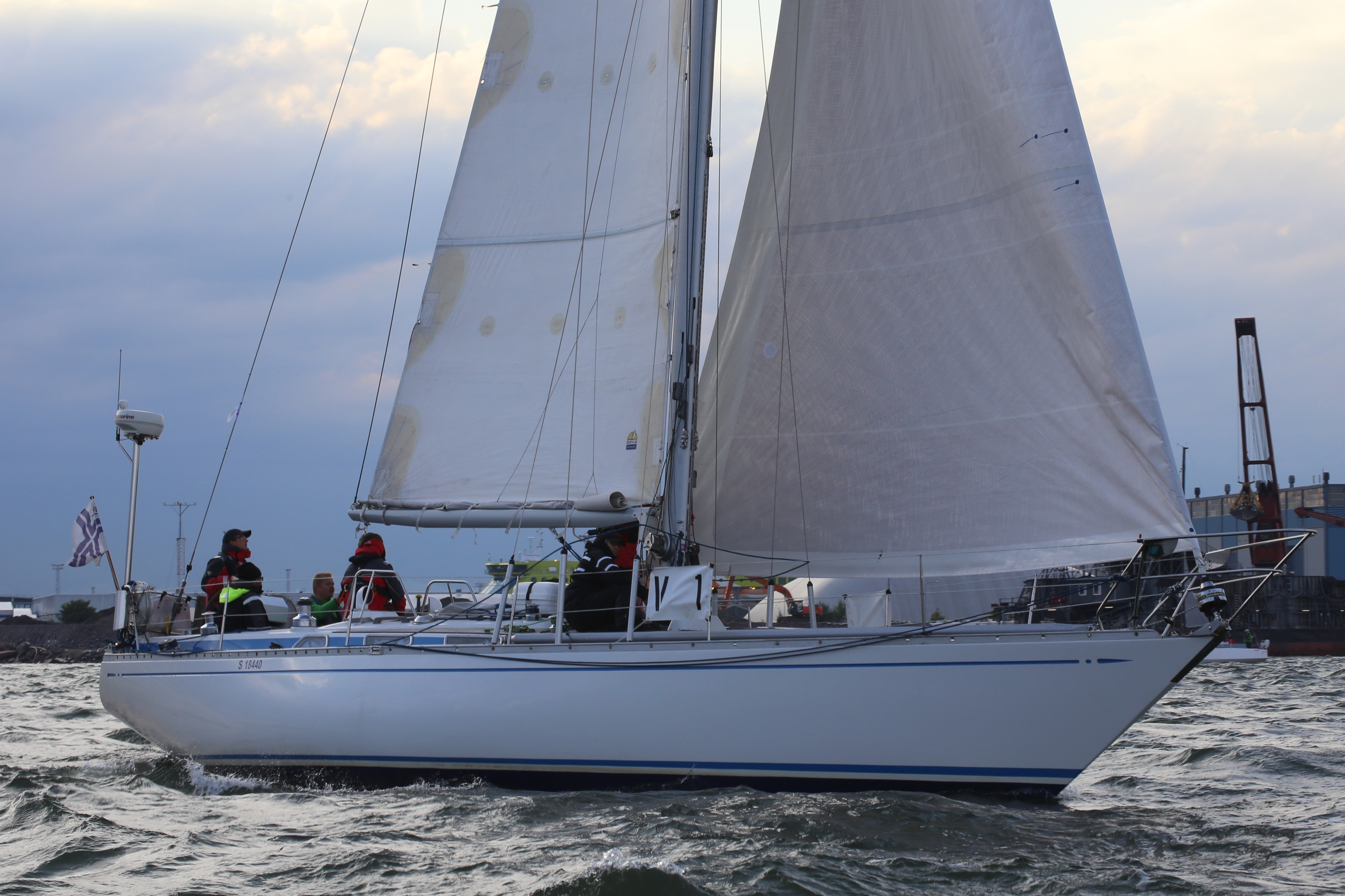
Swan 41

The Swan 41 is a recreational keelboat, built predominantly of glassfibre, with wood trim. It has a masthead sloop rig; a raked stem; a raised counter, reverse transom; a skeg-mounted rudder controlled by a wheel and a fixed, swept fin keel. It displaces 23,800 lb (10,795 kg) and carries 9,700 lb (4,400 kg) of lead ballast. A 3 ft (0.91 m) shorter mast was also available.

The boat has a draft of 6.90 ft (2.10 m) with the standard fin keel.

The boat is fitted with a British Perkins Engines 4-108 diesel engine of 37 hp (28 kW) for docking and manoeuvring. The fuel tank holds 26 U.S. gallons (98 L; 22 imp gal) and the fresh water tank has a capacity of 66 U.S. gallons (250 L; 55 imp gal).

The design has sleeping accommodation for eight people, with a double "V"-berth in the bow cabin, two straight settee berths and two pilot berths in the main cabin and two aft cabins, each with a single berth. The galley is located on the port side just forward of the companionway ladder. The galley is L-shaped and is equipped with a three-burner stove, an ice box and a sink. A navigation station is opposite the galley, on the starboard side. The head is located opposite the galley, aft of the companionway on the starboard side.

The design has a hull speed of 7.37 kn (13.65 km/h) and a PHRF handicap of 102 to 114.

== See also ==
- List of sailing boat types
