= Swan 39 =

Sailboat class

Development
- Designer: Ron Holland
- Location: Finland
- Year: 1978
- No. built: 33
- Builder: Oy Nautor AB
- Role: Racer-Cruiser
- Name: Swan 39

Boat
- Displacement: 18,000 lb (8,165 kg)
- Draft: 7.20 ft (2.19 m)

Hull
- Type: monohull
- Construction: glassfibre
- LOA: 39.30 ft (11.98 m)
- LWL: 31.50 ft (9.60 m)
- Beam: 12.50 ft (3.81 m)
- Engine: Perkins Engines 4-108 diesel engine

Hull appendages
- Keel: fin keel
- Ballast: 7,900 lb (3,583 kg)
- Rudder: Spade-type rudder

Rig
- Rig type: Bermuda rig
- I foretriangle height: 54.00 ft (16.46 m)
- J foretriangle base: 16.50 ft (5.03 m)
- P mainsail luff: 47.50 ft (14.48 m)
- E mainsail foot: 13.30 ft (4.05 m)

Sails
- Sailplan: Masthead sloop
- Mainsail area: 315.88 sq ft (29.346 m^{2})
- Jib/genoa area: 445.50 sq ft (41.388 m^{2})
- Total sail area: 761.38 sq ft (70.735 m^{2})

Racing
- PHRF: 78-87

The Swan 39 is a Finnish sailboat that was designed by Ron Holland as an International Offshore Rule (IOR) racer and a cruiser and first built in 1978.

The production boat was based on IMP, a very successful IOR racer built in 1977 that represented the United States in the 1977 and 1979 Admiral's Cup.

== Production ==
The design was built by Oy Nautor AB in Finland, from 1978 to 1980, with 33 boats completed, but it is now out of production. The boat was built in both dedicated racing and cruising versions, with 12 of the racing configuration and 21 of the cruising model built.

The Swan 39 was the first Holland design that was produced Oy Nautor AB.

== Design ==
The Swan 39 is a recreational keelboat, built predominantly of glassfibre, with wood trim. It has a masthead sloop rig, a raked stem, a reverse transom, an internally mounted spade-type rudder controlled by a wheel and a fixed fin keel. It displaces 18,000 lb (8,165 kg) and carries 7,900 lb (3,583 kg) of lead ballast.

The boat has a draft of 7.20 ft (2.19 m) with the standard keel.

The boat is fitted with a British Perkins Engines 4-108 diesel engine for docking and manoeuvring. The fuel tank holds 32 U.S. gallons (120 L; 27 imp gal) and the fresh water tank has a capacity of 80 U.S. gallons (300 L; 67 imp gal).

The design has sleeping accommodation for eight people, with a double "V"-berth in the bow cabin, two straight settees around a drop leaf table and two pilot berths in the main cabin and two aft cabins with a single berth in each. The galley is located on the starboard side of the companionway ladder. The galley is of straight configuration and is equipped with a three-burner stove, an ice box and a sink. A navigation station is opposite the galley, on the port side. The head is located just aft of the bow cabin on the port side.

For sailing downwind the design may be equipped with a symmetrical spinnaker.

The design has a hull speed of 7.52 kn (13.93 km/h) and a PHRF handicap of 78 to 87.

== Operational history ==
The first Swan World Cup was held in August and September 1980, off the coast of Porto Cervo, Sardinia, with 59 Swan boats participating. The overall winner was an Italian Swan 39 named Black Swan.

== See also ==
- List of sailing boat types
