= Swan 131 =

Sailboat design

Development
- Location: Finland
- Year: 2006
- No. built: 1
- Brand: Swan
- Builder: Nautor Swan OY
- Name: Swan 131

Boat
- Displacement: 180,000 kg (400,000 lb) Light; 200,000 kg (440,000 lb) Loaded
- Draft: 4.70 m (15.4 ft)

Hull
- Type: Monohull
- LOH: 40.00 m (131.23 ft)
- LWL: 34.96 m (114.7 ft)
- Beam: 8.50 m (27.9 ft)

Hull appendages
- Ballast: 36,000 kg (79,000 lb)

Rig
- Rig type: Masthead
- I foretriangle height: 50.32 m (165.1 ft)
- J foretriangle base: 15.00 m (49.21 ft)
- P mainsail luff: 47.00 m (154.20 ft)
- E mainsail foot: 15.64 m (51.3 ft)

Sails
- Mainsail area: 377.40 m^{2} (4,062.3 sq ft)
- Other sails: 368 m^{2} (3,960 sq ft) Foretriangle

The Swan 131 was designed by German Frers and Nautor's Swan with only one built and "Aristarchos" was launched in 2006 it is the largest boat produced to date by the yard.
