= Swan 441 =

Sailboat class

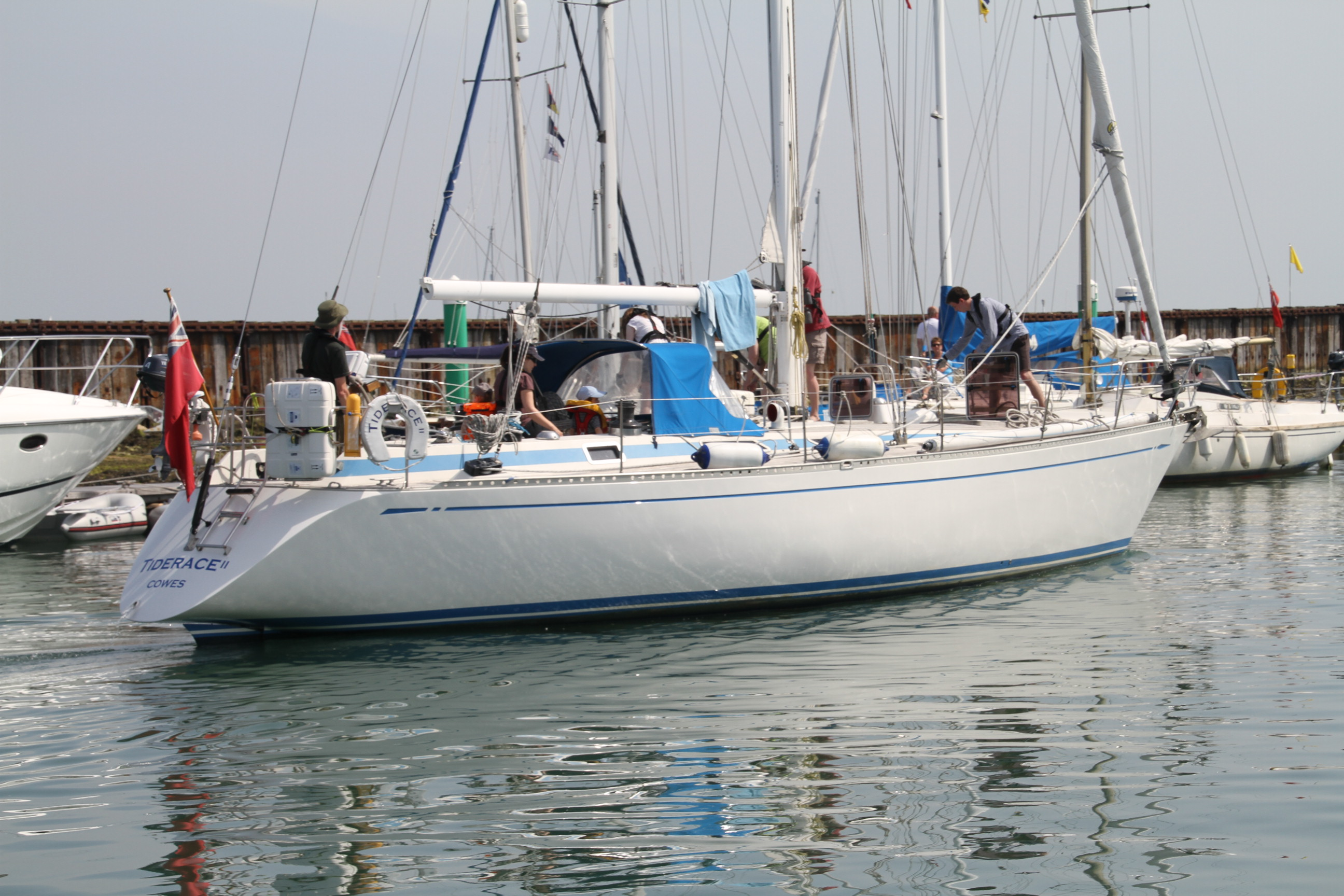

Development
- Designer: Ron Holland
- Location: Finland
- Year: 1979
- No. built: 40
- Builder: Oy Nautor AB
- Role: Cruiser-Racer
- Name: Swan 441

Boat
- Displacement: 24,700 lb (11,204 kg)
- Draft: 6.50 ft (1.98 m)

Hull
- Type: monohull
- Construction: glassfibre
- LOA: 44.36 ft (13.52 m)
- LWL: 36.75 ft (11.20 m)
- Beam: 13.32 ft (4.06 m)
- Engine: Perkins Engines 4-108M 40 hp (30 kW) diesel engine

Hull appendages
- Keel: fin keel
- Ballast: 11,000 lb (4,990 kg)
- Rudder: Spade-type rudder

Rig
- Rig type: Bermuda rig
- I foretriangle height: 60.00 ft (18.29 m)
- J foretriangle base: 19.00 ft (5.79 m)
- P mainsail luff: 54.00 ft (16.46 m)
- E mainsail foot: 14.50 ft (4.42 m)

Sails
- Sailplan: Masthead sloop
- Mainsail area: 398 sq ft (37.0 m^{2})
- Jib/genoa area: 850 sq ft (79 m^{2})
- Spinnaker area: 2,045 sq ft (190.0 m^{2})
- Upwind sail area: 1,249 sq ft (116.0 m^{2})
- Downwind sail area: 2,443 sq ft (227.0 m^{2})

Racing
- PHRF: 54-75

The Swan 441 is a Finnish sailboat that was designed by Ron Holland as a cruiser-racer and first built in 1979. The Swan 441 R is a more racing-oriented version of the design, first built in 1978.

== Production ==
The design was built by Oy Nautor AB in Finland, but it is now out of production. The 441 was built from 1979 to 1980, with 40 boats completed, while the 441 R was produced between 1978 and 1979 with five boats built.

== Design ==
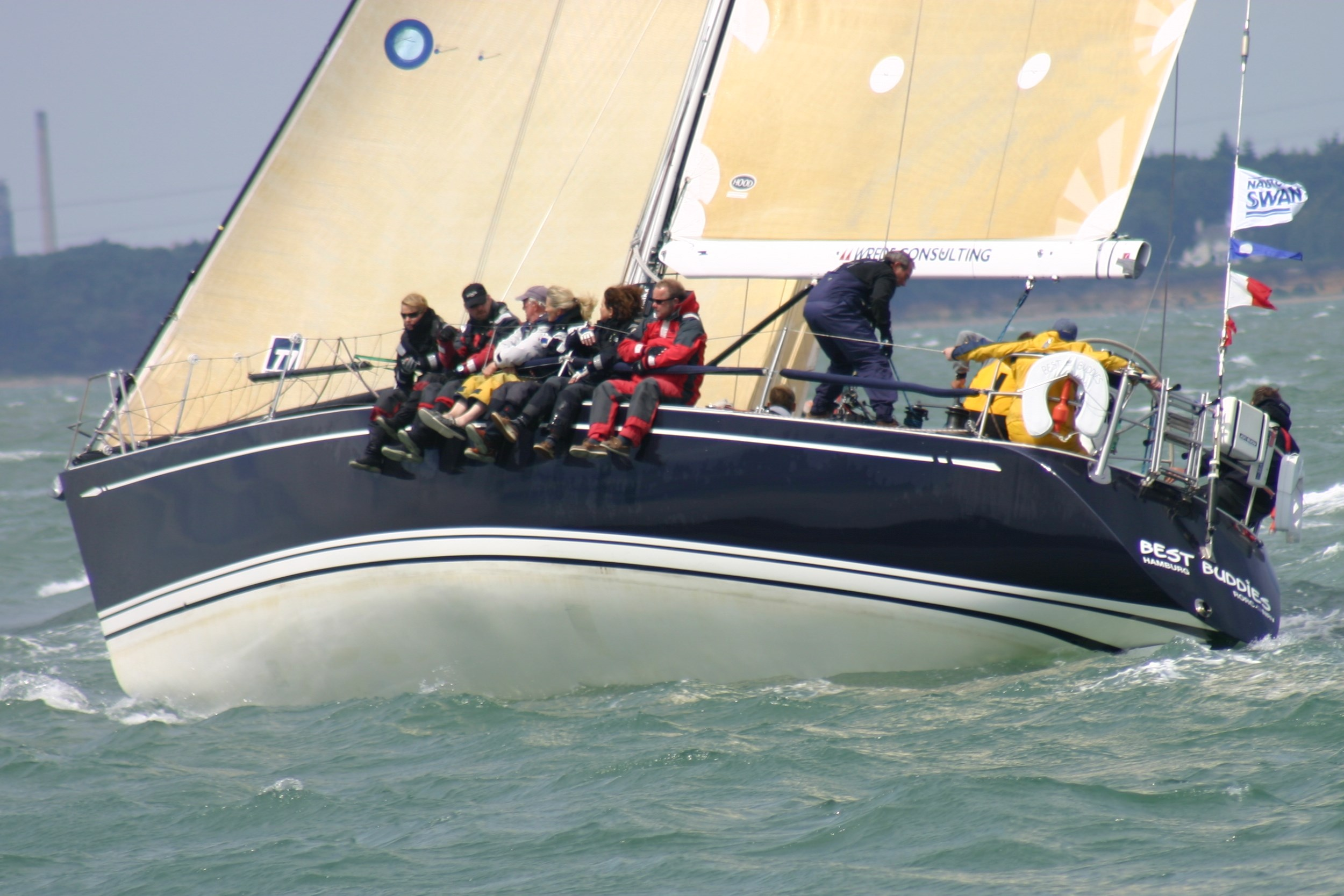
Swan 441

The Swan 441 is a recreational keelboat, built predominantly of glassfibre, with wood trim. It has a masthead sloop rig, with a keel-stepped mast, two sets of unswept spreaders and aluminium spars. The hull has a raked stem, a reverse transom, an internally mounted spade-type rudder controlled by a wheel and a fixed fin keel or optional deep-draft keel.

The design has sleeping accommodation for nine people, with a double "V"-berth in the bow cabin, an L-shaped settee and a straight settee in the main cabin, with pilot berths above an aft cabin with a double berth on the port side and a single berth to starboard. The galley is located on the port side just aft of the companionway ladder. The galley is L-shaped and is equipped with a three-burner stove, an ice box and a double sink. A navigation station is opposite the galley, on the starboard side. There are two heads, one just aft of the bow cabin on the starboard side and one on the port side in the aft cabin. Cabin maximum headroom is 76 in (193 cm).

For sailing downwind the design may be equipped with a symmetrical spinnaker of 2,045 sq ft (190.0 m^{2}).

The design has a hull speed of 8.12 kn (15.04 km/h).

== Variants ==
Swan 441
This cruising model was introduced in 1979. It has a length overall of 44.36 ft (13.5 m), a waterline length of 36.75 ft (11.2 m), displaces 24,700 lb (11,204 kg), carries 11,000 lb (4,990 kg) of lead ballast and has a draft of 6.50 ft (1.98 m) with the standard keel. The boat is fitted with a British Perkins Engines 4-108M diesel engine of 40 hp (30 kW). The fuel tank holds 50 U.S. gallons (190 L; 42 imp gal) and the fresh water tank has a capacity of 100 U.S. gallons (380 L; 83 imp gal). It has a PHRF racing average handicap of 54 to 75.
Swan 441 R
This model was introduced in 1978. It has a length overall of 44.42 ft (13.5 m), a waterline length of 36.75 ft (11.2 m), displaces 24,500 lb (11,113 kg) and carries 13,700 lb (6,214 kg) of lead ballast. The boat has a draft of 7.90 ft (2.41 m) with the standard deep-draft keel. The boat is fitted with a British Perkins Engines diesel engine of 40 hp (30 kW). The fuel tank holds 49 U.S. gallons (190 L; 41 imp gal) and the fresh water tank has a capacity of 97 U.S. gallons (370 L; 81 imp gal). The boat has a PHRF racing average handicap of 60 to 66.

== Operational history ==
Sailboat Lab reports, "the Swan 441 is a moderate weight sailboat which is a good performer. It is very stable / stiff and has a good righting capability if capsized. It is best suited as a bluewater cruising boat. The fuel capacity is average. There is a good water supply range."

In a 2016 Yacht World story about a 441 R refurbishment, Zuzana Prochazka noted, "when a yacht gets to be 30 years old, or more, the pool of potential owners willing to lavish care and attention grows smaller and smaller. But there are some vessels that just stand out – and the Swan 441R is one of those. Extremely sought-after, they rarely come on the market".

A Swan 441, named Race Passage came in third in the 1980 Victoria, British Columbia to Lahaina, Maui Clipper Cup race.

Swan 441, named Carissa, was used by the first Finnish all-female crew to cross the Atlantic from west to east in the ARC Europe Rally 2022.

== See also ==
- List of sailing boat types
