= Bukh & Gry =

The Bukh & Gry was a Danish automobile manufactured in 1904. Its creators, Jens Bukh and John Gry, had both worked in the American automotive industry; together they built only one car, manufactured at Hørve and shown at the Tivoli Gardens in Copenhagen in 1905. This model had a water-cooled 10/12 hp two-cylinder engine and friction drive; no further cars were built. They continued their business with the construction of diesel engines for tractors and industrial purpose. In 1915 the factory moved from Hørve to Kalundborg. Now being close to the Kalundborg shipyard, Bukh produced maritime engines.
