= Vanadis =

Vanadis may refer to:

- Vanadís, an additional name of the Norse goddess Freyja
- 240 Vanadis, a main-belt asteroid
- Vanadis (annelid), a genus of polychaetes in the family Phyllodocidae

== Ships ==
- Lady Hutton, originally Vanadis, a 1924 motor yacht
- TS Vanadis, a 1908 steam yacht
- USS Vanadis (AKA-49), later USS Thor, an Artemis-class attack cargo ship

== See also ==
- Lord Marksman and Vanadis, a Japanese light novel series
