= Swan 57 =

Sailboat class

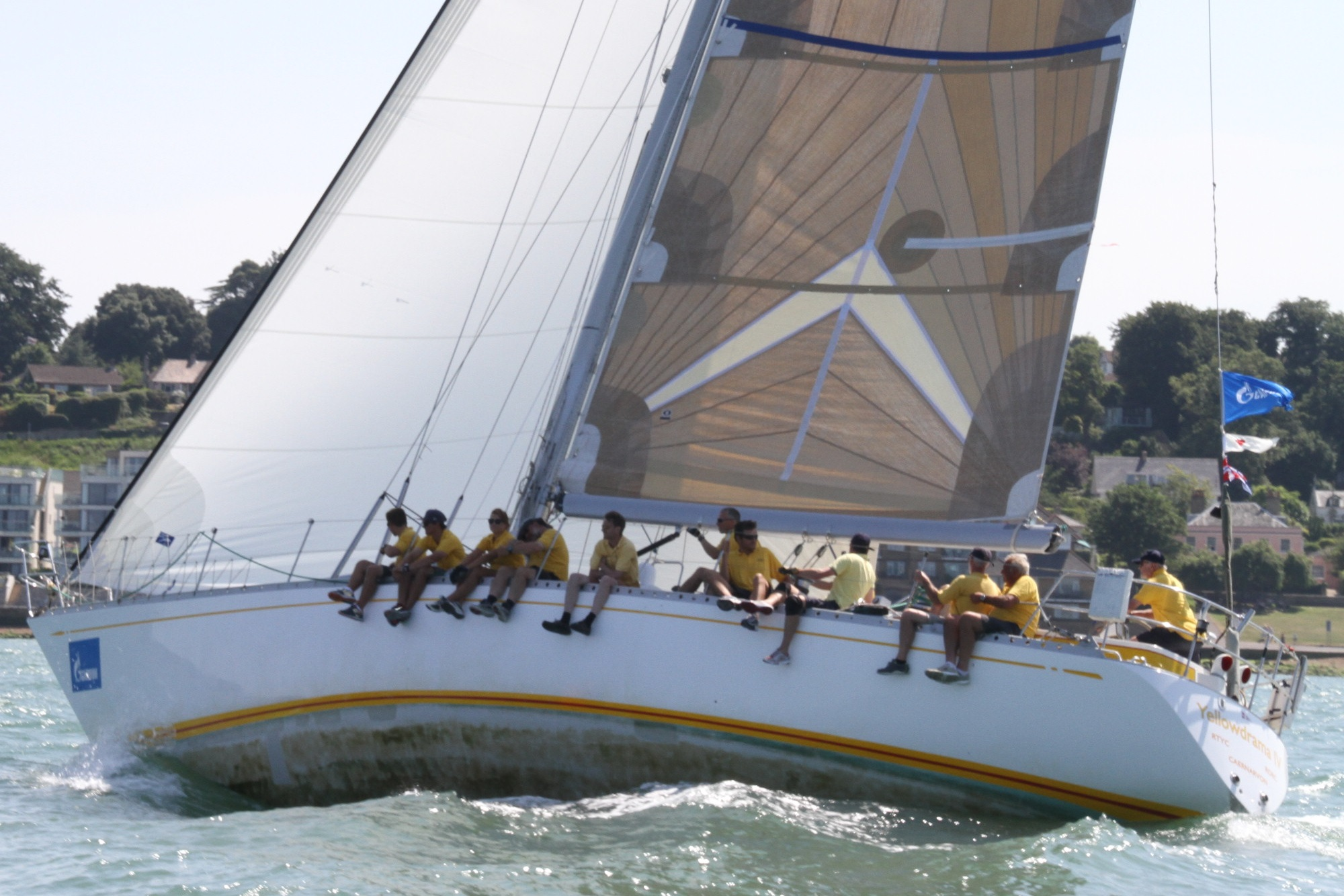

Development
- Designer: Sparkman & Stephens
- Location: Finland
- Year: 1977
- No. built: 49
- Builder: Oy Nautor AB
- Role: Racer-Cruiser
- Name: Swan 57

Boat
- Displacement: 49,500 lb (22,453 kg)
- Draft: 9.10 ft (2.77 m)

Hull
- Type: monohull
- Construction: glassfibre
- LOA: 57.41 ft (17.50 m)
- LWL: 45.81 ft (13.96 m)
- Beam: 15.85 ft (4.83 m)
- Engine: Perkins Engines 4.236 M 73 hp (54 kW) diesel engine

Hull appendages
- Keel: fin keel
- Ballast: 18,900 lb (8,573 kg)
- Rudder: Skeg-mounted rudder

Rig
- Rig type: Bermuda rig
- I foretriangle height: 72.00 ft (21.95 m)
- J foretriangle base: 2,350 ft (720 m)
- P mainsail luff: 64.85 ft (19.77 m)
- E mainsail foot: 19.00 ft (5.79 m)

Sails
- Sailplan: Masthead sloop
- Mainsail area: 616.1 sq ft (57.24 m^{2})
- Jib/genoa area: 1,269 sq ft (117.9 m^{2})
- Spinnaker area: 3,046 sq ft (283.0 m^{2})
- Upwind sail area: 1,885.1 sq ft (175.13 m^{2})
- Downwind sail area: 3,662.1 sq ft (340.22 m^{2})

Racing
- PHRF: 21-45

The Swan 57 is a Finnish sailboat that was designed by Olin Stephens of Sparkman & Stephens as a racer-cruiser and first built in 1977. The boat is Sparkman & Stephens' design #2297 and was their last Swan boat designed.

The design is sometimes confused with the unrelated 1990 Swan 57CC Frers or the 1996 Swan 57 RS designs.

== Production ==
The design was built by Oy Nautor AB in Finland, from 1977 to 1984 with 49 boats completed, but it is now out of production.

== Design ==
The Swan 57 is a racing keelboat, built predominantly of glassfibre, with wood trim. It has a masthead sloop rig or optional ketch rig, with a raked stem, a reverse transom, a skeg-mounted rudder controlled by a wheel and a fixed fin keel or optional stub keel and centreboard. The ketch version has a boomkin for the mizzen mainsheet.

The fin keel model displaces 49,500 lb (22,453 kg) and carries 18,900 lb (8,573 kg) of lead ballast, while the centerboard version displaces 51,500 lb (23,360 kg) and carries 20,900 lb (9,480 kg) of lead ballast.

The keel-equipped version of the boat has a draft of 9.10 ft (2.77 m), while the centerboard-equipped version has a draft of 10.20 ft (3.11 m) with the centerboard extended and 6.40 ft (1.95 m) with it retracted, allowing operation in shallow water.

The boat is fitted with a British Perkins Engines 4.236 M diesel engine of 73 hp (54 kW) for docking and manoeuvring. The fuel tank holds 151 U.S. gallons (570 L; 126 imp gal) and the fresh water tank has a capacity of 264 U.S. gallons (1,000 L; 220 imp gal).

The design has sleeping accommodation for nine people, with a double "V"-berth in the bow cabin, an U-shaped settee and a straight settee in the main salon, two bunk beds and a single bed in the forward salon and two aft cabins, one with a double berth on the port side and a single berth on the starboard. The galley is located on the port side, abeam the companionway ladder. The galley is C-shaped and is equipped with a three-burner stove, an ice box and a double sink. A navigation station is opposite the galley, on the starboard side. There are two heads, one just aft of the bow cabin on the starboard side and one on the port side, aft.

For sailing downwind the design may be equipped with a symmetrical spinnaker of 3,046 sq ft (283.0 m^{2}) or 2,960 sq ft (275 m^{2}) for the ketch-rigged model.

The design has a hull speed of 9.07 kn (16.80 km/h). The sloop rigged boat with a fixed keel has a PHRF handicap of 21 to 63, the sloop centreboard version 39 to 51, the ketch fixed keel 57 and the ketch with the centreboard 54 to 60.

== Operational history ==
In a 2009 review, yacht broker Richard Jordan wrote, "the 57-footer has the classic S&S rocket ship stern, modest sheerline, and raked bow. These Swans always are handsome yachts with their sexy low freeboard and wide decks. More than one client we have tried to talk out of buying a boat this size, but the siren call of a Swan is a powerful draw. Even 30 years after her introduction, a Swan 57 is sure to be one of the prettiest yachts in any harbor."

== See also ==
- List of sailing boat types
