= O. M. Watts =

Oswald Martin Watts
- Born: March 18, 1901; Streatham, London, United Kingdom
- Died: November 1, 1985 (aged 84)
- Occupations: Master mariner, ships chandler, author, yacht designer
- Known for: Captain O M Watts chandlery and brokerage

Oswald Martin Watts, FRAS, FIN (18 March 1901 – 1 November 1985) was a master mariner and nautical author who founded the ship chandlers and yacht brokerage Captain O. M. Watts. He had a large showroom and mail order department at 49 Albemarle Street, London W1

== Early life and family ==
Oswald Watts was born in Streatham on 18 March 1901 to Alfred Ernest Watts, a chartered accountant, and his wife Lilian.

== Career ==
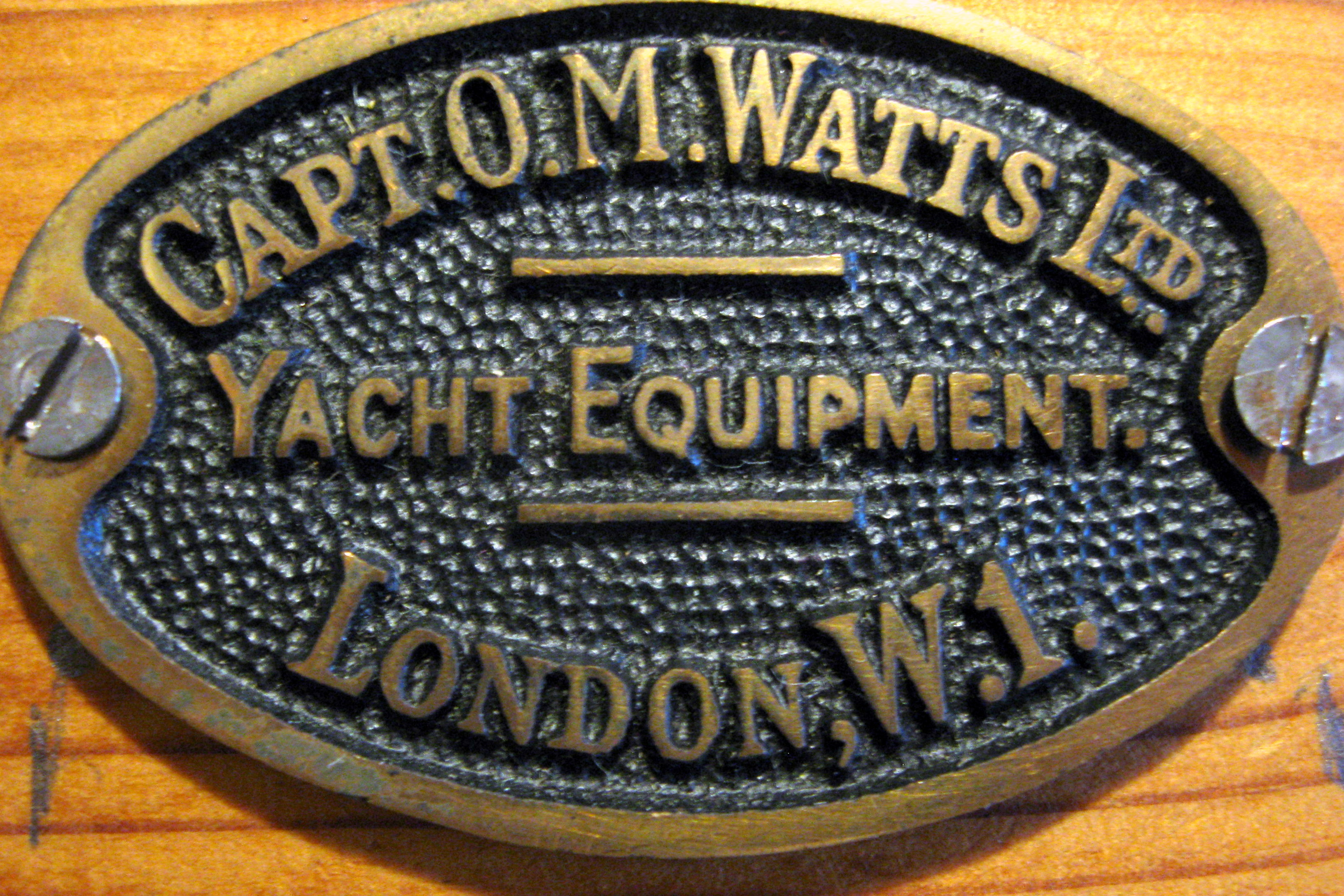
Small plaque used by Capt. O. M. Watts Ltd on goods or designs supplied

Watts was a master mariner and nautical author who founded the ship chandlers and yacht brokerage Captain O. M. Watts. During the Second World War and before Watts trained a large number of sailors to their then Yacht Master's (Coastal) certificate. He was also a yacht designer.

In 1965, the BBC weather forecasts for coastal waters were introduced as a result of strong representations on the part of Capt O M Watts, Vice Commodore City Livery Yacht Club, and an editor of ‘Reed’s Nautical Almanac’, together with support from other notable sailors including Senior Rear Commodore Capt W H Coombs, CBE RNR, one of the Younger Brethren of Trinity House.

== Personal life and death ==
Watts lived in Norbury, London, SW16 and died on 1 November 1985. He was married and had a daughter.

Watts was commodore of the City Livery Yacht Club from 1966 to 1980.

== Selected publications ==
- Lockwood's Manuals. Ship Stability & Trim Made Easy Including The Construction And Use Of Tipping . Scale And Slip Table, Etc. Published 1 January 1926 by Crosby Lockwood & Son
- The Sextant Simplified A Practical Explanation of the Use of the Sextant at Sea, Published 1 January 1973 by Thomas Reed Publications
- Coastal & Ocean Seamanship, (Ed.) Thomas Reed Publications, 1971 ISBN 978-0901281265
- Log Book for Yachts (Ed.) ISBN 978-0900335426
- Practical Shipmasters' Business, Published 1 January 1927 by Imray
- Hints to Up-to-date Navigators, published 1 January 1927 by Crosby Lockwood
- Practical Cargo Stowage for Ships' Officers Captain H. H. Bridger and Captain O. M. Watts, Published by Imray, Laurie, Norie and Wilson Ltd, 123 Minories, London, 1930
- Stanford's Coloured Chart of the English Channel from the Goodwins to Selsey Bill Watts, Captain O.M., Published by Edward Stanford, London (20-22 Maddox Street, Mayfair address)

=== As editor ===
- Reed's Nautical Almanac
