= Beneteau Cyclades 43.3 =

Sailboat class

Development
- Designer: Berret-Racoupeau
- Location: France
- Year: 2007
- Builder: Beneteau
- Role: Cruiser
- Name: Beneteau Cyclades 43.3

Boat
- Displacement: 19,797 lb (8,980 kg)
- Draft: 6.23 ft (1.90 m)

Hull
- Type: monohull
- Construction: glassfibre
- LOA: 43.50 ft (13.26 m)
- LWL: 40.65 ft (12.39 m)
- Beam: 14.53 ft (4.43 m)
- Engine: Yanmar 56 hp (42 kW) diesel engine

Hull appendages
- Keel: Fin keel with weighted bulb
- Ballast: 6,393 lb (2,900 kg)
- Rudder: Spade-type rudder

Rig
- Rig type: Bermuda rig
- I foretriangle height: 50.69 ft (15.45 m)
- J foretriangle base: 15.29 ft (4.66 m)
- P mainsail luff: 48.88 ft (14.90 m)
- E mainsail foot: 17.55 ft (5.35 m)

Sails
- Sailplan: Fractional rigged sloop
- Mainsail area: 428.92 sq ft (39.848 m^{2})
- Jib/genoa area: 387.53 sq ft (36.003 m^{2})
- Total sail area: 816.45 sq ft (75.851 m^{2})

The Beneteau Cyclades 43.3, sometimes just called the Cyclades 43, is a French sailboat that was designed by Berret-Racoupeau as a cruiser primarily aimed at the yacht charter market and first built in 2007. The series is named for the Greek island chain.

The design was also sold as the Moorings 43.3 and Moorings 44.3 for Moorings Yacht Charter and is the same design as the four-cabin Cyclades 43.4.

== Production ==
The design was built by Beneteau in France, from 2007 to 2010, but it is now out of production.

== Design ==
The Cyclades 43.3 is a recreational keelboat, built predominantly of glassfibre, with wood trim. The hull and deck are both fibreglass with a balsa core. It has a fractional sloop rig, with a deck-stepped mast, two sets of swept spreaders and aluminium spars with stainless steel wire standing rigging. The hull has a slightly raked stem, a walk-through reverse transom with a swimming platform, an internally mounted spade-type rudder controlled by dual wheels and a fixed fin keel with a weighted bulb. It displaces 19,797 lb (8,980 kg) and carries 6,393 lb (2,900 kg) of cast iron ballast.

The boat has a draft of 6.23 ft (1.90 m) with the standard keel.

The boat is fitted with a Japanese Yanmar diesel engine of 56 hp (42 kW) for docking and manoeuvring. The fuel tank holds 53 U.S. gallons (200 L; 44 imp gal) and the fresh water tank has a capacity of 140 U.S. gallons (530 L; 120 imp gal).

The design has sleeping accommodation for six people, with a double berth in the bow cabin and two aft cabins, each with a double berth. The main salon has a U-shaped settee and a straight settee. The galley is located on the port side of the main salon. The galley is of straight configuration and is equipped with a three-burner stove, a refrigerator, freezer and a sink. A navigation station is located in the salon, on the starboard side. There are three heads, one for each cabin. Cabin headroom is 78 in (198 cm).

The design has a hull speed of 8.54 kn (15.82 km/h).

== Operational history ==
One review reported, "Yachting World's respected yacht tester Matthew Sheahan also mentions the shortage of winches, but he enjoyed his sail in a decent breeze. 'Once the Cyclades 43 is set up she sails well, is stiff, barrels along upwind at just under 7 knots and hits eight with ease on a reach,' he says. 'With a twin wheel system the 43 is rather heavy on the helm, but she remains an easy boat to steer in a straight line and responsive when you want to twist and turn over waves.'"

In a 2010 review, yacht broker Richard Jordan wrote, "the Cyclades 43 is absolutely not a bluewater boat. Other Beneteaus such as the Oceanis series are rated for offshore work. The Cyclades series is not. It is a great coastline sailor. She would be perfect to hop back and forth from the Bahamas and sail around the Caribbean."

== See also ==
- List of sailing boat types
