= Swan 57 RS =

Sailboat class

Development
- Designer: Germán Frers
- Location: Finland
- Year: 1996
- No. built: 10
- Builder: Oy Nautor AB
- Role: Cruiser
- Name: Swan 57 RS

Boat
- Displacement: 54,013 lb (24,500 kg)
- Draft: 7.55 ft (2.30 m)

Hull
- Type: monohull
- Construction: glassfibre
- LOA: 57.38 ft (17.49 m)
- LWL: 44.52 ft (13.57 m)
- Beam: 15.91 ft (4.85 m)
- Engine: Perkins Engines 125 hp (93 kW) diesel engine

Hull appendages
- Keel: Fin keel
- Ballast: 20,348 lb (9,230 kg)
- Rudder: Spade-type rudder

Rig
- Rig type: Bermuda rig
- I foretriangle height: 69.39 ft (21.15 m)
- J foretriangle base: 20.67 ft (6.30 m)
- P mainsail luff: 61.22 ft (18.66 m)
- E mainsail foot: 20.67 ft (6.30 m)

Sails
- Sailplan: Masthead sloop
- Mainsail area: 632.71 sq ft (58.781 m^{2})
- Jib/genoa area: 717.15 sq ft (66.625 m^{2})
- Total sail area: 1,349.86 sq ft (125.406 m^{2})

Racing
- PHRF: 42-45

The Swan 57 RS (Raised Salon) is a Finnish sailboat that was designed by Germán Frers as a cruiser and first built in 1996.

The design is sometimes confused with the unrelated 1977 Sparkman & Stephens Swan 57 or the 1990 Swan 57CC Frers designs.

== Production ==
The design was built by Oy Nautor AB in Finland, from 1996 until 2001, with ten boats completed, but it is now out of production.

== Design ==
The Swan 57 RS is a recreational keelboat, built predominantly of glassfibre, with wood trim. It has a masthead sloop rig with three sets of spreaders, a raked stem, a reverse transom, an internally mounted spade-type rudder controlled by a wheel and a fixed fin keel or optional stub keel and centreboard. It has a raised salon coach house to provide additional light and headroom below decks. It displaces 54,013 lb (24,500 kg) and carries 20,348 lb (9,230 kg) of ballast.

The boat has a draft of 7.55 ft (2.30 m) with the standard fin keel.

The boat is fitted with a British Perkins Engines diesel engine of 125 hp (93 kW) for docking and manoeuvring. The fuel tank holds 277 U.S. gallons (1,050 L; 231 imp gal) and the fresh water tank has a capacity of 272 U.S. gallons (1,030 L; 226 imp gal).

The design was built with several different interior layouts. Typical is one that has sleeping accommodation for six people, with a double "V"-berth in the bow cabin, a forward cabin with two bunk beds, a U-shaped settee in the main cabin and an aft cabin with a central double island berth. The galley is located on the starboard side abeam the companionway ladder. The galley is L-shaped and is equipped with a four-burner stove, an ice box and a sink. A navigation station is forward of the galley, on the starboard side. There are two heads, one amidships on the starboard side and one on the port side in the aft cabin.

The design has a hull speed of 8.94 kn (16.56 km/h) and a PHRF handicap of 42 to 45.

== Operational history ==
In a 2000 boats.com design review, naval architect Robert Perry wrote, "this new 57-footer from Nautor began life as a German Frers 55-footer. I think it is pretty clear, looking at the drawings, that the stern was pulled out. Still, the elegance is there, and the sheer has not suffered with the extended stern. Oftentimes the entire balance of the sheerline is thrown off when the stern is extended. We would have to look long and hard to find an ugly Swan, but the new Swan 57RS does break from the accepted Swan wedge-type deck."

== See also ==
- List of sailing boat types
