= TS Vanadis =

Turbine-powered steam yacht

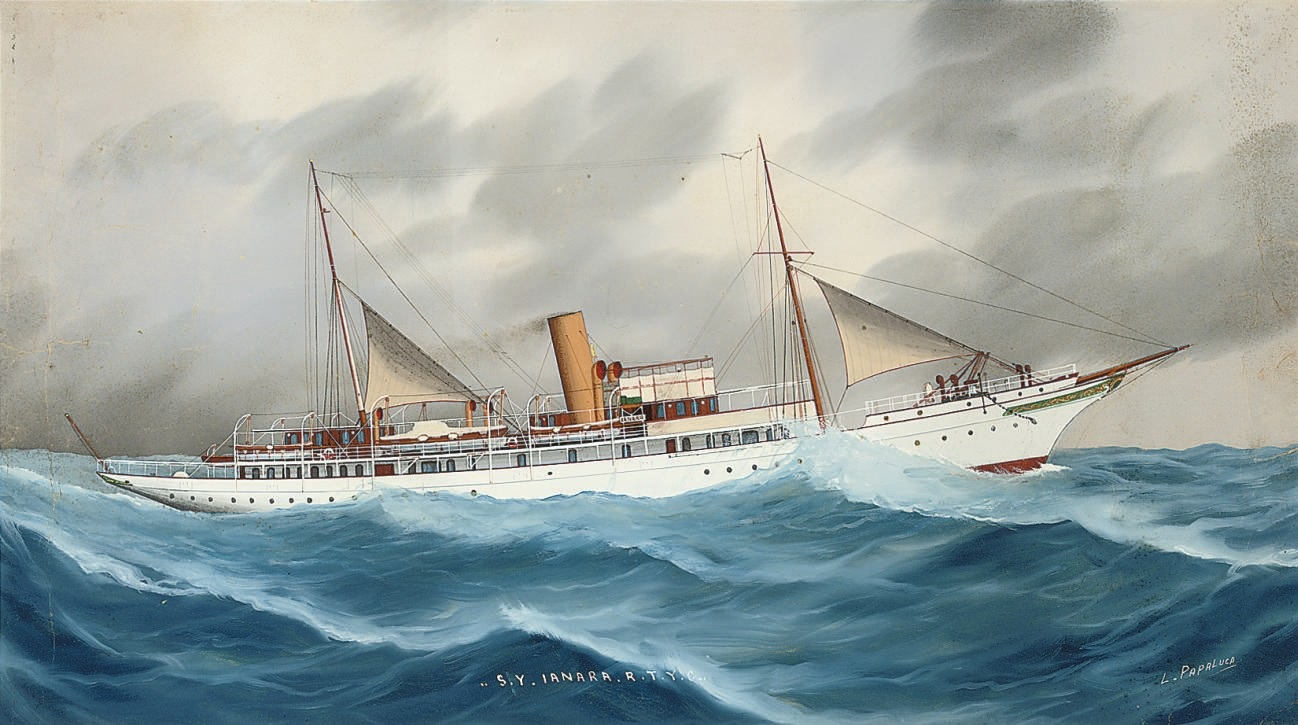
- The yacht as Ianara, in a painting by Luca Papaluca

History
- Name: 1908: Vanadis; 1917: Poryv; 1919: Finlandia; 1925: Ianara
- Namesake: 1908: another name for Freyja
- Owner: 1908: C. K. G. Billings; 1915: Morton F. Plant; 1919: Hjalmar Linder; 1922: Virginie Hériot; 1925: M Grahame-White; 1936: Balla & Vervleot SA
- Operator: 1917: (Russia) Russian Navy
- Port of registry: 1908: (United States) New York; 1919: (Finland) Helsinki; 1922: (France) Le Havre; 1926: (United Kingdom) Cowes; 1936: (Kingdom of Italy) Genoa
- Builder: A. & J. Inglis, Glasgow
- Yard number: 284
- Launched: 23 January 1908
- Completed: May 1908
- Identification: 1911: code letters KWSH; 1913: call sign KYT; 1916: call sign WEF; 1922: code letters OXWA; 1926: UK number 128189; 1926: code letters KVPC; 1930: call sign GKYL
- Fate: Scrapped, 1936

General characteristics
- Type: steam yacht
- Tonnage: 1,092 GRT, 516 NRT
- Displacement: 1,450 tons
- Length: 277 ft 6 in (84.6 m) overall; 249.45 ft (76.03 m) registered
- Beam: 32.7 ft (10.0 m)
- Draught: 14 ft (4.3 m)
- Depth: 18.7 ft (5.7 m)
- Installed power: 1908: 455 NHP; 1911: 432 NHP; 1922: 386 NHP
- Propulsion: 3 × screws; 1908: 3 × steam turbines; 1910: 2 × steam turbines; 1 × triple-expansion engine
- Sail plan: two-masted schooner
- Speed: 1908: 16 1/2 knots (31 km/h) maximum; 13 knots (24 km/h) cruising
- Range: 1908: 2,750 nautical miles (5,090 km) at 13 knots; 1910: 4,000 nautical miles (7,400 km) at 13 knots
- Sensors & processing systems: by 1911: submarine signalling

TS Vanadis was a steel-hulled steam yacht that was launched in Scotland in 1908. When new, she was said to be one of the largest steam yachts in the World. She was renamed Poryv in 1917, Finlandia in 1919, and Ianara in 1925. She was one of very few steam yachts propelled by direct-drive steam turbines instead of reciprocating engines. In 1910 her high-pressure turbine was replaced with a triple-expansion engine, in order to reduce her excessive coal consumption. She was owned in the United States until 1917, when she became a ship of the Imperial Russian Navy. After the First World War, she passed through a succession of Finnish, French, and United Kingdom owners. She was scrapped in Italy in 1936.

== Building ==
Clinton H Crane, of Tams, Lemoine and Crane in the United States, designed the yacht for the US businessman and harness racing promoter C. K. G. Billings. A. & J. Inglis of Glasgow built her as yard number 284, overseen by George L Watson & Co. She was launched on 23 January 1908, and completed that May. Her lengths were 277 ft 6 in (84.6 m) overall and 249.45 ft (76.03 m) registered. Her beam was 32.7 ft (10.0 m), her depth was 18.7 ft (5.7 m), and her draught was 14 ft (4.3 m). Her tonnages were 1,092 GRT, 516 NRT, and 1,450 tons displacement. Her hull was divided by eight watertight bulkheads, and had a double bottom.

Vanadis had two cabins and two bathrooms for her owners, and eight staterooms and six bathrooms for guests. Quarters for her deck officers and crew were forward; those for her engineer officers and stokers were amidships either side of her engine room; and those for her stewards were extreme aft. Her dining saloon was 22 by 18 feet (6.7 by 5.5 m); she had a drawing room with a fireplace; and also a smoking room. She had forced draught ventilation, with enough power and capacity to change all the air in her interior in ten minutes. When she was built, she was the only steam yacht to have an electric elevator. It served her upper deck, her staterooms, and the storerooms in her hold, enabling it to carry either passengers or luggage.

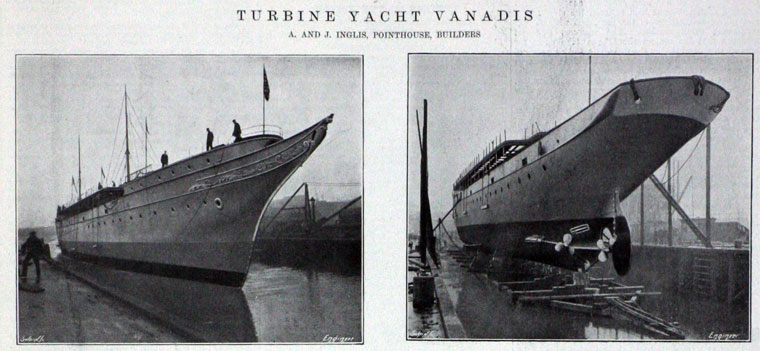
Bow and stern views of Vanadis being built in A. & J. Inglis' Pointhouse shipyard in Glasgow. The stern view shows her triple screws.

She had three screws, each driven by a Parsons steam turbine. A high-pressure turbine drove her middle screw. Exhaust steam from the high-pressure turbine drove a pair of low-pressure turbines, which drove her port and starboard screws. As was in the first decade of the 20th century, the propeller shafts ran at the same speed as the turbines, without reduction gearing. The combined power of her three turbines was rated at 455 NHP. In sea trials in Scotland, she achieved 16 1/2 knots (31 km/h).

Vanadis carried two motorboats, also built by Inglis. One was for the Billings family to use, and was guaranteed to make 17 knots (31 km/h). The other was a lifeboat, and was guaranteed to make 20 knots (37 km/h). She was only the third turbine-powered steam yacht to join the New York Yacht Club. The others were W. K. Vanderbilt, Jr's Tarantula, and George Jay Gould's Atalanta.

== Registration and identification ==
Vanadis was registered in New York. By 1911 her code letters were KWSH, and she was equipped with submarine signalling. By 1913 she was equipped with wireless telegraphy, and her call sign was KYT. By 1916 her call sign had been changed to WEF, but the Annual List of Merchant Vessels of the United States gave her old call sign in one list, and her new call sign in another.

== Reducing fuel consumption ==
Billings stipulated in his contract with Inglis that Vanadis must have a top speed of at least 15 1/2 knots (29 km/h). Early turbine steamers had direct drive turbines, without reduction gearing. As a result, they consumed more fuel than comparable yachts with reciprocating steam engines. Billings wanted Vanadis to be able to steam from New York to Southampton at 13 knots (24 km/h), or Marseille at 11 knots (20 km/h), without stopping for bunkers. In his contract he therefore stipulated that at 13 knots, she must not consume more than 26 tons of coal in 24 hours. However, after she was delivered to the US, her coal consumption at 13 knots was at least 34 tons of coal in 24 hours.

In 1909 Crane, her designer, ran a series of sea trials on Vanadis off Glen Cove, New York and Provincetown, Massachusetts. He identified three options: lengthen the yacht to enlarge her bunkers; remove all three turbines and replace them with two reciprocating engines; or remove the high-pressure turbine and replace it with one reciprocating engine.

The third option was a form of what was called "combination machinery". This system had been pioneered in 1908 by William Denny and Brothers in the refrigerated cargo ship Otaki, and by Harland & Wolff in the ocean liner Laurentic. However, the Otaki and Laurentic each had two reciprocating engines driving the port and starboard screws, and one turbine driving the middle screw. Crane's proposal was the opposite: one reciprocating engine driving the centre screw, and producing enough exhaust steam to drive two low-pressure turbines.

By April 1909, the third option had been chosen. The Staten Island Shipbuilding Company in New York removed the high-pressure turbine, replaced it with a three-cylinder triple-expansion engine, and completed the conversion in January 1910. Crane had the steam supply arranged so that the engines could be run in four combinations. The reciprocating engine could be run alone, with the turbines out of action. The turbines could be run with steam direct from the boilers, and the reciprocating engine out of action. All three engines could be run on steam direct from the boilers. Or the turbines could be run on exhaust steam from the reciprocating engine.

The conversion reduced the combined power of Vanadis' engines to 432 NHP, and reduced her top speed to 15 1/2 knots. However, when Crane tested her on 14–15 July 1910, on a 24-hour run at 13 knots from Provincetown to New London, Connecticut, her coal consumption was now only 23.47 tons in 24 hours.

== Collision with Bunker Hill ==
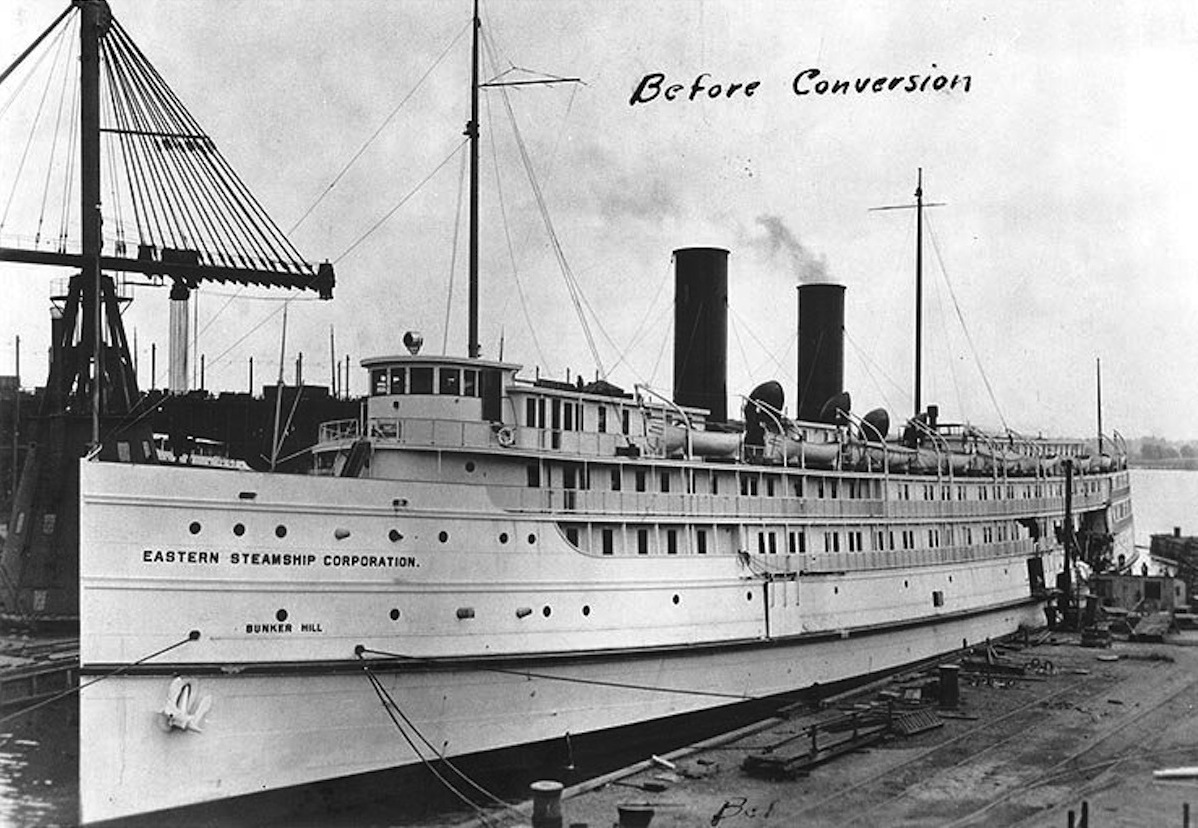
Bunker Hill in 1911

On 13 June 1915, Vanadis accidentally rammed Eastern Steamship Lines' 4,779 GRT passenger ship Bunker Hill in dense fog off Eaton's Neck in Long Island Sound. Bunker Hill was on her scheduled run from New York to Boston, carrying about 250 passengers and 130 crew. Vanadis had sailed from Glen Cove, where the Billings had a home, and was carrying Mr and Mrs Billings, and Mrs Billings' father, Andrew MacLeish. Both ships were going slowly due to the fog. At about 19:15 hrs Vanadis sighted Bunker Hill ahead, and immediately reversed her engines, but too late to overcome her momentum and prevent a collision.

The yacht hit the passenger steamer's port side. Her bowsprit went through the ceiling of Bunker Hill's dining saloon, where about 70 passengers were dining. It pierced the deck above, wrecking about 20 passenger cabins. Most of the passengers who had booked cabins had not yet retired to them, and thus escaped injury. One passenger was in his cabin, and was severely injured. He was rescued from his cabin, but died at about 20:15 hrs. One member of Bunker Hill's crew was injured and fell overboard. Four other passengers were injured. One of these had chest injuries and a broken leg, and was hospitalized. Passengers reported that Vanadis fell back, and then thrust into Bunker Hill a second time.

The passenger ship lowered two lifeboats. The crew of one of these rescued the injured crewman who had fallen overboard. Both of his legs were broken; he had a head injury; and he had been in the water for about ten minutes. He was taken aboard Vanadis, and put in Mr Billings' cabin, but died about an hour later. The yacht lost her bowsprit and much of her rigging; her bow was crumpled; and her foredeck was littered with débris from the passenger ship. However, neither ship was damaged below the waterline, and both remained afloat. Bunker Hill returned to New York, and Vanadis returned to Glen Cove.

In July 1915 the Coroner of New York City, Patrick Riordan, summoned Billings to testify at the inquest of the crewman who died aboard Vanadis. That September, Billings sold the yacht via yacht brokers Cox and Stevens to the financier Morton F. Plant.

== Changes of owner and name ==
In February 1917 it was reported that Plant had transferred Vanadis to the United Kingdom registry, and Russian interests wanted to buy her. The United States Shipping Board asked Plant not to sell her, but had no power to stop him. Her new owners renamed her Poryv, and she joined the Russian Arctic flotilla. That September there was a false report that a bunker explosion had sunk her in the North Atlantic on her way to Archangel.

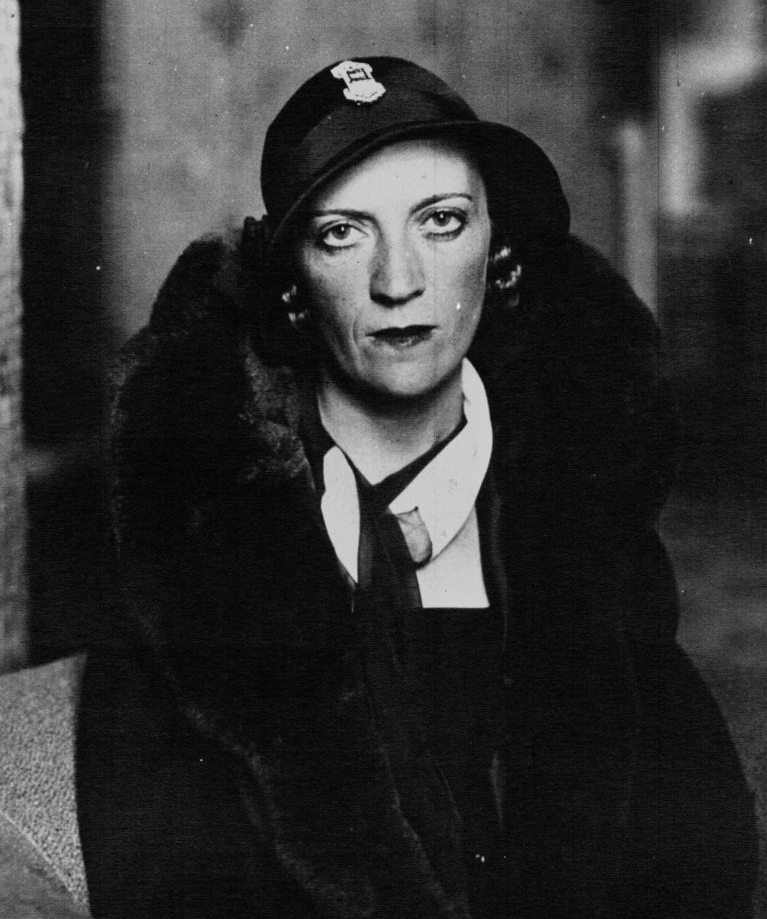
Virginie Hériot in 1931

By 1919 the Finnish nobleman Hjalmar Linder had acquired the yacht, renamed her Finlandia, and registered her in Helsinki. Linder died in Marseille in 1921. By 1922 the French yachtswoman Virginie Hériot had acquired Finlandia and registered her in Le Havre. Her code letters were OXWA, and the combined power of her engines was now rated at 386 NHP.

By 1925 Lieutenant Commander Montague Grahame-White, RNVR, acquired the yacht and renamed her Ianara. In 1926 he registered her in Cowes. Her UK official number was 128189 and her code letters were KVPC. By 1930 her call sign was GKYL, and by 1934 this had superseded her code letters.

By 1936 an Italian company called Balla & Vervleot SA had acquired Ianara for scrap. They registered her in Genoa, but by May 1936 she was recorded that she was in the process of being broken up.

== See also ==
- Emerald (steam yacht) – another steam yacht whose middle turbine was replaced with a triple expansion engine

== Bibliography ==
- Crane, Clinton Hoadley (1910). "Comparative results in steam and coal consumption with turbines, reciprocating engines and a combination of the two in the steam yacht Vanadis". Transactions. Society of Naval Architects and Marine Engineers: 157–194. Archived from the original on 16 January 2017.
- Mercantile Navy List. London. 1927 – via Crew List Index Project.
- Mercantile Navy List. London. 1930 – via Crew List Index Project.
- Register of Yachts. London: Lloyd's Register of Shipping. 1909 – via Internet Archive.
- Register of Yachts. London: Lloyd's Register of Shipping. 1911 – via Internet Archive.
- Register of Yachts. London: Lloyd's Register of Shipping. 1919 – via Internet Archive.
- Register of Yachts. London: Lloyd's Register of Shipping. 1922 – via Internet Archive.
- Register of Yachts. London: Lloyd's Register of Shipping. 1925 – via Internet Archive.
- Register of Yachts. London: Lloyd's Register of Shipping. 1936 – via Internet Archive.
- United States Department of Commerce (1913). Forth-Fifth Annual List of Merchant Vessels of the United States. Washington, DC: Government Printing Office – via HathiTrust.
- United States Department of Commerce (1916). Forth-Eighth Annual List of Merchant Vessels of the United States. Washington, DC: Government Printing Office – via HathiTrust.
