= Yacht broker =

A yacht broker is a specialist who serves yacht or boat sellers and/or buyers as a representative for the sale or purchase of a yacht or boat. The yacht broker is paid an agreed commission by the seller to market the yacht for sale, field interest and inquiries from buyers, handle negotiations, attend inspection and water trial and ultimately, if successful, to attend delivery. A buyer's broker may assist their client in locating and qualifying a vessel and assisting with purchase negotiations but is typically not paid a commission by buyer and instead shares in the commission paid by the seller to their broker. These two roles are referred to as listing broker (representing the seller and vessel) and selling broker (representing buyer).

There is a third, more specialist, type of broker. These represent the boat buyer, not the seller. These should be distinguished from other brokers who represent both buyers and sellers. The specialist broker - sometimes called the buyers representative - offer services such as boat search, boat negotiation and a variety of ancillary services such as assistance with documentation, transport, finding a suitable marine surveyor. The services offered are more akin to advisory, consultancy, technical, procurement and negotiation services, offered in a professional manner. They aim to get the buyer the best deal and most suitable boat.

== Licensing ==
Yacht brokers are required to be licensed and bonded in only two states (Florida and California) to protect the public; however, the rules differ in each state on what qualifies as a "yacht".

In Florida, licensing is required for any vessel greater than 32 feet in fixed length (often called length overall or LOA) that is not your own. In order to participate in the sale of a vessel of this size in Florida, a person must submit a bond of $10,000 to the state of Florida, go through a criminal background check, including submitting fingerprint cards and hold a valid license with the Florida Department of Business and Professional Regulation (often called DBPR) for 2 years as a sales person, before being eligible to become a broker in their own right. This requires a surety bond of $25,000 and allows someone to set up their own yacht brokerage company or become "broker of record" for someone else's company. There is only one "broker of record" per company; this is the person who is responsible for overseeing all other sales peoples yacht sales activity and is responsible for reporting sales to the State of Florida.

In California, licensing is required for any vessel greater than 16 feet in fixed length (often called length overall or LOA), but under 300 G.R.T. (gross registered tons) that is not your own. In order to participate in the sale of a vessel of this size in California, a person must submit a bond of $10,000 to the state of California and hold a valid license with the California Division of Boating and Waterways (often called DBW). Similar to Florida, you have to hold a sales person license for 2 years before applying to become a broker. California is the only state which actually requires prospective sales people and brokers sit a 2-hour written test, which has a pass rate of 70%.

== Qualifications ==
Yacht brokers in the Commonwealth and other English-speaking yacht brokers outside the U.S.A. may qualify to earn their Certified Professional Yacht Broker (CPYB) credentials, following on-line courses of study and tests, leading to 4 1-hour examinations conducted online by C.P.Y.B. International. C.P.Y.B. International is provided by Associated Yacht Brokers, A.Y.B.

In the Netherlands, qualified yacht brokers are known as "EMCI Certified Yachtbrokers"

In the U.S. and Canada, qualified yacht brokers may qualify to earn their Certified Professional Yacht Broker (CPYB) credentials, following courses of study and successfully completing a 3-hour written examination. The CPYB program is supported and offered by all seven yacht broker associations in North America; YBAA, FYBA, NYBA, GCYBA, CYBA, OYBA and BCYBA.

== Associations ==
AYB - Associated Yacht Brokers, EMCI - European Maritime Certification Institute, YBAA - Yacht Brokers Association of America, FYBA - Florida Yacht Brokers Association, MYBA - Worldwide Yacht Brokers Association, BCYBA -British Columbia Yacht Brokers Association, GCYBA- Gulf Coast Yacht Brokers Association, CYBA - California Yacht Brokers Association, OYBA - Ontario Yacht Brokers Association (Boating Ontario), CPYB - Certified Professional Yacht Broker Program.

== Locations ==
Yacht brokers are more common where yachting is more common; along coasts and waterways or within lakes. For instance, yachting is very common in the Mediterranean and Caribbean Seas, along the U.S eastern and western and gulf coasts. These popular waterways for leisure boating are proximate to the large western populations of Europe and all of North America.

== Commission ==
Similar to other industries (i.e. real estate) commission is usually paid by the seller of the vessel to a broker and agreed upon in advance of negotiation, typically as a key term in a marketing agreement, which is often called a Central (or Open) Marketing Agreement. Commission is either based on a fixed bottom line from the seller (Net) or as a percentage of the purchase price (Percentage). When commission is as a Percentage, it is typically 10% of the purchase price. Net agreements are becoming increasingly unpopular and are very rarely offered by Listing Brokers at the present time. While they may seem an attractive option for sellers and do work well for sellers in limited scenarios, they are typically only offered when the broker is planning to make more than the standard 10% as their commission or, if less, it is unlikely another broker will want to bring a buyer to negotiation and share in a commission which is less than the standard and expected amount.

While standard commission rate is typically 10%, there are brokerages that offer to market and sell vessels for less. Reduced commissions however often have the unintended effect of alienating Buyers Brokers who would otherwise alert a potential buyer to the vessel.

While not common in the United States, it is not common in some countries (especially in Europe) for buyers to pay a "buyer's commission" to their chosen broker to find a vessel for the buyer.

== Yacht charter broker ==
The term 'yacht broker' can sometimes be confused with the term 'yacht charter broker'. A yacht broker acts as an agent in the sale of yachts, rather than the "rent", hire or charter time on yachts. A yacht charter broker specializes in the "charter" of fully crewed luxury yachts or smaller bare-boat yachts used by people for holidays/vacations . Occasionally a person will carry out both roles but more commonly a company as a whole will carry out both roles and employ both yacht charter brokers and yacht brokers. The roles are therefore normally specialised and distinguished.

== See also ==
- Yacht charter broker
- Yacht charter
- List of motor yachts by length
- Bareboat charter
- Luxury yacht
