= Lindsay May =

Australian competitive sailor

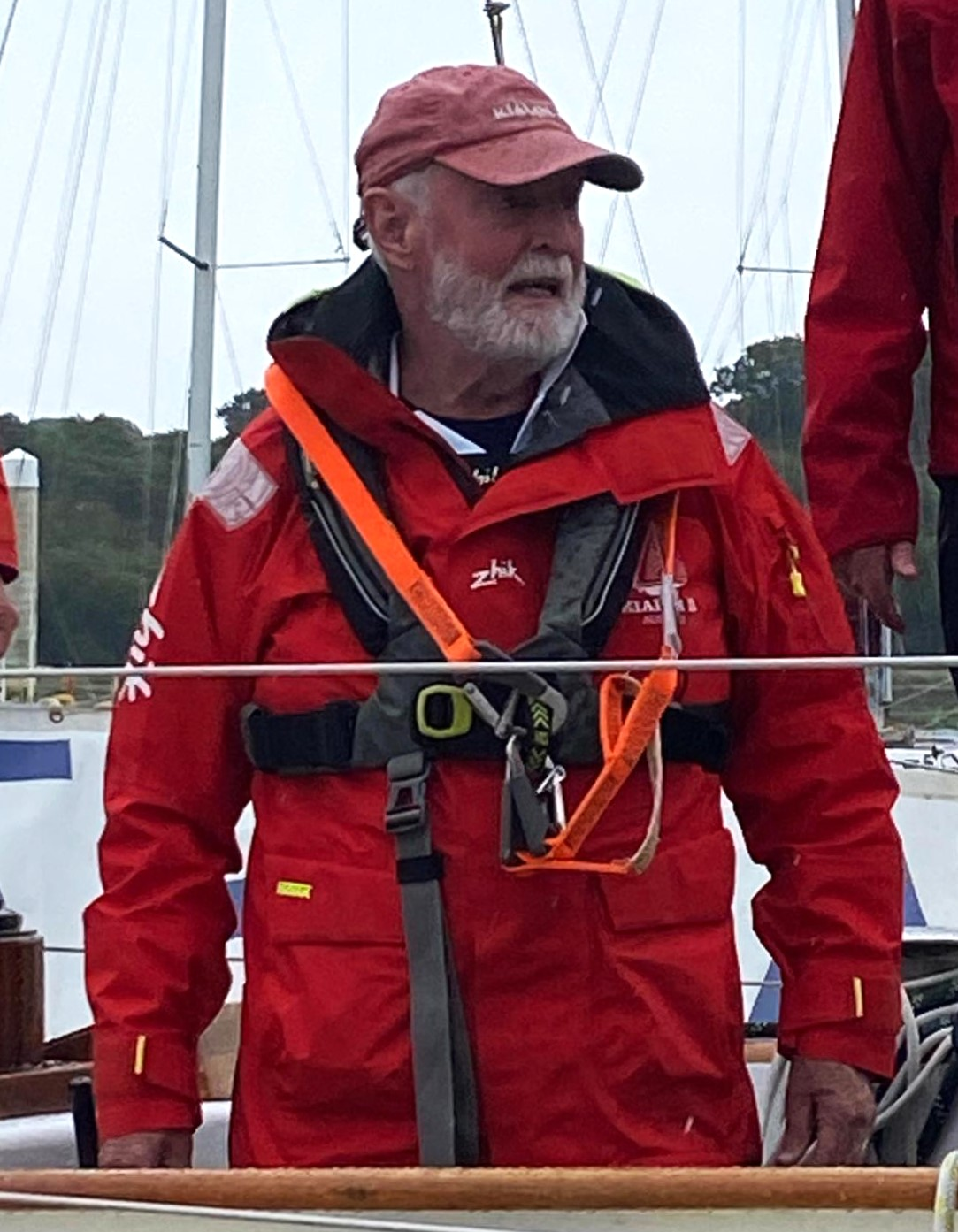
- May at the 2023 Rolex Fastnet Race

Personal information
- Full name: Lindsay Bruce May

Sailing career
- Sport: Sailing

Lindsay Bruce May is an Australian sailor, known for his achievements in offshore yacht racing. Those including three overall wins and one Line Honours win in the Sydney to Hobart Yacht Race, as well as holding the record for the most consecutive races sailed.

== Life ==
As an offshore sailor and navigator, May has sailed in many notable regattas and races including the Admirals Cup, World 8 Metre Championships, Sydney to Hobart Race, Fastnet Race, China Sea Race, Transpac Race and the Newport to Bermuda Race.

== Sydney to Hobart Yacht Race ==
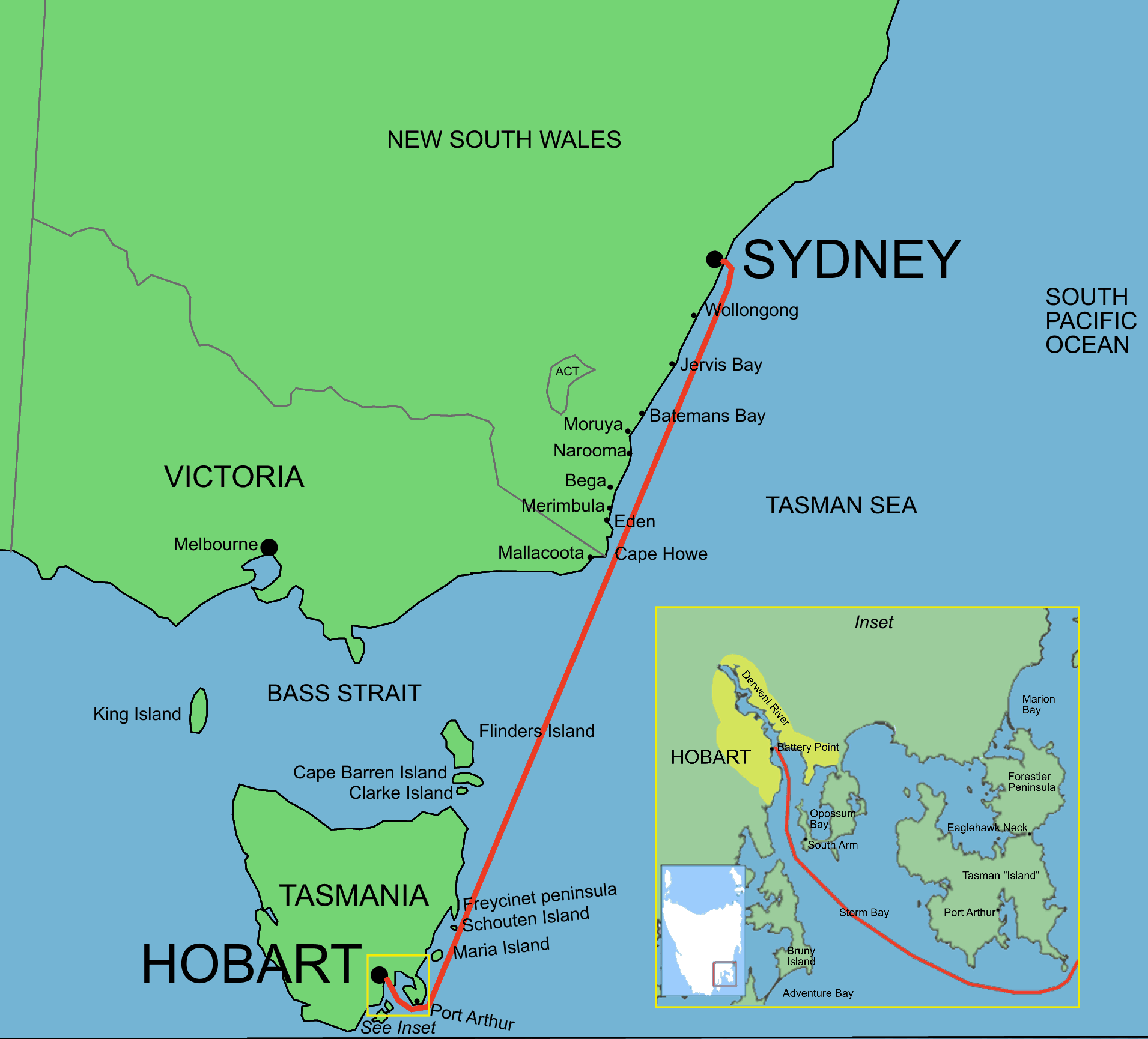
The Sydney to Hobart Yacht Race Route

In the Sydney to Hobart Yacht Race, May is regarded as one of the veterans of the race having won line honours and been an overall winner of the prestigious race three times. May sailed his first race in 1973 and has completed a record 50 consecutive races between 1973 & 2023. As a well regarded figure, May has written, contributed or been featured in many media articles including The New York Times.

In the 1993 race, May was aboard the yacht Atara that rescued sailor John Quinn who had been washed overboard and spent nearly 6 hours in the Tasman Sea.

In 2006, May skippered Simon Kurts' 1973 Sparkman & Stevens S&S 47 Love & War to victory as overall winner. This win equalled the overall record for a yacht with Love & War becoming only the second yacht to win the race three times (1974, 1978 and 2006).

== Recognition ==
In May 2007, Seahorse International Yachting Magazine introduced May in to their Hall of Fame as Sailor of the Month, recognising his victory in the 2006 race.

In 2017, May was awarded an Order of Australia Medal for service to sailing, and to health and social welfare groups in the 2017 Australia Day Honours

== Notable races ==
In the Sydney to Hobart Yacht Race May has achieved 3 Overall Wins on Handicap and 1 Line Honours Win.

Year	Title	Victory	Vessel	Position
1984	Sydney to Hobart Yacht Race	Overall Winner	Indian Pacific	Navigator
1991	Sydney to Hobart Yacht Race	Overall Winner	Atara	Navigator
1997	Sydney to Hobart Yacht Race	Line Honours	Brindabella	Navigator
2006	Sydney to Hobart Yacht Race	Overall Winner	Love & War	Skipper & Navigator

== Sydney to Hobart Race - Individual Results ==
At the completion of the 2023 Sydney to Hobart Race May became the first sailor to compete in 50 consecutive Sydney to Hobart Races having sailed on Antipodes in his 50th race.

Year	Yacht	Handicap Placing	Line Honours Placing	Notes
1973	Onya of Gosford	23rd	25th	
1974	Onya of Gosford	39th	53rd	
1975	Dancing Mouse	13th	67th	
1976	Geronimo	24th	11th	
1977	Geronimo	Retired		
1978	Deception	8th	8th	
1979	Deception	39th	34th	
1980	Adrenalin	18th	18th	
1981	Once More Dear Friends	22nd	11th	
1982	Once More Dear Friends	7th	31st	
1983	Once More Dear Friends	2nd	30th	
1984	Indian Pacific	1st	4th	
1985	Another Concubine	13th	35th	
1986	Szechwan	5th (IOR)	23rd	
1987	Phoenix Contractors	43rd (IOR)	49th	
1988	Madelines Daughter	Retired		
1989	Madelines Daughter	5th (IOR)	11th	
1990	Madelines Daughter	Retired		
1991	Atara	1st (IOR)	11th	
1992	Atara	3rd (IOR)	16th	
1993	Atara	Retired		
1994	Brindabella	18th (IMS)	2nd	
1995	Brindabella	30th (IMS)	2nd	
1996	Brindabella	Retired		
1997	Brindabella	9th (IMS)	1st	
1998	Brindabella	9th (IMS)	2nd	
1999	Brindabella	2nd (IMS)	2nd	
2000	Brindabella	Retired		
2001	Brindabella	13th (IMS)	7th	
2002	Brindabella	27th (IMS) 31st (IRC)	6th	
2003	Love & War	12th (IMS)	41st	
2004	Love & War	7th (IRC)	24th	
2005	Conergy	Retired		
2006	Love & War	1st (IRC)	32nd	
2007	Swan Song	32nd (IRC)	35th	
2008	ASM Shockwave 5	10th (IRC)	4th	
2009	Love & War	24th (IRC)	71st	
2010	Brindabella	Retired		
2011	Strewth	30th (IRC)	16th	
2012	Love & War	15th (IRC)	54th	
2013	Brindabella	8th (PHS)	17th	
2014	Love & War	7th (IRC)	74th	
2015	Brindabella	Retired		
2016	Love & War	15th (IRC)	61st	
2017	Kialoa II	56th (IRC)	68th	
2018	Kialoa II	38th (IRC)	35th	
2019	Love & War	64th (IRC)	108th	
2020	Race cancelled due to the COVID-19 pandemic.			
2021	Kialoa II	Retired		
2022	Kialoa II	44th (IRC)	34th	
2023	Antipodes	39th (IRC)	13th	
