= 1998 Sydney to Hobart Yacht Race =

1998 annual yacht race in Australia

Coordinates: 38°0′S 150°30′E

54th Sydney to Hobart Yacht Race

Event information
- Type: Yacht
- Dates: 26 December 1998 – 3 January 1999
- Sponsor: Telstra
- Host city: Sydney, Hobart
- Boats: 115
- Distance: 628 nautical miles (1,163 km)
- Website: Rolex Sydney Hobart

Results
- Winner (1998): Sayonara (Larry Ellison)

Succession
- Previous: Brindabella (George Snow) in 1997
- Next: Nokia (Stefan Myralf & Michael Spies) in 1999

The 1998 Sydney to Hobart Yacht Race was the 54th annual running of the "blue water classic" Sydney to Hobart Yacht Race. It was hosted by the Cruising Yacht Club of Australia based in Sydney, New South Wales. It was the most disastrous in the race's history, with the loss of six lives and five yachts in an unexpectedly severe storm on 27–28 December. Fifty-five sailors were rescued in the largest peacetime search and rescue effort ever seen in Australia.

== Background ==
The Sydney to Hobart Yacht Race is an annual event hosted by the Cruising Yacht Club of Australia, starting in Sydney, New South Wales on Boxing Day then heading south through the Tasman Sea, past Bass Strait, into Storm Bay and up the Derwent River, to cross the finish line in Hobart, Tasmania. The race distance is approximately 630 nautical miles (1,170 km; 720 mi).

The race is run in co-operation with the Royal Yacht Club of Tasmania, and is widely considered to be one of the most difficult yacht races in the world.

== 1998 race ==
The 1998 race, like every other edition, began on Sydney Harbour, at noon on Boxing Day (26 December 1998), with 115 starters heading south. The yachts ranged in size from the 24.1-metre (79 ft 1 in) Sayonara to the 10.1-metre (33 ft 2 in) Berrimilla. A favourable current running south at 4 knots (7.4 km/h; 4.6 mph) with strengthening north-to-northeasterly winds of generally 25–35 knots (46–65 km/h; 29–40 mph) prevailing off the New South Wales southern coast allowed a record-breaking dash south down the Australian East Coast. By early morning on 27 December, the lead yachts entered Bass Strait and began to encounter winds in excess of 40 knots (74 km/h; 46 mph). Of the 115 boats which started, 71 retired and 44 yachts completed the race.

Outright victory went to Sayonara, owned and skippered by Larry Ellison, with Lachlan Murdoch amongst the crew. The 35-foot (10.7 m) AFR Midnight Rambler, skippered by Ed Psaltis, won on handicap. Never before had a boat of its size reached the entry to Bass Strait in less than a day.

== Storm and rescue ==
On the second day of the race (27 December), unexpectedly severe weather conditions struck the fleet off the coast of south-eastern Australia. An unusually intense low-pressure depression developed, which resulted in unseasonal mid-summer snow across parts of south-eastern Australia. The weather system built into an exceptionally strong storm with sustained winds in excess of 65 knots (+33 m/s, +118 km/h, +73 mph, Force 12), gusts to 80 knots, and maximum wave heights of 15 metres (50 ft). The rising storm caused the abandonment of seven boats, five of which sank; 55 sailors had to be rescued from their yachts or life-rafts by ships and helicopters. Overall, the rescue efforts involved 35 military and civilian aircraft and 27 Royal Australian Navy vessels. It proved to be Australia's largest-ever peacetime rescue operation.

== Deaths ==
The six sailors who died were: Phillip Charles Skeggs (Business Post Naiad, drowned, 27 December 1998); Bruce Raymond Guy (Business Post Naiad, heart attack, 27 December 1998); John Dean, James Lawler and Michael Bannister (Winston Churchill, all drowned, 28 December 1998); and Glyn Charles (Sword of Orion, drowned, 27 December 1998).

== Aftermath ==
=== CYCA report ===
On 1 June 1999, the Cruising Yacht Club of Australia released the Report, Findings and Recommendations of the 1998 Sydney to Hobart Race Review Committee. The report listed a multitude of safety recommendations and resulted in changes both for future Sydney to Hobart races and for yachting events worldwide.

=== Coroner's inquest ===
A coroner's inquest into the deaths was critical of both the race management at the time and the Bureau of Meteorology.

The results of the inquest were released on 12 December 2000, NSW coroner John Abernethy finding that the Cruising Yacht Club of Australia had "abdicated its responsibility to manage the race". He wrote: "From what I have read and heard, it is clear to me that during this crucial time the race management team played the role of observers rather than managers and that was simply not good enough." But he acknowledged the club's actions to upgrade safety precautions and sailor qualifications.

Abernethy also criticised the Bureau for making insufficient efforts to inform race officials of a dramatically worsened weather forecast about the severe storm developing south of Eden, when it was common public knowledge the race was scheduled to begin. As a remedial measure, he required the Bureau to add maximum wind gust speed and wave height to its forecasts.

The day after the coroner's findings, the club's race director, Phil Thompson, resigned his position. According to the coroner's report, "Mr Thompson's inability to appreciate the problems when they arose, and his inability to appreciate them at the time of giving his evidence causes me concern that Mr Thompson may not appreciate such problems if they arise in the future."

== 1998 fleet ==
The 115 yachts registered to begin the 1998 Sydney to Hobart Yacht race were:

Yacht Name	Nation	Owner / Skipper	Yacht Design	Launch Year	Result / Details
ABN AMRO Challenge		Ray Roberts	Iain Murray IMS Racer	1997	RETIRED (lost rudder, towed to Batemans Bay)
Adiago		Peter Williams	S&S 36	1989	RETIRED Bermagui, prudent seamanship
Aera	(United Kingdom)	Nick Lykiardopulo	Swan 46	1985	FINISHED 12 across the line, 1st CHS
AFR Midnight Rambler	(Australia)	Edward Psaltis / Bob Thomas	Hick 35	1994	FINISHED 10th across the line, 1st overall IMS & Division D
Alexander of Creswell	(Australia)	Royal Australian Navy / W. Hellwig	Swarbrick 111	1984	RETIRED sail damage
Allusive		John Smith	Lyons 48	1998	FINISHED 43rd across the line, problems with retractable keel
Antipodes Sydney	(Australia)	Geoff Hill	Taswell 56	1991	RETIRED Eden, prudent seamanship
Antuka		Raymond Semmens	Adams 13	1983	RETIRED prudent seamanship
Aspect Computing		D. Pescud	Radford 54	1989	FINISHED 9th across the line, 1st PMS Div A
Assassin		R. Crawford	Farr 40	1992	RETIRED, prudent seamanship
Atara		H. Cudmore / J. Storey	Lyons 43	1994	FINISHED 12th across the line, 4th IMS Division B
Aurora		Jim Holly	Farr 40		FINISHED 25th across the line, 2nd IMS Div C
Ausmaid		G. Gjergja	Farr 47	1994	FINISHED 3rd over the line, 1st IMS Div B
Avanti		Chris Mooney / John Mooney	First 38	1986	FINISHED 27th across the line, 2nd PHS Div A
B52		Wayne Miller	Bashford Howison 41	1995	RETIRED (rolled, lost mast, structural damage, motored to Eden)
Bacardi		P. Cole	Peterson 44	1978	FINISHED 19th across the line, 2nd IMS Div E
Berrimilla		Alex Whitworth	Brolga 33	1977	FINISHED 31st across the line, 1st PHS & Div B
Bin Rouge	(New Zealand)	D Hodgkinson / Christopher Bowling	Farr 31	1993	RETIRED (Eden, prudent seamanship)
Bobsled		P. White / G. Bush / N. Feros	Steinman		RETIRED sail damage
Boomaroo Morse Fans		J. McIntosh	S&S 34	1971	RETIRED prudent seamanship
Breakaway		K. McDonald	Swanson 36		FINISHED 40th across the line, 2nd IMS Div D
Bright Morning Star		Hugh Treharne / I. Treharne	Peterson 51	1985	RETIRED crew injuries
Brindabella	(Australia)	George Snow	Jutson 80	1994	FINISHED 2nd across the line, 2nd IMS Div A
Business Post Naiad	(Australia)	Bruce Guy†	Farr 40	1984	RETIRED (rolled twice, broke mast, major structural damage, two crew died, Abandoned)
Canon Maris	(Australia)	Ian Kiernan	Tasman Seabird	1958	RETIRED prudent seamanship
Challenge Again			Bashford 41	1995	FINISHED 24th across the line
Chutzpah			Sydney 38	1998	RETIRED prudent seamanship
Computerland			Inglis 47	1989	FINISHED 15th across the line
Cyclone			Germán Frers	1989	RETIRED Eden, hull damage
Dixie Chicken		Liz Wardley	Elliot 36	1993	RETIRED stood by Outlaw lost too much time to continue
Doctel Rager			Elliott 56	1987	FINISHED 13th across the line
Elysion Blue	(Italy)	Yvon Berrehar	Swan 68	1996	RETIRED prudent seamanship
Forzado		Geoff Phillips	Farr 1020		RETIRED prudent seamanship
Foxtel Titan Ford			Farr 50	1992	FINISHED 14th across the line, 3rd CHS
Fudge			Elliot 56	1989	FINISHED 6th across the line, 3rd PHS Div A
Gundy Grey		Robert Green	Adams 40	1986	RETIRED lost liferaft
Helsal II	(Australia)	Keith Flint	Joe Adams Pocket Maxi	1979	FINISHED 16th across the line
Henry Kendall Akubra			Farr 1220	1990	FINISHED 39th across the line
Hi Flyer	(Papua New Guinea)		First 40.7	1993	RETIRED
Hogsbreath Witchdoctor			Davidson 42	1979	RETIRED prudent seamanship
Impeccable			Doug Peterson	1980	RETIRED prudent seamanship
Indian Pacific			Davidson 36	1986	RETIRED prudent seamanship
Industrial Quest			Nelson Marek 43	1995	FINISHED 8th across the line, 3rd IMS Div B
Inner Circle			Farr 40 IOR		RETIRED prudent seamanship
Innkeeper			Steinman 66	1987	RETIRED equipment failure (engine)
Jack Guy			Northshore 38	1984	RETIRED prudent seamanship
Jubilation			Farr 11.6	1989	FINISHED 34th across the line, 3rd PHS Div B
Kendell			Dubois 38		FINISHED 32nd across the line
Kickatinalong			Adams 13	1980	RETIRED prudent seamanship
King Billy			King 38	1992	RETIRED taking water
Kingurra		Peter Joubert	Peter Joubert - one off	1972	RETIRED (knock-down past 120 degrees, MOB, crew injury, sailed to Eden)
Komatsu Blue Lady			Challenger 39	1989	FINISHED 38th across the line
Lady Penrhyn		Royal Australian Navy	Swarbrick 111	1984	RETIRED prudent seamanship
Liquid Asset			Duncanson 34	1996	FINISHED 42nd across the line
Loki			Swan 48	1997	RETIRED (knock-down beyond 120 degrees, cabin window broken, deployed sea anchor, sailed to Narooma)
Maglieri Wines			Jutson 43	1994	RETIRED rig damage
Marchioness			Lavranos Maxi	1992	RETIRED rig damage
Margaret Rintoul II			S&S 48	1968	FINISHED 17th across the line, 1st IMS Div E
Mark Twain			S&S 39	1971	FINISHED 33rd across the line
Mercedes IV			Kaufman 41	1973	FINISHED 23rd across the line, 3rd IMS Div E
Midnight Special		Peter Baynes	Tartan / Jarkan 40	1995	RETIRED (rolled, lost mast, major structural damage, abandoned, sunk)
Miintinta		Brian Emerson	Swanson 42	1975	RETIRED (hull damage, abandoned, sunk)
Mirrabooka			Frers 46	1987	FINISHED 21st across the line
Misty	(Australia)	Brian Clague	S&S 34	1975	FINISHED last boat in fleet of 44, 1st IMS Division F
Morning Tide		A Fenwick / J Davern	S&S 34	1974	RETIRED prudent seamanship
Nattel Adrenalin		David Bennett	Peterson 38		RETIRED prudent seamanship
New Horizons			Cavalier 37	1985	RETIRED equipment failure & rig damage
Ninety Seven			Farr 47	1993	RETIRED sail damage
Nokia			Farr 75 / VO 60		FINISHED 5th across the line
Not Negotiable	(Australia)	Michael Dolphin	UFO 34	1985	RETIRED Eden, prudent seamanship
Nouméa	(New Caledonia)		Young 11		FINISHED 37th across the line, 3rd IMS Div D
Ocean Designs	(Australia)	S. Bean	Bashford / Howison 41	1995	RETIRED Eden, prudent seamanship
Outlaw	(Australia)	Alan Quick	Sayer 44	1986	RETIRED Bermagui, structural damage, forward frames
Pippin			Farr 37	1984	RETIRED (knock-down beyond 110 degrees, window popped out, sailed to Eden)
Polaris			Cole 43	1970	FINISHED 30th across the line
Quest			Nelson / Marek 46	1997	FINISHED 7th across the line
Ragamuffin			Farr 50	1995	FINISHED 4th across the line, 2nd IMS Div B
Rapscallion Team Syntegra	(Australia)	Dick Voorderhake	Lyons 40	1993	FINISHED 28th across the line
Red Jacket			Radford 12.2	1995	RETIRED rig damage
Relish IV			Elan 43	1989	RETIRED crew injury
Renegade			Ron Holland 40	1981	RETIRED (rolled, sailed to Eden)
Ruff 'N Tumble			Cole 43	1983	RETIRED equipment failure
Sagacious			Farr 40	1987	RETIRED equipment failure
Sayonara	(United States)	Larry Ellison/Chris Dickson	ILC Maxi	1995	FINISHED 1st across the line, 1st IMS Div A
Sea Jay			Sydney 41	1996	RETIRED prudent seamanship
Secret Men's Business			Murray 42	1996	RETIRED Eden, prudent seamanship
(Sharp) Hawk 5	(United Kingdom)	Nigel Bramwell	Sydney 40	1998	RETIRED crew injuries
She II			Olsen 40		RETIRED equipment failure (steering chain)
She's Apples Two			Jarkan 12.5	1991	FINISHED 29th across the line
Siena			Northshore 38	1983	RETIRED Bermaguri, rendered assistance to VCOS, crew injured
Sledghammer			Sydney 40	1998	RETIRED equipment failure (steering chain)
Solo Globe Challenger		Tony Mowbray	Cole 43	1984	RETIRED (rolled to 135 degrees, lost mast, flooded)
Southerly		Don Mickelborough	Peel 35	1939	RETIRED Eden, prudent seamanship, Oldest yacht in the fleet
Spirit of Downunder			Cameron / de Lange 12m	1997	FINISHED 22nd across the line
Sword of Orion	(Australia)	Rob Kothe	Reichel-Pugh 44	1993	RETIRED (Rolled, MOB (died), crew injured, major structural damage, abandoned, sunk)
Sydney			Sydney 60	1996	RETIRED rudder damage
T42 Solandra	(Australia)	Craig Vescott	S&S 34	1982	RETIRED Eden lost mast
Tartan	(Australia)	Mark Ballard	Northshore 38	1984	RETIRED Eden, prudent seamanship
Team Jaguar Infinity			Farr 65	1989	RETIRED (dismasted, structural damage, towed to Eden)
Tenacious			Defiance / S&S 30	1979	RETIRED equipment failure (engine)
Terra Firma			Murray 41	1995	RETIRED prudent seamanship
Tilting at Windmills			Peter Joubert / John Dory	1994	FINISHED 26th across the line, 2nd CHS
Trust Bank Hummingbird			Farr 37	1985	RETIRED Eden, prudent seamanship
Unipro Ocean Road	(Australia)	K. Simpson	Adams 45	1988	FINISHED 41st across the line
Vagrant		Arch Waters	Magpie 34	1988	RETIRED crew injury
Valheru	(Australia)	Anthony Lyall	Elliott 50	1994	FINISHED 18th over the line, 3rd IMS Division C
VC Offshore Stand Aside	(Australia)	James Hallion	Young 12m	1990	RETIRED (rolled, lost mast, windows & coach roof, MOBs, crew injured, abandoned, sunk)
Veto	(Australia)	Max Crisp, Mike Crisp, Graham Brown	Robert Salthouse	1979	RETIRED, returned to Sydney, equipment failure & rig damage
Waitangi II			Jarkan 10	1989	FINISHED 35th across the line, 2nd PHS Div B
Wide Load			Swarbrick 40	1993	RETIRED equipment failure (radio)
Wild One	(Australia)	Co-owner Barry Main	Inglis 47		FINISHED 36th across the line, PHS All 16th, Div A 10th
Wild Thing	(Australia)		Ian Murray 70 Maxi	1998	RETIRED rig damage
Winston Churchill	(Australia)	Richard Winning	Cloverdale 51	1942	RETIRED (knocked down beyond 90 degrees, major structural damage, abandoned, sunk) (3 crew later lost from liferaft & died)
Yendys			Beneteau 53f5	1991	FINISHED 11th across the line, 1st IMS Div C
Zeus II			Joubert / Currawong 30	1979	RETIRED lost mast

== Results ==
=== Line Honours results (Top 10) ===
Position	Sail Number	Yacht	State/Country	Yacht Type	LOA (Metres)	Skipper	Elapsed Time d:hh:mm:ss	Ref
1	US 17	Sayonara	United States	Farr ILC Maxi	23.80	Larry Ellison	2:19:03:32	
2	C1	Brindabella	New South Wales	Jutson 75	22.85	George Snow	2:21:55:06	
3	YC 1000	Ausmaid	South Australia	Farr 47	14.24	Kevan Pearce	3:06:02:29	
4	AUS 70	Ragamuffin	New South Wales	Farr 50	15.05	Syd Fischer	3:06:11:29	
5	COK1	Nokia	Cook Islands	Farr 79 Ketch Maxi	24.17	David Witt	3:09:19:00	
6	SM1	Fudge	(Victoria (state)) Victoria	Elliott 56	16.96	Peter Hansen	3:11:00:26	
7	6606	Quest	New South Wales	Nelson Marek 46 IMS Racer	14.12	Bob Steel	3:14:41:28	
8	9090	Industrial Quest	Queensland	Nelson Marek 43	13.11	Kevin Miller	3:14:58:46	
9	4826	Aspect Computing	New South Wales	Radford 16.5 Sloop	16.50	David Pescud	3:15:28:24	
10	8338	AFR Midnight Rambler	New South Wales	Hick 35	10.66	Ed Psaltis; Bob Thomas	3:16:04:40	

=== Handicap results (IMS Top 10) ===
Position	Sail Number	Yacht	State/Country	Yacht Type	LOA (Metres)	Skipper	Corrected Time d:hh:mm:ss	Ref
1	8338	AFR Midnight Rambler	New South Wales	Hick 35	10.66	Ed Psaltis; Bob Thomas	2:12:36:23	
2	YC 1000	Ausmaid	South Australia	Farr 47	14.24	Kevan Pearce	2:14:41:54	
3	AUS 70	Ragamuffin	New South Wales	Farr 50	15.05	Syd Fischer	2:16:18:17	
4	9090	Industrial Quest	Queensland	Nelson Marek 43	13.11	Kevin Miller	2:18:31:49	
5	US 17	Sayonara	United States	Farr ILC Maxi	23.80	Larry Ellison	2:19:03:32	
6	IRL8000	Atara	New South Wales	Lyons 43 IMS Racer	13.00	Roger Hickman	2:19:32:48	
7	6606	Quest	New South Wales	Nelson Marek 46 IMS Racer	14.12	Bob Steel	2:20:19:17	
8	2170	Margaret Rintoul II	New South Wales	Sparkman & Stephens S&S 48	14.63	Richard Purcell	2:20:40:54	
9	C1	Brindabella	New South Wales	Jutson 75	22.85	George Snow	2:21:05:36	
10	SM377	Bacardi	(Victoria (state)) Victoria	Peterson 44	13.41	Graeme Ainley; John Williams	2:21:27:38	

== See also ==
- 1979 Fastnet race, another competition where sailors died in severe weather, near Ireland
- Turtling
