= Alone on a Wide Wide Sea =

2006 book by Michael Morpurgo

- Cover art of book
- Author: Michael Morpurgo
- Language: English
- Genre: Children's, historical fiction
- Publisher: HarperCollins
- Publication date: 4 September 2006
- Publication place: United kingdom
- Media type: Print
- ISBN: 978-0-00-723058-7

Alone on a Wide Wide Sea is a children's novel written by Michael Morpurgo, first published in 2006 by HarperCollins. It was partly inspired by the history of English orphans transported to Australia after World War II. The book's title is taken from a line in The Rime of the Ancient Mariner. The novel won the Rotherham Children's Book Award; the Independent Booksellers' Book of the Year for Children; and was short-listed for the Red House Children's Book Award for books for older readers. In 2017, the book was adapted into an audio play by Ian McMillan, which was broadcast on BBC Radio 2 in four half-hour parts.

== Plot ==
=== Part One (The Story of Arthur Hobhouse) ===
Arthur Hobhouse tells the story of his life. His latest memory was that he was an orphan from Liverpool, England, and that, at the age of six, around 1946, he was transported to Australia to find a new home. He is parted from his sister, Kitty upon being there. He later gets separated from his sister. He distinctly remembers the time of their parting, which was at their orphanage, when she gave him a key to hold onto and told him to never lose it. He treasures the key from then on, despite not knowing what it is for. He boards the ship and leaves with other orphans for Australia.

During the trip Arthur is bullied by the other boys in his bunk for his age, his accent, his habit of humming London Bridge is Falling Down to get himself to sleep, and for his sea sickness. While sick over the ship's railing he meets and befriends fellow London orphan Marty, who stands up to the boys bullying Arthur by punching their leader, Wes Snarkey.

Upon arrival in Sydney, an officer tries to separate Arthur and Marty, but Marty is persistent that they stay together, and the two, along with the remaining boys, are taken on a bus ride through the outback. Arthur notices that only one of the boys from his cabin is on the bus, Wes. Marty talks about how brilliant their new life will be, while Arthur reckons his lucky key is being lucky for him.

The bus draws to a halt at a farm called Cooper's Station. A gramophone is playing What a Friend We Have in Jesus. The farm is run by Mr. Bacon (known to the boys as Piggy Bacon), and his wife, Mrs. Ida Bacon (known as Mrs. Piggy). The couple are very unalike. Piggy Bacon is cruel, loud, and claims to be a devout Christian but is not; Mrs. Piggy is kind, caring, quiet, a good Christian, and completely under her husband's power.

Soon, Mrs. Piggy's kindness is revealed, and the boys start calling her by her name, Ida. Ida attempts to burn the farmhouse down to free the children from the working camp, but fails. Wes, now the boys' heroes because of his blatant defiance, attempts to escape on a horse called Black Jack, but is brought back dead by the bushmen. Arthur and Marty later escape on Black Jack into the bush, where the bushmen look after them. One day the bushmen leave them for no apparent reason. It turned out that the bushmen had left them on the doorstep of Aunty Megs, a woman who looks after the orphaned animals of the bush, taking them in like they were her own children.

One day, she is badly injured after falling off her horse whilst riding in the outback. Soon after nursing her back to health, Arthur and Marty are sent as apprentices to a boat building firm in Sydney by Aunty Megs. Everything is well for a few years, until the boat yard's owner, heavily in debt, burns his business down to collect insurance, and is sent to prison. Unemployed and broke, Marty resorts to drinking. Eventually, Marty drowned after falling in the harbour after a night out.

Arthur returns to Aunty Megs for a few years, until her death. Her estranged son sells her house, so Arthur moves out and finds a job as a fisherman. He stays for a couple of years until one night while in a fishing boat he gets thoughts of a fish suffering. He then quits fishing and joins the Navy to earn money, be at sea, and not fish anymore. Being deeply scarred by the war, Arthur then joins a trawling company. He falls into a stupor for fifteen years of losing job after job, gambling away whatever he earned, and drinking. One day, he wakes up in a hospital in Tasmania, having accidentally taking a lot of pills with whiskey. He falls in love with his nurse, Zita, and when he recovers, her father, the Cretan owner of Stavros Boats, gives him permission to marry her. They have a daughter called Alexis, nicknamed Allie by Arthur.

When Allie is ten years old, she makes Arthur promise that they'll sail to England to find Kitty. Zita agrees, but only when Allie turns eighteen. This inspires Arthur to make a bath toy boat for Allie, called the Kitty. The idea evolves through three more stages; the Kitty II, a pond boat; the Kitty III, a bigger boat for Allie to sail in river races; and finally, when Allie turns eighteen, the Kitty IV, in which they planned to sail to England in. Unfortunately, after the boat's launch, Arthur collapses, and is diagnosed with a terminal brain tumor. He finishes telling his story to Allie, who types it up, and the first part of the book ends days before his death.

=== Part Two (The Journey of the Kitty Four) ===
After her father's death, Allie sails alone from Australia to England.

En route to New Zealand, the Kitty IV is joined by an albatross. Allie becomes convinced that the spirit of her father lives on in the albatross, and the bird becomes an important source of motivation. Sadly, after rounding Cape Horn, she accidentally kills the albatross, as it gets fouled in a fishing line that she is trailing behind the boat. This loss triggers her to fall into a depressive mood, which eventually is lifted when she encounters a loggerhead turtle.

She attracts the attention of Marc Topolski, an American astronaut on board the International Space Station (ISS). They strike up a friendship via phone and email, as the ISS frequently passes overhead Kitty IV. Then with the help of her mother, grandfather and the astronaut she finds Kitty. When Allie meets Kitty, Kitty tells her how she was adopted by a Canadian family and grew up with them in Canada. Kitty then produces a box and Allie, who still has her father's lucky key, gives Kitty the key who inserts it into the box. The box is a musical box. It plays London Bridge is Falling Down, Allie's father's favourite song. Allie then proceeds to read Kitty her father's story.

== Background ==
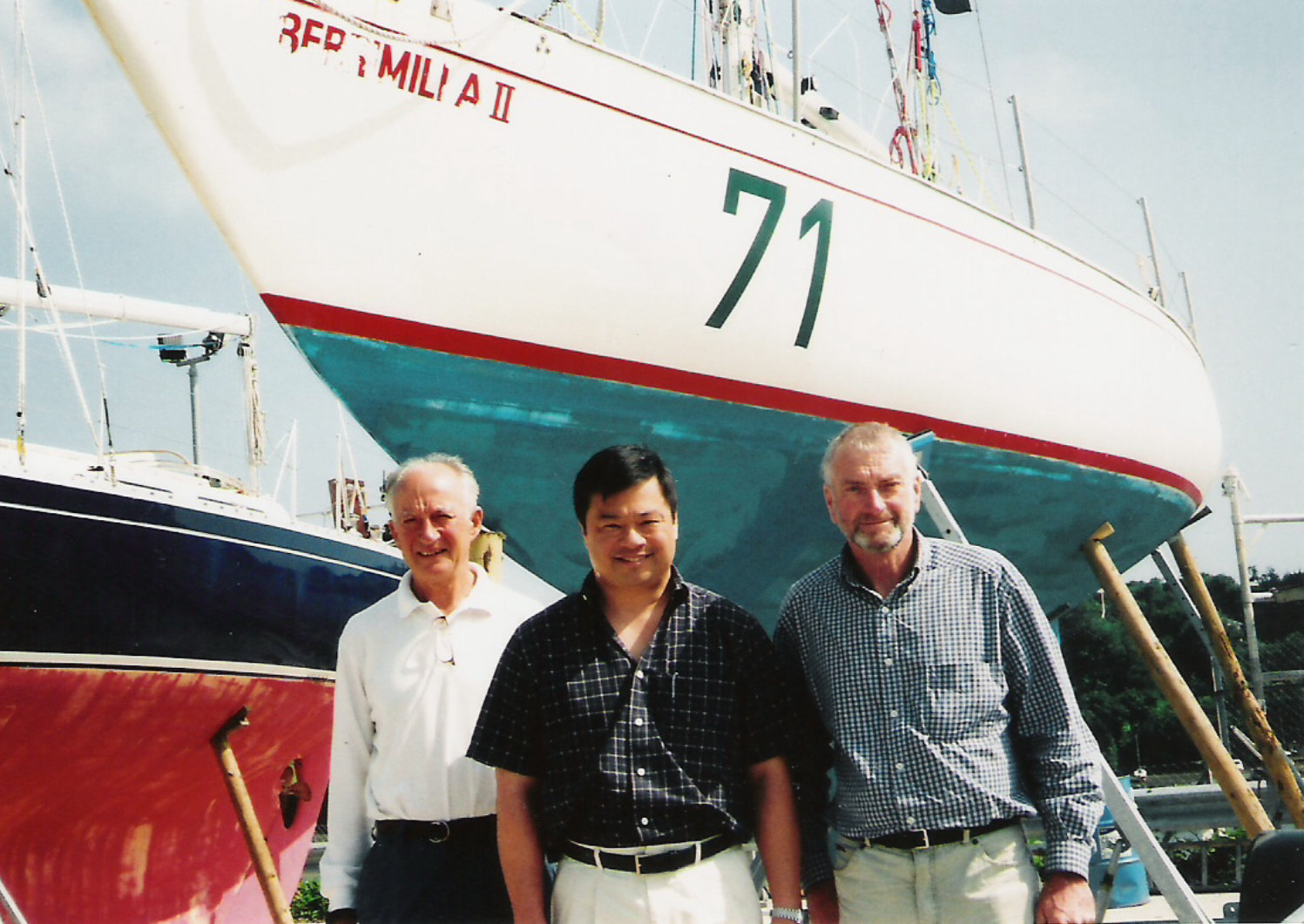
Leroy Chiao (center) visits Whitworth, Crozier and Berrimilla in Falmouth.

Morpurgo said he wrote the novel in approximately two and a half to three months. The inspiration for the story was two-fold; the major motivation was Morpurgo being touched after hearing stories of "broken lives of young children shipped out from the United Kingdom to the colonies after World War II". Secondly, Morpurgo tells the story of when his Australian friend Alex Whitworth and his mate Peter Crozier, sailed around the world in their first circumnavigation. According to Morpurgo, they saw a strange light in the sky one night in March 2005, and started emailing their friends in Sydney about it. After discovering it was in fact the International Space Station, their friends in Sydney emailed NASA who put them in touch with the Space Station. Morpurgo says the "extraordinary communication" that took place between astronaut Leroy Chiao, the commander of Expedition 10, and Whitworth and Crozier, "fired up his imagination". Morpurgo gives thanks to Whitworth and Crozier in the title page of the book for "informing and inspiring this story".

== Reception ==
The novel won the Rotherham Children's Book Award; the Independent Booksellers' Book of the Year for Children; and was short-listed for the Red House Children's Book Award for books for older readers.

Clare Kennedy from Reading Time wrote that it is a "emotionally charged novel, and the two parts of the novel are really about the lives of two or maybe three generations of one family, with their roots in England, Australia and Greece". Jennifer Taylor of The Bookseller noted that "as so often with Morpurgo, the perspective added by the framing of the narrative adds great poignancy".

In her review for The Observer, Kate Kellaway said it was his "best book in years", and she also remarked that she "read the yarn aloud to my children, unsure whether it might prove too sophisticated, but they were completely hooked, as was I, for the length of the voyage". British writer Julia Eccleshare opined that the "two overlapping stories shot through with sea themes capture the heartbreak and happiness of childhood". The audiobook was narrated by Emilia Fox and Tim Pigott-Smith. In her review of the audiobook, Rachel Redford of The Observer noted that the audiobook is "brilliant for grown-ups too".

== Radio adaptation ==
In 2017, the book was adapted into an audio play by Ian McMillan, which was broadcast on BBC Radio 2 in four half-hour parts. The play featured Morpurgo; Jason Donovan as Arthur Hobhouse, and Toby Jones as Piggy Bacon. It also featured original music from British folk singers, including; Julie Matthews and Chris While, Boo Hewerdine and Jez Lowe. Charlotte Runcie of The Daily Telegraph wrote "this is a moving and evocative first-time dramatisation, and like many other Morpurgo adaptations, also includes traditional music to great effect". Kate Chisholm from The Spectator said that Morpurgo is "such a natural storyteller and can draw you in straightaway, with his voice, so warm and natural, his ease of manner, his sense of phrasing and his words, simple but direct, as if he were talking to you, and you alone".
