= Swan 46 Mk III =

Sailboat class

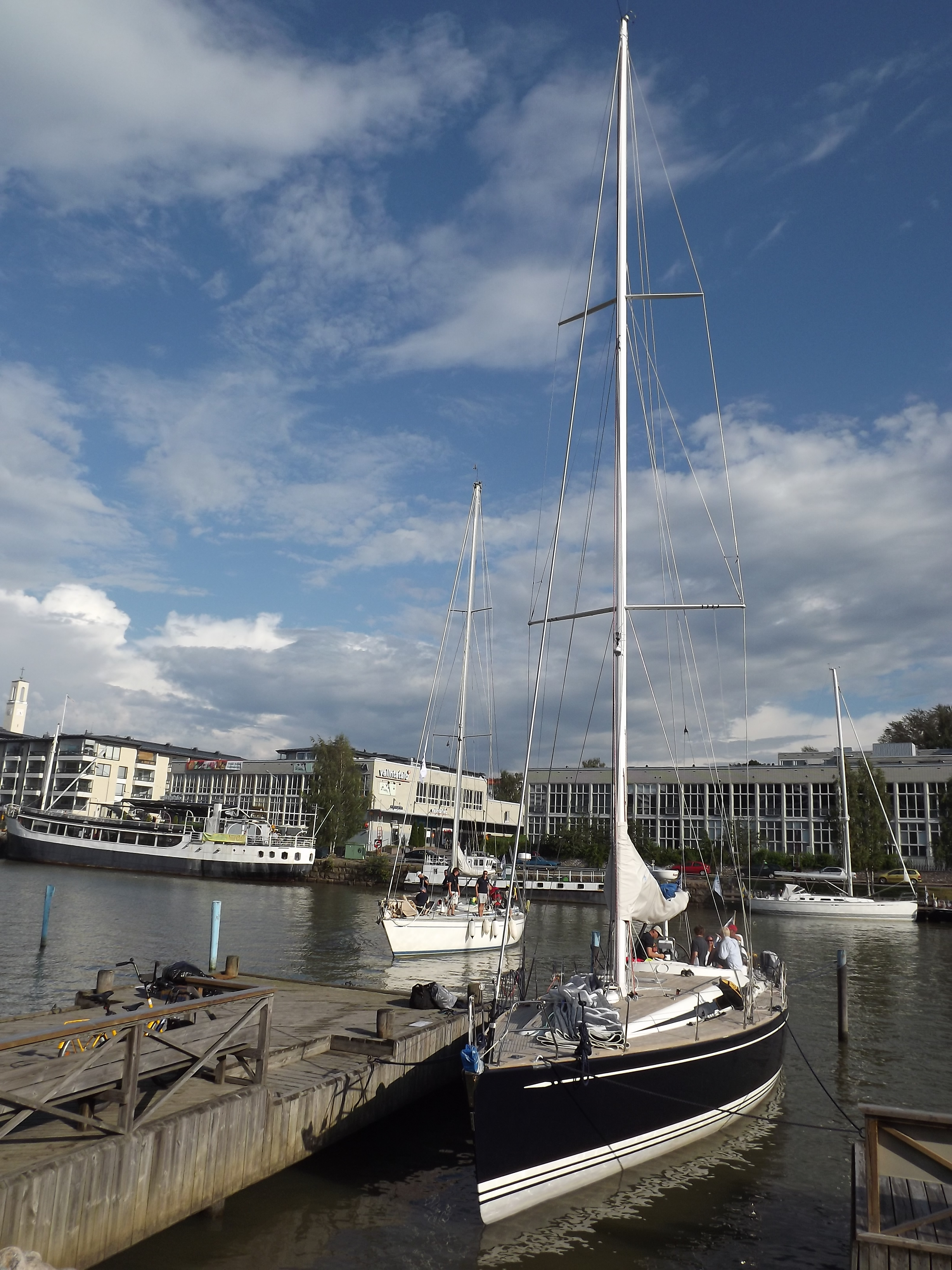

Development
- Designer: Germán Frers
- Location: Finland
- Year: 2004
- No. built: 25
- Builder: Oy Nautor AB
- Role: Cruiser
- Name: Swan 46 Mk III

Boat
- Displacement: 32,408 lb (14,700 kg)
- Draft: 7.22 ft (2.20 m)

Hull
- Type: monohull
- Construction: glassfibre
- LOA: 46.00 ft (14.02 m)
- LWL: 39.57 ft (12.06 m)
- Beam: 13.98 ft (4.26 m)
- Engine: Volvo Penta 72 hp (54 kW) diesel engine

Hull appendages
- Keel: Fin keel
- Ballast: 12,125 lb (5,500 kg)
- Rudder: Spade-type rudder

Rig
- Rig type: Bermuda rig
- I foretriangle height: 61.02 ft (18.60 m)
- J foretriangle base: 17.39 ft (5.30 m)
- P mainsail luff: 55.45 ft (16.90 m)
- E mainsail foot: 19.69 ft (6.00 m)

Sails
- Sailplan: Masthead sloop
- Mainsail area: 617 sq ft (57.3 m^{2})
- Jib/genoa area: 562 sq ft (52.2 m^{2})
- Spinnaker area: 1,959 sq ft (182.0 m^{2})
- Upwind sail area: 1,179 sq ft (109.5 m^{2})
- Downwind sail area: 2,576 sq ft (239.3 m^{2})

Racing
- PHRF: 54

The Swan 46 Mk III, also called the Swan 461 and the Swan 46-3, is a Finnish sailboat that was designed by Germán Frers as a cruiser and first built in 2004.

The design was originally marketed by the manufacturer as the Swan 46, but is now usually referred to as the Swan 46 Mark III to differentiate it from the unrelated Swan 46 Mk I and Swan 46 Mk II designs.

== Production ==
The design was built by Oy Nautor AB in Finland, from 2004 to 2007 with 25 boats completed, but it is now out of production.

== Design ==
The Swan 46 Mk III is a recreational keelboat, built predominantly of glassfibre, with wood trim. It has a masthead sloop rig, two sets of swept spreaders and aluminium spars, with carbon fibre spars optional. The hull has a slightly raked stem, a reverse transom, an internally mounted spade-type rudder controlled by dual wheels and a fixed fin keel with a weighted bulb or optional glassfibre, hydraulic daggerboard keel and twin rudders. It displaces 32,408 lb (14,700 kg) empty and carries 12,125 lb (5,500 kg) of ballast.

The keel-equipped version of the boat has a draft of 7.22 ft (2.20 m), while the daggerboard-equipped version has a draft of 10.83 ft (3.30 m) with the daggerboard extended and 3.97 ft (1.21 m) with it retracted, allowing operation in shallow water.

The boat is fitted with a Swedish Volvo Penta diesel engine of 53 or 72 hp (40 or 54 kW) for docking and manoeuvring. The fuel tank holds 92 U.S. gallons (350 L; 77 imp gal) and the fresh water tank has a capacity of 119 U.S. gallons (450 L; 99 imp gal).

The design has sleeping accommodation for six people, with an angled double berth in the bow cabin, an L-shaped settee and a straight settee in the main cabin and two aft cabins, each with a double berth. The galley is located on the starboard side just forward of the companionway ladder. The galley is L-shaped and is equipped with a three-burner stove, an ice box and a double sink. There are two heads, one just forward of the bow cabin in the forepeak and one on the port side, aft.

For sailing downwind the design may be equipped with a symmetrical spinnaker of 1,959 sq ft (182.0 m^{2}).

The design has a hull speed of 8.43 kn (15.61 km/h) and a PHRF handicap of 54 with the daggerboard..

== Operational history ==
A 2003 boats.com preview of the design noted, "the Swan 461 represents a key milestone for Nautor, taking the entry-level position in the new and improved 'cruising line'. Historically, models of this size have formed the biggest part of Nautor's core business, with success stories such as the Swan 40 and Swan 44 characterising the beautiful lines that have become synonymous with all Swans on the water today."

In a 2006 review for Sailing World, Tom Bessinger wrote, "it's obvious this latest Swan isn't a flat-out racer, in fact, it's downright luxurious. But for those who walk both sides of the cruiser/racer divide, it's a boat that will satisfy both needs with aplomb. Whether it be a doublehanded race to Bermuda, or simply a friendly race to the best mooring after a day of cruising, the Swan 46 will get you there with style and speed."

In a 2006 review, Bluewater Sailing concluded, "in a time when many boats try to be everything to everyone, Swan must be commended for not conceding to compromise. The Swan 46 is a high performance cruiser that will be easily managed by a couple offshore and is simple enough for impromptu afternoon sails. It is the perfect boat for a couple looking to trade in their racing campaigns for a cruiser that is going to give them just as much of a thrill when the wind kicks up."

In a 2007 review, Barry Pickthall wrote in Yachting, "we had the opportunity to sail the Swan 46 in a spanking 25-knot breeze. She was responsive and fast on a broad reach, topping 11 knots at times. Going upwind, we took in a reef using Nautor's single-reef line system and took in a few rolls on the genoa using the push-button winch controls. She remained remarkably light on the helm. She was also stable without any slamming; best of all, we didn't get a speck of spray in the cockpit despite the short sharp chop."

== See also ==
- List of sailing boat types
