= Swan 48-3 Frers =

Sailboat class

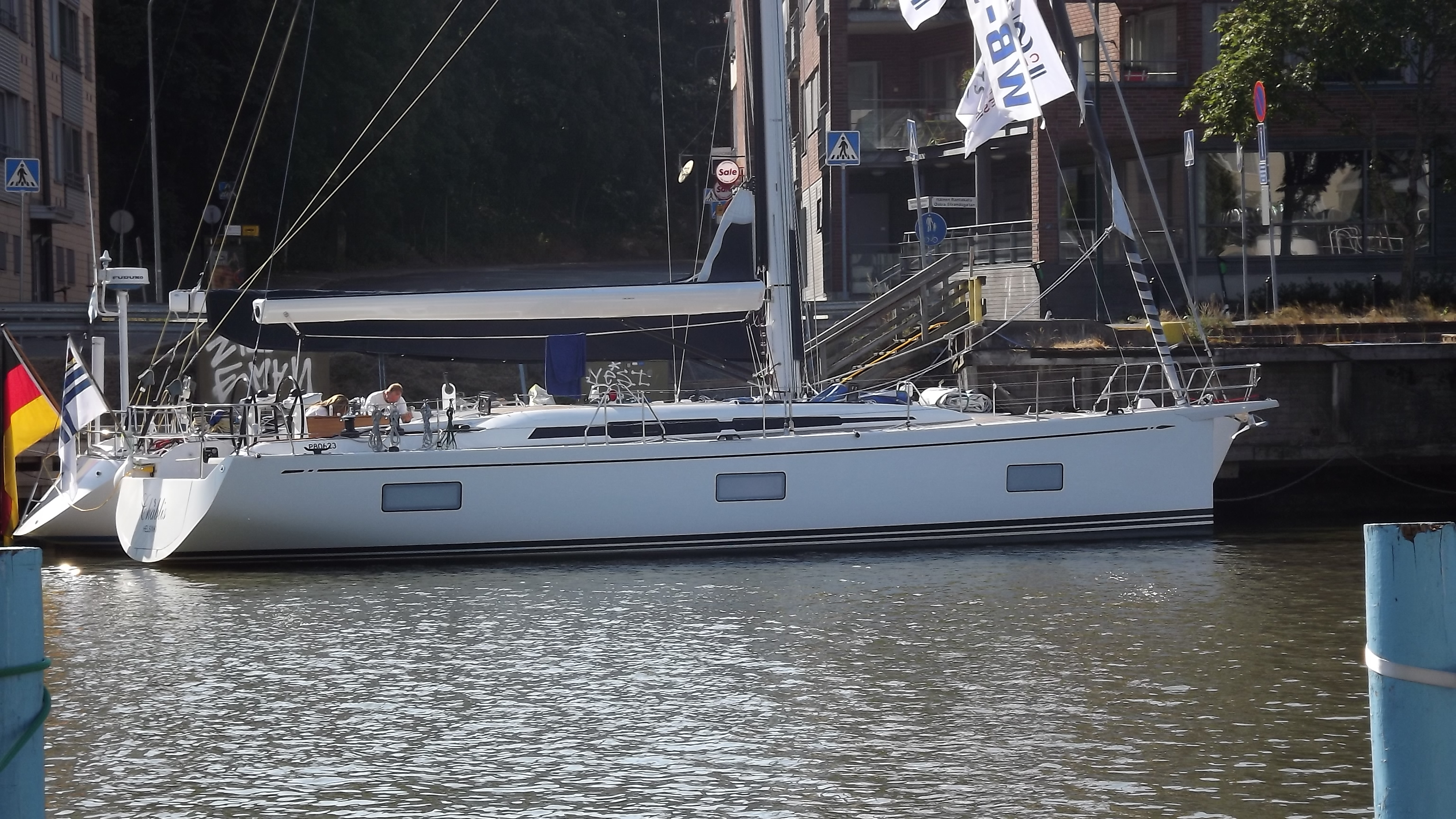

Development
- Designer: Germán Frers; Misa Poggi
- Location: Finland
- Year: 2019
- Builder: Oy Nautor AB
- Role: Cruiser
- Name: Swan 48-3 Frers

Boat
- Displacement: 33,069 lb (15,000 kg)
- Draft: 7.87 ft (2.40 m)

Hull
- Type: monohull
- Construction: glassfibre
- LOA: 51.06 ft (15.56 m)
- LWL: 45.54 ft (13.88 m)
- Beam: 15.06 ft (4.59 m)
- Engine: Volvo D2-75 75 hp (56 kW) diesel engine, with saildrive

Hull appendages
- Keel: Fin keel, with weighted bulb
- Ballast: 11,464 lb (5,200 kg)
- Rudder: Spade-type rudder

Rig
- Rig type: Bermuda rig
- I foretriangle height: 68.24 ft (20.80 m)
- J foretriangle base: 18.57 ft (5.66 m)
- P mainsail luff: 65.29 ft (19.90 m)
- E mainsail foot: 21.65 ft (6.60 m)

Sails
- Sailplan: Fractional rigged sloop
- Mainsail area: 830 sq ft (77 m^{2})
- Jib/genoa area: 673 sq ft (62.5 m^{2})
- Gennaker area: 2,333 sq ft (216.7 m^{2})
- Total sail area: 1,340.37 sq ft (124.524 m^{2})

The Swan 48-3 Frers is a Finnish sailboat that was designed by Germán Frers, as a blue water cruiser and first built in 2019. The interior design is by Misa Poggi.

The design is marketed by the manufacturer as the Swan 48 MkII, but is usually referred to as the Swan 48-3 Frers, to avoid confusion with two previous models, the Swan 48 and Swan 48 Frers. In 2023 the model was updated and re-launched under the same name of Swan 48 MkII.

== Production ==
The design has been built by Oy Nautor AB in Finland, since 2019 and remained in production in 2023.

== Design ==
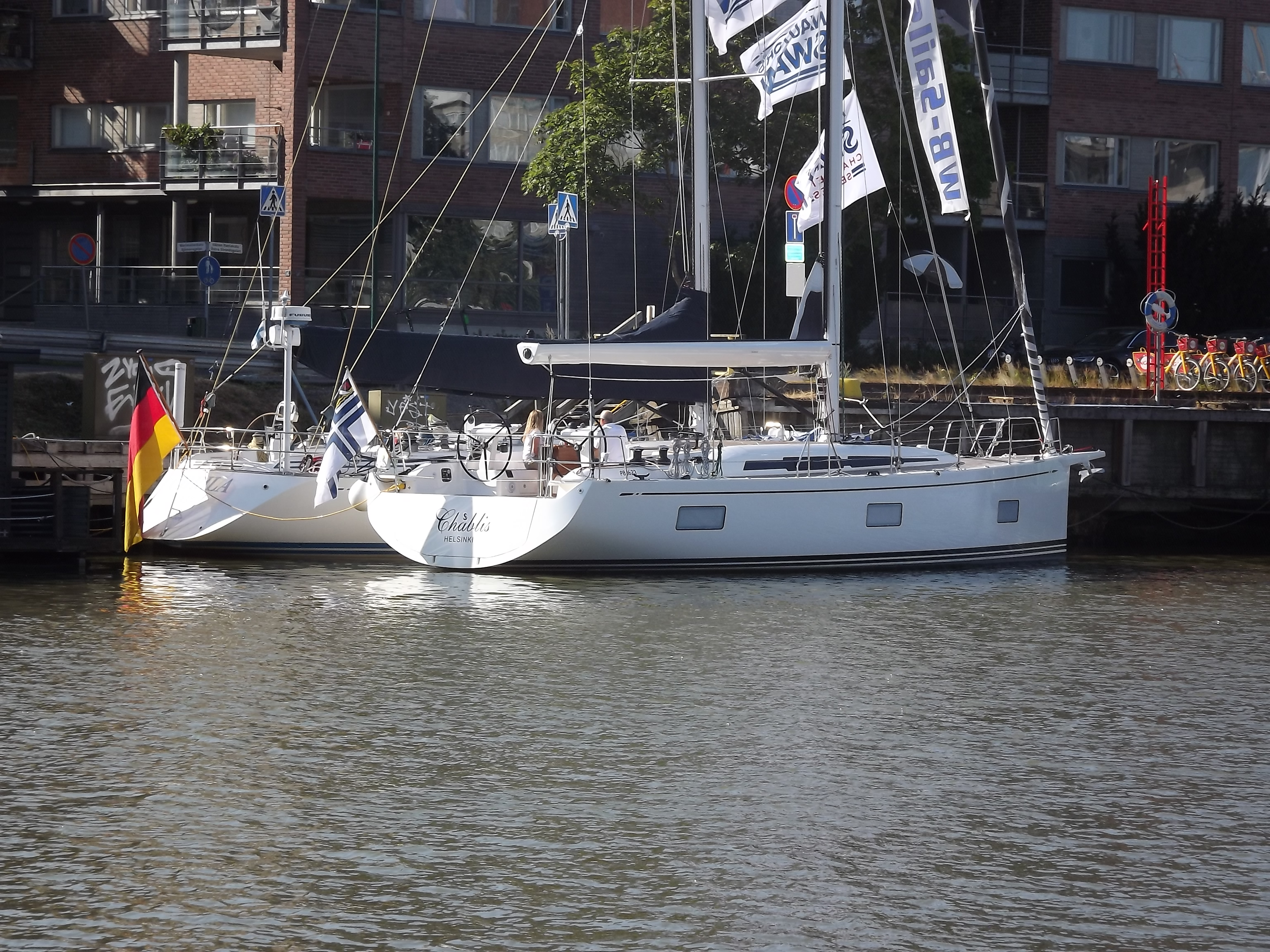
Swan 48-3 Frers showing the transom

The Swan 48-3 Frers is a recreational keelboat, built predominantly of glassfibre, with wood trim. It has a fractional sloop rig, with a bowsprit, a plumb stem, a reverse transom with a drop-down tailgate swimming platform, an internally mounted spade-type rudder controlled by dual wheels and a fixed fin keel with a weighted bulb, deep draft racing keel or optional shoal-draft keel. The fin keel model displaces 33,069 lb (15,000 kg) and carries 11,464 lb (5,200 kg) of ballast. There is a dinghy garage aft.

The boat has a draft of 7.87 ft (2.40 m) with the standard keel and 6.56 ft (2.00 m) with the optional shoal draft keel.

The boat is fitted with a Swedish Volvo D2-75 diesel engine of 75 hp (56 kW), with a saildrive for docking and manoeuvring. The fuel tank holds 95 U.S. gallons (360 L; 79 imp gal) and the fresh water tank has a capacity of 132 U.S. gallons (500 L; 110 imp gal).

The design's standard interior has sleeping accommodation for six people, with a double island berth in the bow cabin, a U-shaped settee and two seats in the main cabin and an aft cabin with four berths. The galley is located on the port side just forward of the companionway ladder. The galley is L-shaped and is equipped with a three-burner stove, an ice box and a double sink. There are two heads with showers, one in the bow cabin on the port side and one on the starboard side, aft.

For reaching and sailing downwind the design may be equipped with a gennaker of 2,333 sq ft (216.7 m^{2}) flown from the bowsprit.

The design has a hull speed of 9.04 kn (16.74 km/h).

An update of the boat in 2023 introduced a new bowsprit design, new chainplate positions, a new cabin window shape, plus an improved hydraulic system for the transom tailgate.

== Operational history ==
In a 2019 review for Yachting News, Diego Ruggiano wrote, "More than 40 years after the launch of the first iconic Swan 48 that, designed by Sparkman & Stephens, literally made the history of sailing, Nautor's Swan introduces the new Swan 48: a blue water cruiser for fast cruising.

A 2019 Yachts Croatia review noted, the "latest Frers bluewater cruiser/racer hull generation is inspired by modern Ocean racers and it is more powerful, balanced, stable and safe. The new Swan 48 has been designed with heart and passion and is the result of a rational brief based on market analysis and the experience of the builder, agents and designers, coordinated by Nautor Product Line Leader."

In a 2019 review, Chloé Torterat wrote in Sailboats News, "the lines are very classic in the continuity of the Swan philosophy. The Swan 48 is sober and elegant, yet sporty. The architectural trend is to obtain stable and powerful boats at the usual angles of heel, and to do this, the architects have widened the hull and optimized the keel."

== See also ==
- List of sailing boat types
