= 1996 Sydney to Hobart Yacht Race =

1996 annual yacht race in Australia

52nd Sydney to Hobart Yacht Race
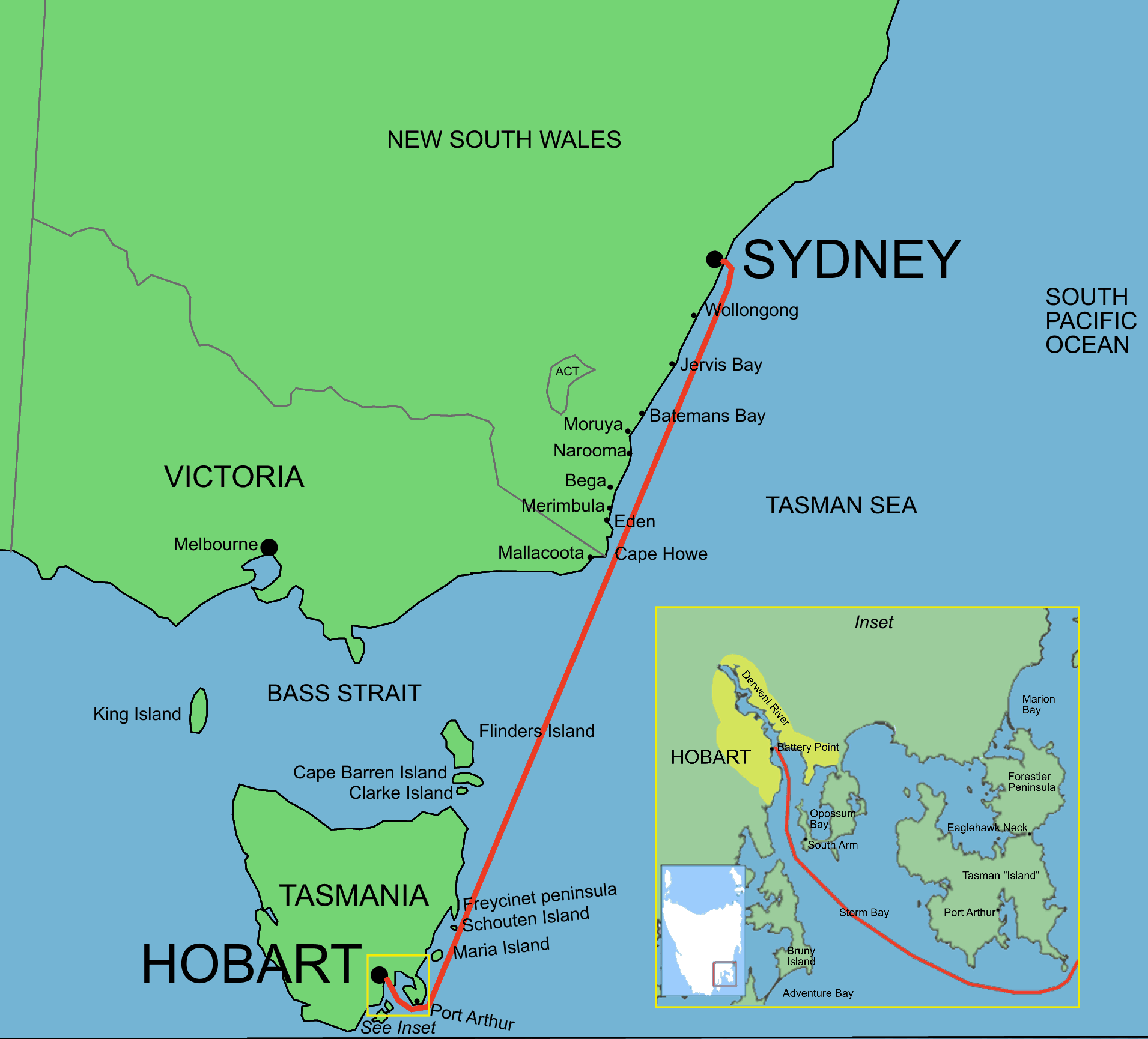

Event information
- Type: Yacht
- Dates: 26 December 1996 - 3 January 1997
- Sponsor: Telstra
- Host city: Sydney, Hobart
- Boats: 95
- Distance: 628 nautical miles (1,163 km)
- Website: Rolex Sydney Hobart

Results
- Winner (1996): Morning Glory (Hasso Plattner)

Succession
- Previous: Sayonara (Larry Ellison) in 1995
- Next: Brindabella (George Snow) (George Snow) in 1997

The 1996 Sydney to Hobart Yacht Race, sponsored by Telstra, was the 52nd annual running of the "blue water classic" Sydney to Hobart Yacht Race. As in past editions of the race, it was hosted by the Cruising Yacht Club of Australia based in Sydney, New South Wales. As with previous Sydney to Hobart Yacht Races, the 1996 edition began on Sydney Harbour, at noon on Boxing Day (26 December 1996), before heading south for 630 nautical miles (1,170 km) through the Tasman Sea, past Bass Strait, into Storm Bay and up the River Derwent, to cross the finish line in Hobart, Tasmania.

The 1996 fleet comprised 95 starters of which 78 completed the race and 17 yachts retired.

== Results ==
=== Line Honours results (Top 10) ===
Position	Sail number	Yacht	State/Country	Yacht type	LOA (Metres)	Skipper	Elapsed time d:hh:mm:ss	Ref
1	GER 4540	Morning Glory	Germany	Reichel Pugh 80 Maxi	24.05	Hasso Plattner	2:14:07:10	
2	HKG 88	Exile	Hong Kong	Reichel Pugh Pocket Maxi	20.00	Warwick Millar	2:16:53:15	
3	8888	Foxtel Amazon	New South Wales	Steinman Pocket Maxi	20.75	Peter Walker	2:21:31:53	
4	6070	Sydney	New South Wales	Murray Sydney 60	18.18	Charles Curran	2:22:56:35	
5	KB 80	Condor of Currabubula	New South Wales	Holland Maxi	24.30	Tony Paola	3:01:10:29	
6	AUS 545	BZW Challenge	New South Wales	Farr Corel 45	13.80	Ray Roberts	3:01:25:25	
7	SM100	Ausmaid	(Victoria (state)) Victoria	Farr 47	14.24	Giorgio Gjergja	3:02:31:45	
8	IR 8000	Atara	New South Wales	Lyons 43	12.99	Roger Hickman	3:05:08:47	
9	YC214	Prime Example	South Australia	Davidson-Murray Cruiser Racer	15.90	Graham Williams	3:05:18:40	
10	5612	Abracadabra	New South Wales	Tripp 47	14.25	James Mark Anthony	3:07:13:32	

=== Handicap results (Top 10) ===
Position	Sail number	Yacht	State/Country	Yacht type	LOA (Metres)	Skipper	Corrected time d:hh:mm:ss	Ref
1	SM100	Ausmaid	(Victoria (state)) Victoria	Farr 47	14.24	Giorgio Gjergja	2:12:35:59	
2	HKG 88	Exile	Hong Kong	Reichel Pugh Pocket Maxi	20.00	Warwick Millar	2:12:46:25	
3	IR 8000	Atara	New South Wales	Lyons 43	12.99	Roger Hickman	2:12:47:57	
4	AUS 545	BZW Challenge	New South Wales	Farr Corel 45	13.80	Ray Roberts	2:12:49:00	
5	MK69	Bit O Fluff	Queensland	Murray ILC 40	12.40	Warren Brooks	2:13:47:41	
6	GER 4540	Morning Glory	Germany	Reichel Pugh 80 Maxi	24.05	Hasso Plattner	2:14:07:10	
7	5612	Abracadabra	New South Wales	Tripp 47	14.25	James Mark Anthony	2:15:38:59	
8	6070	Sydney	New South Wales	Murray Sydney 60	18.18	Charles Curran	2:15:49:13	
9	1996	No Fearr	Queensland	Farr IMS 40	12.00	Carey Ramm	2:16:10:44	
10	YC214	Prime Example	South Australia	Davidson-Murray Cruiser Racer	15.90	Graham Williams	2:17:12:43	
