= Stanley Marathon =

Marathon in the Falkland Islands

- Date: March
- Location: Stanley, Falkland Islands
- Event type: Road
- Distance: Marathon
- Primary sponsor: Standard Chartered
- Established: 2005
- Website: Stanley Marathon

The Stanley Marathon is a marathon race in Stanley, Falkland Islands. It is the southernmost AIMS-certified marathon in the world. Run annually since 2005, and internationally accredited since 2006, it is considered difficult due to variable weather and strong prevailing winds.

== History ==
The Stanley Marathon was first held in 2005 and became internationally accredited in 2006. Local runner Hugh Marsden won the first three editions of the race. Around 50 international and local runners complete the race every year.

For the ninth edition held in 2013, a group of British veterans from the Falklands War to raise money for the Royal Marines Charitable Trust Fund and the Royal British Legion. Multiple editions of the race have raised money for Seeing Is Believing. The race is sponsored by Standard Chartered.

Australian sailor Alex Whitworth participated in the first edition of the race during his first circumnavigation. Teslyn Barkman, a Falkland Island politician, was the women's winner of the 2010 and 2014 editions. In 2011, Manuel Méndez became the first man from Argentina to win the race. Argentina's Pedro Luis Gómez set the course record of 2:31:46 in 2017. The women's course record of 3:12:13 was set by Claudia Camargo in 2012.

== Course ==
The Stanley Marathon course is the southernmost AIMS-certified marathon in the world. It is considered a difficult course, partially due to the weather conditions, with cold temperatures and strong winds. The course is also known for steep hills and the prevalence of wildlife. The course takes runners around the capital city of Stanley, including the Port Stanley Airport. The race includes a four-person relay option.

== Past winners ==
Key: Course record

Winners of the Stanley Marathon
Edition	Year	Men's Winner	Time (h:m:s)	Women's Winner	Time (h:m:s)
1st	2005	Hugh Marsden (FLK)	3:07:30	Kelly Angus (GBR)	3:34:29
2nd	2006	Hugh Marsden (FLK)	3:04:16	Katherine Badham (GBR)	3:28:32
3rd	2007	Hugh Marsden (FLK)	3:05:22	Lisa Turner (GBR)	3:50:25
4th	2008	Simon Almond (GBR)	2:55:46	Amy Cruickshank (GBR)	3:44:48
5th	2009	Lee Pattison (GBR)	2:55:51	Andrea Mastrovincenzo (ARG)	3:12:29
6th	2010	Steven Frear (GBR)	2:43:05	Teslyn Barkman (FLK)	4:08:33
7th	2011	Manuel Méndez (ARG)	3:03:13	Kate Burston (GBR)	4:09:59
8th	2012	Robert Harden (GBR)	2:52:39	Claudia Camargo (ARG)	3:12:13
9th	2013	Andrew Van Kints (GBR)	2:51:43	Dawn Teed (GBR)	3:50:24
10th	2014	Timothy Drew (GBR)	2:54:39	Teslyn Barkman (FLK)	3:34:40
11th	2015	Timothy Drew (GBR)	2:35:39	Carrie-Ann Ward (GBR)	3:39:54
12th	2016	Eduardo Lencina (ARG)	2:35:34	Penny Grayson (GBR)	3:47:22
13th	2017	Pedro Luis Gómez (ARG)	2:31:46	Valerie Spickerman (ARG)	3:33:50
14th	2018	Facundo Reales (ARG)	2:42:57	Natalie Bown (GBR)	3:33:47
15th	2019	Iain Bailey (GBR)	2:42:35	Georgia Ball (GBR)	n/a
16th	2022	Lee Athersmith (GBR)	n/a	Elizabeth Driscoll (GBR)	4:01:00
17th	2023	Brendon Lee (RSA)	3:09:16	Sharon Turner (GBR)	4:00:22
18th	2024	Jack Hindle (GBR)	2:43:15	Rosalind Cheek (FLK)	4:17:09
19th	2025	Stephen Winstanley (GBR)	3:12:57	Victoria Dutton (GBR)	3:59:02
20th	2026	Michael Banham (GBR)	3:08:00	Candela Cerrone (ARG)	3:15:28
