= 1999 Sydney to Hobart Yacht Race =

1999 annual yacht race in Australia

55th Sydney to Hobart Yacht Race
Event information
- Type: Yacht
- Dates: 26 December 1999 - 4 January 2000
- Sponsor: Telstra
- Host city: Sydney, Hobart
- Boats: 79
- Distance: 628 nautical miles (1,163 km)
- Website: Rolex Sydney Hobart

Results
- Winner (1999): Nokia (Stefan Myralf & Michael Spies)

Succession
- Previous: Sayonara (Larry Ellison) in 1998
- Next: Nicorette II (Ludde Ingvall) in 2000

The 1999 Sydney to Hobart Yacht Race, sponsored by Telstra, was the 55th annual running of the "blue water classic" Sydney to Hobart Yacht Race. As in past editions of the race, it was hosted by the Cruising Yacht Club of Australia based in Sydney, New South Wales. As with previous Sydney to Hobart Yacht Races, the 1999 edition began on Sydney Harbour, at noon on Boxing Day (26 December 1999), before heading south for 630 nautical miles (1,170 km) through the Tasman Sea, past Bass Strait, into Storm Bay and up the River Derwent, to cross the finish line in Hobart, Tasmania.

The 1999 fleet comprised 79 starters of which 49 completed the race and 30 yachts retired.

== Results ==
=== Line Honours results (Top 10) ===
Position	Sail number	Yacht	State/Country	Yacht type	LOA (Metres)	Skipper	Elapsed time d:hh:mm:ss	Ref
1	DEN2001	Nokia	Denmark	Farr Volvo Ocean 60	19.44	Stefan Myralf; Michael Spies	1:19:48:02	
2	C1	Brindabella	New South Wales	Jutson 75	22.85	George Snow	1:20:46:33	
3	M10	Wild Thing	(Victoria (state)) Victoria	Murray Burns Dovell ILC 70	21.30	Grant Wharington	1:21:13:37	
4	881	Magna Data	New South Wales	Dovell Open 60	18.18	Sean Langman	2:01:37:21	
5	9431	Marchioness	New South Wales	Lavranos Maxi Sloop	22.80	Michael Cranitch	2:02:48:43	
6	7441	Bumblebee V	New South Wales	Murray Burns Dovell MBD 62	19.00	John Kahlbetzer	2:02:58:05	
7	1836	Yendys	New South Wales	Farr 49	15.07	Geoff Ross	2:05:57:30	
8	6070	Sydney	New South Wales	Murray Sydney 60	18.18	Charles Curran	2:06:40:23	
9	AUS 70	Ragamuffin	New South Wales	Farr 50	15.15	Syd Fischer	2:07:01:08	
10	YC1000	Ausmaid	South Australia	Farr 47	14.47	Kevan Pearce	2:07:29:10	

=== Handicap results (Top 10) ===
Position	Sail number	Yacht	State/Country	Yacht type	LOA (Metres)	Skipper	Corrected time d:hh:mm:ss	Ref
1	1836	Yendys	New South Wales	Farr 49	15.07	Geoff Ross	1:20:32:53	
2	C1	Brindabella	New South Wales	Jutson 75	22.85	George Snow	1:20:39:50	
3	YC1000	Ausmaid	South Australia	Farr 47	14.47	Kevan Pearce	1:20:54:18	
4	AUS 70	Ragamuffin	New South Wales	Farr 50	15.15	Syd Fischer	1:21:34:59	
5	IRL8000	Atara	New South Wales	Lyons 43	13.00	Roger Hickman	1:22:11:28	
6	7441	Bumblebee V	New South Wales	Murray Burns Dovell MBD 62	19.00	John Kahlbetzer	1:22:14:55	
7	2006	Sword of Orion	New South Wales	Murray Burns Dovell Sydney AC40	12.47	Rob Kothe	1:22:23:02	
8	SM401	Young Australia	(Victoria (state)) Victoria	Farr 40	12.41	Laurie Shannon	1:23:46:45	
9	SM409	Terranova	(Victoria (state)) Victoria	Farr 40	12.41	Shane Tyrrell; Dean Wilson	1:23:52:26	
10	HY1220	Red Jacket	Western Australia	Radford 40	12.00	Ron Lally	2:02:53:55	
