= Swan 48 Frers =

Sailboat class

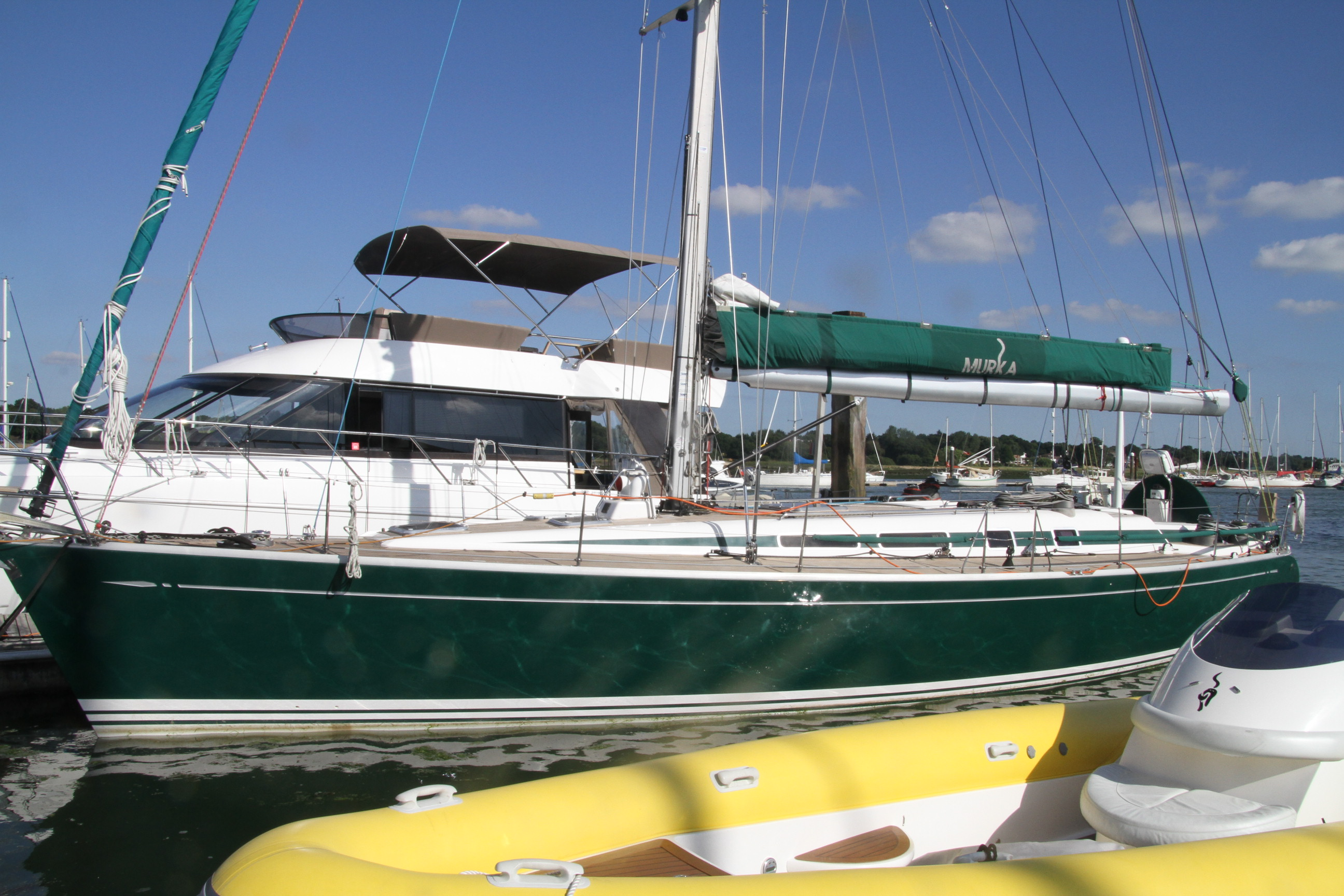

Development
- Designer: Germán Frers
- Location: Finland
- Year: 1995
- No. built: 57
- Builder: Oy Nautor AB
- Role: Cruiser-Racer
- Name: Swan 48 Frers

Boat
- Displacement: 31,500 lb (14,288 kg)
- Draft: 7.81 ft (2.38 m)

Hull
- Type: monohull
- Construction: glassfibre
- LOA: 49.51 ft (15.09 m)
- LWL: 41.01 ft (12.50 m)
- Beam: 14.17 ft (4.32 m)
- Engine: Volvo Penta 53 hp (40 kW) diesel engine

Hull appendages
- Keel: Fin keel
- Ballast: 12,100 lb (5,488 kg)
- Rudder: Spade-type rudder

Rig
- Rig type: Bermuda rig
- I foretriangle height: 64.96 ft (19.80 m)
- J foretriangle base: 18.21 ft (5.55 m)
- P mainsail luff: 57.91 ft (17.65 m)
- E mainsail foot: 19.03 ft (5.80 m)

Sails
- Sailplan: Masthead sloop
- Mainsail area: 551.01 sq ft (51.191 m^{2})
- Jib/genoa area: 591.46 sq ft (54.948 m^{2})
- Total sail area: 1,142.47 sq ft (106.139 m^{2})

Racing
- PHRF: 33-42

The Swan 48 Frers, also called the Swan 48-2 and the Swan 48-2 Frers, is a Finnish sailboat that was designed by Germán Frers as a blue water cruiser-racer and first built in 1995.

The design was originally marketed by the manufacturer as the Swan 48, but is now usually referred to as the Swan 48 Frers or Swan 48–2 to differentiate it from the unrelated 1971 Sparkman & Stephens Swan 48 design and the 2019 Swan 48-3 Frers.

The boat was also produced in a Swan 48R model for racing.

== Production ==
The design was built by Oy Nautor AB in Finland, from 1995 to 2002 with 57 boats completed, but it is now out of production.

== Design ==
The Swan 48 Frers is a recreational keelboat, built predominantly of glassfibre, with wood trim. It has a masthead sloop rig or optional fractional rig, a raked stem, a reverse transom, an internally mounted spade-type rudder controlled by a wheel and a fixed fin keel or optional centreboard and stub keel. It displaces 31,500 lb (14,288 kg) and carries 12,100 lb (5,488 kg) of lead ballast. A tall mast version was also available.

The boat has a draft of 7.81 ft (2.38 m) with the standard keel.

The Swan 48R racing version has a deeper keel, a fractional rig and a minimal racing interior to reduce weight.

The boat is fitted with a Swedish Volvo Penta diesel engine of 53 hp (40 kW) for docking and manoeuvring.

The design has sleeping accommodation for six people, with two sets of bunk beds in the bow cabin, an L-shaped settee and a straight settee in the main cabin and an aft cabin with a central double island berth. The galley is located on the port side just aft of the companionway ladder. The galley is of straight configuration and is equipped with a three-burner stove, an ice box and a sink. A navigation station is opposite the galley, on the starboard side. There are two heads, one just forward of the bow cabin in the forepeak and one on the starboard side, in the aft cabin.

For sailing downwind the design may be equipped with a symmetrical spinnaker.

The design has a hull speed of 8.58 kn (15.89 km/h) and a PHRF handicap of 33 to 42 with the fin keel, 39 to 60 with the centreboard and 27 with the fin keel and tall mast.

== Operational history ==
In a 2000 boats.com review, Robert Perry wrote, "So what is the Swan 48? It is a beautifully-designed, tooled, executed and outfitted touring boat that will blow the doors off most cruising boats. Swan has certainly retained its position as the ultimate expression of the mass-produced yacht, and for good reason ... Beautifully designed cruiser with a fast hull shape."

== See also ==
- List of sailing boat types
