= Swan 46 Mk I =

Sailboat class

Swan 46 Mark I
Development
- Designer: Germán Frers
- Location: Finland
- Year: 1983
- No. built: 109
- Builder: Oy Nautor AB
- Role: Cruiser-Racer
- Name: Swan 46 Mark I

Boat
- Displacement: 31,300 lb (14,197 kg)
- Draft: 8.20 ft (2.50 m)

Hull
- Type: monohull
- Construction: glassfibre
- LOA: 47.08 ft (14.35 m)
- LWL: 37.83 ft (11.53 m)
- Beam: 14.42 ft (4.40 m)
- Engine: Perkins Engines 50 hp (37 kW) diesel engine

Hull appendages
- Keel: Fin keel
- Ballast: 11,400 lb (5,171 kg)
- Rudder: Spade-type rudder

Rig
- Rig type: Bermuda rig
- I foretriangle height: 58.07 ft (17.70 m)
- J foretriangle base: 18.70 ft (5.70 m)
- P mainsail luff: 51.50 ft (15.70 m)
- E mainsail foot: 16.90 ft (5.15 m)

Sails
- Sailplan: Masthead sloop
- Mainsail area: 435.18 sq ft (40.430 m^{2})
- Jib/genoa area: 542.95 sq ft (50.442 m^{2})
- Total sail area: 978.13 sq ft (90.871 m^{2})

Racing
- PHRF: 63-72

The Swan 46 Mk I, also just called the Swan 46, is a Finnish sailboat that was designed by Germán Frers as a cruiser-racer and first built in 1983.

The design was originally marketed by the manufacturer as the Swan 46, but is now sometimes referred to as the Swan 46 Mk I to differentiate it from the improved 1989 Swan 46 Mk II and the unrelated 2004 Swan 46 Mk III design.

== Production ==
The design was built by Oy Nautor AB in Finland, from 1983 until 1997, with 109 boats completed, and average of 7.2 boats per year.

== Design ==
The Swan 46 is a recreational keelboat, built predominantly of glassfibre, with wood trim. It has a masthead sloop rig, a raked stem, a reverse transom, an internally mounted spade-type rudder controlled by a wheel and a fixed fin keel, optional shoal-draft keel or stub keel and centreboard. Tall, very tall, standard and short masts were also factory options. It displaces 31,300 lb (14,197 kg) and carries 11,400 lb (5,171 kg) of lead ballast.

The boat has a draft of 8.20 ft (2.50 m) with the standard fin keel and 5.6 ft (1.7 m) with the optional shoal draft keel, while the centreboard-equipped version has a draft of 9.0 ft (2.7 m) with the centreboard extended and 5.5 ft (1.7 m) with it retracted, allowing operation in shallow water.

The boat is fitted with a British Perkins Engines diesel engine of 50 hp (37 kW) for docking and manoeuvring. The fuel tank holds 99 U.S. gallons (370 L; 82 imp gal) and the fresh water tank has a capacity of 127 U.S. gallons (480 L; 106 imp gal).

The design has sleeping accommodation for six people, with a double "V"-berth in the bow cabin, a U-shaped settee and a straight settee in the main cabin along with two upper pilot berths and an aft cabin with a central double island berth. The galley is located on the port side just aft of the companionway ladder. The galley is of straight configuration and is equipped with a three-burner stove, an ice box and a double sink. A navigation station is opposite the galley, on the starboard side. There are two heads, one in the bow cabin on the port side and one on the starboard side in the aft cabin.

The design has a hull speed of 8.24 kn (15.26 km/h). The PHRF handicap for the standard mast is 63 to 72 for the fin keel model, 63 to 78 for the centreboard model and 66 to 72 for the shoal draft model. The short mast handicap is 75 with the shoal keel. With the tall mast the PHRF is 60 to 72 with the fin keel, 60 with the centreboard and 69 with the shoal keel. With the very tall mast and fin keel the PHRF is 54.

== Operational history ==
In a 2014 review in Sailing Magazine, Bob Pingel noted, "Frers loved the Swan 46 Mk I, saying the boat is 'beautifully responsive to sail, small enough for two or three competent crew to handle, yet big enough to accommodate a family of six in complete comfort.'"

In a 2015 Cruising World review, Karen Erikson wrote that the Swan 46, "is a fine ocean passagemaker. She sets beautifully into steep waves while the cabin remains a quiet haven, and with fingertip control, she steers like a dream. In our 2012 ARC Atlantic crossing, in perfect conditions, she charged across the Pond in an impressive 16 days to take the award for the fastest family boat."

== See also ==
- List of sailing boat types
