= Swan 46 Mk II =

Sailboat class

Development
- Designer: Germán Frers
- Location: Finland
- Year: 1989
- No. built: 28
- Builder: Oy Nautor AB
- Role: Cruiser-Racer
- Name: Swan 46 Mk II

Boat
- Displacement: 31,300 lb (14,197 kg)
- Draft: 8.20 ft (2.50 m)

Hull
- Type: monohull
- Construction: glassfibre
- LOA: 47.08 ft (14.35 m)
- LWL: 37.83 ft (11.53 m)
- Beam: 14.42 ft (4.40 m)
- Engine: Perkins Engines 50 hp (37 kW) diesel engine

Hull appendages
- Keel: Fin keel with weighted bulb
- Ballast: 11,400 lb (5,171 kg)
- Rudder: Spade-type rudder

Rig
- Rig type: Bermuda rig
- I foretriangle height: 58.07 ft (17.70 m)
- J foretriangle base: 18.70 ft (5.70 m)
- P mainsail luff: 51.50 ft (15.70 m)
- E mainsail foot: 16.90 ft (5.15 m)

Sails
- Sailplan: Masthead sloop
- Mainsail area: 435.18 sq ft (40.430 m^{2})
- Jib/genoa area: 542.95 sq ft (50.442 m^{2})
- Total sail area: 978.13 sq ft (90.871 m^{2})

Racing
- PHRF: 54-63

The Swan 46 Mk II is a Finnish sailboat that was designed by Germán Frers as a cruiser-racer and first built in 1989.

The Swan 46 Mk II is a development of the Swan 46 Mk I with a modified keel and other changes.

== Production ==
The design was built by Oy Nautor AB in Finland, from 1989 to 1997 with 28 boats completed, but it is now out of production.

== Design ==
The Swan 46 Mk II is a recreational keelboat, built predominantly of glassfibre, with wood trim. It has a masthead sloop rig, a raked stem, a reverse transom, an internally mounted spade-type rudder controlled by a wheel and a fixed fin keel with a weighted bulb or optional stub keel and retractable centreboard. It displaces 31,300 lb (14,197 kg) and carries 11,400 lb (5,171 kg) of lead ballast.

The keel-equipped version of the boat has a draft of 8.20 ft (2.50 m), while the centreboard-equipped version has a draft of 9.0 ft (2.7 m) with the centreboard extended and 5.5 ft (1.7 m) with it retracted, allowing operation in shallow water.

The boat is fitted with a British Perkins Engines diesel engine of 50 hp (37 kW) for docking and manoeuvring. The fuel tank holds 99 U.S. gallons (370 L; 82 imp gal) and the fresh water tank has a capacity of 127 U.S. gallons (480 L; 106 imp gal).

The design has sleeping accommodation for six people, with an off-set double berth in the bow cabin, two straight settees in the main cabin, along with a pilot berth and an aft cabin with a central double island berth. The galley is located on the port side just forward of the companionway ladder. The galley is of straight configuration and is equipped with a three-burner stove, an ice box and a double sink. A navigation station is opposite the galley, on the starboard side. There are two heads, one in the bow cabin on the port side and one on the starboard side aft.

The design has a hull speed of 8.24 kn (15.26 km/h) and a PHRF handicap of 54 to 63 with the fin keel.

== See also ==
- List of sailing boat types
