= Berrimilla II =

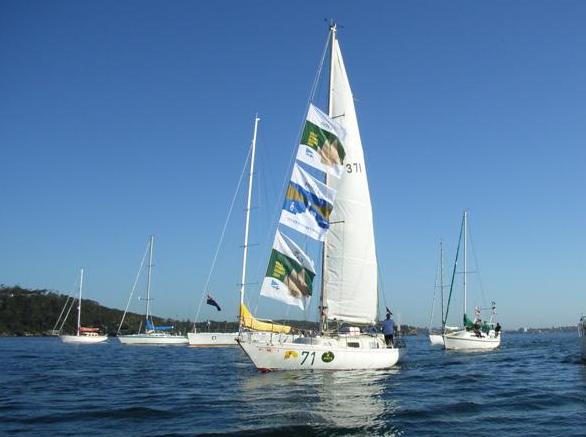
- Berrimilla arrives back in Sydney after her first circumnavigation, 21 December 2005
- Yacht club: Royal Australian Naval Sailing Association
- Nation: Australia
- Class: Brolga 33
- Designer(s): Peter Joubert
- Builder: Baker
- Launched: 1977

Specifications
- Type: Monohull
- Displacement: 6,933 kg
- Length: 10.1 m (33.14 ft)
- Beam: 3.1 m (10.17 ft)
- Draft: 1.8 m (5.91 ft)
- Sail area: Mainsail 21.43 m^{2} (231 sq ft); Fore triangle 39.25 m^{2} (422 sq ft); Spinnaker 88.09 m^{2} (948 sq ft)
- Crew: 2–6 crew

Berrimilla II is a 33 ft yacht, most famous for performing two remarkable circumnavigations and for being the 77th vessel to transit the North West Passage since Amundsen’s Gjoa in 1903–06; her transit was the 114th (some vessels have done more than one). She was owned and skippered by Australian yachtsman Alex Whitworth.

== 1st circumnavigation (Dec 26, 2004 – Jan 7, 2006) ==
Berrimilla's first circumnavigation began with the 2004 Sydney to Hobart Yacht Race, continued via an unscheduled stop in Dunedin, New Zealand, after a severe knockdown and on to Cape Horn and Port Stanley in the Falkland Islands/Malvinas.

Thence she sailed direct to Falmouth, Cornwall, UK, talking with the International Space Station Expedition 10 along the way.

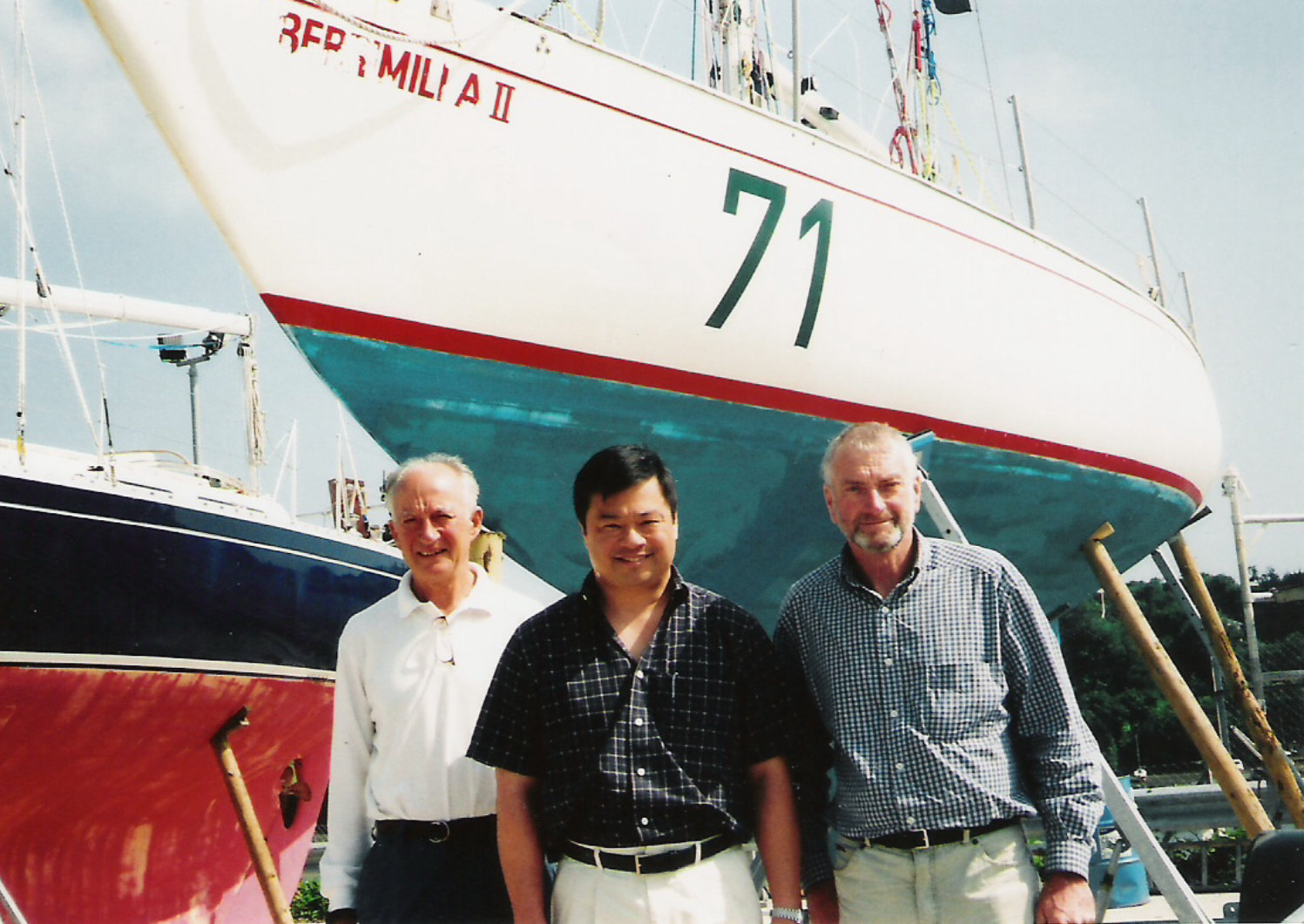
Orbiters meet. Leroy Chiao visits Berrimilla in Falmouth. Alex Whitworth, Leroy Chiao, Peter Crozier and Berrimilla.

She finished 11th overall and second in her division in the 2005 Fastnet race and returned direct from Falmouth to Hobart and then to Sydney in time to start in the 2005 Sydney to Hobart Yacht Race.

== 2nd circumnavigation (Apr 10, 2008 – Mar 16, 2010) ==
The voyage was first conceived as a passage from Sydney, Australia to Falmouth, UK via the North West Passage, with a stopover on Devon Island to meet up with a group of NASA scientists to witness a total solar eclipse of August 1, 2008. The scientists were part of the Haughton-Mars Project, hence Berrimilla's blog was titled "Berrimilla Down-Under-Mars".

Berrimilla's voyage started on April 10, 2008. She sailed direct to Alaska from Sydney and then via the North West Passage to Falmouth, UK where she was laid up for the winter. The original intention was to return north of Russia to the Bering Strait – the Northern Sea Route – but the permit to do so arrived too late to complete the voyage safely before the winter freeze. Berrimilla sailed her second 2009 Fastnet race and returned to Australia via Lisbon, Cape Town and the Kerguelen Islands in 2010.

== Crew ==
Alex Whitworth was Berrimilla's permanent skipper, and Peter Crozier, Corrie McQueen and Kimbra Lindus were part of the crew at different periods of two circumnavigations.

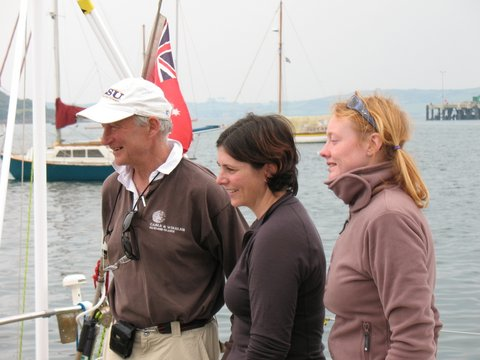
The first crew ever to sail from Australia to England via the North West Passage arrived in Falmouth, September 22, 2008. Left to right: Alex Whitworth, Kimbra Lindus, Corrie McQueen.

== Records ==
During the two circumnavigations Berrimilla became the first and the only vessel to:

- Sandwich a Fastnet race between two consecutive Sydney to Hobart Yacht Race, all under sail
- Sail to England twice to compete in the Fastnet race and then return
- Sail from Australia to England via the North West Passage
- Circumnavigate the world under sail via the North West Passage
- Circumnavigate the world via both Cape Horn and the North West Passage. David Scott Cowper did it first, but in different boats.

In the disastrous 1998 Sydney to Hobart Yacht Race, Berrimilla placed 1st in PHS Division.
