= Shockwave (2000 yacht) =

Sail racing yacht

- Designer(s): Reichel/Pugh
- Launched: 2000
- Owner(s): Neville Crichton; Andrew Short
- Fate: Sunk in 2009.

Specifications
- Length: 24.4 m (80 ft)

Shockwave was a 24.4m sail racing yacht built in 2000. At the time of her construction she was the biggest racing yacht in the world. Designed by United States naval architects Reichel/Pugh, the yacht, including the hull, rudder, mast and boom, mainsail and headsails, was made of carbon fibre.

On 10 October 2009, at around 2.30am, while taking part in the annual Flinders Islet Race, she apparently grounded near Flinders Islet, New South Wales, Australia during moderate weather (though at a time of heavy 2.3m high swells). Despite multi-hour rescue operations that enabled 16 crew members to be taken to safety by helicopter from the islet where most had taken refuge, two - the owner, Andrew Short, and the navigator Sally Gordon - died from injuries or hypothermia. The two, as well as a third person Andrew's son Nicholas Short who was recovered alive, have been reported as having been swept overboard by the boom of the yacht after it hit the rocks. Andrew Short had only recently purchased the yacht from original owner New Zealander millionaire Neville Crichton, but he and his crew were described as having been very experienced.

Approximate Position 34.4572°S 150.9310°E
