= Sydney 40 =

Class of yacht

Boat
- Draft: 2.68 m (8.8 ft)

Hull
- Hull weight: 5,750 kg (12,680 lb)
- LOA: 12.5 m (41 ft)
- LWL: 10.75 m (35.3 ft)
- Beam: 3.7 m (12 ft)

Sails
- Upwind sail area: 92 m^{2} (990 sq ft)

The Sydney 40 was designed by Iain Murray and built by Sydney Yachts in the late 1990s.

== History ==
The Sydney 40 was chosen from the design board by the Royal Ocean Racing Club to become the new One Design class for the Admiral's Cup. The class never really took off for a variety of reasons this led to the failure of the management company Race 1. The boat had a highly tunable rig and was hard to sail well rewarding the most experience crews. The class was allowed to hold a World Championship by the International Sailing Federation, which ran for two years. It was held off the Isle of Wight in 1999 and off Mallorca in 2000.

== Events ==
=== World Champions ===
Event	Gold	Silver	Bronze
1999 Cowes	Merit Cup (ITA); Vasco Vascotto		
2000 Palma	Cacadu Sailing Team SPA; Miguel Puigserver		
