= 1997 Sydney to Hobart Yacht Race =

1997 annual yacht race in Australia

53rd Sydney to Hobart Yacht Race
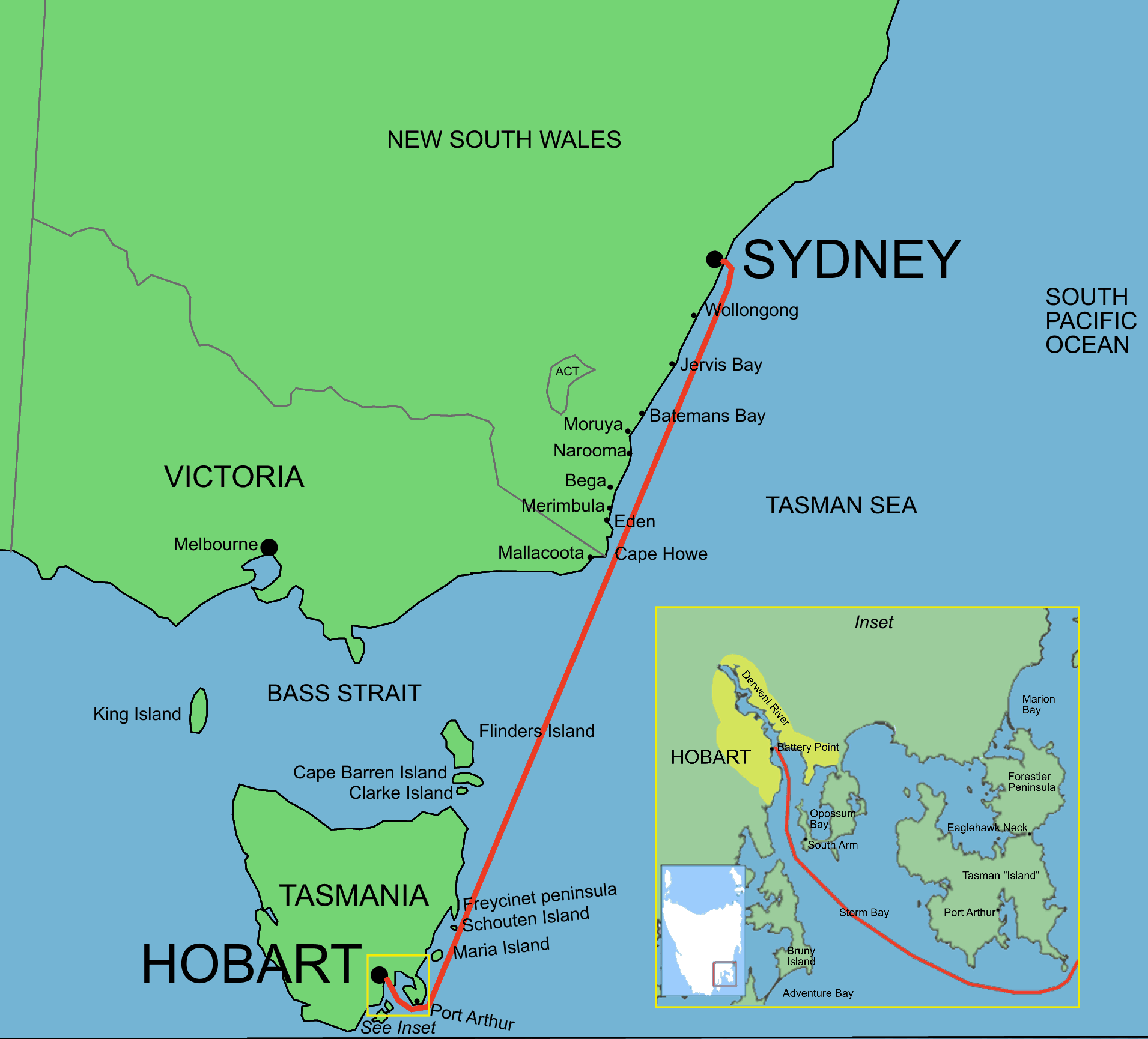

Event information
- Type: Yacht
- Dates: 26 December 1997 - 2 January 1998
- Sponsor: Telstra
- Host city: Sydney, Hobart
- Boats: 114
- Distance: 628 nautical miles (1,163 km)
- Website: Rolex Sydney Hobart

Results
- Winner (1997): Brindabella (George Snow)

Succession
- Previous: Morning Glory (Hasso Plattner) in 1996
- Next: Sayonara (Larry Ellison) in 1998

The 1997 Sydney to Hobart Yacht Race, sponsored by Telstra, was the 53rd annual running of the "blue water classic" Sydney to Hobart Yacht Race. As in past editions of the race, it was hosted by the Cruising Yacht Club of Australia based in Sydney, New South Wales. As with previous Sydney to Hobart Yacht Races, the 1997 edition began on Sydney Harbour, at noon on Boxing Day (26 December 1997), before heading south for 630 nautical miles (1,170 km) through the Tasman Sea, past Bass Strait, into Storm Bay and up the River Derwent, to cross the finish line in Hobart, Tasmania.

The 1997 fleet comprised 114 starters of which 99 completed the race and 15 yachts retired.

== Results ==
=== Line Honours results (Top 10) ===
Position	Sail number	Yacht	State/Country	Yacht type	LOA (Metres)	Skipper	Elapsed time d:hh:mm:ss	Ref
1	C1	Brindabella	New South Wales	Jutson 75 Maxi	22.85	George Snow	2:23:37:12	
2	HKG 88	Exile	Hong Kong	Reichel Pugh Pocket Maxi	20.00	Warwick Millar	2:23:46:40	
3	SM1	P.L. Lease Future Shock	(Victoria (state)) Victoria	Elliot 56	16.96	Peter Hansen	3:04:59:56	
4	SA 1431	Marchioness	New South Wales	Lavranos Maxi Sloop	22.80	Anthony Beilby	3:05:15:58	
5	AUS 70	Ragamuffin	New South Wales	Farr 50	15.15	Syd Fischer	3:07:42:44	
6	HKG 1997	Beau Geste	Hong Kong	Farr 49	15.74	Karl Kwok	3:07:42:50	
7	SWE 2001	Nicorette	Sweden	Ribadeau-Dumas Hannerberg IHS Maxi	21.78	Ludde Ingvall	3:07:59:22	
8	M250	Seac Banche	Italy	Farr IMS 50	15.75	Adan Ricci	3:09:12:10	
9	SM100	Ausmaid	(Victoria (state)) Victoria	Farr 47	14.49	Giorgio Gjergja	3:09:36:14	
10	S4606	Motorola Young Australia	(Victoria (state)) Victoria	Nelson-Marek NM46 IMS Racer	14.20	Lawrence Shannon	3:13:13:01	

=== Handicap results (Top 10) ===
Position	Sail number	Yacht	State/Country	Yacht type	LOA (Metres)	Skipper	Corrected time d:hh:mm:ss	Ref
1	HKG 1997	Beau Geste	Hong Kong	Farr 49	15.74	Karl Kwok	2:17:21:27	
2	AUS 70	Ragamuffin	New South Wales	Farr 50	15.15	Syd Fischer	2:17:42:53	
3	SM100	Ausmaid	(Victoria (state)) Victoria	Farr 47	14.49	Giorgio Gjergja	2:17:44:54	
4	HKG 88	Exile	Hong Kong	Reichel Pugh Pocket Maxi	20.00	Warwick Millar	2:18:43:29	
5	B2000	Brighton Star	(Victoria (state)) Victoria	Reichel Pugh 45	13.57	David Gotze	2:20:41:57	
6	S4606	Motorola Young Australia	(Victoria (state)) Victoria	Nelson-Marek NM46 IMS Racer	14.20	Lawrence Shannon	2:20:44:40	
7	9797	Ninety Seven	New South Wales	Farr 47	14.32	Andrew Strachan	2:20:54:19	
8	8887	Australian Challenge 2000	New South Wales	Murray Sydney 46 IMS Racer	13.93	Ray Roberts	2:20:58:31	
9	C1	Brindabella	New South Wales	Jutson 75 Maxi	22.85	George Snow	2:22:36:37	
10	IRL 8000	Atara	New South Wales	Lyons 43	12.99	Roger Hickman; John Storey	2:23:35:43	
