= Alex Whitworth =

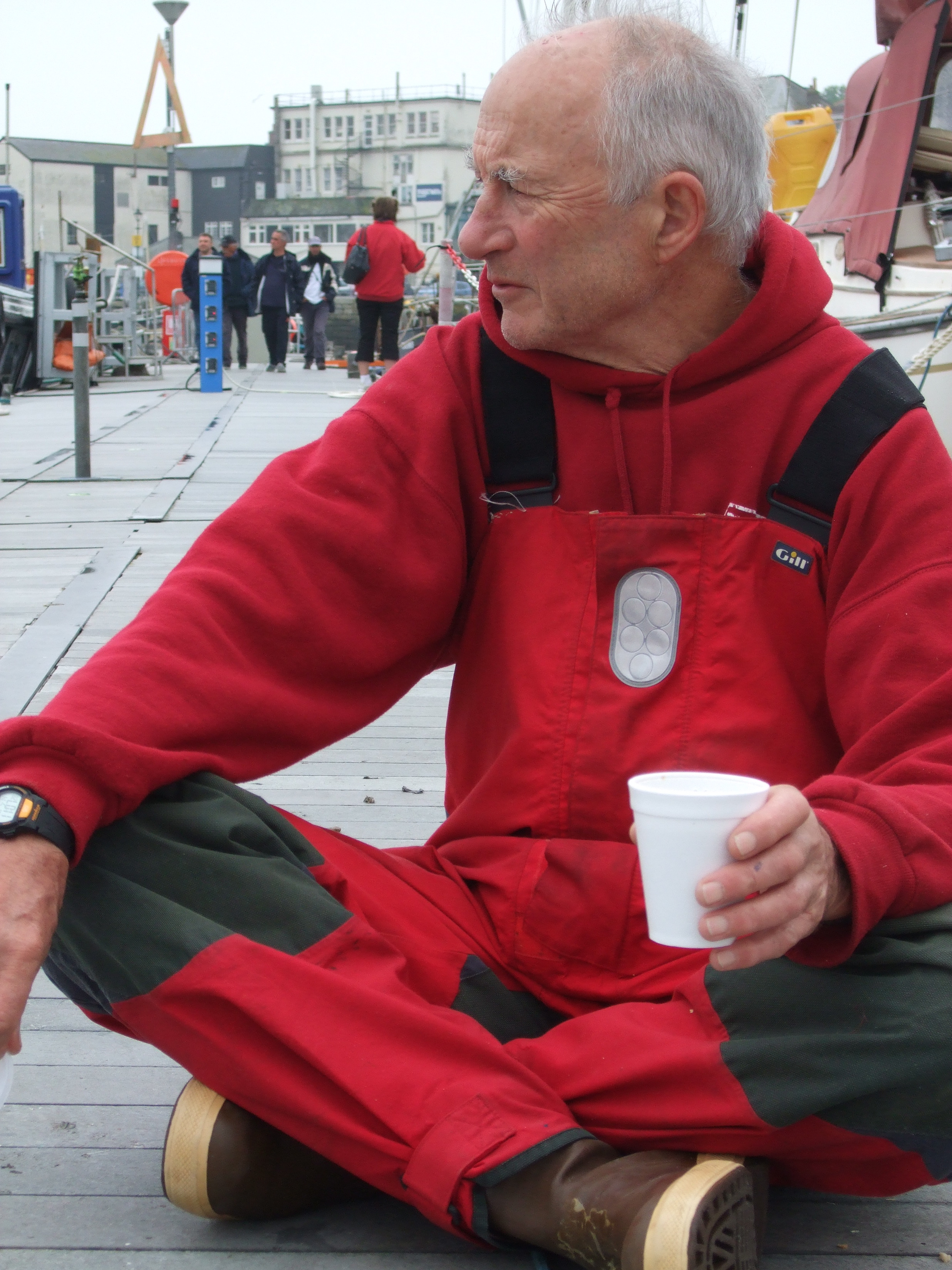
- Alex Whitworth, Falmouth, 14 May 2009
- Born: 22 April 1942 (age 83); Malta
- Website: berrimilla.com/wordpress/

Alex Whitworth (born 22 April 1942 in Malta) is best known as an Australian sailor . Between 2005 and 2010 he sailed double handed twice around the world in Berrimilla II, a Brolga-class 33 ft sailing boat.

The first circumnavigation was around Cape Horn from Sydney to England and back around Africa, during which he communicated with Astronaut Dr. Leroy Chiao, the commander of Expedition 10 on the International Space Station. The second, via the North West Passage, evolved from Whitworth's contact with the Space Station and a later meeting with Dr. Pascal Lee who runs NASA's Haughton Mars Camp on Devon Island. Dr. Lee invited Whitworth to rendezvous at the Camp for the total solar eclipse of 1 August 2008. Berrimilla II started and finished the first circumnavigation with a Sydney – Hobart race and sailed double-handed in the Fastnet Race on both. Whitworth posted daily blogs on his website which were followed widely by people around the world and reposted or reported on other websites and in the press.

Berrimilla II's co-skipper for the first circumnavigation and the return half of the second was Peter Crozier. Corrie McQueen sailed the Pacific leg of the second and was joined by Kimbra Lindus from Dutch Harbour to Falmouth.

As far as it is possible to ascertain, amongst other achievements, Berrimilla II was the first vessel ever to sail from Australia to England via the North West Passage and the first to circumnavigate via the North West Passage under sail. Whitworth received several awards for these voyages, including, in 2009, the Ocean Cruising Club Barton Cup and, in 2010, the Cruising Club of America's Blue Water Medal for a circumnavigation of the world via the Northwest Passage West to East.

When not at sea Whitworth teaches safety and sea survival to offshore sailors. During his professional career, he worked both in the Public Service and in private industry. He is a Fellow of the University of Wollongong. He has run about 30 marathons, including the Stanley Marathon in the Falkland Islands during the first circumnavigation. His best time was 2hr 41 minutes in 1985.
