= Swan 48 =

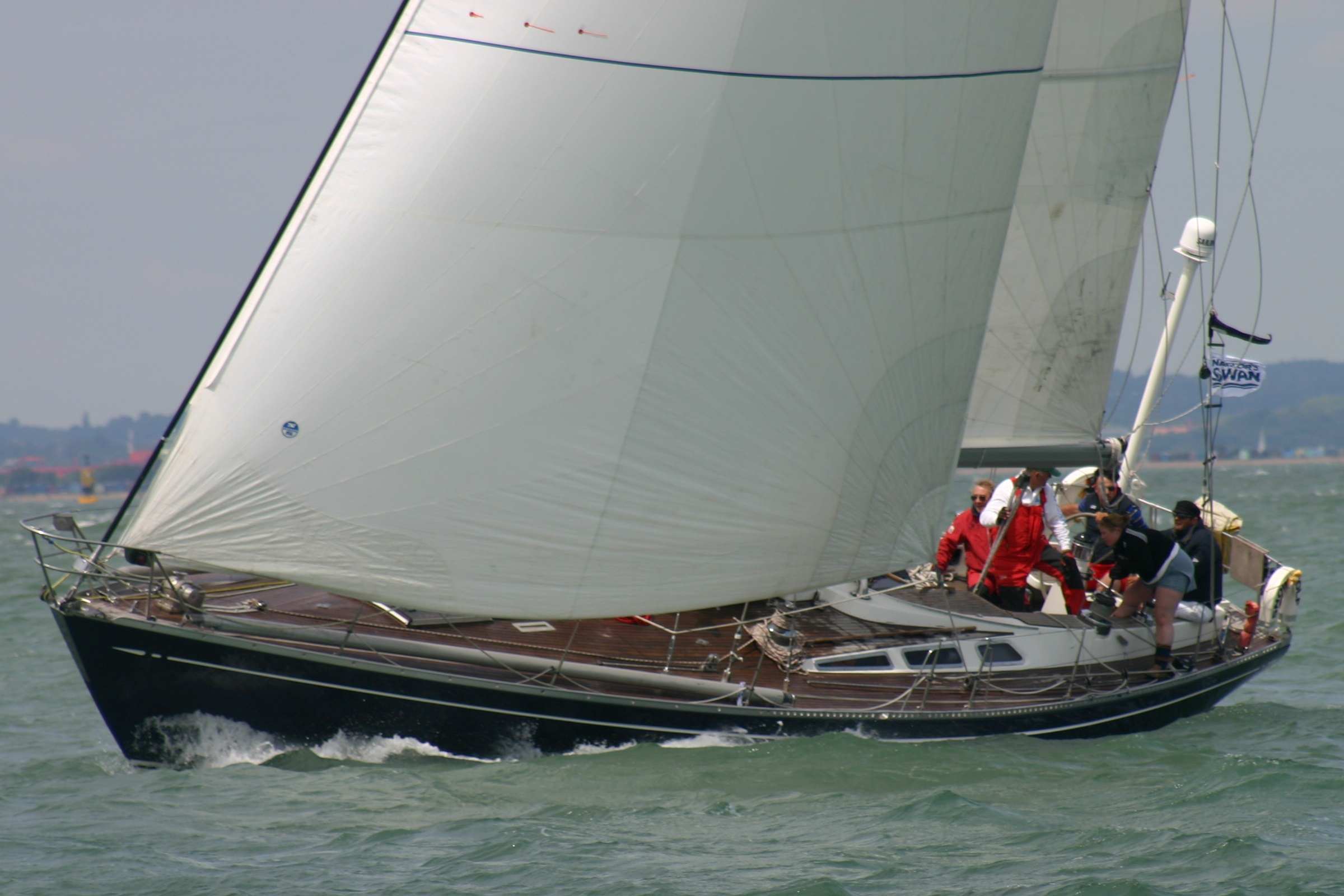
- Swan 48 Snow Wolf GBR7635T at the 2011 Swan Europeans in Cowes (GBR) held by the Royal Yacht Squadron

Development
- Designer: Sparkman & Stephens
- Year: 1971-1975
- Name: Swan 48

Boat
- Displacement: 36,000 lb (16,000 kg)
- Draft: 8 ft 0 in (2.44 m)

Hull
- Type: Keelboat
- Construction: GRP
- LOA: 47 ft 11 in (14.61 m)
- LWL: 37 ft 3 in (11.35 m)
- Beam: 13 ft 8 in (4.17 m)

Hull appendages
- Keel: Fin keel with skeg hung rudder

Rig
- Rig type: Sloop
- Mast height: 62 ft 0 in (18.90 m)

Sails
- Mainsail area: 436 sq ft (40.5 m^{2})
- Spinnaker area: 2,250 sq ft (209 m^{2})

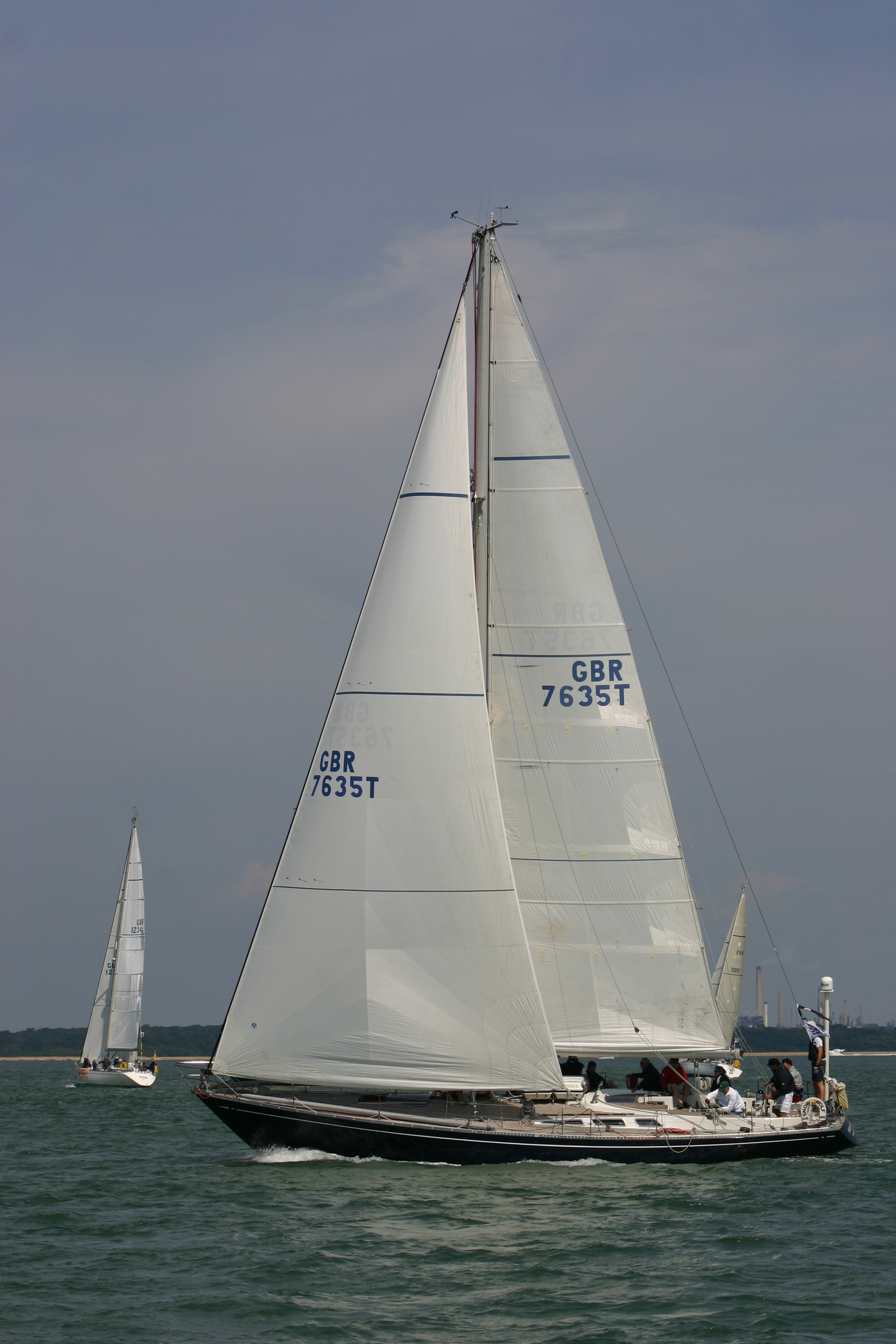
Swan 48 Snow Wolf GBR7635T at the 2011 Swan Europeans in Cowes (GBR) held by the Royal Yacht Squadron

Swan 48 is a GRP constructed, fin keeled, masthead sloop or yawl designed by Sparkman & Stephens with a design number 2079 and manufactured by Nautor Oy. The original 48 was designed to rate under the I.O.R. and at the same time to offer the comforts of a great cruising boat. Because of this design criteria and its extremely strong structure Swan 48 suits very well for trans ocean racing as well as comfortable cruising and even circumnavigating the world. It was in production between 1971 and 1975 with 46 hulls built in total. It is not to be confused with a German Frers designed Swan 48 model which was in production between 1995 and 2003. The original S&S designed Swan 48 is famous for its two wins in the Newport-Bermuda Race; 'Noryema VIII' in 1972 (the first non-US yacht ever to win the Bermuda Race) and 'Constellation' in 1992. In the US market Swan 48 was also marketed as Palmer Johnson PJ48.
