= Brindabella (yacht) =

Maxi yacht built in Australia

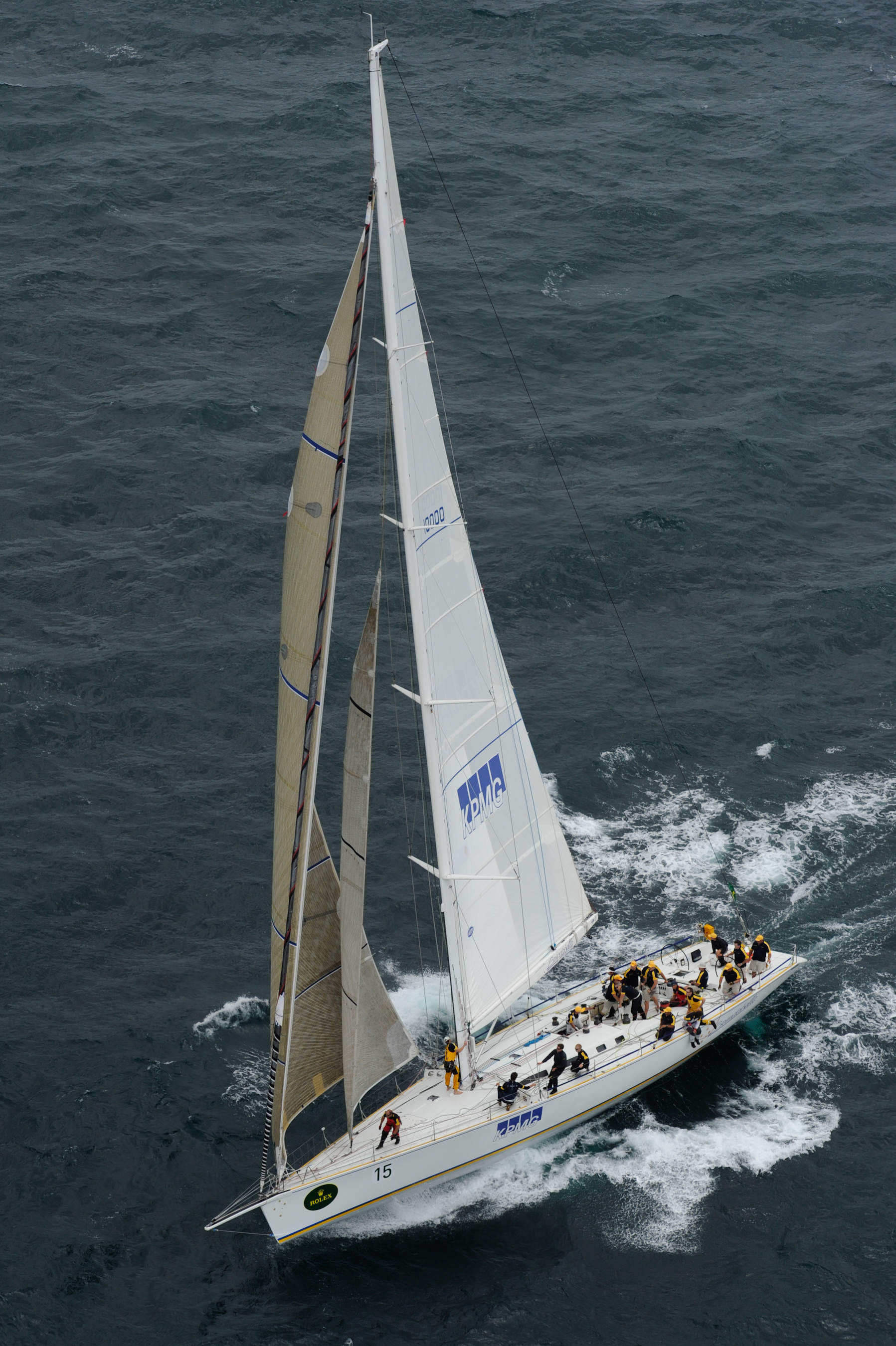
- Brindabella racing offshore (2011)
- Nation: Australia
- Class: Maxi
- Designer(s): Scott Jutson
- Builder: Boatspeed
- Launched: 1993

Racing career
- Notable victories: 1997 Sydney–Hobart (l.h.)

Specifications
- Type: Monohull
- Length: 79 ft
- Draft: 4.3m

Brindabella is a maxi yacht. It won line honours in the 1997 Sydney to Hobart Yacht Race as well as breaking the race record for a conventionally ballasted yacht in 1999.

Described as "Australia’s most famous maxi" and "The people's maxi". She was designed by Scott Jutson in 1993 under the IMS handicap system as a 75 foot maxi and later underwent structural changes including the addition of a bowsprit, and a "scoop" transom.

She has broken many records of races continuing and discontinued, some of which are the Sydney to Hobart record for a conventionally ballasted yacht (1999), the Sydney to Wollongong race, Bird island, Cabbage Tree Island, Sydney Noumea, Sydney Moolooolaba, and Sydney Gold Coast races.

Brindabella is now owned by John Hilhorst and Brigid Dighton in Adelaide, where she is used as a charter vessel.
