= Swan 53 Mk I =

Sailboat class

Swan 53
Development
- Designer: Germán Frers
- Location: Finland
- Year: 1987
- No. built: 50
- Builder: Oy Nautor AB
- Role: Cruiser-Racer
- Name: Swan 53

Boat
- Displacement: 44,000 lb (19,958 kg)
- Draft: 10.20 ft (3.11 m)

Hull
- Type: monohull
- Construction: glassfibre
- LOA: 53.00 ft (16.15 m)
- LWL: 43.06 ft (13.12 m)
- Beam: 15.51 ft (4.73 m)
- Engine: Volvo TMD31A diesel engine

Hull appendages
- Keel: Fin keel
- Ballast: 18,518 lb (8,400 kg)
- Rudder: Spade-type rudder

Rig
- Rig type: Bermuda rig
- I foretriangle height: 69.40 ft (21.15 m)
- J foretriangle base: 21.00 ft (6.40 m)
- P mainsail luff: 61.90 ft (18.87 m)
- E mainsail foot: 19.80 ft (6.04 m)

Sails
- Sailplan: Masthead sloop
- Mainsail area: 612.81 sq ft (56.932 m^{2})
- Jib/genoa area: 728.70 sq ft (67.698 m^{2})
- Total sail area: 1,341.51 sq ft (124.630 m^{2})

Racing
- PHRF: 21-45

The Swan 53, sometimes called the Swan 53 Mk I, is a Finnish sailboat that was designed by Germán Frers as a cruiser-racer and first built in 1987.

The design was later replaced in production by a new Frers design, the Swan 52-2 or Mk II in 2004.

== Production ==
The design was built by Oy Nautor AB in Finland, from 1987 to 1995 with 50 boats completed, but it is now out of production.

== Design ==
The Swan 53 is a recreational keelboat, built predominantly of glassfibre, with wood trim. It has a masthead sloop rig, a raked stem, a reverse transom, an internally mounted spade-type rudder controlled by a wheel and a fixed fin keel or optional stub keel and centreboard. It displaces 44,000 lb (19,958 kg) and carries 18,518 lb (8,400 kg) of lead ballast. A tall mast was also available.

The keel-equipped version of the boat has a draft of 10.20 ft (3.11 m), while the centreboard-equipped version has a draft of 11.7 ft (3.6 m) with the centreboard extended and 7.1 ft (2.2 m) with it retracted, allowing operation in shallow water.

The boat is fitted with a Swedish Volvo TMD31A diesel engine for docking and manoeuvring. The fuel tank holds 106 U.S. gallons (400 L; 88 imp gal) and the fresh water tank has a capacity of 200 U.S. gallons (760 L; 170 imp gal).

The design has sleeping accommodation for six people, with a set of bunk beds in each of two forward cabins, an L-shaped settee and a straight settee in the main cabin and an aft cabin with a centred double island berth. The galley is located on the port side just aft of the companionway ladder. The galley is of straight configuration and is equipped with a four-burner stove, an ice box and a sink. A navigation station is opposite the galley, on the starboard side. There are two heads, one just forward of the bow cabin in the forepeak and one on the starboard side, aft.

The design has a hull speed of 8.79 kn (16.28 km/h) and a PHRF handicap of 21 to 45.

== See also ==
- List of sailing boat types
