= Swan 53 Mk II =

Sailboat class

Swan 53-2
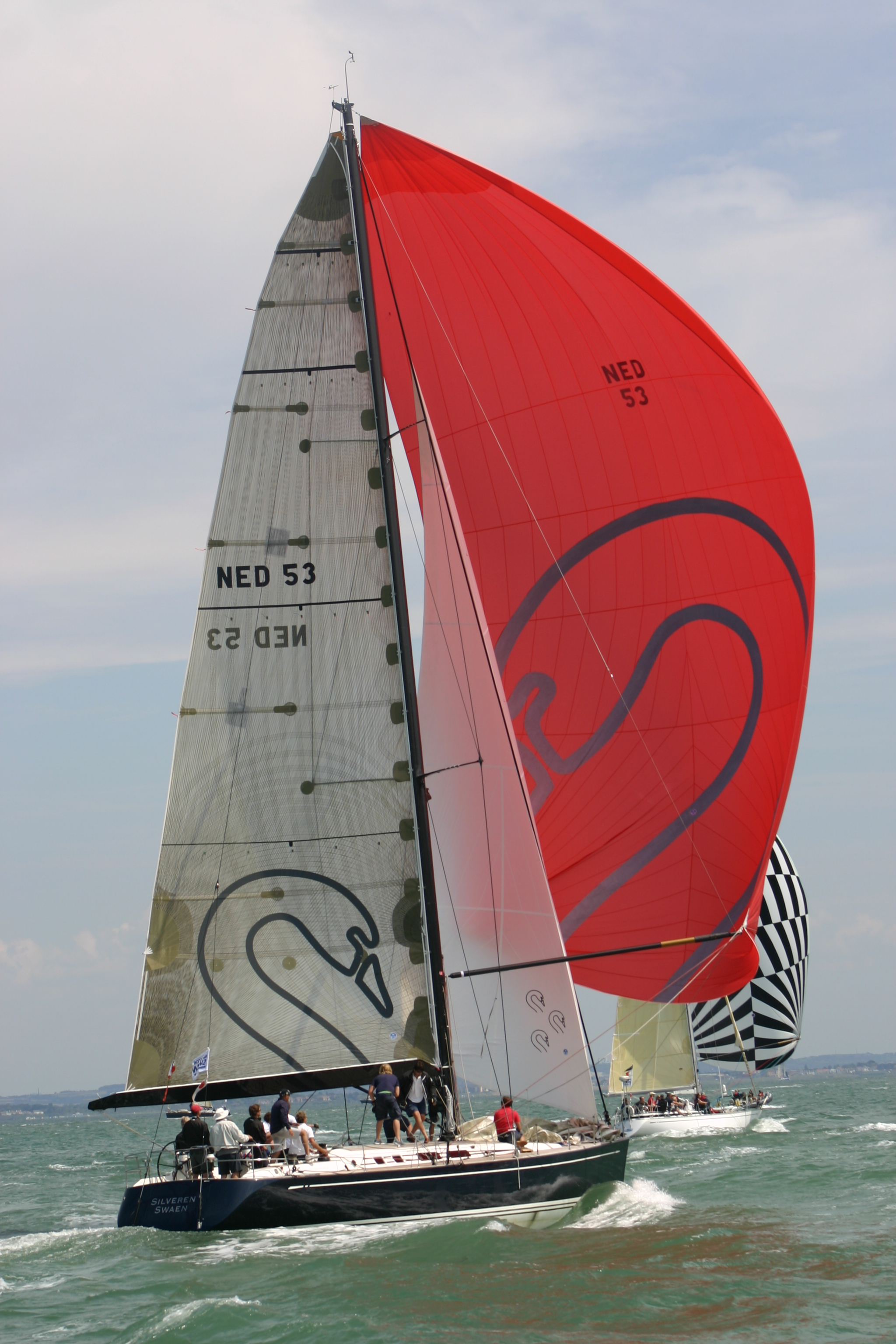

Development
- Designer: Germán Frers
- Location: Finland
- Year: 2005
- No. built: 20
- Builder: Oy Nautor AB
- Role: Cruiser
- Name: Swan 53-2

Boat
- Displacement: 48,501 lb (22,000 kg)
- Draft: 8.01 ft (2.44 m)

Hull
- Type: monohull
- Construction: glassfibre
- LOA: 54.07 ft (16.48 m)
- LWL: 47.24 ft (14.40 m)
- Beam: 15.58 ft (4.75 m)
- Engine: Yanmar diesel engine

Hull appendages
- Keel: Fin keel withj weighted bulb
- Ballast: 18,078 lb (8,200 kg)
- Rudder: Spade-type rudder

Rig
- Rig type: Bermuda rig
- I foretriangle height: 71.95 ft (21.93 m)
- J foretriangle base: 19.52 ft (5.95 m)
- P mainsail luff: 65.88 ft (20.08 m)
- E mainsail foot: 21.98 ft (6.70 m)

Sails
- Sailplan: Masthead sloop
- Mainsail area: 724.02 sq ft (67.264 m^{2})
- Jib/genoa area: 702.23 sq ft (65.239 m^{2})
- Total sail area: 1,426.25 sq ft (132.503 m^{2})

The Swan 53-2, also called the Swan 53 Mk II, is a Finnish sailboat that was designed by Germán Frers as a blue water cruiser and first built in 2005.

The design was originally marketed by the manufacturer as the Swan 53, but is now usually referred to as the Swan 53-2 or Mk II, to differentiate it from Frers' unrelated 1987 Swan 53 Mk I design.

The boat is a developed into the Swan 54, using the same hull design.

== Production ==
The design was built by Oy Nautor AB in Finland, from 2005 to 2009 with 20 boats completed, but it is now out of production.

== Design ==
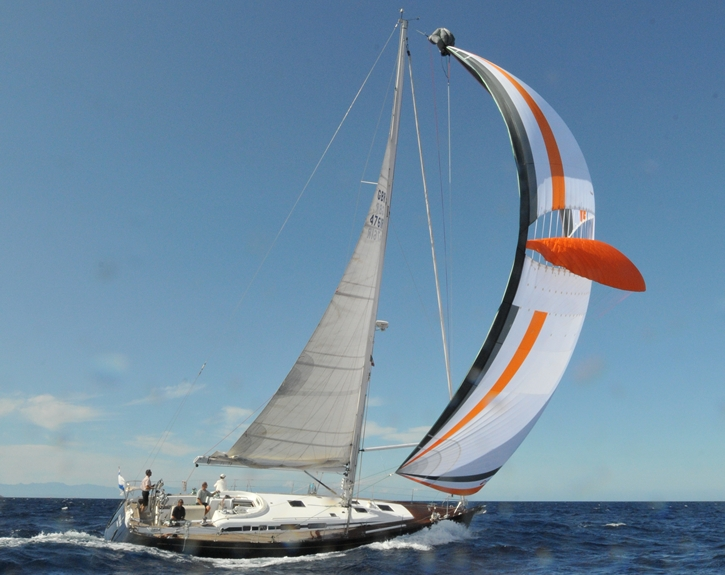
Swan 53-2

The Swan 53-2 is a recreational keelboat, built predominantly of glassfibre, with wood trim. It has a masthead sloop rig, with two sets of swept spreaders. The hull has a raked stem plumb stem, a reverse transom, an internally mounted spade-type rudder controlled by dual wheels and a fixed fin keel or optional stub keel and daggerboard. It displaces 48,501 lb (22,000 kg) and carries 18,078 lb (8,200 kg) of lead ballast in the fin keel version and 22,400 lb (10,160 kg) of ballast in the daggerboard model.

The keel-equipped version of the boat has a draft of 8.01 ft (2.44 m), while the daggerboard-equipped version has a draft of 12.14 ft (3.70 m) with the board extended and 4.59 ft (1.40 m) with it retracted, allowing operation in shallow water.

The boat is fitted with a Japanese Yanmar diesel engine for docking and manoeuvring. The fuel tank holds 131 U.S. gallons (500 L; 109 imp gal) and the fresh water tank has a capacity of 181 U.S. gallons (690 L; 151 imp gal).

The design has sleeping accommodation for eight people, with a double island berth in the bow cabin, a double berth to port in the forward cabin, an L-shaped settee and a straight settee in the main cabin and two aft cabins, each with a double berth. The galley is located on the starboard side just forward of the companionway ladder. The galley is L-shaped and is equipped with a three-burner stove, an ice box and a double sink. There are three heads, two just aft of the bow cabin on the starboard side and one on the port side, aft.

For sailing downwind the design may be equipped with a symmetrical spinnaker. The boat has a hull speed of 9.21 kn (17.06 km/h).

== See also ==
- List of sailing boat types
