= Sun Odyssey 34 =

Sailboat class

Development
- Designer: Daniel Andrieu
- Location: France
- Year: 1991
- Builder: Jeanneau
- Role: Cruiser
- Name: Sun Odyssey 34

Boat
- Displacement: 10,362 lb (4,700 kg)
- Draft: 6.25 ft (1.91 m)

Hull
- Type: monohull
- Construction: fiberglass
- LOA: 33.79 ft (10.30 m)
- LWL: 26.38 ft (8.04 m)
- Beam: 11.48 ft (3.50 m)
- Engine: Yanmar diesel engine

Hull appendages
- Keel: fin keel with weighted bulb
- Ballast: 3,351 lb (1,520 kg)
- Rudder: spade-type rudder

Rig
- Rig type: Bermuda rig
- I foretriangle height: 40.68 ft (12.40 m)
- J foretriangle base: 11.65 ft (3.55 m)
- P mainsail luff: 34.45 ft (10.50 m)
- E mainsail foot: 13.62 ft (4.15 m)

Sails
- Sailplan: fractional rigged sloop
- Mainsail area: 234.60 sq ft (21.795 m^{2})
- Jib/genoa area: 236.96 sq ft (22.014 m^{2})
- Total sail area: 471.57 sq ft (43.810 m^{2})

The Sun Odyssey 34 is a French sailboat that was designed by Daniel Andrieu as a cruiser and first built in 1991.

The design is a development of the 1989 Andrieu-designed Sun Liberty 34 and related to the 1992 Sun Odyssey 33.

== Production ==
The design was built by Jeanneau in France, from 1991 juntil 1993, but it is now out of production.

== Design ==
The Sun Odyssey 34 is a recreational keelboat, built predominantly of fiberglass, with wood trim. It has a fractional sloop rig, a raked stem, a reverse transom, an internally mounted spade-type rudder and a fixed fin keel or optional shoal-draft keel. It displaces 10,362 lb (4,700 kg) and carries 3,351 lb (1,520 kg) of ballast.

The boat has a draft of 6.25 ft (1.91 m) with the standard keel and 4.92 ft (1.50 m) with the optional shoal draft keel.

The boat is fitted with a Japanese Yanmar diesel engine for docking and maneuvering. The fuel tank holds 26 U.S. gallons (98 L; 22 imp gal) and the fresh water tank has a capacity of 54 U.S. gallons (200 L; 45 imp gal).

The design has sleeping accommodation for six people, with a double "V"-berth in the bow cabin, a U-shaped settee and a straight settee in the main cabin and an aft cabin with a double berth on the starboard side. The galley is located on the port side just aft of the companionway ladder. The galley is L-shaped and is equipped with a two-burner stove, an ice box and a double sink. A navigation station is forward of the galley, on the port side. There are two heads, one just aft of the bow cabin on the starboard side and one on the starboard side just forward of the aft cabin.

The design has a hull speed of 6.88 kn (12.74 km/h).

== See also ==
- List of sailing boat types
