= Sun Liberty 34 =

Sailboat class

Development
- Designer: Daniel Andrieu
- Location: France
- Year: 1989
- No. built: 284
- Builder: Jeanneau
- Role: Cruiser
- Name: Sun Liberty 34

Boat
- Displacement: 10,362 lb (4,700 kg)
- Draft: 6.23 ft (1.90 m)

Hull
- Type: monohull
- Construction: fiberglass
- LOA: 32.74 ft (9.98 m)
- LWL: 26.38 ft (8.04 m)
- Beam: 11.48 ft (3.50 m)
- Engine: Yanmar 27 hp (20 kW) diesel engine

Hull appendages
- Keel: fin keel with weighted bulb
- Ballast: 3,351 lb (1,520 kg)
- Rudder: spade-type rudder

Rig
- Rig type: Bermuda rig
- I foretriangle height: 40.68 ft (12.40 m)
- J foretriangle base: 11.65 ft (3.55 m)
- P mainsail luff: 34.49 ft (10.51 m)
- E mainsail foot: 13.62 ft (4.15 m)

Sails
- Sailplan: masthead sloop
- Mainsail area: 287 sq ft (26.7 m^{2})
- Jib/genoa area: 374 sq ft (34.7 m^{2})
- Spinnaker area: 815 sq ft (75.7 m^{2})
- Upwind sail area: 661 sq ft (61.4 m^{2})
- Downwind sail area: 1,102 sq ft (102.4 m^{2})

The Sun Liberty 34 is a French sailboat that was designed by Daniel Andrieu as a cruiser and first built in 1989.

The Sun Liberty 34 design was developed into the Sun Odyssey 34 in 1991 and the Sun Odyssey 33 in 1992.

== Production ==
The design was built by Jeanneau in France, from 1989 until 1992, with 284 boats built, but it is now out of production.

== Design ==
The Sun Liberty 34 is a recreational keelboat, built predominantly of polyester fiberglass, with wood trim. It has a masthead sloop rig, with a deck-stepped mast, two sets of swept spreaders and aluminum spars with stainless steel wire rigging. The hull has a raked stem, a reverse transom with steps to a swimming platform, an internally mounted spade-type rudder controlled by a wheel and a fixed fin keel or optional shoal-draft keel. It displaces 10,362 lb (4,700 kg) and carries 3,351 lb (1,520 kg) of ballast.

The boat has a draft of 6.23 ft (1.90 m) with the standard keel and 4.62 ft (1.41 m) with the optional shoal draft keel.

The boat is fitted with a Japanese Yanmar diesel engine of 27 hp (20 kW) for docking and maneuvering. The fuel tank holds 26 U.S. gallons (98 L; 22 imp gal) and the fresh water tank has a capacity of 66 U.S. gallons (250 L; 55 imp gal).

The design has sleeping accommodation for six people, with a double "V"-berth in the bow cabin, an U-shaped settee and a straight settee in the main cabin and an aft cabin with a double berth on the starboard side. The galley is located on the port side just aft of the companionway ladder. The galley is L-shaped and is equipped with a two-burner stove, an ice box and a double sink. A navigation station is forward of the galley, on the port side. There are two heads, one just aft of the bow cabin on the straboard side and one on the starboard side just forward of the aft cabin. Cabin maximum headroom is 69 in (175 cm).

For sailing downwind the design may be equipped with a symmetrical spinnaker of 815 sq ft (75.7 m^{2}).

The design has a hull speed of 6.88 kn (12.74 km/h).

== See also ==
- List of sailing boat types
