= Sun Odyssey 33 =

Sailboat class

Development
- Designer: Daniel Andrieu
- Location: United States
- Year: 1992
- Builder: Jeanneau
- Role: Cruiser

Boat
- Displacement: 10,362 lb (4,700 kg)
- Draft: 6.46 ft (1.97 m)

Hull
- Type: monohull
- Construction: fiberglass
- LOA: 33.79 ft (10.30 m)
- LWL: 26.38 ft (8.04 m)
- Beam: 11.48 ft (3.50 m)
- Engine: 18 hp (13 kW) diesel engine

Hull appendages
- Keel: fin keel
- Ballast: 3,444 lb (1,562 kg)
- Rudder: internally-mounted spade-type rudder

Rig
- Rig type: Bermuda rig
- I foretriangle height: 41.08 ft (12.52 m)
- J foretriangle base: 11.48 ft (3.50 m)
- P mainsail luff: 35.10 ft (10.70 m)
- E mainsail foot: 11.15 ft (3.40 m)

Sails
- Sailplan: fractional rigged sloop
- Mainsail area: 195.68 sq ft (18.179 m^{2})
- Jib/genoa area: 235.80 sq ft (21.907 m^{2})
- Total sail area: 431.48 sq ft (40.086 m^{2})

The Sun Odyssey 33 is a French sailboat that was designed by Daniel Andrieu as a cruiser and first built in 1992.

The design is a development of the 1989 Sun Liberty 34.

== Production ==
The design was built by Jeanneau in France, from 1992 until 1997, but it is now out of production.

== Design ==
The Sun Odyssey 33 is a recreational keelboat, built predominantly of fiberglass, with wood trim. It has a fractional sloop rig. The hull has a raked stem, a reverse transom with steps and a swimming platform, an internally mounted spade-type rudder controlled by a wheel and a fixed fin keel. It displaces 10,362 lb (4,700 kg) and carries 3,444 lb (1,562 kg) of ballast.

The boat has a draft of 6.46 ft (1.97 m) with the standard keel.

The boat is fitted with a diesel engine of 17 hp (13 kW) for docking and maneuvering. The fuel tank holds 17 U.S. gallons (64 L; 14 imp gal) and the fresh water tank has a capacity of 77 U.S. gallons (290 L; 64 imp gal).

The design was built with a two cabin or three cabin interior. The two cabin version has sleeping accommodation for four people, with a double "V"-berth in the bow cabin, a U-shaped settee and a straight settee in the main cabin and an aft cabin with a double berth on the starboard side. The galley is located on the port side just aft of the companionway ladder. The galley is L-shaped and is equipped with a three-burner stove, an ice box and a sink. A navigation station is forward of the galley, on the port side. The head is located opposite the navigation station on the starboard side.

The three cabin version has sleeping accommodation for six people, with a double "V"-berth in the bow cabin, a U-shaped settee in the main cabin and two aft cabins, each with a double berth. The galley is located on the port side, amidships. The straight galley is equipped with a three-burner stove, an ice box and a sink. A navigation station is aft of the galley, on the port side. The head is located opposite the navigation station on the starboard side.

For sailing downwind the design may be equipped with a symmetrical spinnaker.

The design has a hull speed of 6.88 kn (12.74 km/h).

== See also ==
- List of sailing boat types
