= Astrotech =

Astrotech or astrotechnology or variation, may refer to:

== Companies ==
- Astrotech Corporation (formerly SpaceHab), a space technology incubator and space services firm, a partner of NASA
- Astrotech Group, a Chinese aerospace company
- Astro-Technology SOHLA, a Japanese public-private partnership consortium of Osaka Prefecture

== Technology ==
- The technology of astronomy
- Space technology of aerospace
- alien technology from unidentified flying objects

== See also ==
- Technology (disambiguation)
- Tech (disambiguation)
- Astro (disambiguation)
