= Tekh =

Tekh may refer to:

- TeX, a typesetting system
- Tegh, Armenia - also Tekh

== See also ==
- Tech (disambiguation)
- TEK (disambiguation)
