= TEK =

Tek or TEK may refer to:

== Science and technology ==
- Test of Economic Knowledge (TEK), a standardized test of economics
- Traditional ecological knowledge or Traditional Environmental Knowledge (TEK), aboriginal, indigenous, or other forms of traditional knowledges regarding sustainability of local resources
- TEK tyrosine kinase, a protein encoded by the TEK gene
- Session key or traffic encryption key (TEK)
- TEK search engine ("Time Equals Knowledge"), an email-based search engine

== People ==
- Tek (rapper) (real name Tekomin Williams, born 1973), a member of the hip-hop group Smif-N-Wessun
- Jason Varitek, a former baseball catcher for the Boston Red Sox
- Chris O'Ryan, a Grammy Award-winning Australian music producer and sound engineer

== Other ==
- Tektronix, or Tek, an American company
- Terrorelhárítási Központ (TEK, Counter Terrorism Centre), Hungarian counter-terrorism & SWAT state agency
- Tekniikan Akateemiset (TEK), the Finnish Association of Graduate Engineers
- Társadalomelméleti Kollégium, College for Advanced Studies in Social Theory, a college in Hungary
- Tengzhou East railway station, China Railway telegraph code TEK
- Tek, a fictional substance in the TekWar universe

== See also ==
- TEC-9 9mm firearm
- Technician
- Tech (disambiguation)
- Technology
