= Hanson Carroll =

American photographer

- Born: Hanson Thomas Carroll; November 15, 1928; Buffalo, New York
- Died: November 23, 2013 (aged 85); Plantation Key, Florida
- Spouse(s): Louise Loening (m. 1950; div. 1956), Gloria Densmore (m. 1958; d. 1997)
- Website: http://www.jfoto.com/Hanson_Carroll_Photography.htm

Hanson Carroll (November 15, 1928 – November 23, 2013) was a professional photographer noted for his images of wildlife, outdoor sports, and rural New England life. His work appeared in publications such as Vermont Life, Ski, Life, and Sports Illustrated, and he authored several photo‑illustrated articles on farm life, hunting, fishing, and sailing. Himself an avid outdoorsman, he was an ardent participant in the activities he photographed and wrote about.

== Early life and training ==
Carroll was born in Buffalo, New York, on November 15, 1928. While attending the Westminster prep school in Simsbury, Connecticut, he spent a summer as a crew member aboard the Atlantis, a ketch-rigged research ship operated by the Woods Hole Oceanographic Institution. In 1947, he served as an ordinary seaman on a ship that departed in New York City and some months later arrived in Portland, Oregon. He later attended Marlboro College in Vermont. At the end of World War II, he enlisted in the Army and served as an infantryman until his discharge in 1951. In 1950, while still in uniform, Carroll married socialite Louise Loening. That year, the couple bought a farm in Norwich, Vermont, where he lived for most of the rest of his life. After his military discharge, Carroll began work as a reporter for the Valley News of White River Junction in that state.

== Career in photography ==
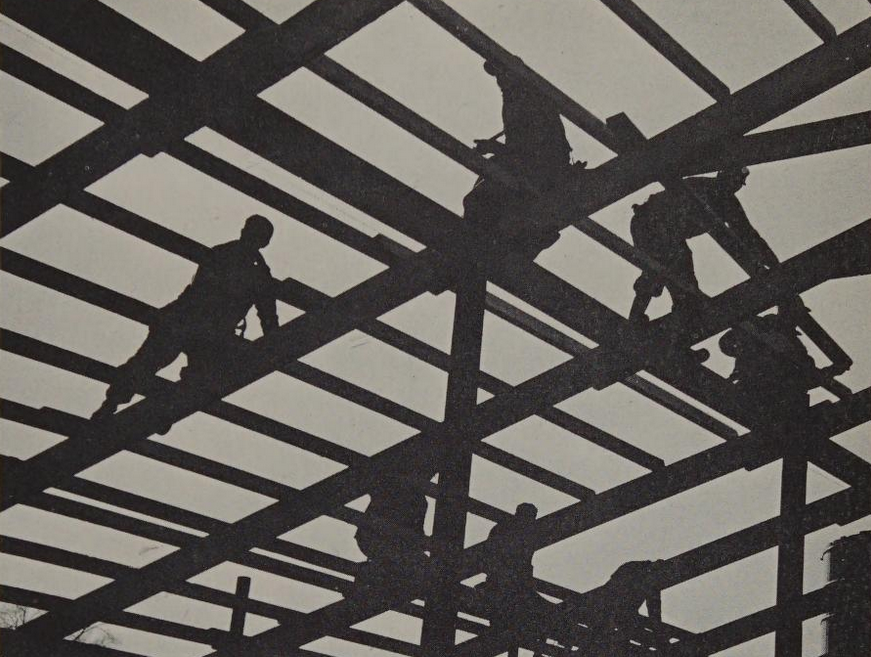
Hanson Carroll, 1956, Vermonters Build Barn Framing, A Treasury of Vermont Life (1956, Countryman Press)

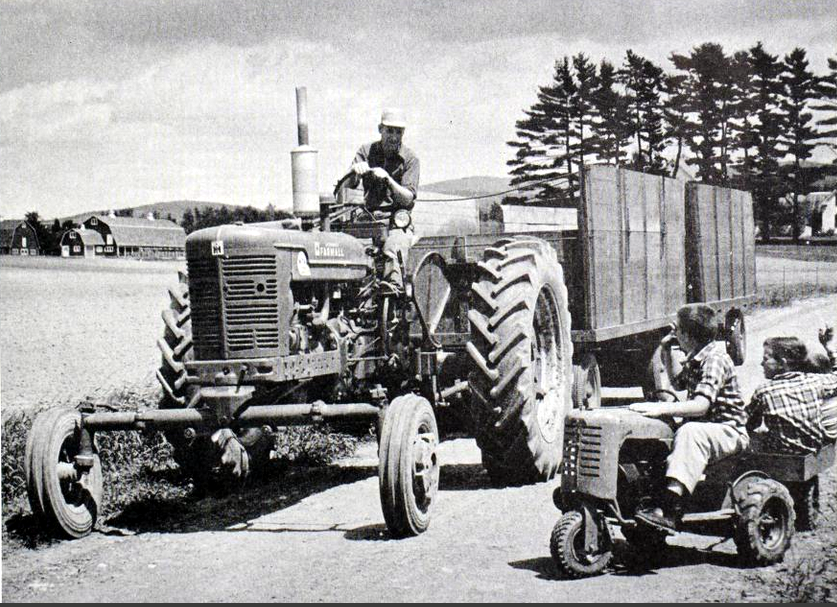
Hanson Carroll, 1958, Starlake Farm, Vermont Life

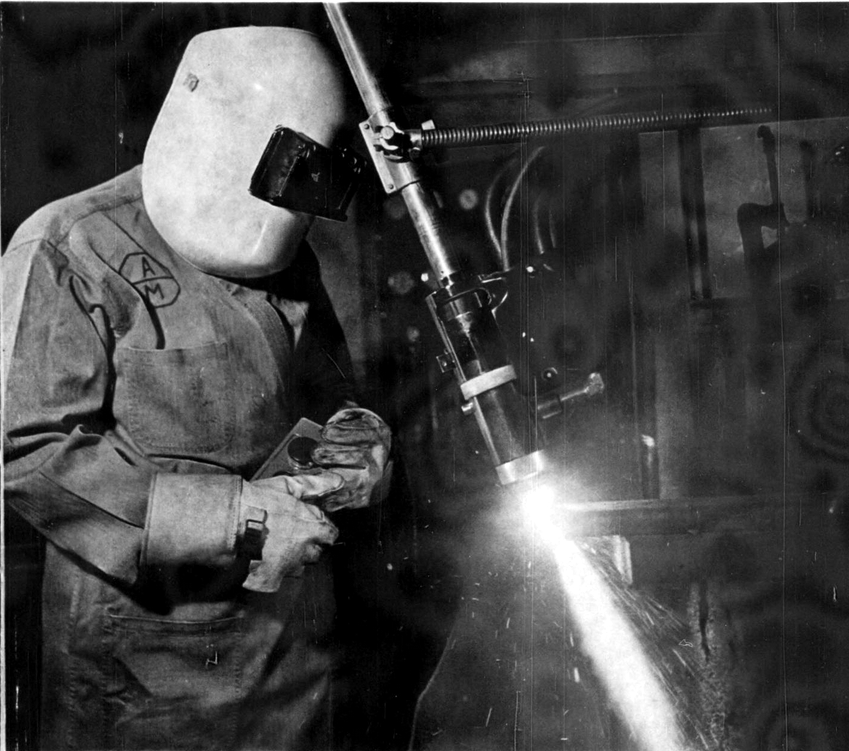
Hanson Carroll, 1960, Special Machining, Iron Age

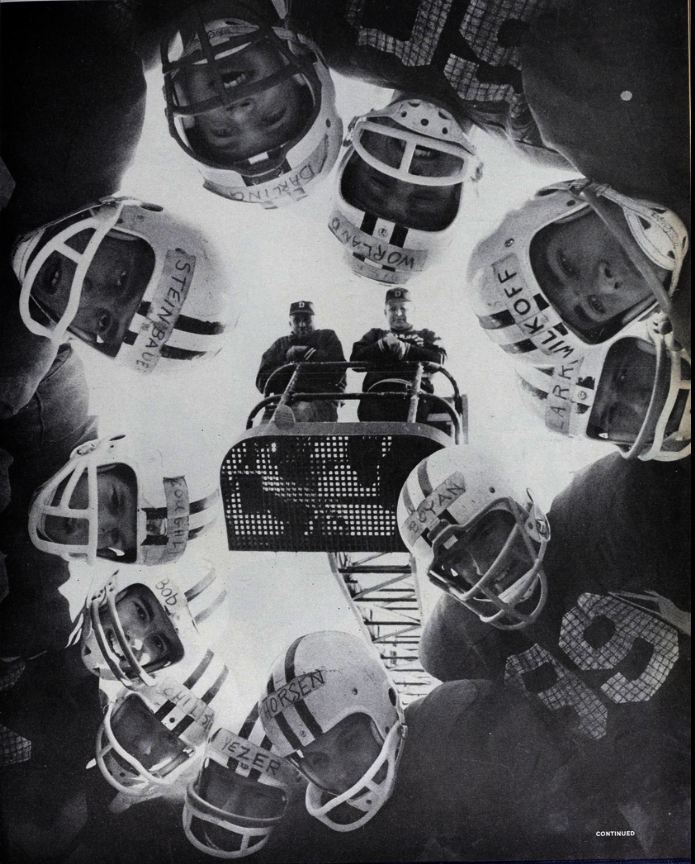
Hanson Carroll, 1962, Sports: High Eye on a Huddle, Life

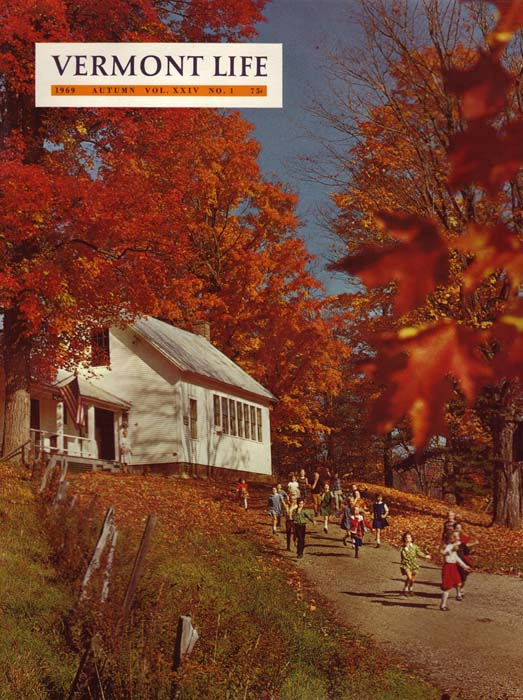
Hanson Carroll, 1969, Hewittville School, Pomfret, Vermont Life

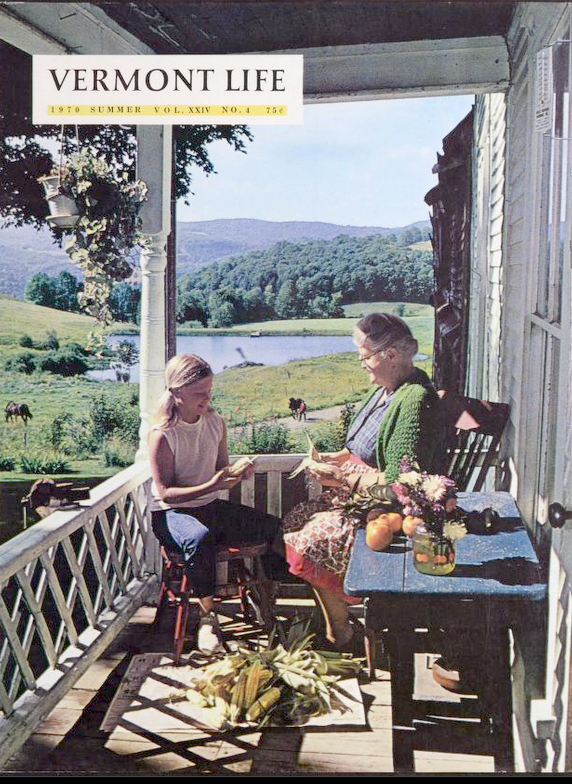
Hanson Carroll, 1970, Harold Harrington Farm, North Pomfret, Vermont Life

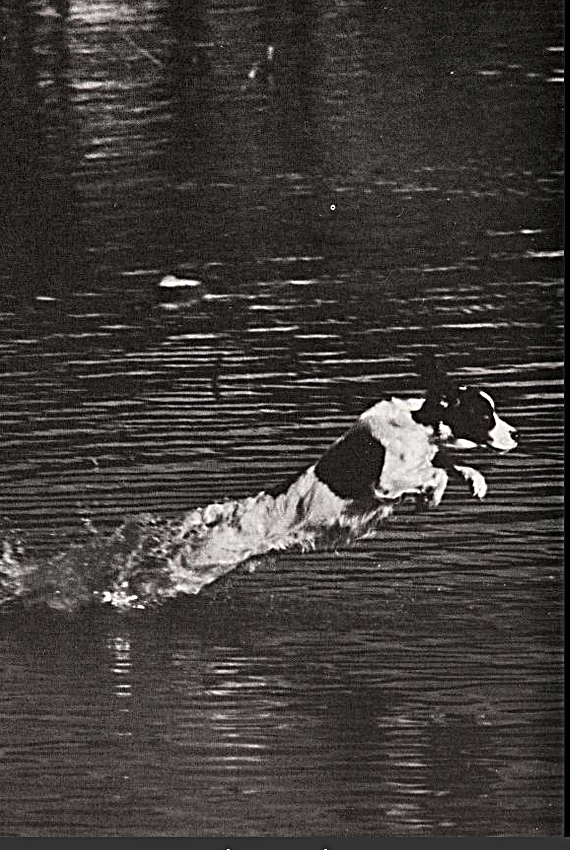
Hanson Carroll, 1972, Flushing Spaniel, Dog Training (Sports Illustrated, New York, Harper & Row)

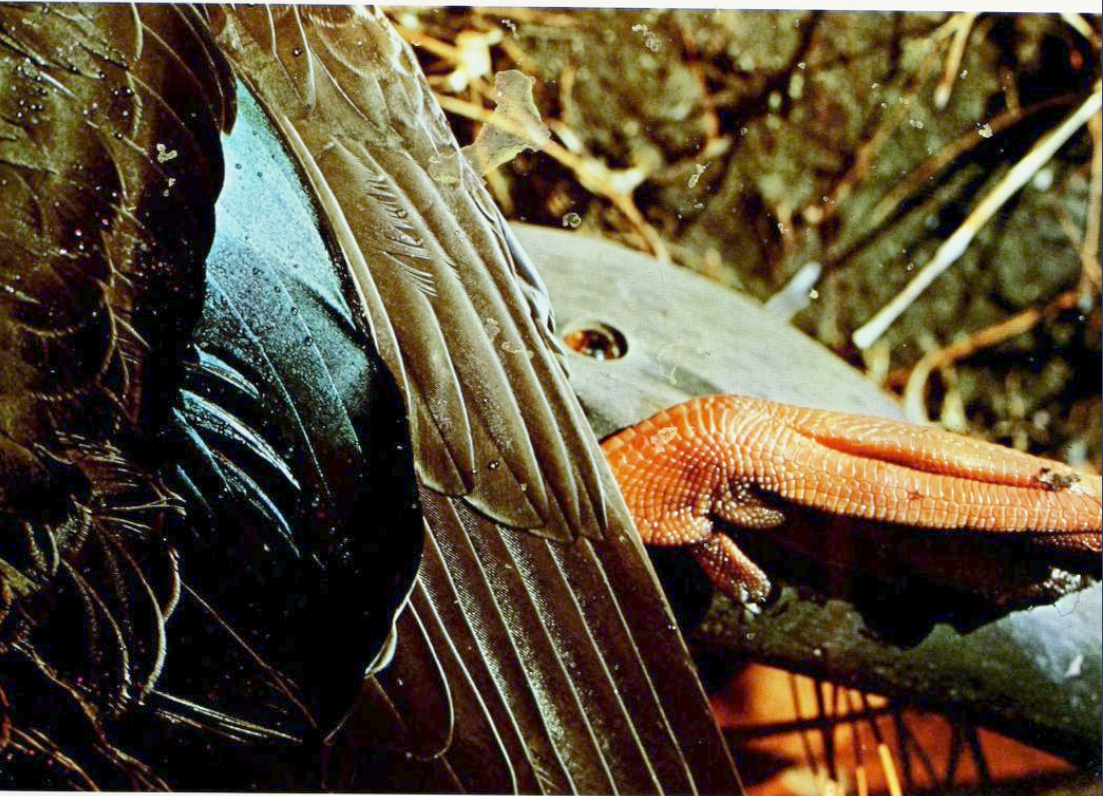
Hanson Carroll, 1973, No Decoy Could Ever Match the Exquisite Texture and Iridescent Markings of the Real Bird, Waterfowler's World (New York, Winchester Press)

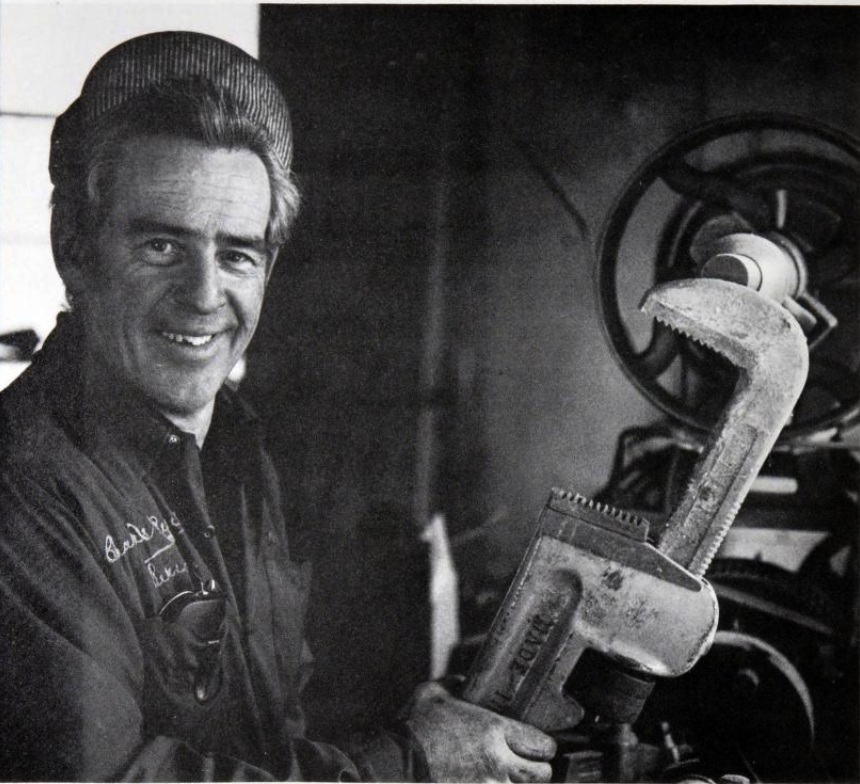
Hanson Carroll, 1975, The Philosophy of Armstrong, Vermont Life

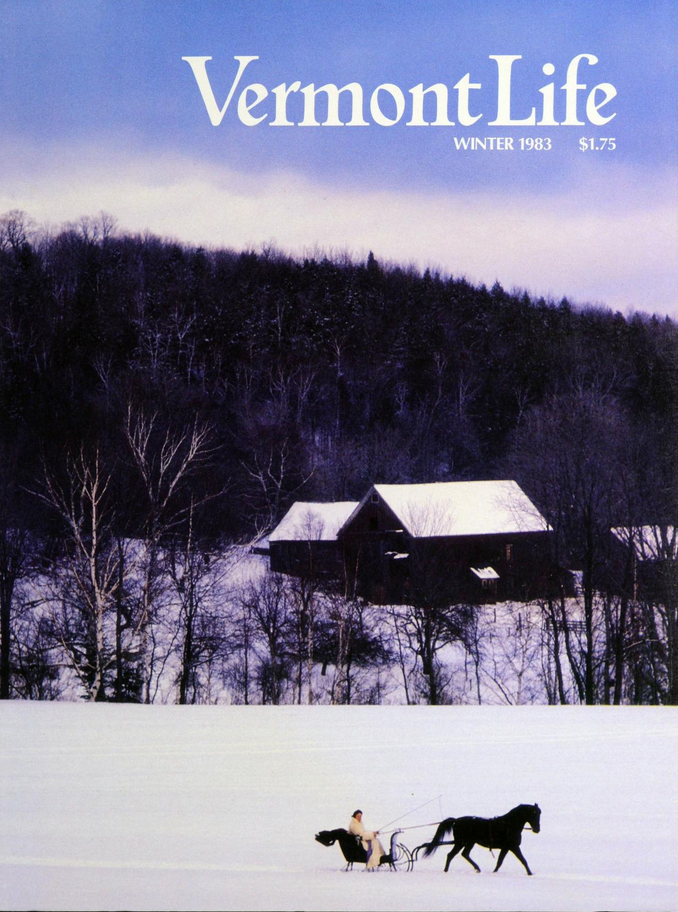
Hanson Carroll, 1983, Dina Albright Glides Over a Stark and Quiet Countryside in South Woodstock, Vermont Life

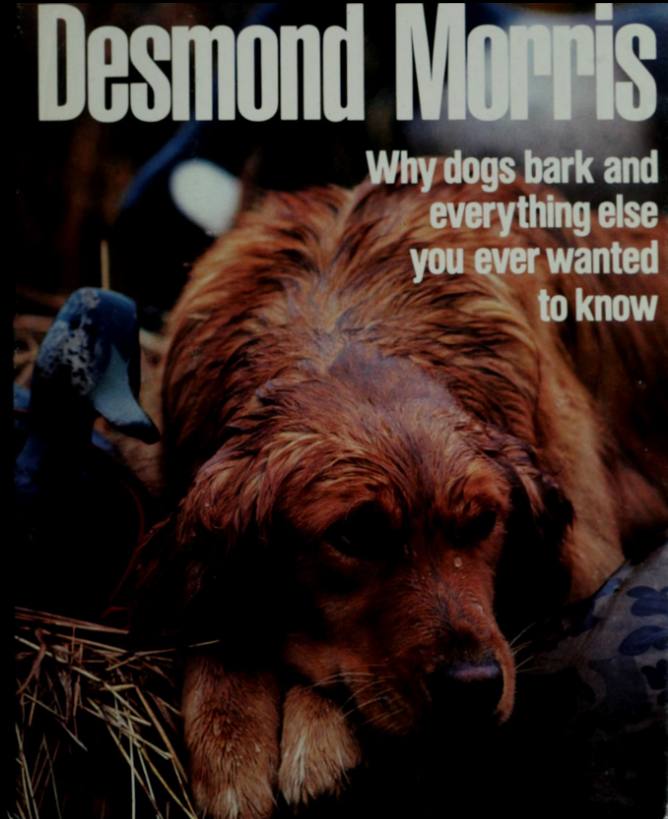
Hanson Carroll, 1987, Dogwatching [book cover] (New York, Crown)

=== Early freelance work ===
While on the staff of Valley News, Carroll sometimes took news photographs. By the mid-1950s, he had begun work as a specialist photographer for both that paper and the UPI wire. He soon branched out into freelance work and in 1955 completed some of his first commissions, including a syndicated photo feature about a woman collegiate sports car racer that appeared in newspapers' Sunday supplements and a New York Times photo spread about a Korean refugee family in Hanover, New Hampshire. That year, he also began a three-year association with the King Features Syndicate, beginning with a photo feature on a student logrolling event at a New Hampshire prep school. The following year and thereafter, he prepared photo spreads for the syndicate on an Olympic skier from his hometown (1956), a pair of Americans who made a low-budget ski holiday in Europe (1956), the operators of a weather station in the harsh winter climate of New Hampshire's Mount Washington (1956), and a motorcycle race in Franconia, New Hampshire (1958).

=== Ski magazine ===
In 1955 he also began a freelance association with Ski magazine. That year, he contributed photos to an article on the same Olympic skier he would later photograph for King Features. In 1957, Ski showed one of his photos on its front cover. Thereafter, his photos appeared regularly in the magazine until the early 1960s, including issues published every year between 1956 and 1961. (Note: Carroll published photos in Ski in 1956, 1957, 1958, 1959, 1960, and 1961.)

=== Vermont Life ===
In 1956 he began a long relationship with Vermont Life magazine. Between 1956 and 1999, he contributed freelance photos to practically every issue. (Note: A search in the Internet Archive conducted on November 23, 2025, revealed more than 150 instances in which Carroll's photos appeared in Vermont Life between 1956 and 1999.) Some examples include a 1956 article on peat harvesting in Woodstock, Vermont, a 1964 feature article on Burlington, Vermont, a 1965 cover photo, an article that year on a beagle hunting dog, a 1970 article on bicycle touring in Vermont, and a 1975 article on a Norwich, Vermont, car mechanic.

=== Other freelance work ===
During the mid- to late 1950s Carroll's photos appeared in two Life magazine photo spreads (1956), a book on life in Vermont (1956), a New York Times piece on the construction of a church by residents of rural Claremont, New Hampshire (1957), a photobook about Woodstock, Vermont (1957) and a Life article about a New Hampshire dog who ate fire (1959). In the 1960s, his work appeared in the Saturday Evening Post (1960), Sports Illustrated (1960), Iron Age (1960) American Sportsman (1968), and again in Life (1962).

=== Freelance work and personal recreation ===
From the late 1960s through the end of his career, Carroll frequently took photos of the outdoor sports in which he himself engaged. In 1968, he took photos for an article in American Sportsman magazine on snowshoeing as a sport. In 1970, he helped illustrate an American Sportsman special issue on the classic hunting dog. During the next five years, his photos appeared in other major outdoor sports magazines, including Field & Stream, Outdoor Life, and Sports Afield. In 1972, he provided photos for a Sports Illustrated book on the training of hunting dogs. By 1983, the mass-market periodicals National Geographic and Look could be added to this list. In 1973, his photos illustrated a book on wetland wildfowl hunting, and, a year later, he contributed photos to a book on fly casting.

=== Late career ===
During the 1970s and 1980s Carroll's work was profiled in articles that appeared in the New York Times, Philadelphia Inquirer, and other newspapers. In the mid-1970s, Carroll bought a trailerable cruising sailboat and began sailing in Atlantic coast waters as far north as Nova Scotia and as far south as the Bahamas. In the mid-1990s, he moved to the Florida Keys and there spent much of his time taking saltwater fishing photos. In 1996, the New York Times included Carroll in a feature on a century's worth of photos in its magazine. He died in 2013 while living in the Keys.

=== Style and methods ===
Carroll took most of his photos outdoors. Many of them recorded subjects with which he was most familiar. He used a variety of small cameras. He shot mostly in natural light, using both color and black and white films. He frequently posed his human subjects. His photos were often cropped from the original for publication. In 2006, the editors of Vermont Life described the work that went into making the highly-regarded cover photo for the Summer issue of 1970. They explained that Carroll and the magazine's art director carefully arranged the scene. Although staged, they said, the photo—showing a young girl and older woman shucking corn on a porch overlooking a bucolic farm scene—depicted a situation that was not uncommon in rural Vermont at that time. In a book on rural Vermont, author Cameron Clifford called the photo probably the magazine's "most iconic".

After Carroll's death a reporter wrote, "He was a participant, not just an observer", adding that he "loved to fly and sport fish, hunt, ski, snowshoe, sail, canoe, kayak, and ride and race enduro, or off-road, motorcycles and sports cars." He would sometimes send proposals to magazine publishers for articles and photo spreads that he thought would interest them. He also took photos without any immediate purpose but simply in hope that a media organization could someday use them.

He advised amateur photographers to add a touch of red to color photos, fill the frame with the main subject of the photo, avoid shooting when the sun is overhead, and vary the camera position—sometimes low, sometimes high.

He also suggested low light rather than bright, particularly for color work. He said photographers should look for unusual points of view; he said, "Lots of people stand at the shore and take pictures aimed toward the water. Go into the water and shoot toward land." (Note: His other tips included: When taking pictures of dogs or cats, focus on their noses, not their eyes.; Put a polarizing filter on your lens; it enriches color.; Lenses are most sharp at an aperture setting of f/5.6.; To blur snowfall, set your camera at a shutter speed of 1/30 of a second and your lens opening at f/4 or f/2.8.; For greater depth of field, focus one-third of the way into the shot.; When photographing people, it's very effective if you have them touching an arm around the shoulder or holding hands.; To create strong pictures, be aware of every part of the frame before you snap your shutter. The corners are just as important as the middle.; Focus up rather than down at the subject. It allows you to capture the sparkle in someone's eyes.)

In the mid-1970s, Carroll's work received praise from journalists, one saying some of his photos were magnificent and another praising a particularly difficult shot. (Note: In 1974, a reporter praised the photos Carroll published in Wildflowler's World, writing, "The photographs in this book are, in a word, magnificent". That year, another reporter credited Carroll with achieving a particularly difficult hunting photo, writing, "Perhaps the most difficult photograph to make successfully is one of a dead duck. Carroll does it perfectly in a tightly cropped shot of blue and brown wing feathers over a brightly scaled foot beside a decoy.")

== Author ==
In 1958 Carroll wrote and photo-illustrated a Vermont Life article on a well-equipped new cattle and dairy farm in Norwich, Vermont. In the same issue, he co-authored and photo-illustrated an article on a small manufacturer of medical equipment operating out of a rural barn in Woodstock, Vermont. That year, he also wrote and photo-illustrated an article on farm electrification for a journal called Electricity on the Farm. In 1965, Carroll wrote and photo-illustrated a Vermont Life article called "You Don't Take Her Hunting, She Takes You" about a dog used for winter rabbit hunting . His writings and photographs also appeared together in magazine articles published in the late 1960s and early 1970s, including a 1968 article on snowshoeing for American Sportsman, a 1970 article on biking in Vermont for Vermont Life, and two 1971 articles on other subjects for that magazine.

During the 1970s he wrote three New York Times articles about trailering the sailboat he owned, and one about kayaking. He also wrote a Vermont Life article on a blacksmith, and an article in Rudder magazine on trailerable boats in Texas.

In 1978 Carroll told an interviewer that writing for publication made a photographer more versatile. He said the advantage was not that he got paid for his articles but that the work enabled him to "operate in so many more fields". He said that when conducting an interview, he took photos first and asked his questions later, saving the "tough questions" for the end.

== Teacher ==
In the mid-1980s Carroll gave small-group photography sessions at the Killington Ski Resort. A participant said the classes, "included 14 hours of instruction that broke down somewhat as follows: a discussion of cameras, lenses, film, equipment, lighting, and so-called tricks of the trade." He said, "Processing color and black-and-white film without a dark room was also demonstrated."

== Personal life and family ==
Carroll's father, Marshall Carroll, was a salesman for steel manufacturing companies. His mother, Josephine Wright Carroll, was a homemaker. He had an older brother, Marshall Carroll, Jr. In the late 1930s, the family moved from Buffalo to Hartland, Vermont.

Carroll and his wife Louise had one child, a daughter named Mia. In 1956, the couple divorced. Two years later, he married Gloria Densmore, a radiologist who shared his love of sports car rallies and MG T-type cars. They had two sons, Jay H. Carroll and Chris R. Carroll.

On his Norwich farm Carroll had a kennel where he boarded and trained dogs for use on both woodland and waterfowl hunts.

In about 1973 Carroll bought a Paceship 23 trailerable sloop from a boatyard in Nova Scotia. He and his family used the craft to sail the New England and Mid-Atlantic coasts in the warm months and, via trailering, to sail off Florida and in the Caribbean in the colder ones. He wrote, "We soon got proficient at setting the rigging quickly and were able to go from the highway to a boat under full sail, with the coffee on, in fifteen minutes. The boat, called "Infinity"," slept four in tiny quarters. It had a stub keel and transom-hung rudder. Its set of sails included mainsail and jib, genoa and spinnaker. It used a small outboard motor for maneuvering near shore.

Carroll lost most of his photo archive in a 1981 fire that severely damaged the farmhouse in Norwich, but he was able to replenish the archive and rebuild the structure.

In 1974 a book reviewer called it "incongruous" that Carroll was "one of the most successful outdoor photographers in the land", since he was a person "whose middle-aged cameras, like his canoes, motorcycles, guns and rods are more toys to him than tools of his profession." A year later, an interviewer described Carroll as, "probably the most featured photographer in Vermont Life's 30-year history", saying that "when he occasionally sits down in front of a typewriter, the results aren't bad at all, but he'd much rather sit down in a kayak and shoot down some rushing white water or get out in the woods to hunt."

After a few years of wintering in Florida, Carroll moved there permanently. Following the death of his wife Gloria in 1997, he settled on Plantation Key, an island in the upper Keys, south of Key Largo.

During the last decades of his life, he continued to photograph outdoor sports, particularly saltwater fishing. He also continued to be an active participant in outdoor activities, including bicycle riding and trailering his skiff to favored fishing spots. Having long been a problem drinker, he gave up alcohol when he turned 80 and remained sober until his death. He suffered from dementia during his last years and died peacefully at home on November 23, 2013.
