= Technics =

Technic or Technics may refer to:

- Technics (brand), a brand name of the Panasonic Corporation
- Technics (law), a legal concept
- Technician
- Lego Technic, an advanced line of Lego products

== See also ==
- Techne, an Ancient Greek philosophical concept
- Technique (disambiguation)
- Technical (disambiguation)
- Technology
