= Paceship PY 23 =

1970s Canadian trailer sailer

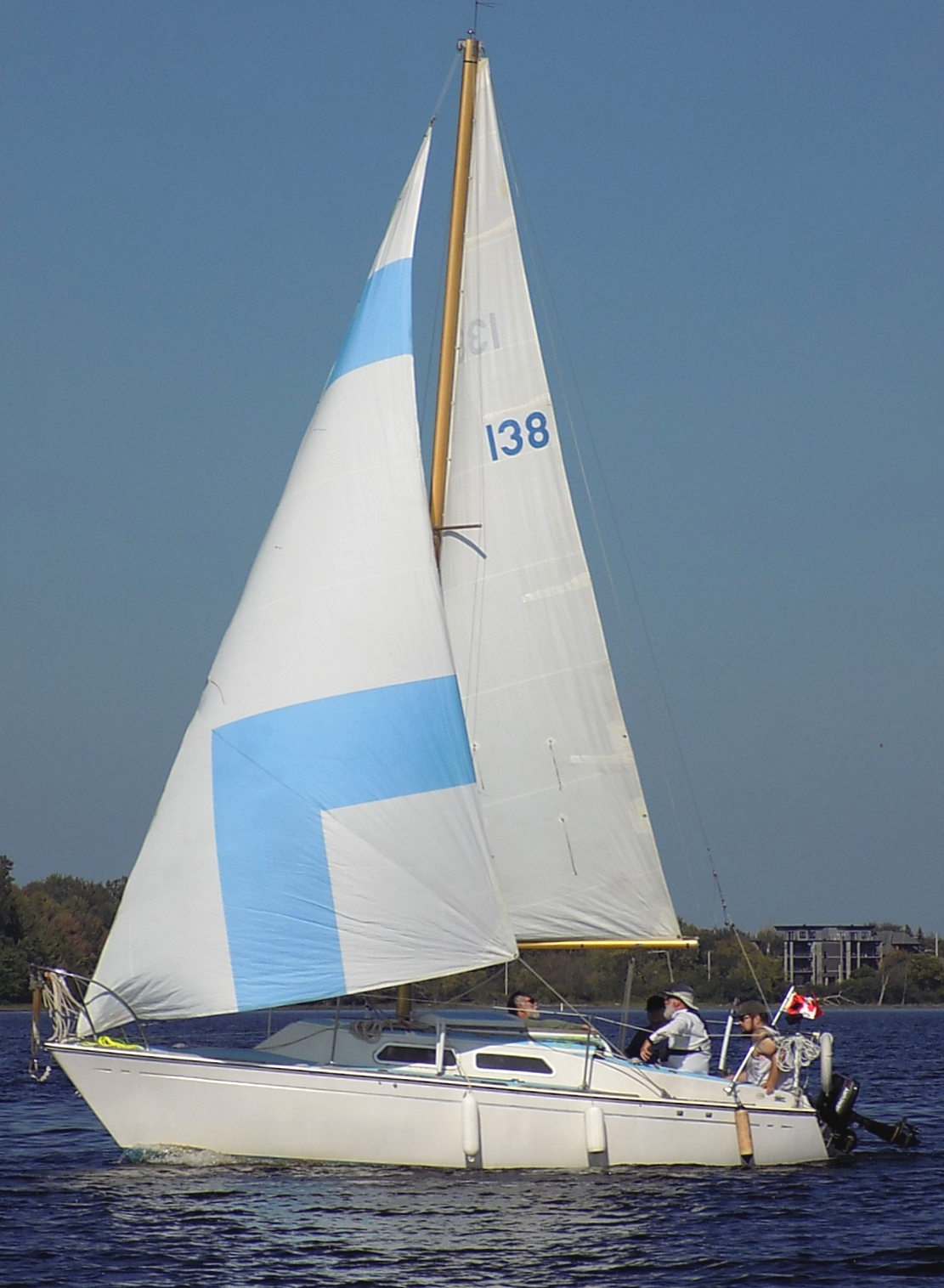

Development
- Designer: John Deknatel of C. Raymond Hunt Associates
- Location: Canada
- Year: 1973
- Builders: Paceship Yachts and American Machine and Foundry (AMF)

Boat
- Displacement: 2,460 lb (1,116 kg)
- Draft: 4.75 ft (1.45 m) centreboard down

Hull
- Type: Monohull
- Construction: Fibreglass
- LOA: 22.58 ft (6.88 m)
- LWL: 19.75 ft (6.02 m)
- Beam: 8.00 ft (2.44 m)
- Engine: Outboard motor

Hull appendages
- Keel: fin keel or centreboard
- Ballast: 945 lb (429 kg)
- Rudder: transom-mounted rudder

Rig
- General: Masthead sloop
- I foretriangle height: 28.00 ft (8.53 m)
- J foretriangle base: 9.50 ft (2.90 m)
- P mainsail luff: 24.00 ft (7.32 m)
- E mainsail foot: 7.70 ft (2.35 m)

Sails
- Mainsail area: 92.40 sq ft (8.584 m^{2})
- Jib/genoa area: 133.00 sq ft (12.356 m^{2})
- Total sail area: 225.40 sq ft (20.940 m^{2})

Racing
- Class association: MORC
- PHRF: 240

The Paceship PY 23 (or PY23) is a masthead sloop rigged trailer sailer built from 1973 by Paceship Yachts in Mahone Bay, Nova Scotia. In 1975 Paceship Yachts was acquired by American Machine and Foundry and production moved to Connecticut until 1981.

== Design ==
Designed by John Deknatel of C. Raymond Hunt Associates,

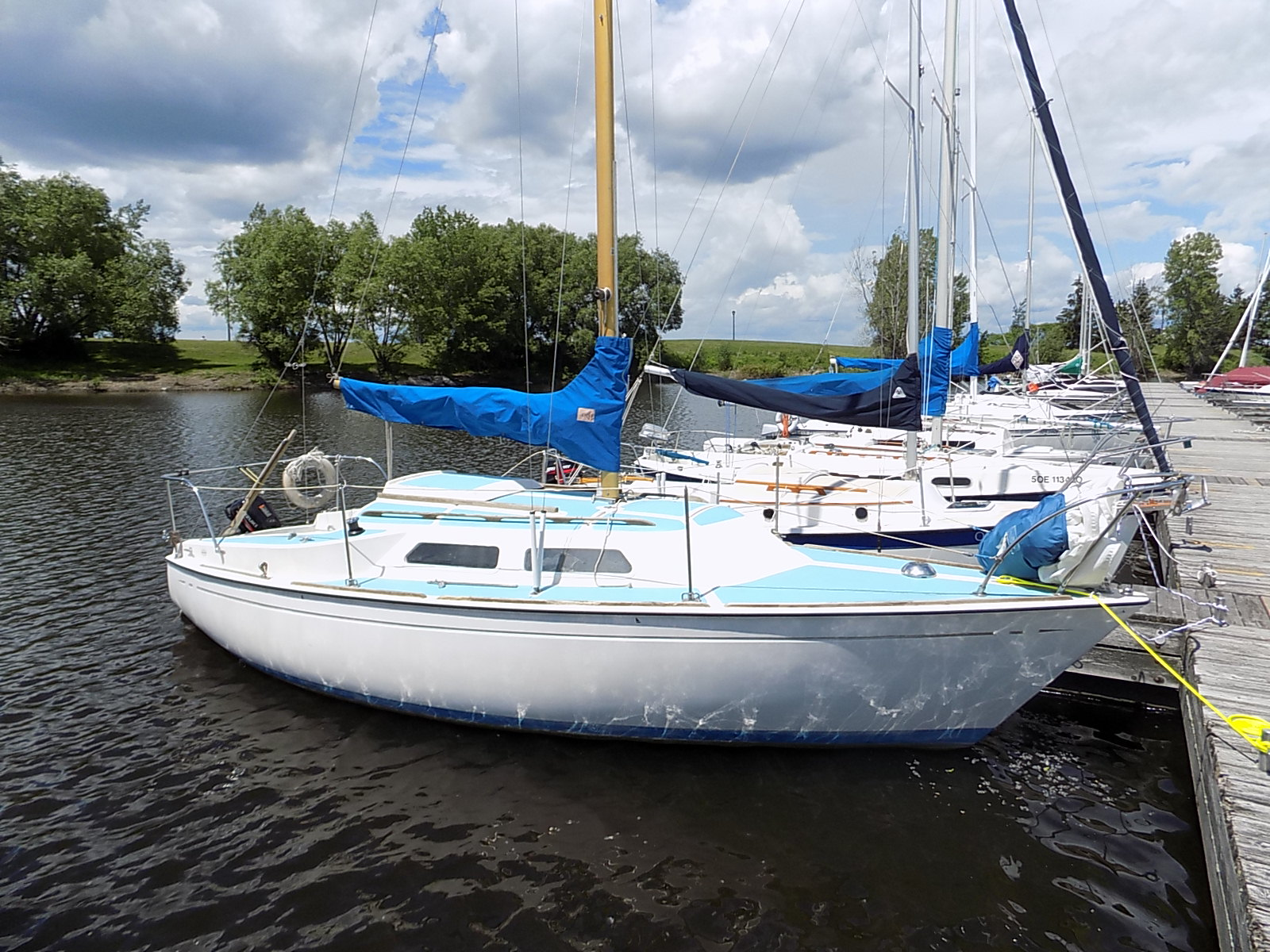
Paceship PY 23

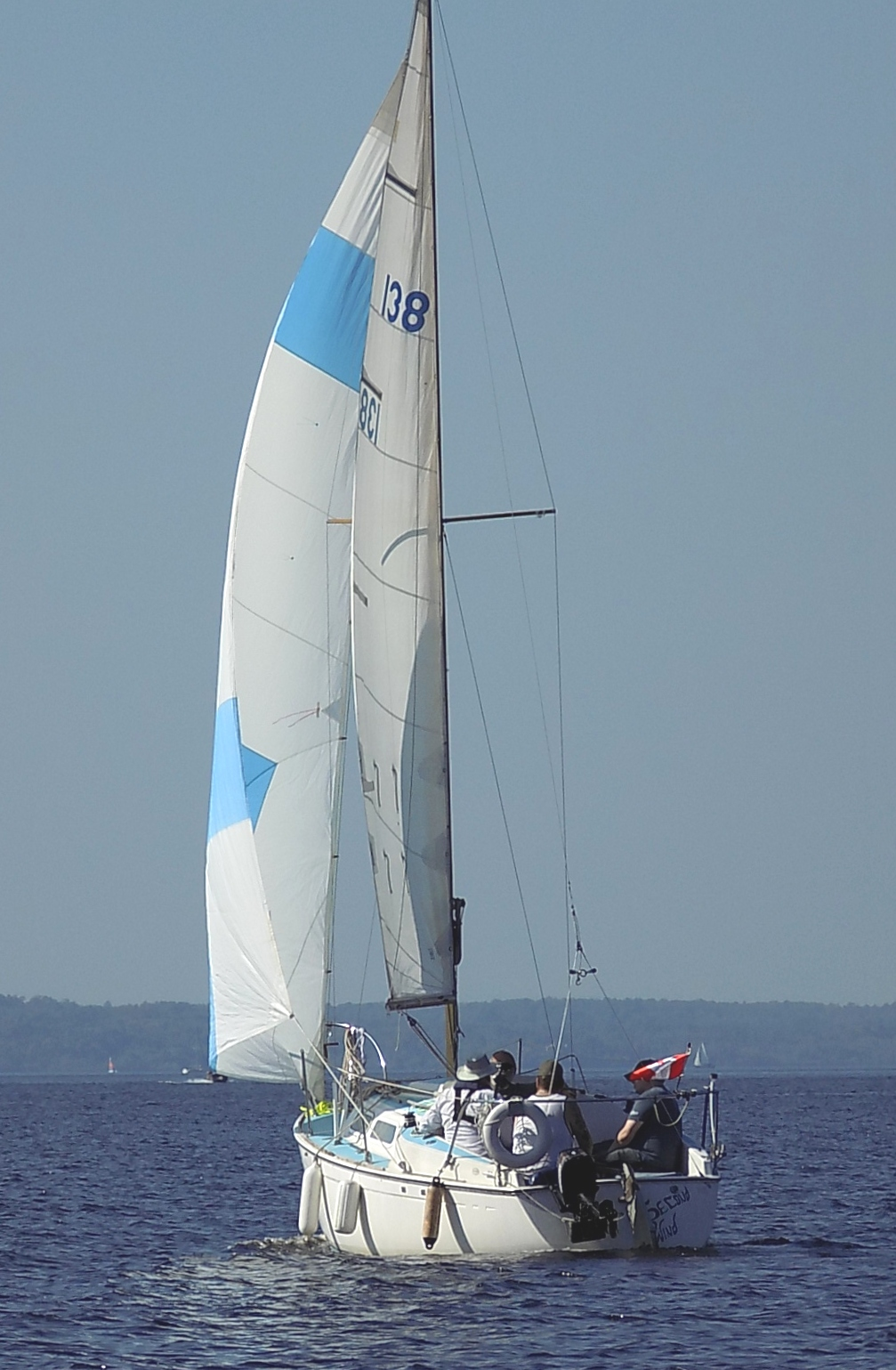
Paceship PY 23

the hull is hand-laid up fibreglass with balsa cores and teak and mahogany wood trim. It a transom-hung rudder, a centreboard and or an optional fixed fin keel. It displaces 2,460 lb (1,116 kg) and carries 945 lb (429 kg) of iron and lead ballast.

The centreboard version has a draft of 4.75 ft (1.45 m) with the 45 lb (20 kg) lead-weighted centreboard and kick-up rudder both extended and 1.75 ft (0.53 m) with the centreboard retracted into the 900 lb (408 kg) stub iron keel, allowing ground transportation on a trailer. The stub iron keel on the centreboard version allows the centreboard to be retracted without using interior cabin accommodation space, as well as beaching without damage to the hull.

The later fixed fin keel version has a draft of 3.75 ft (1.14 m) and is often referred to as the PY 23K or PY 23 FK. This fixed keel version was designed for Midget Ocean Racing Club (MORC) competition.

The design features anodized spars, a self-bailing cockpit designed for six adults and an optional mainsheet traveller. A cockpit dodger was also optional. Below deck accommodations include four cabin windows, 5 ft (150 cm) headroom, a "V" berth in the bow, storage shelving and bins, a folding dining table, an optional gallery with an icebox, a stainless steel sink and a 12 U.S. gallons (45 L; 10.0 imp gal) fresh water tank.

The PY 23 was designed so that even if a knock-down occurs that puts the mast in the water, the boat's interior will not take on water and the boat remains self-righting.

The boat is normally fitted with a small 3 to 6 hp (2 to 4 kW) outboard motor for docking and maneuvering.

The design has a PHRF racing average handicap of 240 and a hull speed of 5.96 kn (11.04 km/h).

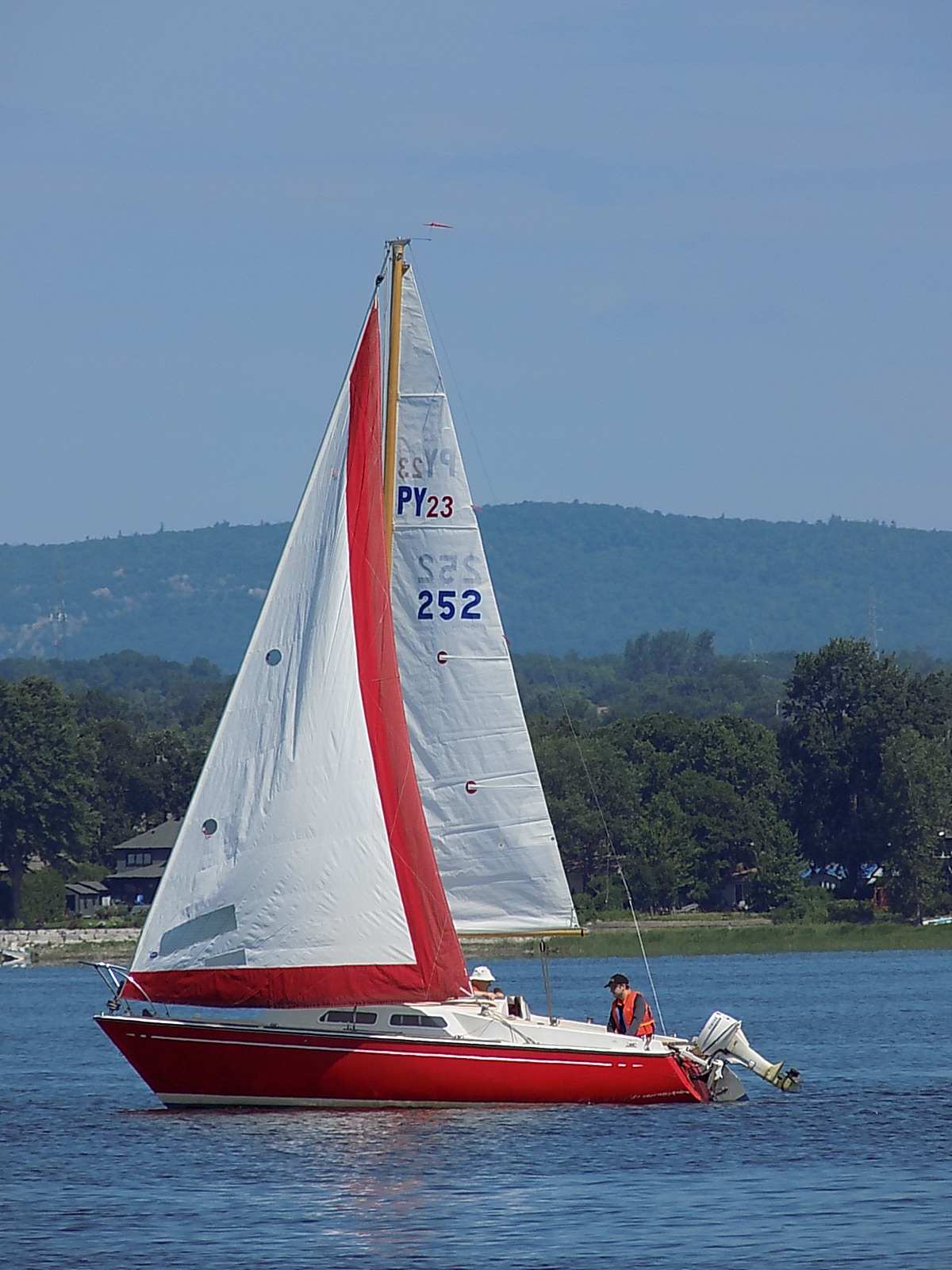
Paceship PY 23

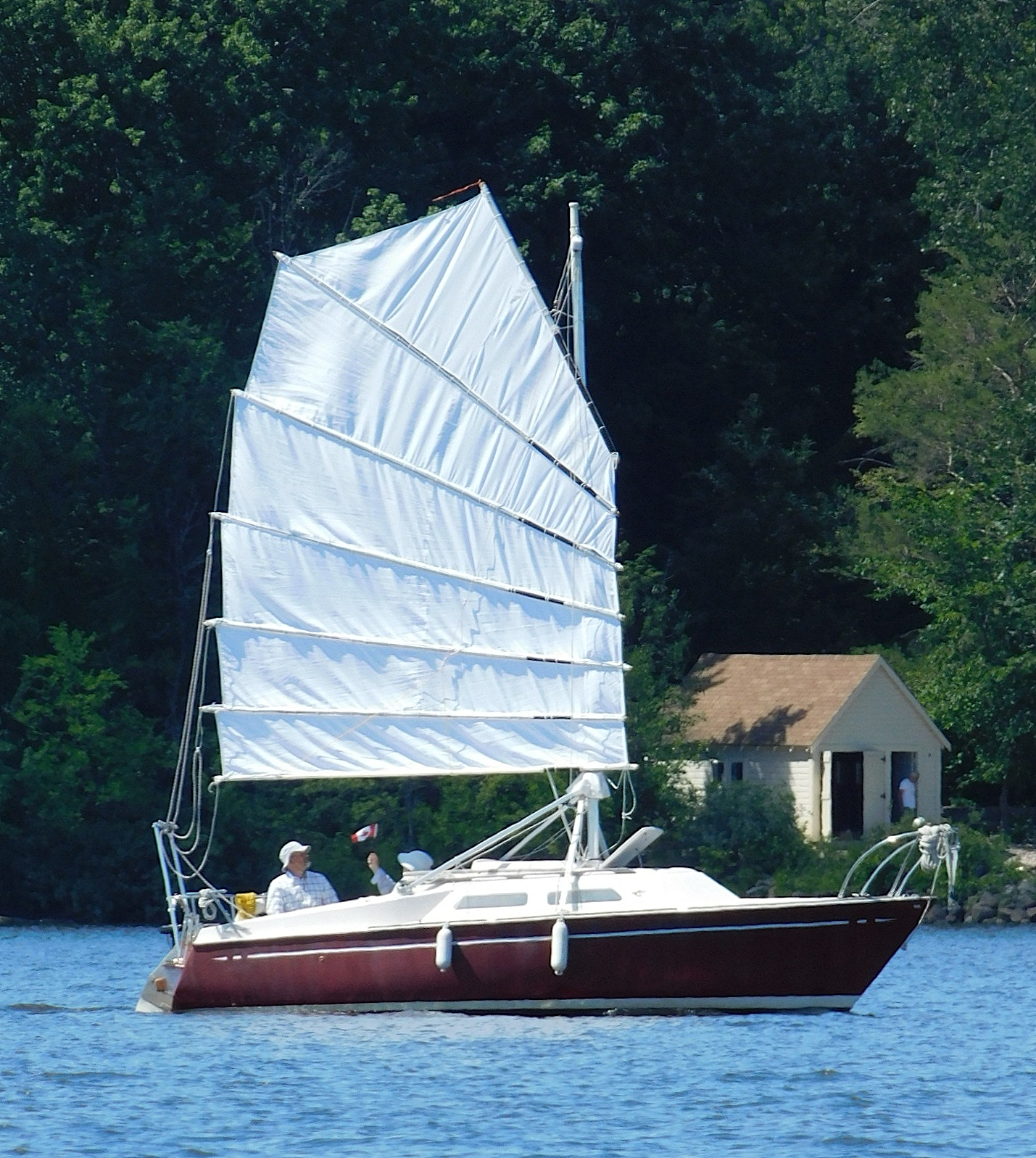
Paceship PY 23 modified with a junk rig

In a review Michael McGoldrick wrote, "Unlike the interior of many boats built in the 1970s which have a dinette arrangement, the PY23's layout features two settees which are parallel to the centerline, and a table which folds up against a bulkhead. This layout often provides for more open space in the main cabin. It's also in this size range that boats get big enough to have a semi-private head located behind a bulkhead."

In a 2010 review Steve Henkel wrote, "it is interesting to compare this vessel with the slightly smaller O'Day 22 ... designed by the same firm, Raymond Hunt Associates, at around the same time. The PY23, like her little sister, has a reverse transom, which adds a foot to the hull length, justifying the '23' designation, at least in the minds of her marketers. Both boats were offered with either keel or shoal-draft keel-centerboard configuration. The layouts below are also similar, except for the galley location; the bigger boat puts the galley under the main hatch, where the cook, if he wants, can stand up straight to make dinner. Best features: The coamings are unusually high forward, giving good back support to the PY23's crew. The helmsperson, however has to suffer with a coaming no higher than the O’Day 22's. Down below, a sliding door affords privacy in the head compartment, and the head is well positioned under the forward hatch to give good ventilation and good headroom and knee room. Worst features: While the PY23's cabin space is certainly greater than the Kirby Blazer ... it's a great deal less than the Precision 23's (which is almost a foot longer and half a foot wider)."
