= Chance 32/28 =

Sailboat class

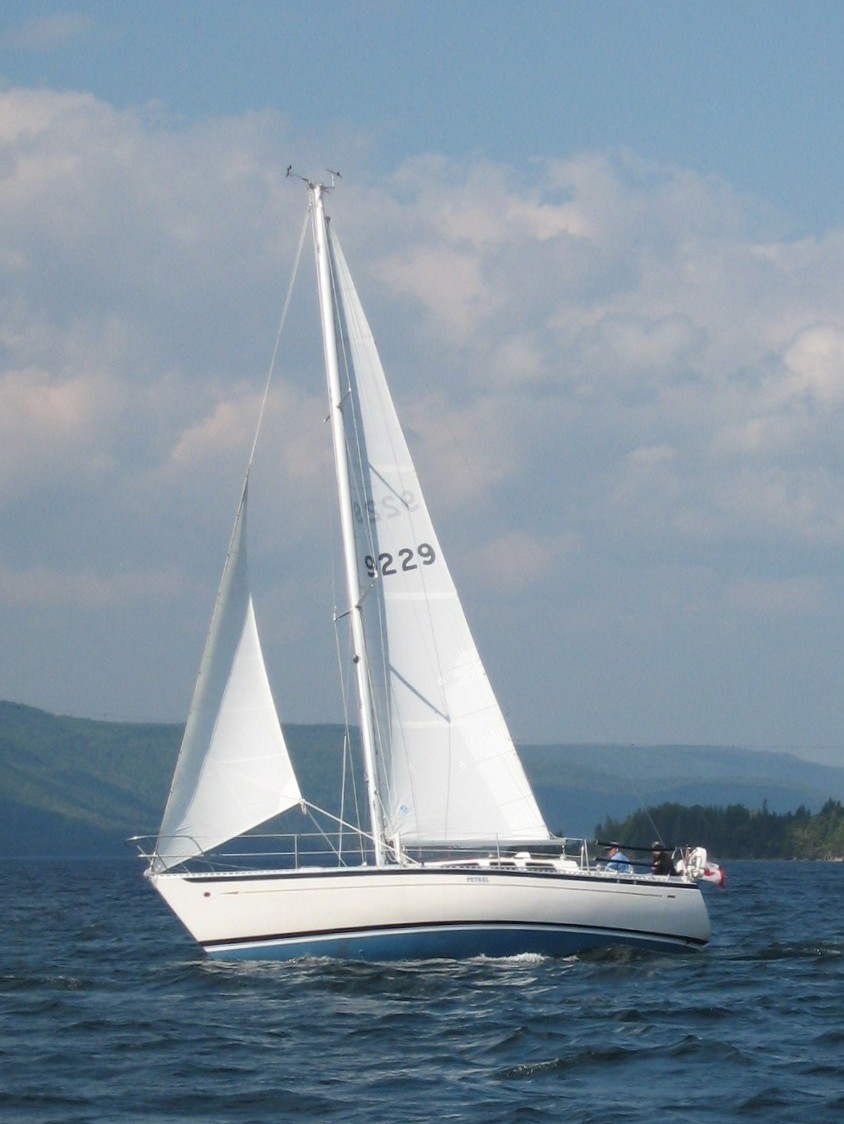

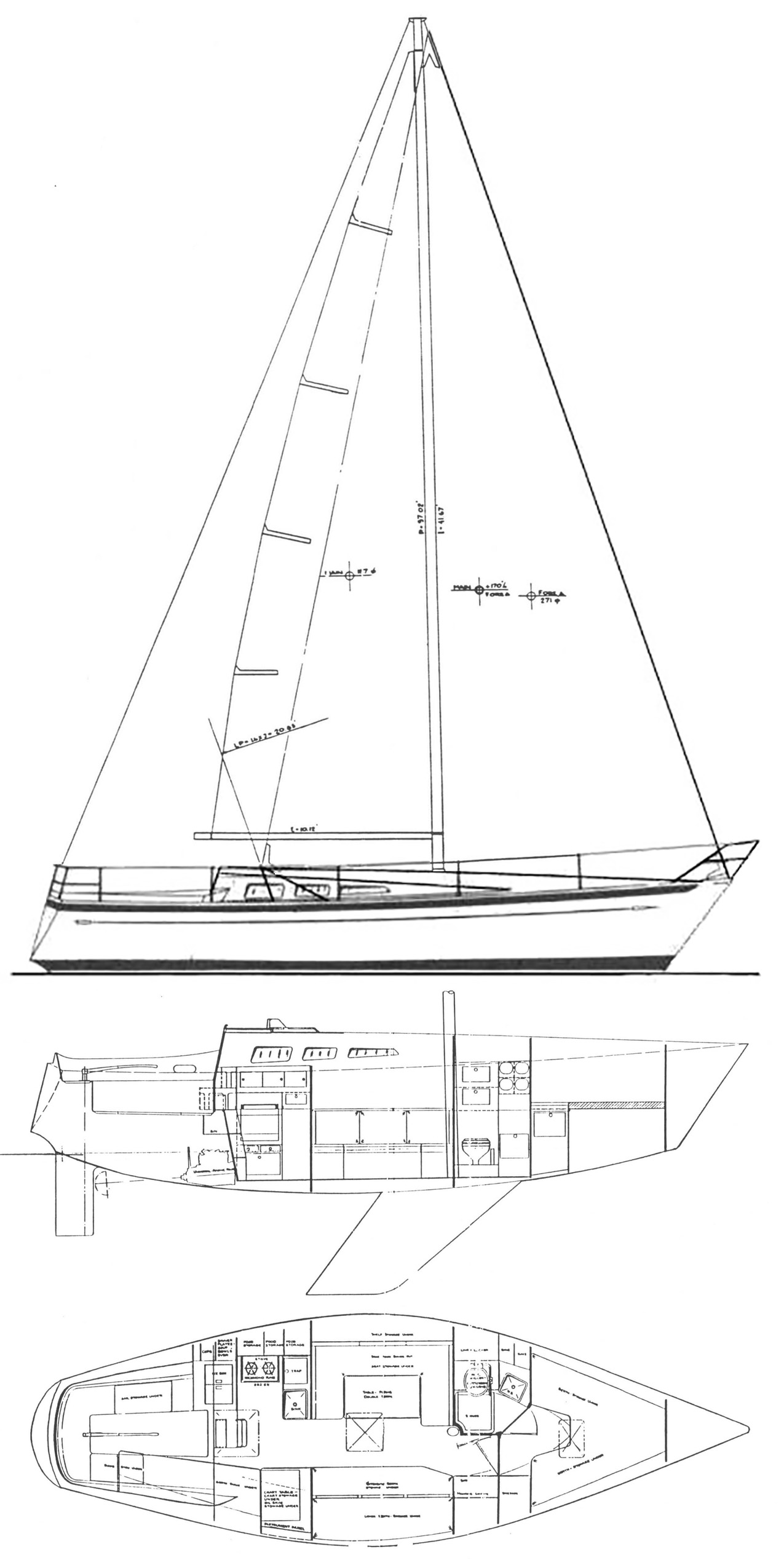

Development
- Designer: Britton Chance Jr.
- Location: Canada
- Year: 1972
- No. built: 41 (Canada), 20 (France)
- Builders: Paceship Yachts and Chantier Henri Wanquiez, France
- Role: IOR 3/4 ton
- Name: Chance 32/28

Boat
- Displacement: 12,025 lb (5,454 kg)
- Draft: 5.75 ft (1.75 m)

Hull
- Type: Monohull
- Construction: Fiberglass
- LOA: 32.08 ft (9.78 m)
- LWL: 27.75 ft (8.46 m)
- Beam: 10.00 ft (3.05 m)
- Engine: Universal Atomic 4

Hull appendages
- Keel: fin keel
- Ballast: 4,680 lb (2,123 kg)
- Rudder: rudder on skeg

Rig
- General: Masthead sloop
- I foretriangle height: 41.70 ft (12.71 m)
- J foretriangle base: 13.00 ft (3.96 m)
- P mainsail luff: 37.00 ft (11.28 m)
- E mainsail foot: 11.10 ft (3.38 m)

Sails
- Mainsail area: 187.32 sq ft (17.403 m^{2})
- Jib/genoa area: 271.27 sq ft (25.202 m^{2})
- Total sail area: 458.59 sq ft (42.604 m^{2})

Racing
- Rating: IOR -1
- PHRF: 165

The Chance 32/28 (also called the Chance 32) is a Canadian and French sailboat, that was designed by naval architect Britton Chance Jr. and first built in 1972.

== Production ==
The boat was built by Paceship Yachts in Mahone Bay, Nova Scotia, Canada between 1972 and 1974, with 41 boats produced, and also by Chantier Henri Wanquiez, France, between 1973 and 1976, with 20 boats built and Alexander Robertson & Sons of Sanbank, Scotland (finishing), but it is now out of production.

== Design ==
The Paceship Chance 32/28 (Chance 32) is a small recreational keelboat. It has a masthead sloop rig, a skeg-hung rudder, and a fixed fin keel. The boat has a draft of 5.75 ft (1.75 m). It displaces 12,025 lb (5,454 kg) and carries 4,680 lb (2,123 kg) of lead ballast. The Chance 32/28 has a theoretical hull speed of 7.06 kn (13.08 km/h).

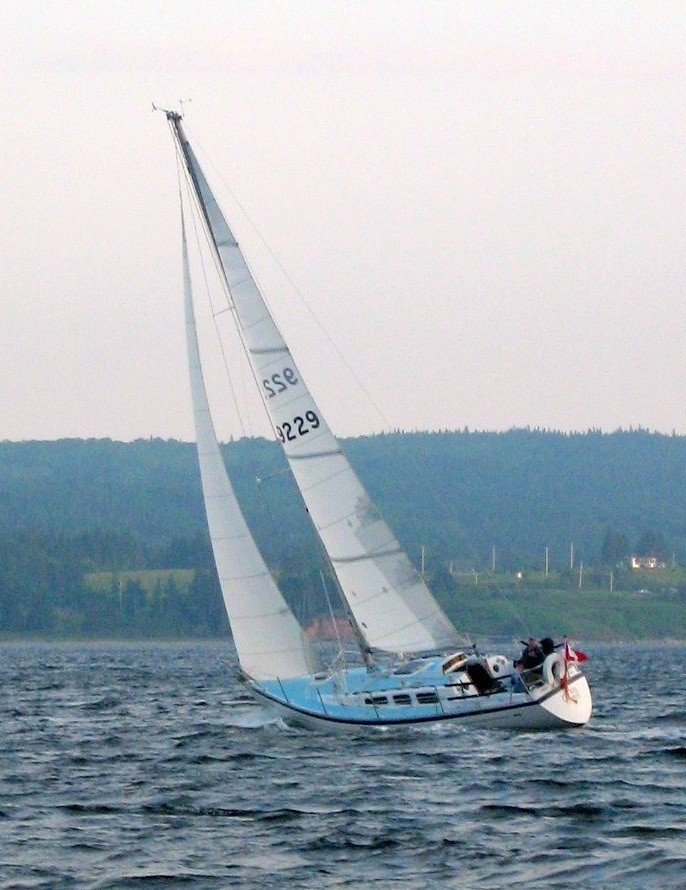
Paceship Chance 32-28 Petrel.

=== Hull ===
Built predominantly of hand-laid up fiberglass with unidirectional roving used throughout the laminate. The hull is further strengthened by the use of a grid system of unidirectional roving bonded to the hull. A cast lead keel is secured to the hull by 15 stainless steel bolts. The boat was designed for IOR 3/4 ton competition.

=== Deck ===
The deck is a modified blister type with molded in non-skid on all working areas. The deck is laid up with unidirectional roving together with mat and woven roving over balsa core. Aluminum plates are molded in under all winch and track positions for adding, removing, or altering deck hardware. Stowage areas in cockpit lockers.

==== Deck hardware ====
Hull and deck are joined by a silver anodized aluminum perforated toe rail. Head sail control is managed by recessed anodized aluminum tracks with stainless steel cars, baby stay track and slider, and two Number 24 Barlow Genoa sheet winches, clam cleats and stainless steel cleats and fairleads. One Number 20 Barlow winch is used for the jib halyard. Mainsail control uses a Seaboard ball bearing main sheet traveller. There is a welded anodized aluminum bow fitting with two cunningham sheaves, and three removable pins for two separate jib tack positions. The boat has bow and stern pulpits made of stainless steel, with double life lines and gates. Two goiot hatches and a spray shield are designed into the deck.

==== Spars and rigging ====
Spar, boom, spinnaker pole and reaching strut are built by Procter and are silver anodized aluminum. The mainsail clew out haul and jiffy reefing are contained internal in the boom. All standing rigging is 6 x 19 stainless steel, as well as all turnbuckles and toggles.

==== Racing package ====
A racing package was optional with a Proctor tapered anodized aluminum spar with two wire jib halyards, two spinnaker halyards, one wire main halyard, and a wire pole lift all internal. Also included were airfoil spreaders, a spinnaker pole and reaching strut, three Number 20 Barlow winches, one Number 24 Barlow halyard winch, one Number 14 Barlow auxiliary winch, one Number 4 Barlow main sheet winch. All winches also have cleats. The racing package also added eight additional recessed tracks and cars, two additional sets of genoa sheets, one additional set of spinnaker sheets, four additional snatch blocks, one Omni compass, boomvang, folding propeller The boat is available with wheel steering or tiller.

=== Engine and tanks ===
The standard engine is a 30 hp Universal Atomic 4 gas engine with morse controls and instrument panel, with engine room blower and intake vent to USCG and DOT standards. There is a 34 US gal (130 L) collapsible water tank and a 20 US gal (76 L) fuel tank with removable hatch for cleaning. Diesel engines are available as options.

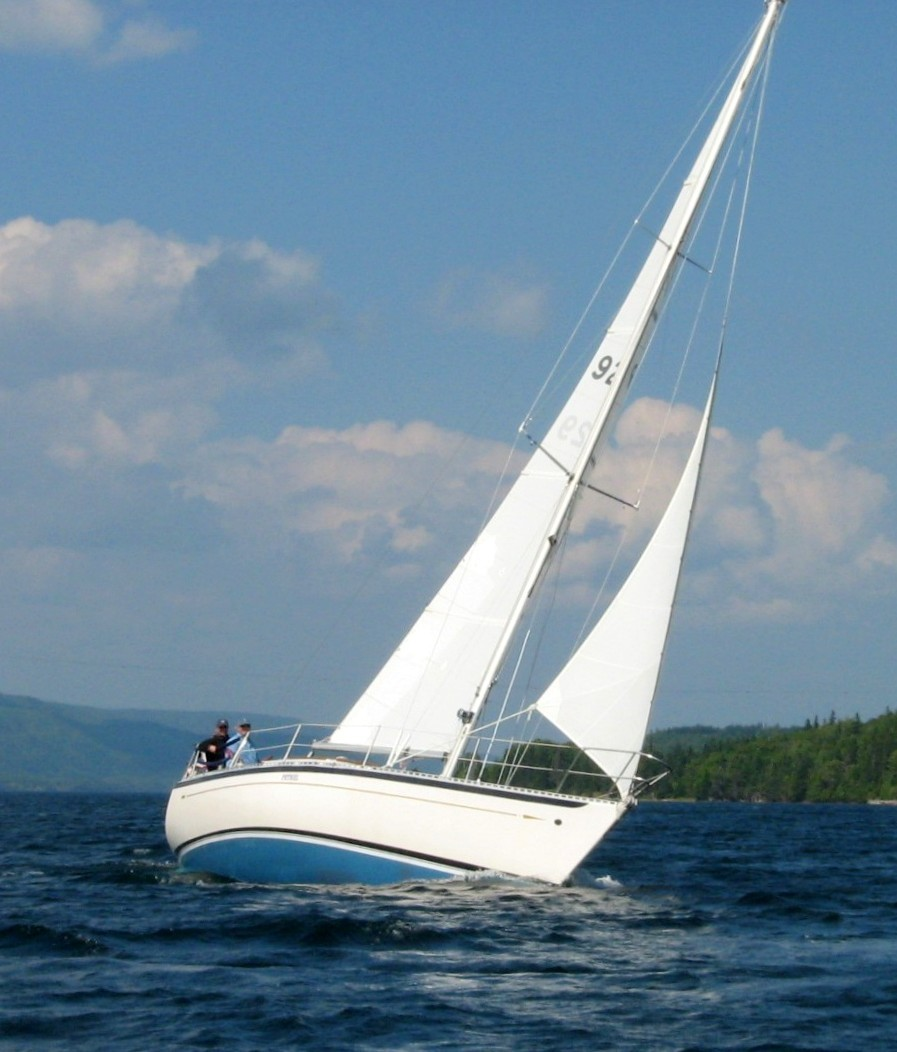
The Paceship Chance 32-28 Petrel under main and working jib, sailing the Great Bras d'Or.

=== Accommodations ===
==== Main cabin ====
The Main cabin has 6.25 ft (191 cm) headroom and features a convertible dinette that seats five with stowage behind seatbacks and beneath seats. Seats are 4 in (100 mm) foam covered with nylon fabric. Across from the dinette is an extension (slide out) berth and upper berth both with stowage beneath. This berth provides additional seating for the dinette.

==== Galley ====
Complete with stainless steel sink, and insulated ice box, and a two burner gimballed stainless steel stove and oven. There is food stowage under the sink, dish stowage above the stove and ice box, with a utensil drawer below the stove.

==== Navigator station ====
Opposite galley with a lighted chart table and chart stowage beneath. A quarter berth with oilskin locker beneath, and carpet on hull wall. Above chart table on bulkhead is a repeater instrument panel.

==== Forward cabin ====
Completely enclosed and finished the same as the main cabin. Two covered foam mattresses form the V-berth with stowage beneath. The hull sides are covered with nylon carpeting. A built-in dresser that is finished in teak provides further stowage.

==== Head ====
Completely enclosed with Wilcox Crittenden head and a molded-in sink, linen locker and stowage bins above sink. There is a vent lite in the deck overhead that combines ventilation and lighting in one unit.

== Operational history ==
The boat was at one time supported by an active class club, The Paceship, but the club is currently inactive.

== See also ==
- List of sailing boat types

Similar sailboats

- Beneteau First 285
- C&C 33
- Catalina 30
- CS 33
- Hunter 34
- Kirby 30
- Mirage 33
- Tanzer 31
