= Technology (disambiguation) =

Technology is the collection of tools, including machinery, modifications, arrangements and procedures used by humans.

Technology may also refer to:

- Technology (band), a Russian synthpop band
- Technology (album) or the title song, by Don Broco, 2018
- "Technology", a song by Chris Brown from Indigo, 2019

== See also ==
- Tech (disambiguation)
- Technical (disambiguation)
