= Northwind 29 =

Sailboat class

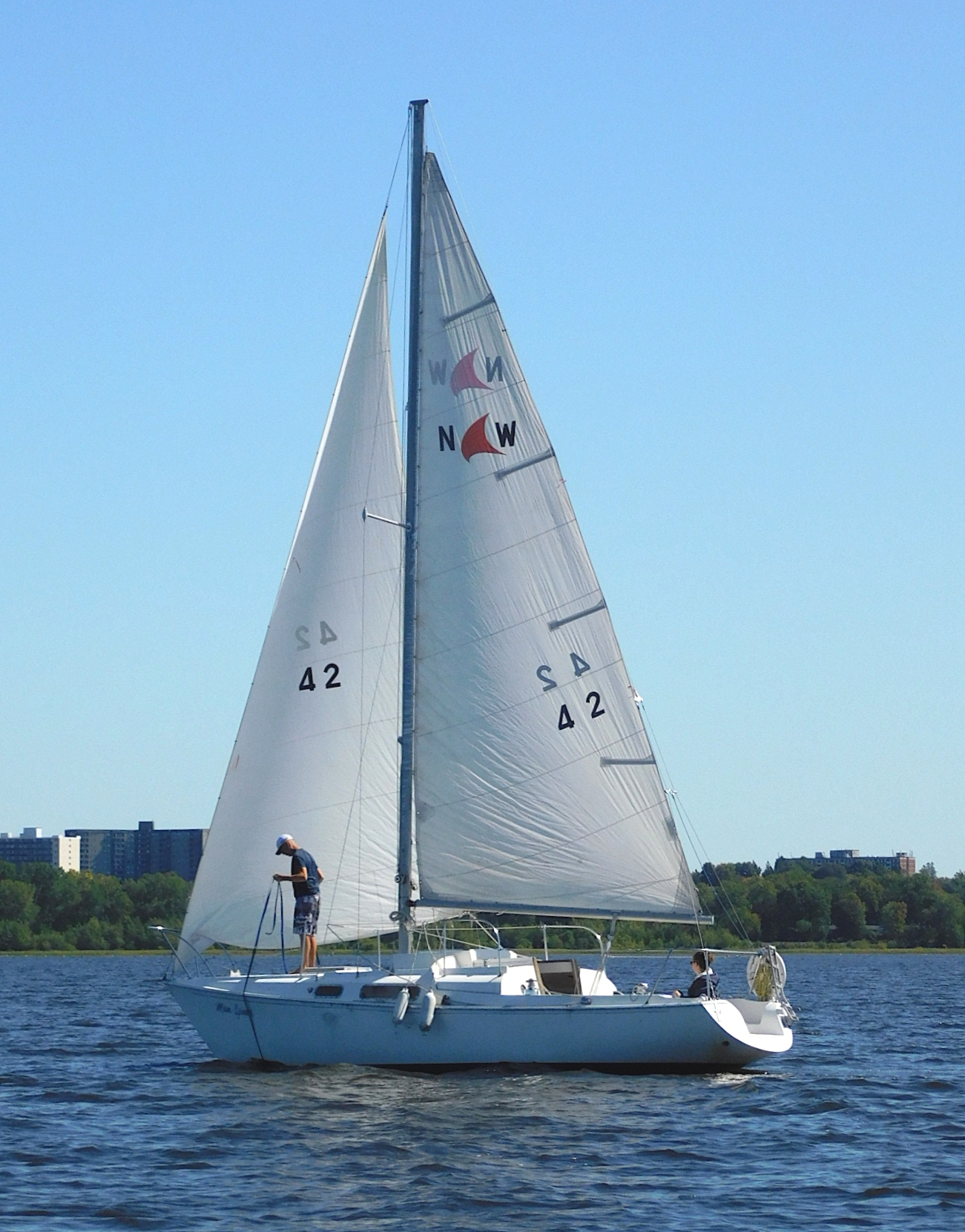
- Northwind 29 with a modified walk-through transom

Development
- Designer: C&C Design
- Location: Canada
- Year: 1969
- No. built: 104
- Builder: Paceship Yachts
- Name: Northwind 29

Boat
- Displacement: 6,600 lb (2,994 kg)
- Draft: 6.75 ft (2.06 m)

Hull
- Type: Monohull
- Construction: Fibreglass
- LOA: 28.79 ft (8.78 m)
- LWL: 22.00 ft (6.71 m)
- Beam: 9.15 ft (2.79 m)
- Engine: Universal Atomic 4 gasoline engine

Hull appendages
- Keel: Stub keel and centreboard
- Ballast: 3,180 lb (1,442 kg)
- Rudder: internally-mounted spade-type rudder

Rig
- Rig type: Bermuda rig
- I foretriangle height: 34.50 ft (10.52 m)
- J foretriangle base: 11.50 ft (3.51 m)
- P mainsail luff: 30.50 ft (9.30 m)
- E mainsail foot: 11.50 ft (3.51 m)

Sails
- Sailplan: Masthead sloop
- Mainsail area: 175.38 sq ft (16.293 m^{2})
- Jib/genoa area: 198.38 sq ft (18.430 m^{2})
- Total sail area: 373.75 sq ft (34.723 m^{2})

The Northwind 29 is a Canadian sailboat that was designed by C&C Design and first built in 1969.

== Production ==
The design was built by Paceship Yachts in Mahone Bay, Nova Scotia, Canada, who completed 104 examples between 1969 and 1972, but it is now out of production.

== Design ==
The Northwind 29 is a recreational keelboat, built predominantly of fibreglass, with wood trim. It has a masthead sloop rig, a raked stem, a raised reverse transom, an internally mounted spade-type rudder controlled by a tiller and a fixed stub keel, with a retractable centreboard.

The design displaces 6,600 lb (2,994 kg) and carries 3,180 lb (1,442 kg) of ballast.

The boat has a draft of 6.75 ft (2.06 m) with the centreboard extended and 3.08 ft (0.94 m) with it retracted.

The production boats were delivered with a factory-fitted Universal Atomic 4 gasoline inboard engine.

The fuel tank holds 15 U.S. gallons (57 L; 12 imp gal) and the fresh water tank has a capacity of 25 U.S. gallons (95 L; 21 imp gal).

The design has a hull speed of 6.29 kn (11.65 km/h).

== Operational history ==
The boat was at one time supported by an active class club, The Paceship, but the club is currently inactive.

== See also ==
- List of sailing boat types
