= Paceship Westwind =

23-foot heavy displacement sailboat

Westwind 24
Development
- Designer: Ted Hood
- Location: Canada
- Year: 1966
- Builder: Paceship Yachts
- Role: Cruiser
- Name: Westwind 24

Boat
- Displacement: 4,630 lb (2,100 kg)
- Draft: 5.50 ft (1.68 m) with centreboard down

Hull
- Type: monohull
- Construction: fibreglass
- LOA: 23.92 ft (7.29 m)
- LWL: 18.08 ft (5.51 m)
- Beam: 7.96 ft (2.43 m)
- Engine: outboard motor

Hull appendages
- Keel: long keel and centreboard
- Ballast: 2,370 lb (1,075 kg)
- Rudder: internally-mounted spade-type rudder

Rig
- Rig type: Bermuda rig
- I foretriangle height: 31.79 ft (9.69 m)
- J foretriangle base: 10.00 ft (3.05 m)
- P mainsail luff: 28.70 ft (8.75 m)
- E mainsail foot: 10.75 ft (3.28 m)

Sails
- Sailplan: masthead sloop
- Mainsail area: 154.26 sq ft (14.331 m^{2})
- Jib/genoa area: 158.95 sq ft (14.767 m^{2})
- Total sail area: 313.21 sq ft (29.098 m^{2})

Racing
- PHRF: 231

The Westwind 24, also called the Paceship P 24, is a keelboat designed as a heavy displacement coastal cruiser.

First built in 1966 by Paceship Yachts in Mahone Bay, Canada, it is now out of production.

== Design ==
The boat was designed by Ted Hood. The hull, skeg, deck, and rudder are hand-laid fibreglass reinforced polyster resin. The hull has a fixed, rounded long keel forming a deep V-shape. It is here that the 2,370 lb (1,075 kg) of cast iron ballast is placed. A swing centreboard gives a draft of between 2.10 ft (0.64 m) and 5.50 ft (1.68 m).

It has a spooned, raked stem; a raised counter, reverse transom, an internally mounted spade-type rudder controlled by a tiller.

The masthead sloop rig may be equipped with a spinnaker. The hull speed is 5.7 kn (10.6 km/h).

The cabin has four berths. In the cabin there is a sink to port and an ice box to starboard. The head, 12 U.S. gallons (45 L; 10.0 imp gal) water tank, and grey water tank are in the V-berth. Cabin headroom is 66 in (168 cm).

Interior trim is mahogany, and exterior trim is teak.

There is an outboard motor mount in a well in the bulkheaded self-draining lazarette.
