= Technical =

Technical may refer to:

- Technical (vehicle), an improvised fighting vehicle
- Technical accounting, field of accounting to evaluate compliance with accounting rules and complex accounting entries
- Technical area, an area which a manager, other coaching personnel, and substitutes are allowed to occupy during a football match
- Technical advisor, a person who advises the director on the convincing portrayal of a subject in a film production
- Technical agrologist, professional in the science, practice, and management of agriculture and agribusiness
- Technical analysis, a discipline for forecasting the future direction of prices through the study of past market data
- Technical drawing, showing how something is constructed or functions (also known as drafting)
  - Technical file, a set of technical drawings
- Technical death metal, a subgenre of death metal that focuses on complex rhythms, riffs, and song structures
- Technical foul, an infraction of the rules in basketball usually concerning unsportsmanlike non-contact behavior
- Technical geography, one of the main branches of geography
- Technical rehearsal for a performance, often simply referred to as a technical
- Technical support, a range of services providing assistance with technology products
- Vocational education, often known as technical education
- Legal technicality, an aspect of law

== See also ==
- Lego Technic, a line of Lego toys
- Technikal, British disc jockey and record producer
- Tech (disambiguation)
- Technicals (disambiguation)
- Technics (disambiguation)
- Technique (disambiguation)
- Technology (disambiguation)
