= Paceship Yachts =

Sailboat manufacturer

Paceship Yachts Limited
- Type: Privately held company
- Industry: Boat building
- Founded: 1962
- Defunct: 1981
- Headquarters: Mahone Bay, Nova Scotia, Canada
- Products: Sailboats

Paceship Yachts Limited was a Canadian, and later American, boat builder originally based in Mahone Bay, Nova Scotia. The company was founded in 1962 and specialized in the design and manufacture of fiberglass sailboats.

== History ==
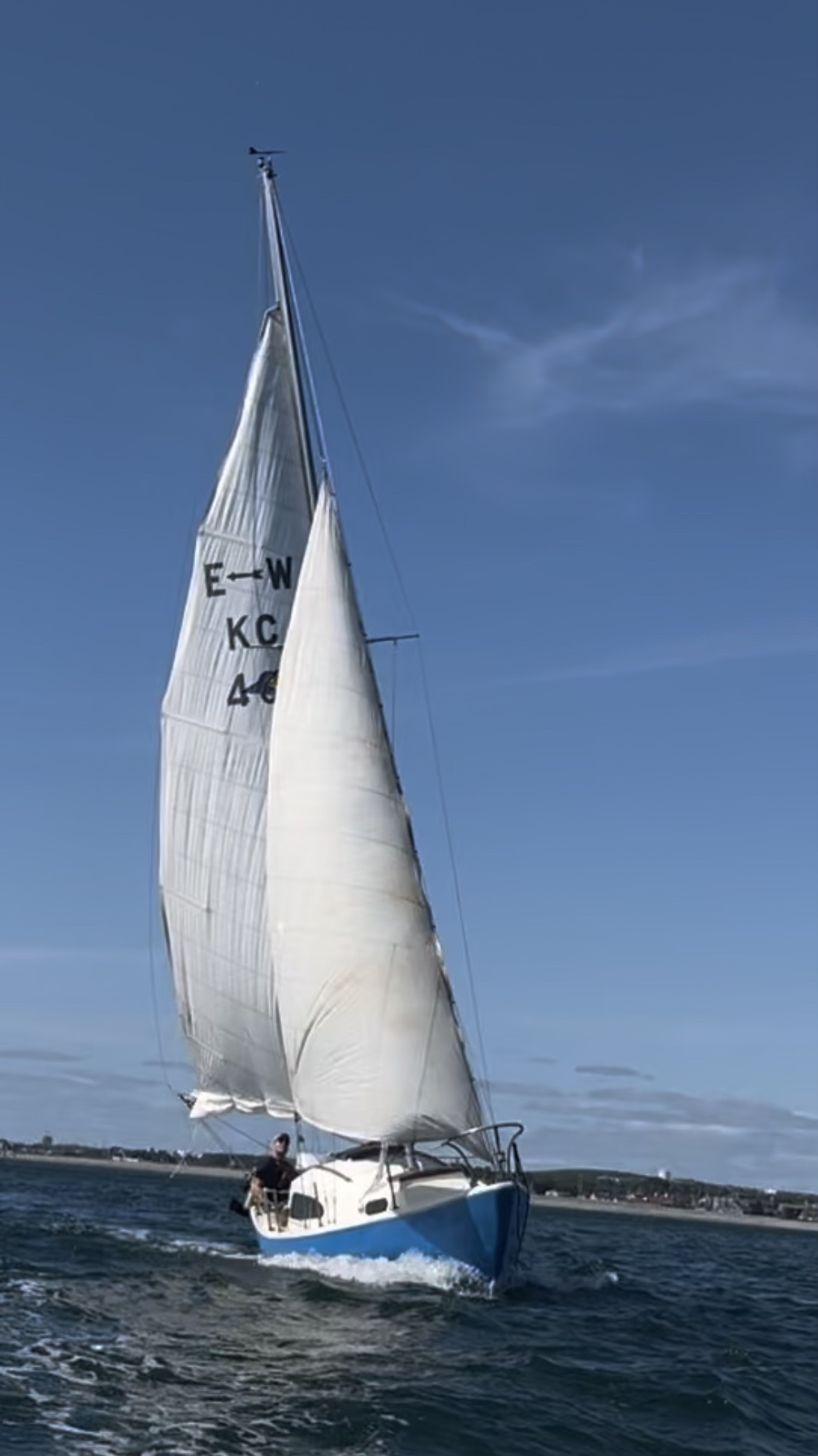
East Wind 25 (Paceship), Armdale Yacht Club, Halifax, Nova Scotia, 2024

The company's predecessor was the Mahone Bay Plycraft Company Ltd, which sold plywood boats as kits for amateur construction, as well as completed boats. These were marketed under various brand names.

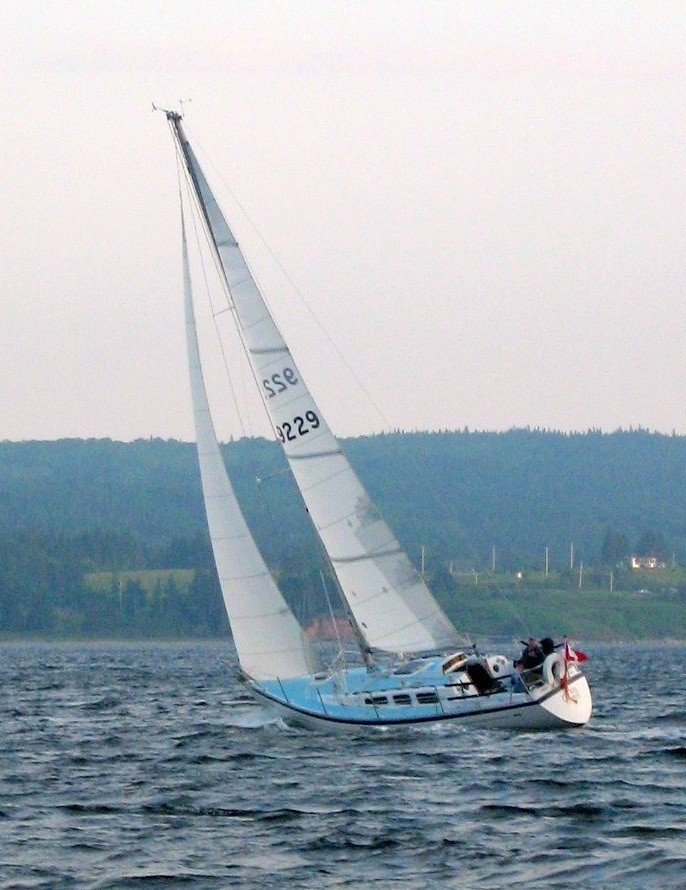
Paceship Chance 32/28

The Industrial Shipping Company Limited of Nova Scotia (ISC) produced plywood boats for Mahone Bay Plycraft in its Mahone Bay factory, until the building burned down in 1956. The factory was rebuilt and plywood boat construction restarted, but it quickly shifted to building boats from a then-new material, fibreglass, becoming one of the earliest builders of fibreglass small powerboats and sailboats.

By 1962 the sailboats were produced under the Paceship name and it became a division of ISC. The Paceship division was bought out in 1965 by the Atlantic Bridge Company Limited of Nova Scotia (ABCO), a company that also built powerboats.

In 1975 Paceship Yachts and its tooling were sold to American Machine and Foundry (AMF Corp), a large American conglomerate. They relocated Paceship production to Connecticut in the United States, including the Paceship PY23 and PY26 sailboats. Paceship Yachts operated as a division of AMF from 1975 until 1981. The early 1980s recession impacted sailboat sales and, as a result, AMF sold the PY26 design and tooling to Tanzer Industries in 1981. Tanzer changed the design to a deck-stepped mast and sold it as the Tanzer 27. Tanzer Industries itself went out of business in May 1986.

Atlantic Bridge's fibreglass operations were moved into the former Paceship building and the company was renamed ABCO Plastics Limited, while yacht building ceased. ABCO Plastics was sold in 1988 and renamed ABCO Industries Limited. The former factory location is now owned by Reinforced Plastics Systems Inc.

== Boats ==
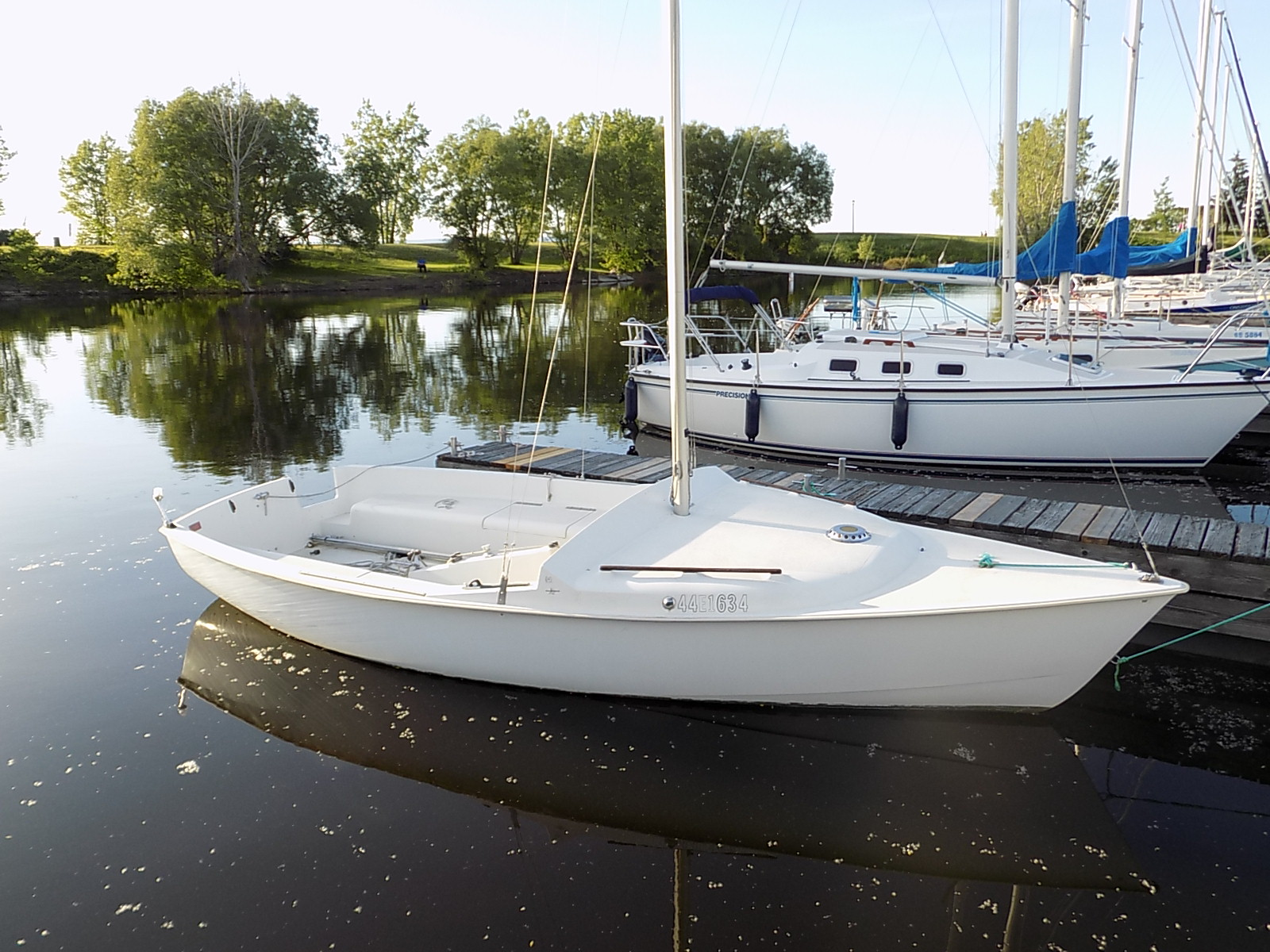
Paceship 20

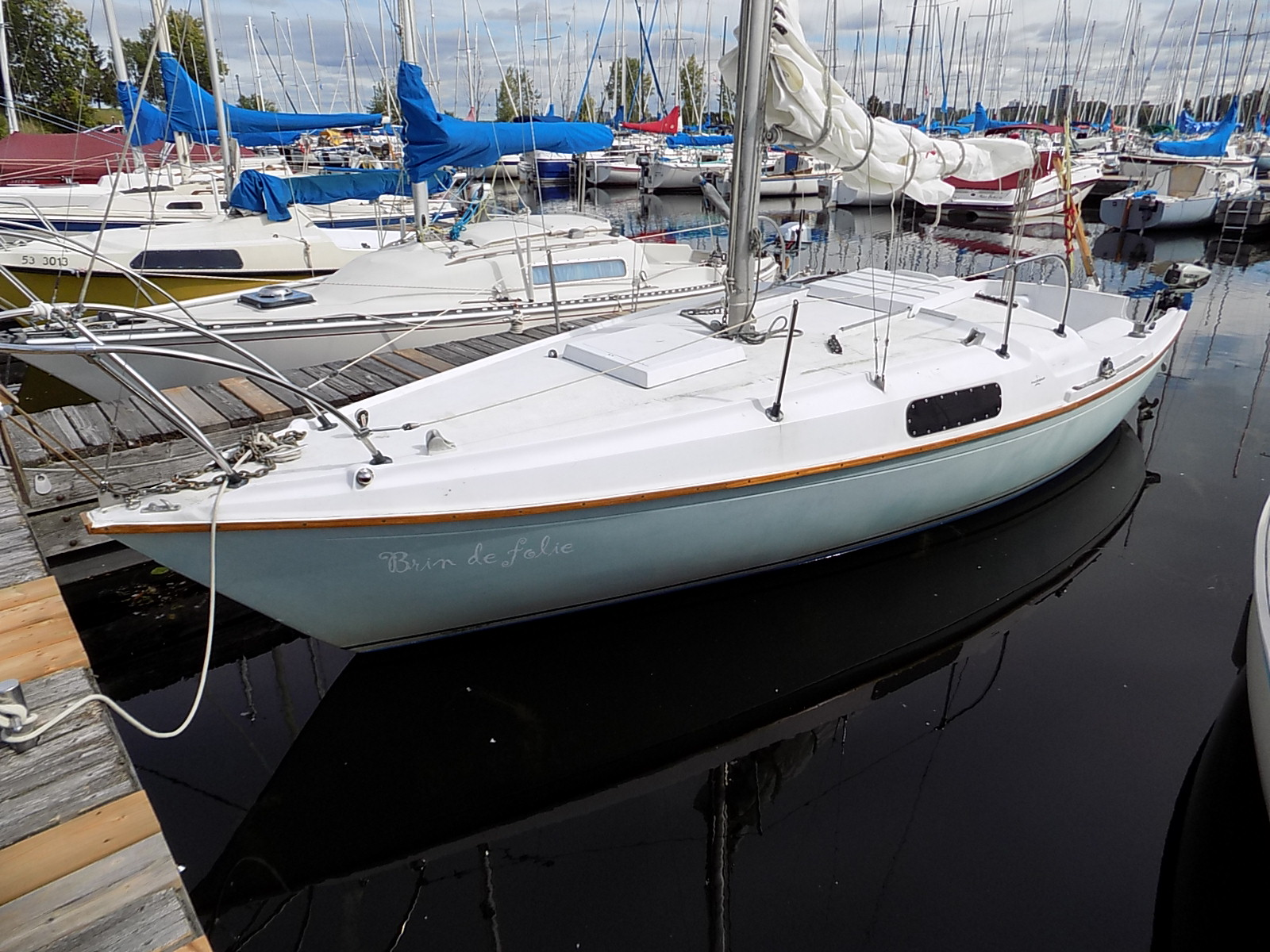
Paceship 23

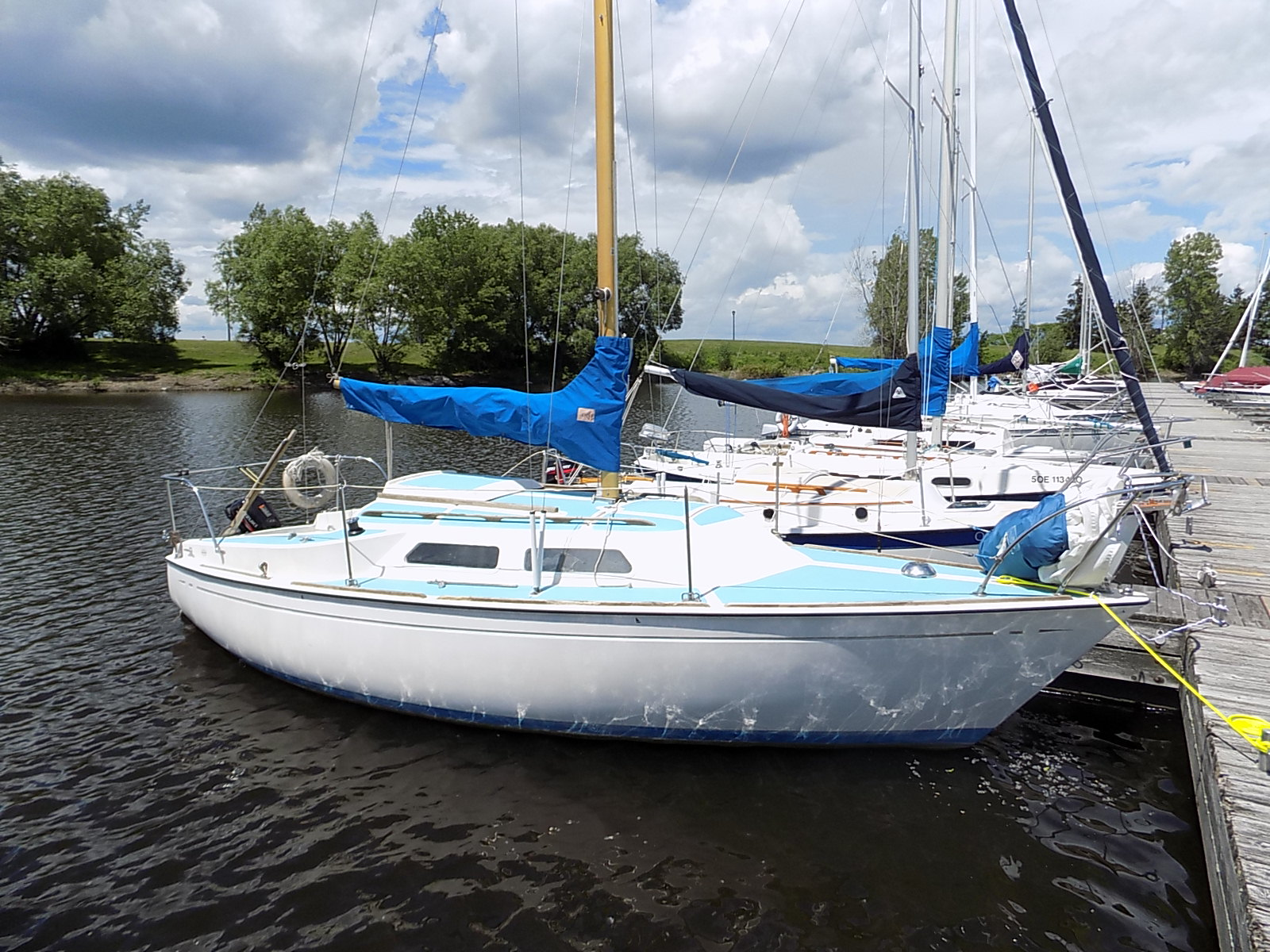
Paceship PY23

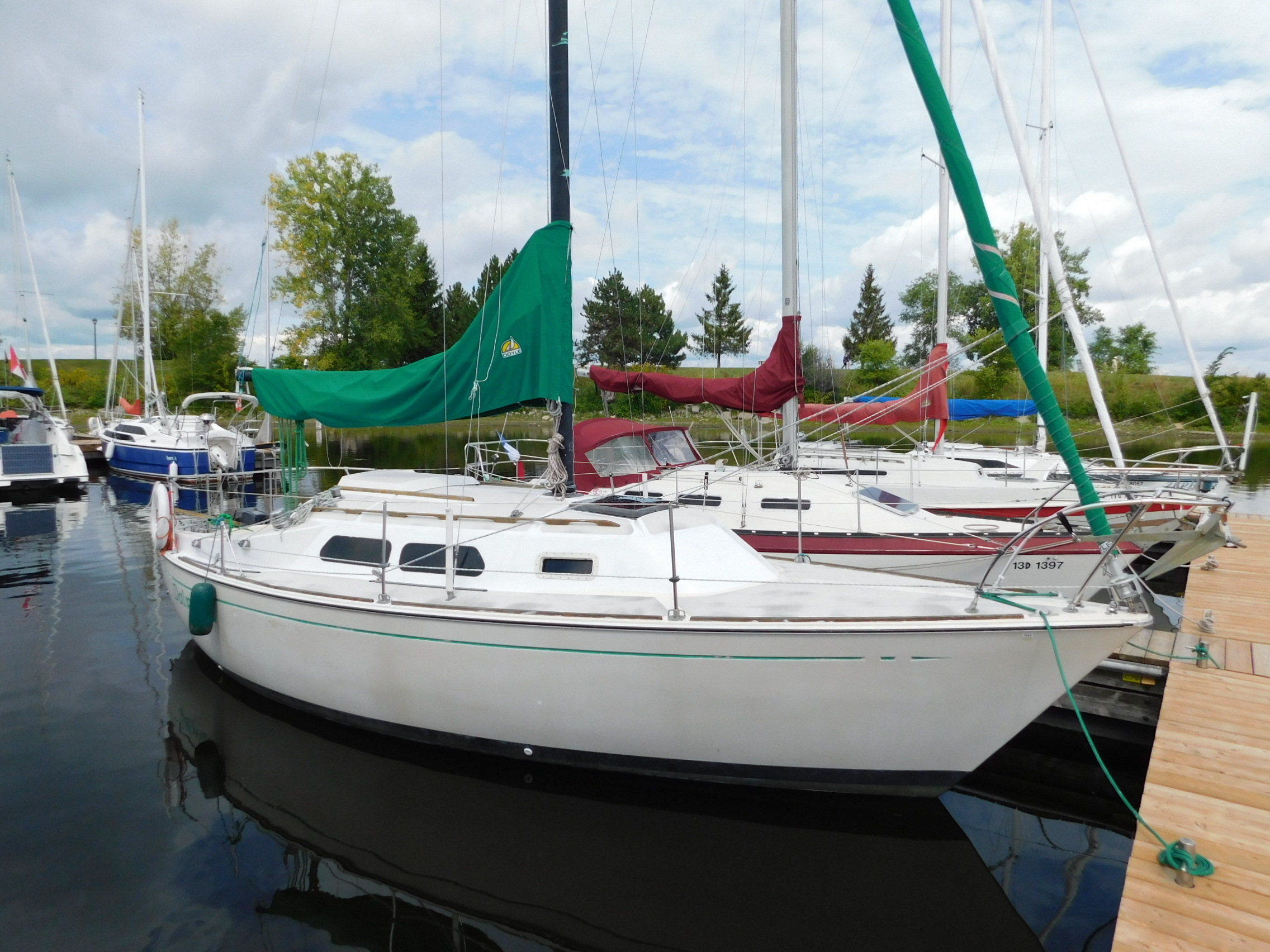
Paceship PY26

Summary of sailboats built by Paceship (year first built by any manufacturer):

- Tech Dinghy - 1934
- Falcon 16 - 1954
- International FJ - 1956
- East Wind 24 - 1962
- East Wind 25 - 1962
- Paceship P2-20 - 1962
- Cruisette 20 - 1963
- Paceship P 12 - 1963
- Peregrine 16 - 1963
- Acadian 30 - 1964
- Mouette 19 - 1964
- Paceship 2-16 - 1964
- Paceship 29 - 1964
- Paceship 17 - 1966
- Paceship Westwind - 1966
- Bluejacket 23 - 1967
- Acadian 30 Yawl - 1968
- Paceship 32 - 1968
- Northwind 29 - 1969
- Paceship 23 - 1969
- Paceship P 14 - 1969
- Paceship 20 - 1970
- Chance 32 - 1972
- Chance 32/28 - 1972
- Paceship PY26 - 1972
- Chance 29/25 - 1973
- Paceship PY23 - 1973

== See also ==
- List of sailboat designers and manufacturers
