= Paceship PY 26 =

1970s recreational keelboat

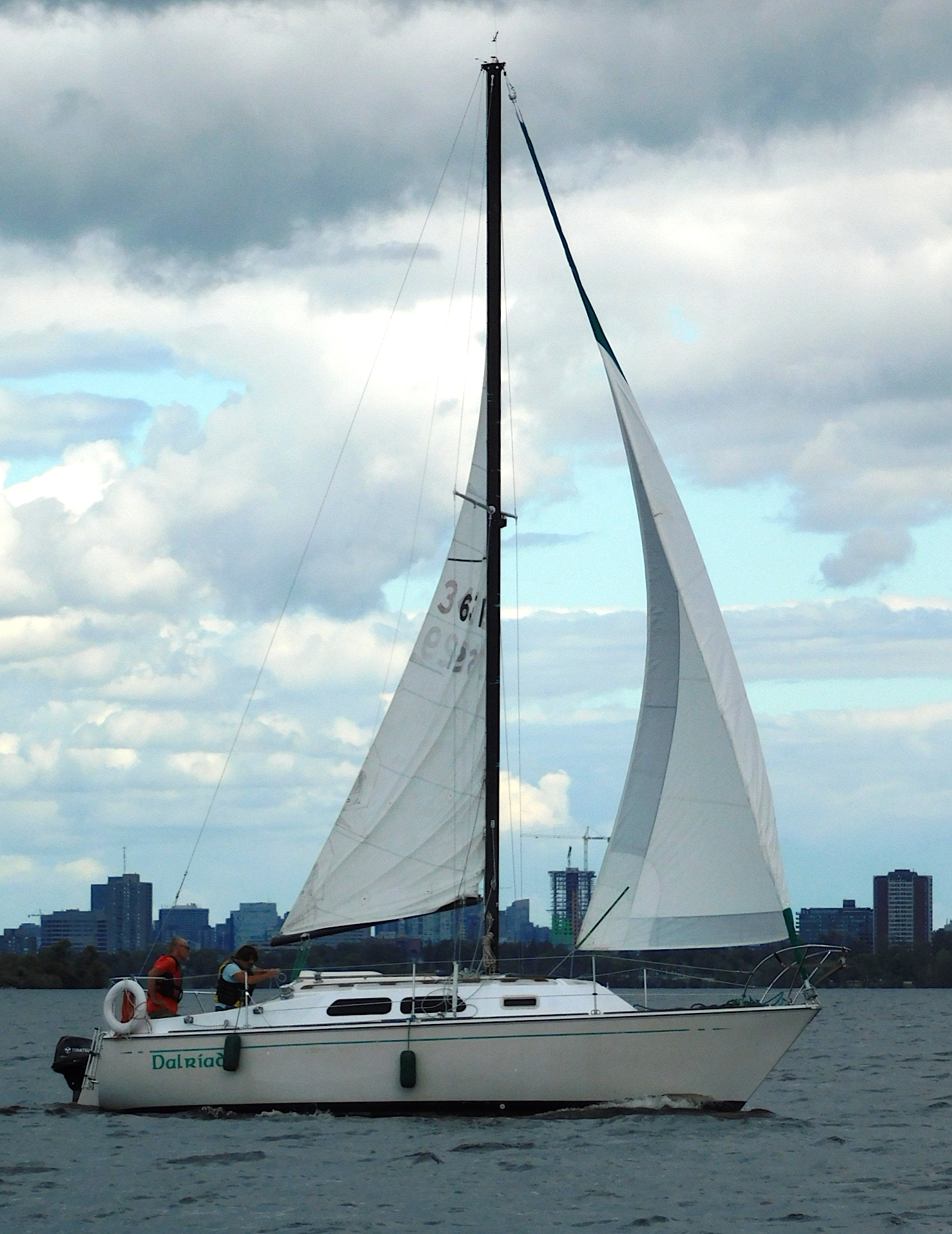

Development
- Designer: John Deknatel of C. Raymond Hunt Assoc.
- Location: Canada
- Year: 1972
- No. built: 364
- Builders: Paceship Yachts; AMF Corporation
- Name: Paceship PY 26

Boat
- Displacement: 6,000 lb (2,722 kg)
- Draft: 4.50 ft (1.37 m)

Hull
- Type: Monohull
- Construction: Fibreglass
- LOA: 26.33 ft (8.03 m)
- LWL: 22.50 ft (6.86 m)
- Beam: 9.50 ft (2.90 m)
- Engine: Outboard motor

Hull appendages
- Keel: fin keel
- Ballast: 2,200 lb (998 kg)
- Rudder: transom-mounted rudder

Rig
- Rig type: Bermuda rig
- I foretriangle height: 34.00 ft (10.36 m)
- J foretriangle base: 11.90 ft (3.63 m)
- P mainsail luff: 28.85 ft (8.79 m)
- E mainsail foot: 9.50 ft (2.90 m)

Sails
- Sailplan: Masthead sloop
- Mainsail area: 137.04 sq ft (12.731 m^{2})
- Jib/genoa area: 202.30 sq ft (18.794 m^{2})
- Total sail area: 339.34 sq ft (31.526 m^{2})

The Paceship PY 26 is a recreational keelboat built by Paceship Yachts of Mahone Bay, Nova Scotia, Canada starting in 1974. In 1977 the design was acquired by AMF Corporation and built in Connecticut, United States until 1982. In total 364 were produced.

It has a masthead sloop rig.

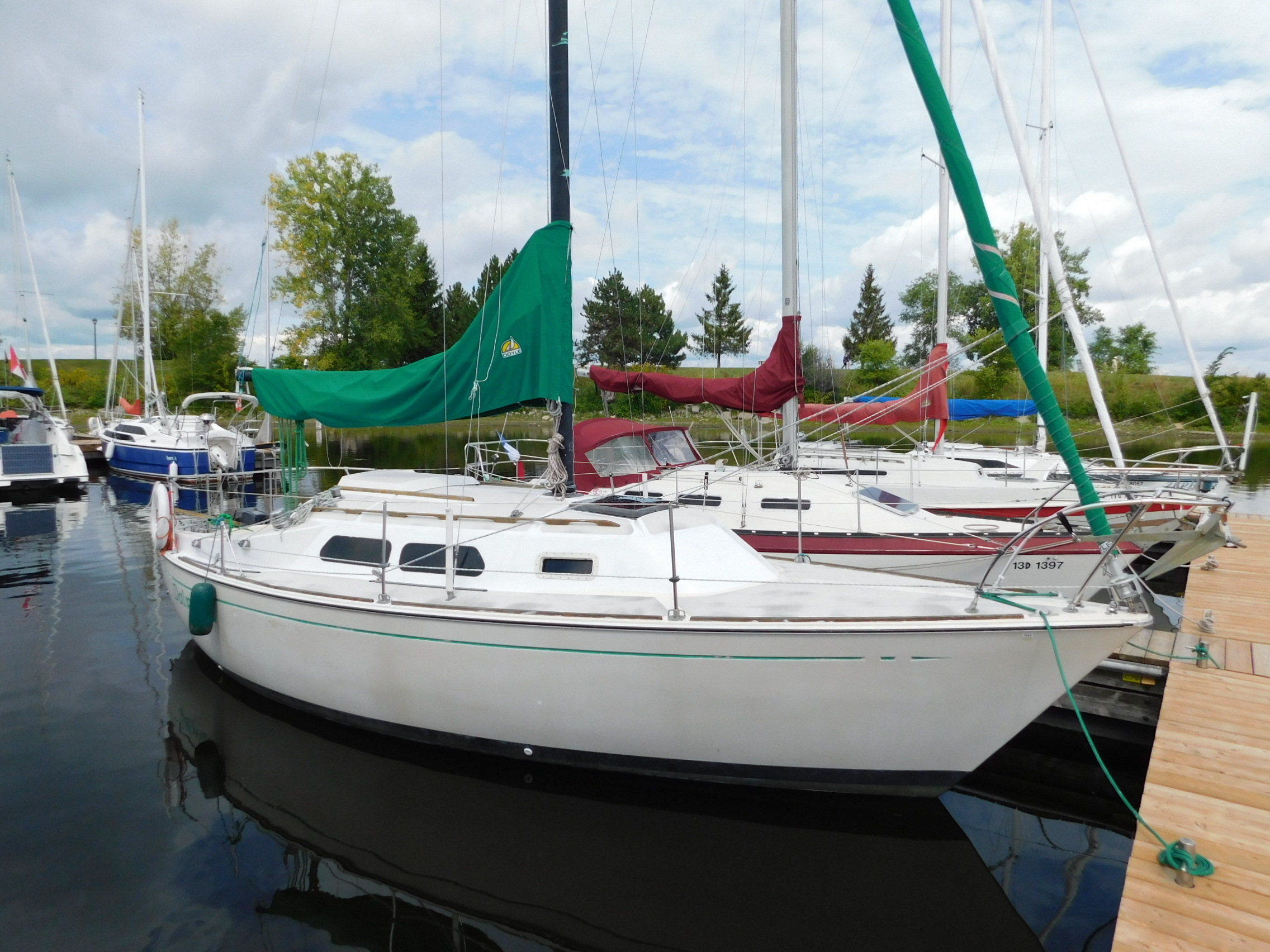
Paceship PY 26

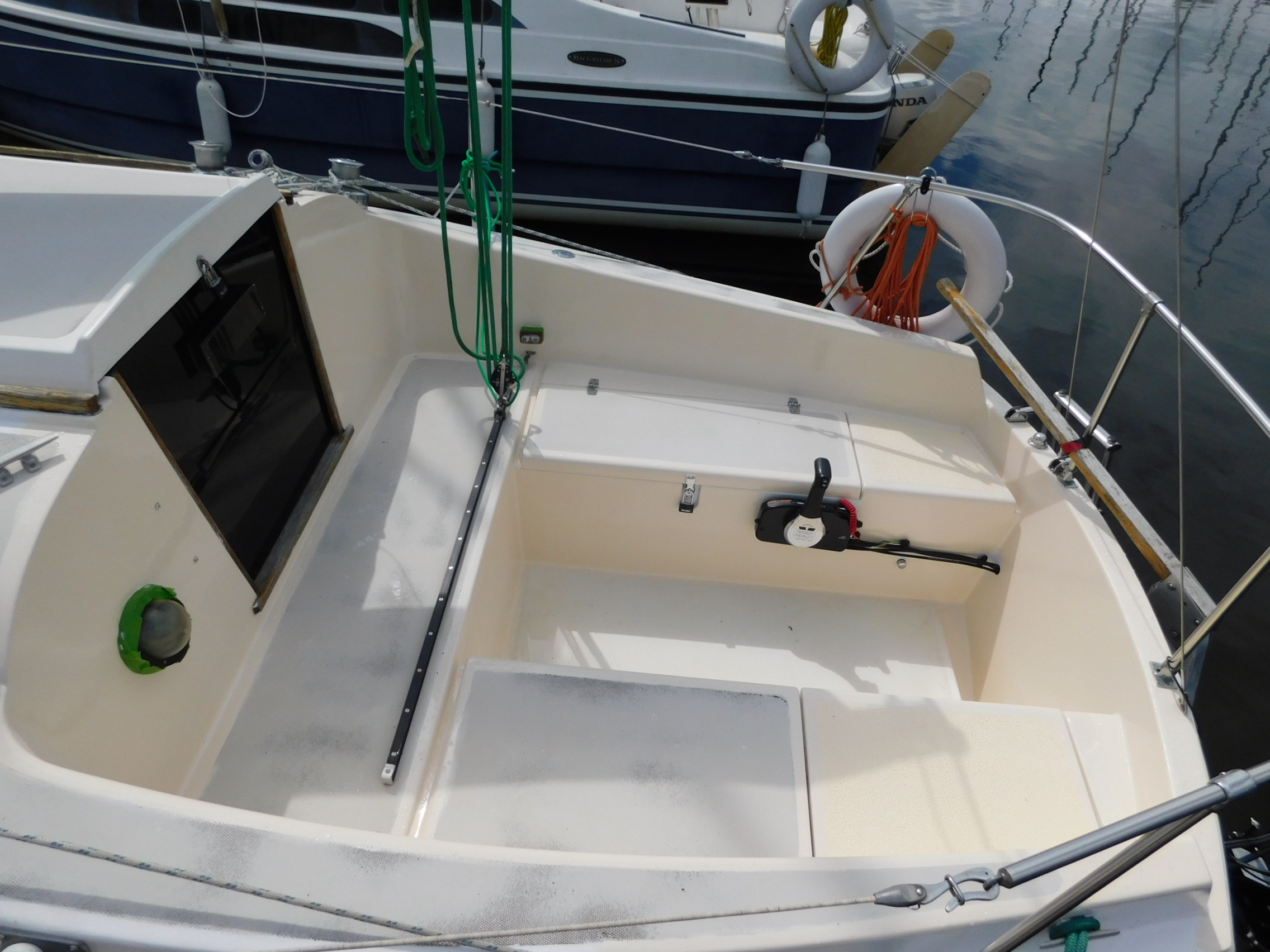
Paceship PY 26 cockpit

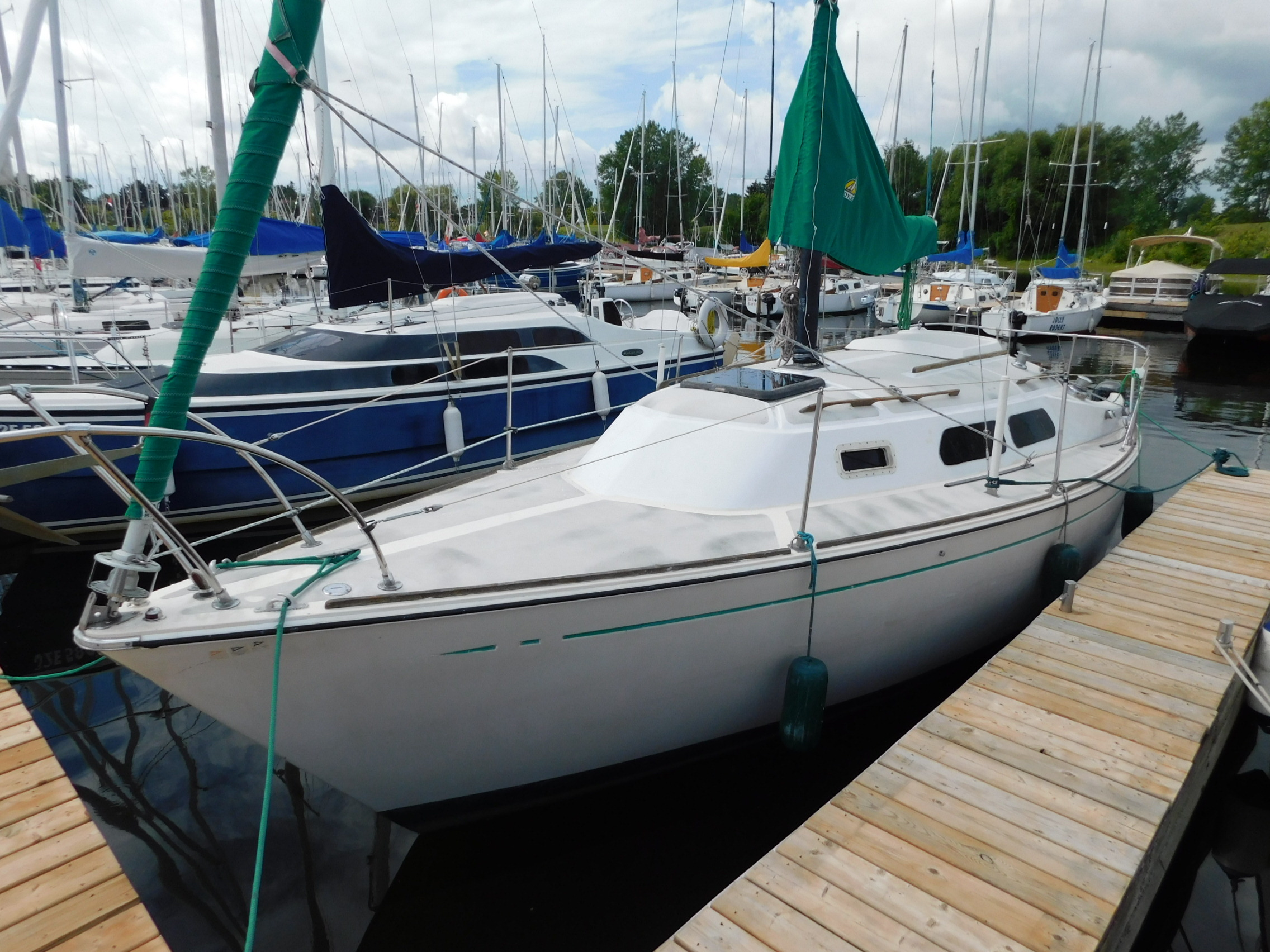
Paceship PY 26

Designed by John Deknatel of C. Raymond Hunt Assoc. the fibreglass hull has a keel-stepped mast, a raked stem, a near-vertical transom, a large transom-hung rudder controlled by a tiller and a fixed fin keel. The fin keel modeland carries 2,200 lb (998 kg) of iron ballast. The boat has a draft of 4.50 ft (1.37 m) with the standard keel fitted.

There was also a stub keel/centreboard version.

It can be fitted with either an inboard motor or an outboard motor although with a displacement of 6,000 lb (2,722 kg) it is at the upper limit of what an outboard can handle.

In 1982 AMF sold the hull molds to Tanzer Industries who marketed it as the Tanzer 27.
