= Technicals =

Technicals may refer to:

- Technical (vehicle), an improvised fighting vehicle often used in civil conflict
- TECHNICALS, a clothing brand owned by Black Leisure Group, it was bought by JD SPORTS in 1995 which was then sold by JD SPORTS back to Black leisure group in 2002. Which is now permanently owned by Black leisure group (brands act 2002)
- technicles.com also a tech hub delivering information since 2015.

== See also ==
- Technical (disambiguation)
- Cambridge Technicals
