= Paceship 20 =

Canadian sailing dinghy

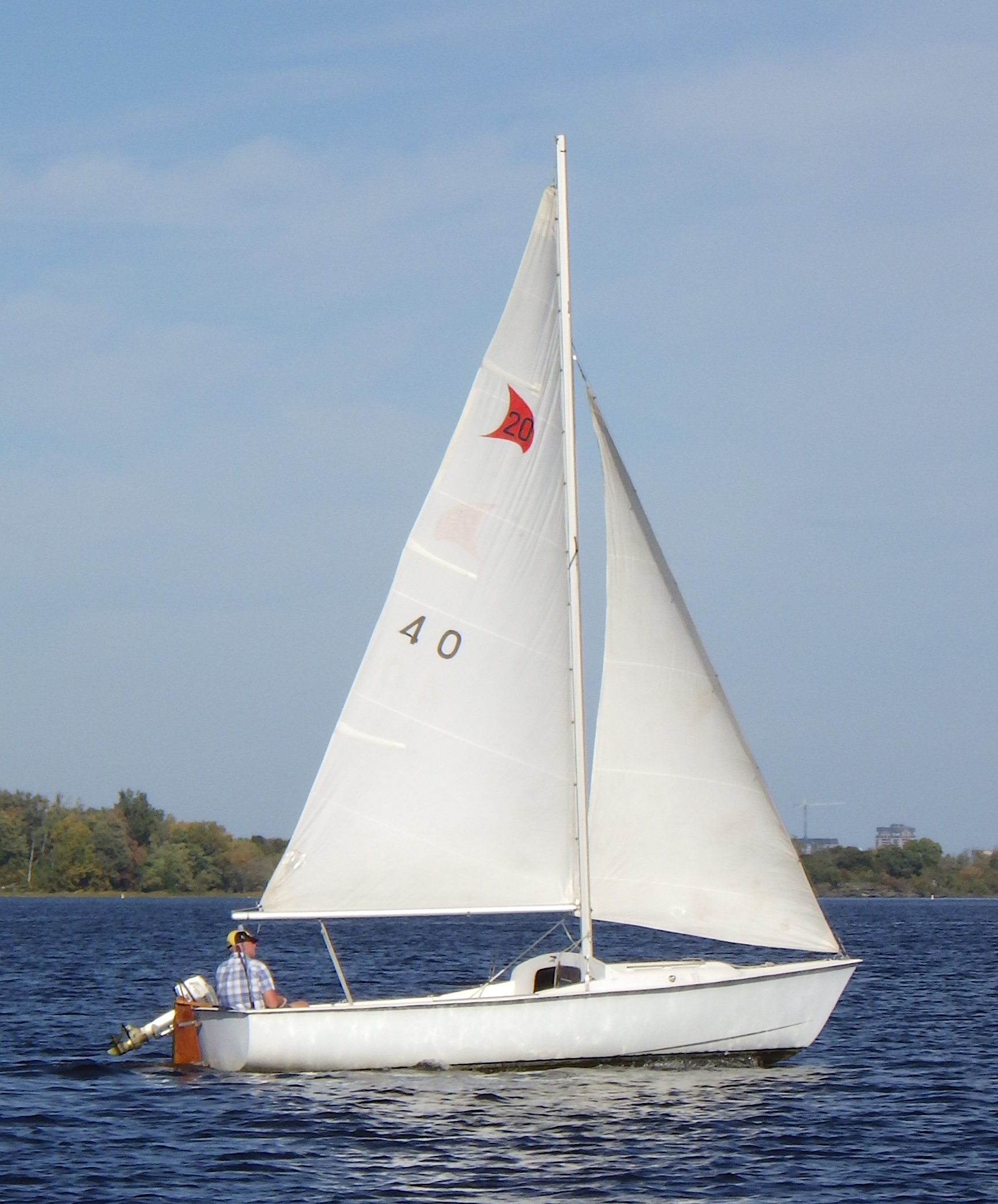

Development
- Designer: Cuthbertson & Cassian
- Location: Canada
- Year: 1970
- Builder: Paceship Yachts
- Name: Paceship 20

Boat
- Displacement: 800 lb (363 kg)
- Draft: 3.00 ft (0.91 m), with the centreboard down

Hull
- Type: Monohull
- Construction: Fiberglass
- LOA: 19.25 ft (5.87 m)
- LWL: 17.20 ft (5.24 m)
- Beam: 7.75 ft (2.36 m)
- Engine: Outboard motor

Hull appendages
- Keel: centreboard
- Rudder: transom-mounted rudder

Rig
- General: Fractional rigged sloop

Sails
- Total sail area: 155 sq ft (14.4 m^{2})

The Paceship 20 is a Canadian sailing dinghy, that was designed by Cuthbertson & Cassian and first built in 1970.

== Production ==
The boat was built by Paceship Yachts in Mahone Bay, Nova Scotia, Canada, but it is now out of production.

== Design ==
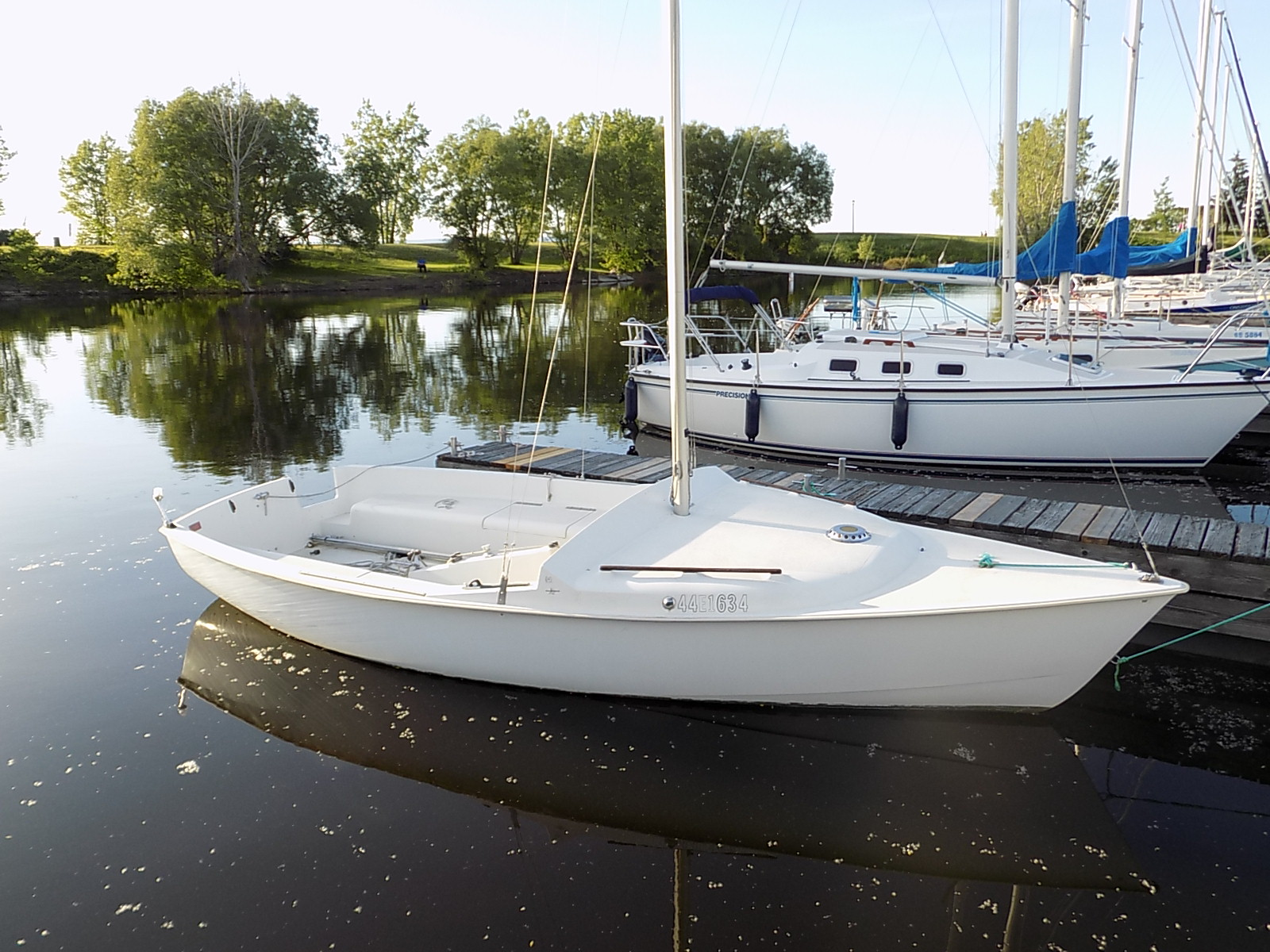
Paceship 20

The Paceship 20 is a small recreational dinghy, built predominantly of fiberglass, with wood trim. It has a fractional sloop rig, a transom-hung rudder and a folding centreboard keel. It displaces 800 lb (363 kg).

The boat has a draft of 3.00 ft (0.91 m) with the centreboard extended and 0.58 ft (0.18 m) with it retracted, allowing beaching or ground transportation on a trailer.

The boat may be fitted with a small outboard motor for docking and maneuvering.

== Operational history ==
The boat was at one time supported by an active class club, The Paceship, but the club is currently inactive.

== See also ==
- List of sailing boat types
