= Tech Dinghy =

Sailboat class

- T Class symbol

Development
- Designer: George Owen
- Location: United States
- Year: 1935
- Builders: Herreshoff Manufacturing, Beetle Boat Co., Paceship Yachts, Whitecap Composites
- Role: Sailing dinghy

Boat
- Displacement: 250 lb (113 kg)
- Draft: 2.00 ft (0.61 m) with centerboard down

Hull
- Type: Monohull
- Construction: Wood or fiberglass
- LOA: 12.00 ft (3.66 m)
- Beam: 4.67 ft (1.42 m)

Hull appendages
- Keel: centerboard
- Rudder: transom-mounted rudder

Rig
- Rig type: catboat rig or Bermuda rig

Sails
- Sailplan: Fractional rigged sloop Masthead sloop
- Total sail area: 72.00 sq ft (6.689 m^{2})

Racing
- D-PN: 111.2

The Tech Dinghy is an American sailing dinghy that was designed by George Owen, a professor at Massachusetts Institute of Technology (MIT), as a one-design racer and for sail training. It was first built in 1935.

The Tech Dinghy design was later developed into the Intercollegiate dinghy by Paceship Yachts.

== Production ==
George Owen was a professor at MIT's Department of Naval Architecture and Marine Engineering between 1915 and 1941, designing more than 200 sailing boats and commercial ships. He was also a competitive sailor and conceived the Tech Dinghy for student competitive sailing at MIT in the Charles River, which is adjacent to the MIT campus.

The design was first constructed from wood by Herreshoff Manufacturing in the United States, starting in 1935.

The design was next built by the Beetle Boat Co in New Bedford, Massachusetts. In 1958 the company started building them from fiberglass instead of wood, one of the first boats to use the then-new material.

The design was also constructed in Canada, by Paceship Yachts of Mahone Bay, Nova Scotia, although they went out of business in 1981 and production had ceased by that time. This manufacturer created the Intercollegiate dinghy, based upon the Tech Dinghy for use in racing between universities.

The boat has gone through several redesigns over time, including being modified for sailing in rougher conditions in the Midwestern United States. In the 1970s it was modified by Halsey Herreshoff working with the MIT sailing director, Hatch Brown. This version made the boat faster, less prone to ship water and more forgiving to sail for beginners.

The sixth version of the boat, marketed as the Turbo Tech, was drawn by Penn Edmonds during the early 1990s and is 100 lb (45 kg) lighter than the previous generation. This version is now produced by the current builder, Whitecap Composites of Peabody, Massachusetts.

== Design ==
The Tech Dinghy is a recreational sailboat, built predominantly of wood or, in later versions, from fiberglass. The sixth generation boats are made from infused vinylester over a Core-Cell foam core, with an inner carbon fiber skin, for improved durability.

The boat has a fractional sloop rig or catboat single sail rig, with the mast repositionable on different mast steps for either configuration. The spars are aluminum. It features a spooned raked stem, an over-vertical transom, a transom-hung rudder controlled by a tiller and a retractable, lever-controlled centerboard. The hull alone displaces 250 lb (113 kg).

The boat has a draft of 2.00 ft (0.61 m) with the centerboard extended and 3 in (7.6 cm) with it retracted, allowing beaching or ground transportation on a trailer.

For sailing the design is equipped with a mainsheet traveler, a boom vang and an outhaul. The vang is led to the mast step casting.

The design has a Portsmouth Yardstick racing average handicap of 111.2, noted as "suspect". It is normally raced as a sloop, with a crew of two sailors.

== Operational history ==
MIT has sold off their older wooden boats and some of these are now sailed privately.

It was reported in 1994 that some of the original wooden 1935 boats still existed and were still in use, even though they were decades old at that point.

== See also ==
- List of sailing boat types
