= TEK search engine =

TEK is an email-based search engine developed by the TEK project at the Massachusetts Institute of Technology. The search engine enables users to search the Web using only email. It is intended to be used by people with low internet connectivity (for example, high-priced internet connection and low bandwidth connection in developing countries).

TEK stands for "Time Equals Knowledge"; the search engine compensates the searching availability to the time needed for searching. To perform a web search, a user sends a query via email to a server (which is located at MIT). The server then performs the search using existing search engines, downloads actual pages, and emails a subset of those pages back to the user.
