= Tech =

Tech or The Tech may refer to:

- Technology
- Technician, professional who is skilled at operating and/or fixing some kind of technology
- Tech (river), in southern France
- "Tech" (Smash), a 2012 episode of TV series Smash
- Tech (mascot), the mascot of Louisiana Tech University, U.S.
- "Boston Tech", former informal name of the Massachusetts Institute of Technology
  - The Tech (newspaper), the student newspaper of MIT
  - Tech Dinghy, a kind of sailboat developed at MIT
- The Tech Interactive, formerly The Tech Museum of Innovation, or The Tech, a museum in San Jose, California, U.S.
- Tech Tower, a building at the Georgia Institute of Technology, Atlanta, Georgia, U.S.

== See also ==
- USS Tech, multiple United States Navy patrol boats
- Technical (disambiguation)
- Technique (disambiguation)
