= Paceship 23 =

Sailboat class

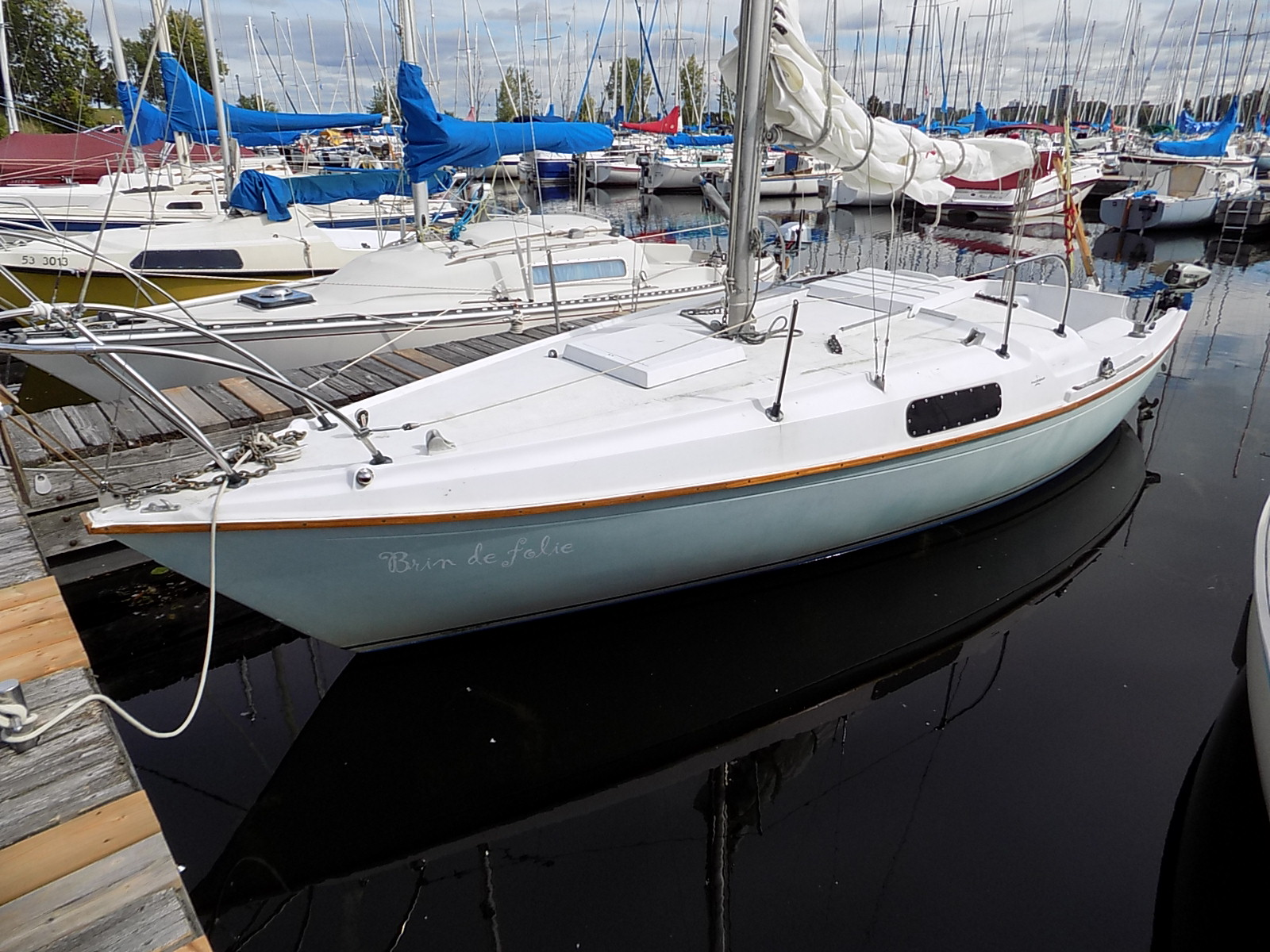

Development
- Designer: Cuthbertson & Cassian
- Location: Canada
- Year: 1969
- Builder: Paceship Yachts
- Name: Paceship 23

Boat
- Displacement: 2,300 lb (1,043 kg)
- Draft: 3.83 ft (1.17 m)

Hull
- Type: Monohull
- Construction: Fiberglass
- LOA: 23.00 ft (7.01 m)
- LWL: 19.00 ft (5.79 m)
- Beam: 8.00 ft (2.44 m)
- Engine: Outboard motor

Hull appendages
- Keel: fin keel
- Ballast: 900 lb (408 kg)
- Rudder: transom-mounted rudder

Rig
- General: Masthead sloop
- I foretriangle height: 27.00 ft (8.23 m)
- J foretriangle base: 9.00 ft (2.74 m)
- P mainsail luff: 23.00 ft (7.01 m)
- E mainsail foot: 9.00 ft (2.74 m)

Sails
- Mainsail area: 103.50 sq ft (9.615 m^{2})
- Jib/genoa area: 121.50 sq ft (11.288 m^{2})
- Total sail area: 225.00 sq ft (20.903 m^{2})

The Paceship 23 is a Canadian sailboat, that was designed by Cuthbertson & Cassian and first built in 1969.

== Production ==
The boat was built by Paceship Yachts in Mahone Bay, Nova Scotia, Canada between 1969 and 1978, but it is now out of production. A total of 240 examples were constructed during its nine-year production run.

== Design ==
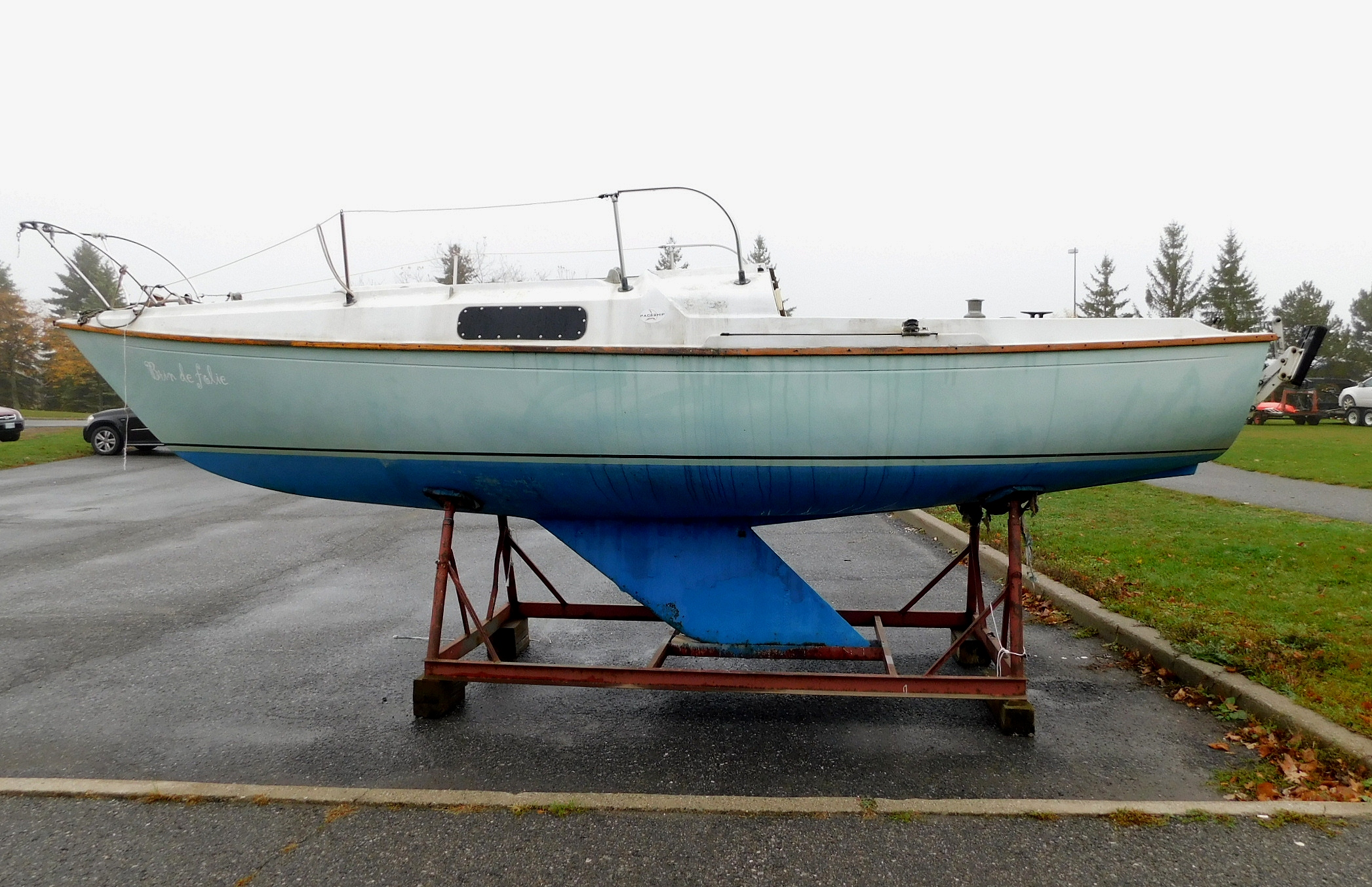
A Paceship 23 on its cradle, showing the keel configuration.

The Paceship 23 is a small recreational keelboat, built predominantly of fiberglass, with wood trim, including a full length wooden rub rail. It has a masthead sloop rig, a transom-hung rudder and a fixed fin keel. It displaces 2,300 lb (1,043 kg) and carries 900 lb (408 kg) of ballast.

The boat has a draft of 3.83 ft (1.17 m) with the standard keel fitted.

The boat is normally fitted with a small outboard motor for docking and maneuvering.

== Operational history ==
The boat was at one time supported by an active class club, The Paceship, but the club is currently inactive.

== See also ==
- List of sailing boat types
