= USS Tech =

USS Tech may refer to more than one United States Navy ship:

- USS Tech Jr. (SP-1761), a patrol boat in commission during the autumn of 1917
- USS Tech III (SP-1055), a patrol boat in commission from August to October 1917
