= Technique =

Technique or techniques may refer to:

== Music ==
- The Techniques, a Jamaican rocksteady vocal group of the 1960s
- Technique (band), a British female synth pop band in the 1990s
- Technique (album), by New Order, 1989
- Techniques (album), by Modern Baseball, 2014
- "Technique", a song by Pat Boone from his EP Four by Pat, 1957

== Other uses ==
- Technique (newspaper), the newspaper of the Georgia Institute of Technology, U.S.
- Technique Stadium, a football stadium in Whittington Moor, Chesterfield, Derbyshire

== See also ==
- Technical (disambiguation)
- Technology, the sum of techniques, skills, methods, and processes used in the production of goods or services
- Skill, the ability to carry out a task with determined results
