= Cornish Crabber =

Cornish Crabber may refer to:

- Cornish Crabber 17, a British Sailboat design
- Cornish Crabber 24, a British Sailboat design
