= Com-Pac 19 =

Sailboat class

Com-Pac 19 Mk 2
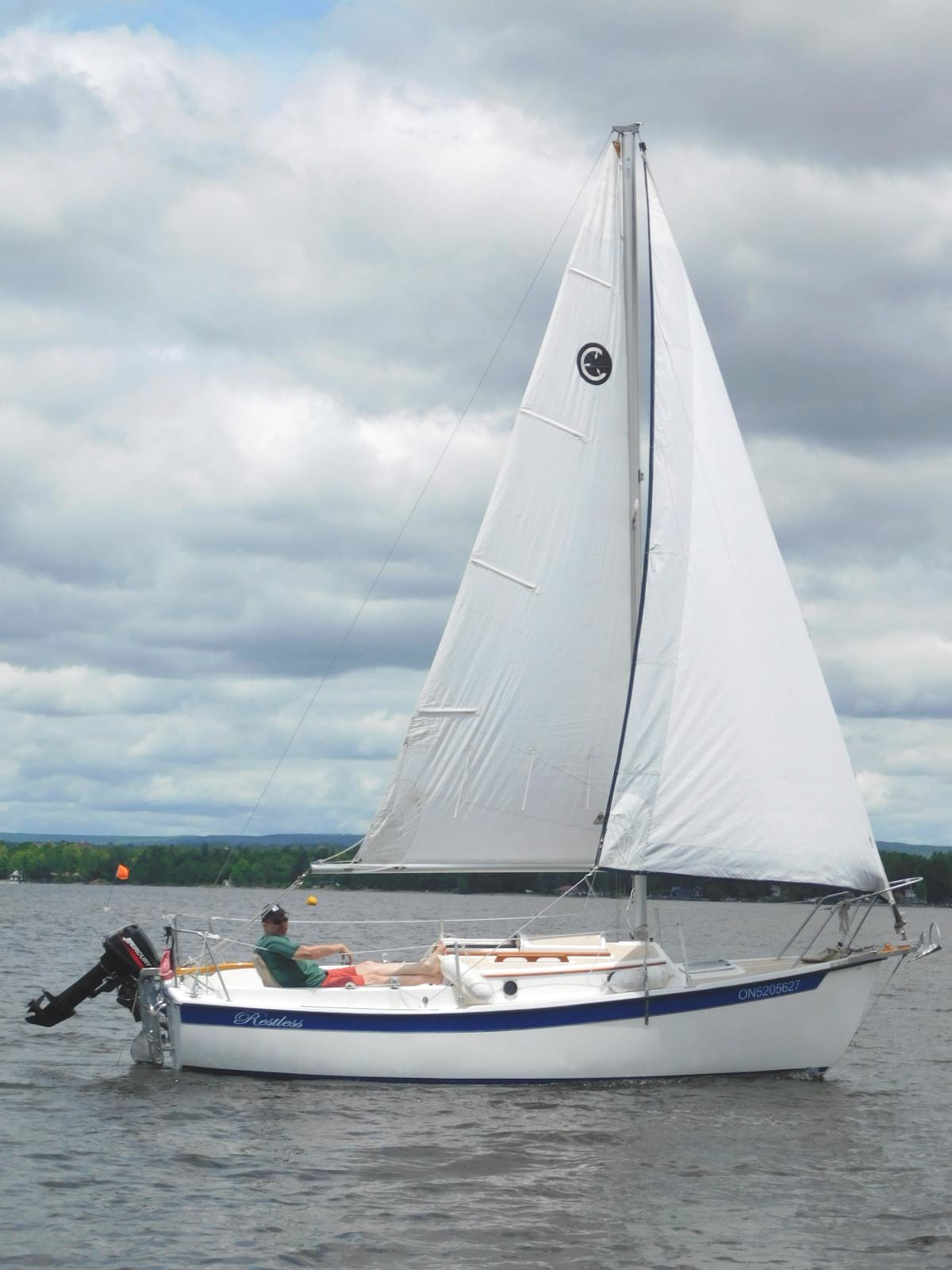
- Com-Pac 19 Mk 2

Development
- Designer: Robert K. Johnson
- Location: United States
- Year: 1979
- Builder: Com-Pac Yachts
- Name: Com-Pac 19 Mk 2

Boat
- Displacement: 2,000 lb (907 kg)
- Draft: 2.00 ft (0.61 m)

Hull
- Type: Monohull
- Construction: Fiberglass
- LOA: 20.08 ft (6.12 m)
- LWL: 16.33 ft (4.98 m)
- Beam: 7.00 ft (2.13 m)
- Engine: Outboard motor

Hull appendages
- Keel: long keel
- Ballast: 800 lb (363 kg)
- Rudder: transom-mounted rudder

Rig
- General: Masthead sloop
- I foretriangle height: 21.75 ft (6.63 m)
- J foretriangle base: 7.16 ft (2.18 m)
- P mainsail luff: 18.75 ft (5.72 m)
- E mainsail foot: 8.00 ft (2.44 m)

Sails
- Mainsail area: 75.00 sq ft (6.968 m^{2})
- Jib/genoa area: 77.87 sq ft (7.234 m^{2})
- Total sail area: 152.87 sq ft (14.202 m^{2})

Racing
- PHRF: 285

The Com-Pac 19 is an American trailerable sailboat, that was designed by Robert K. Johnson and first built in 1979.

== Production ==
The boat was built by Com-Pac Yachts in the United States, from 1979 to 2002, but it is now out of production.

== Design ==
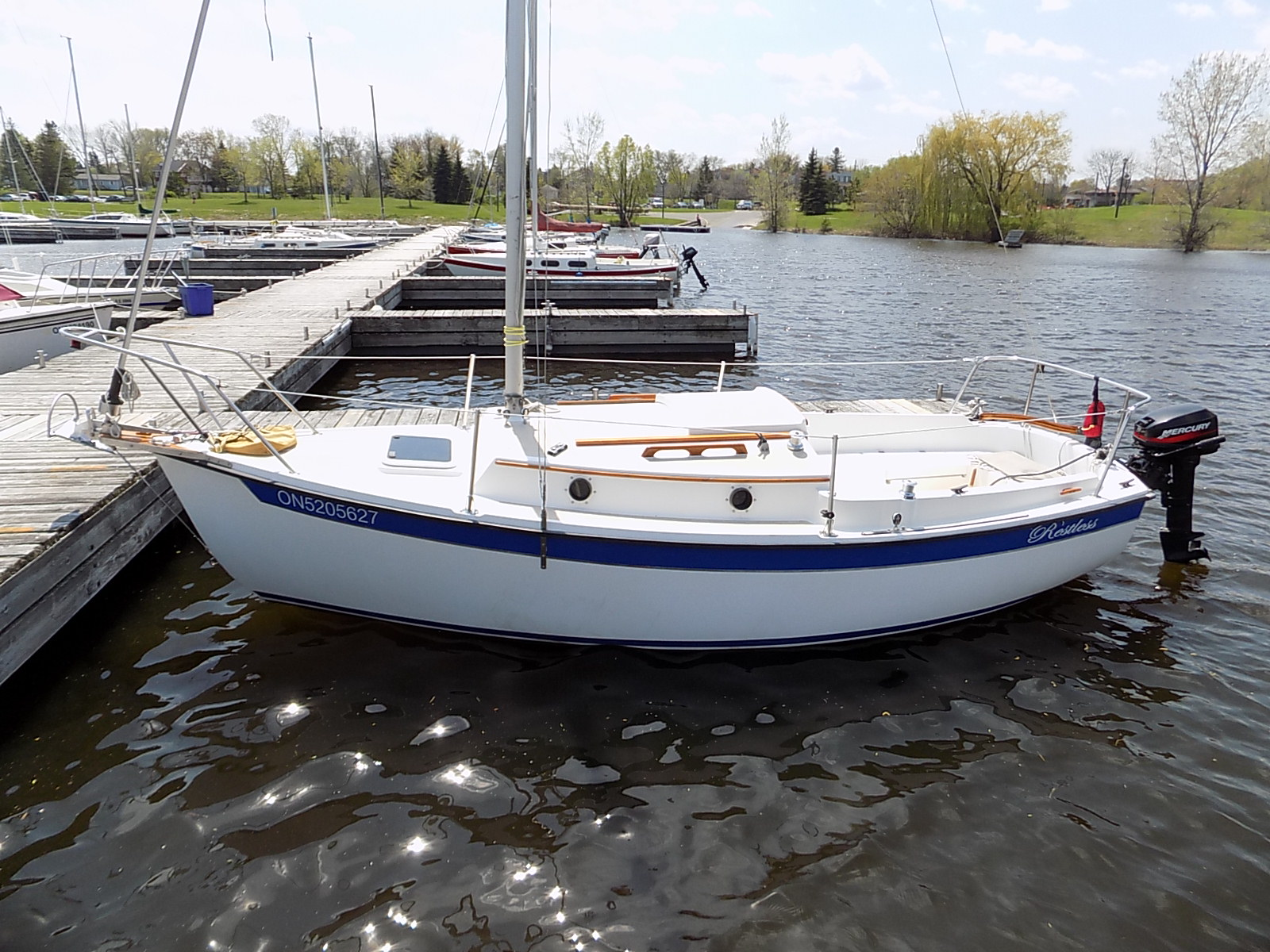
Com-Pac 19 Mk 2

The Com-Pac 19 is a small recreational keelboat, built predominantly of fiberglass, with wood trim. It has a masthead sloop rig, a transom-hung rudder and a fixed long keel. It displaces 2,000 lb (907 kg) and carries 800 lb (363 kg) of ballast.

The boat has a draft of 2.00 ft (0.61 m) with the standard keel fitted. The design is normally fitted with a small 3 to 6 hp (2 to 4 kW) outboard motor for docking and maneuvering. There is a cockpit storage compartment for the outboard's fuel tank.

Accommodations include berths for four people and an optional head located at the bottom of the companionway and a galley located in the notch at the base of the V-berth. Cabin headroom is 46 in (120 cm). Optional equipment includes jibsheet and halyard winches, tracks for the genoa and a pulpit.

The design has a PHRF racing average handicap of 285 and a hull speed of 5.41 kn (10.02 km/h).

== Variants ==
Com-Pac 19
This model was introduced in 1979. It has a length overall of 19.00 ft (5.8 m), a waterline length of 16.33 ft (5.0 m).
Com-Pac 19 Mk 2
This model was introduced in 1979 and differs from the original model by the addition of a bowsprit that moves the forestay forward. It has a length overall of 20.08 ft (6.1 m), a waterline length of 16.33 ft (5.0 m).

== Operational history ==
In a 2010 review Steve Henkel wrote, "this design, originally drawn by Island Packet builder/designer Bob Johnson, was gradually changed over her more than 20-year life, but the basics remained the same. Like her little sister, the Com-Pac 16, she was designed to provide easy handling for novice sailors. Best features: Very simple rig and fittings, suitable for first-time sailors. Deep cockpit gives feeling of security. Worst features: The long keel tends to keep her sailing straight ahead, a plus when cruising in gusty weather but a minus when you want to make a quick turn. New price was a bit above most of her comp[etitors]s, and her Space Index is lowest. The keel is not deep enough for efficient upwind sailing, All comp[etitors]s have only sitting headroom, but the Com-Pac has the least of the bunch. A portable galley was available as an option ... though in the latest model the galley was moved forward and enlarged to include sink (with a small water supply) and ice chest. Otherwise, there's not much below."

== See also ==
- List of sailing boat types

Similar sailboats

- Cornish Shrimper 19
- Mariner 19
- Mercury 18
- Nordica 16
- Sanibel 18
- West Wight Potter 19
