= Com-Pac Yachts =

Sailboat manufacturer

Com-Pac Yachts/Hutchins Co., Inc.
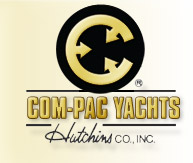
- Company type: Privately held company
- Industry: Boat building
- Founded: 1972
- Founder: W.L. Hutchins Sr.
- Headquarters: Clearwater, Florida, United States
- Key people: Gerry and Richard Hutchins
- Products: Sailboats
- Website: www.com-pacyachts.com

Com-Pac Yachts is an American brand of sailboats, made by the Hutchins Co., Inc., a boat builder based in Clearwater, Florida. The company specialized in the design and manufacture of fiberglass sailboats. Over time the brand and the company have become synonymous.

The company was founded by W.L. "Les" Hutchins Sr. in 1957 and started building sailboats in 1970. The company ceased its operations in 2025

== History ==
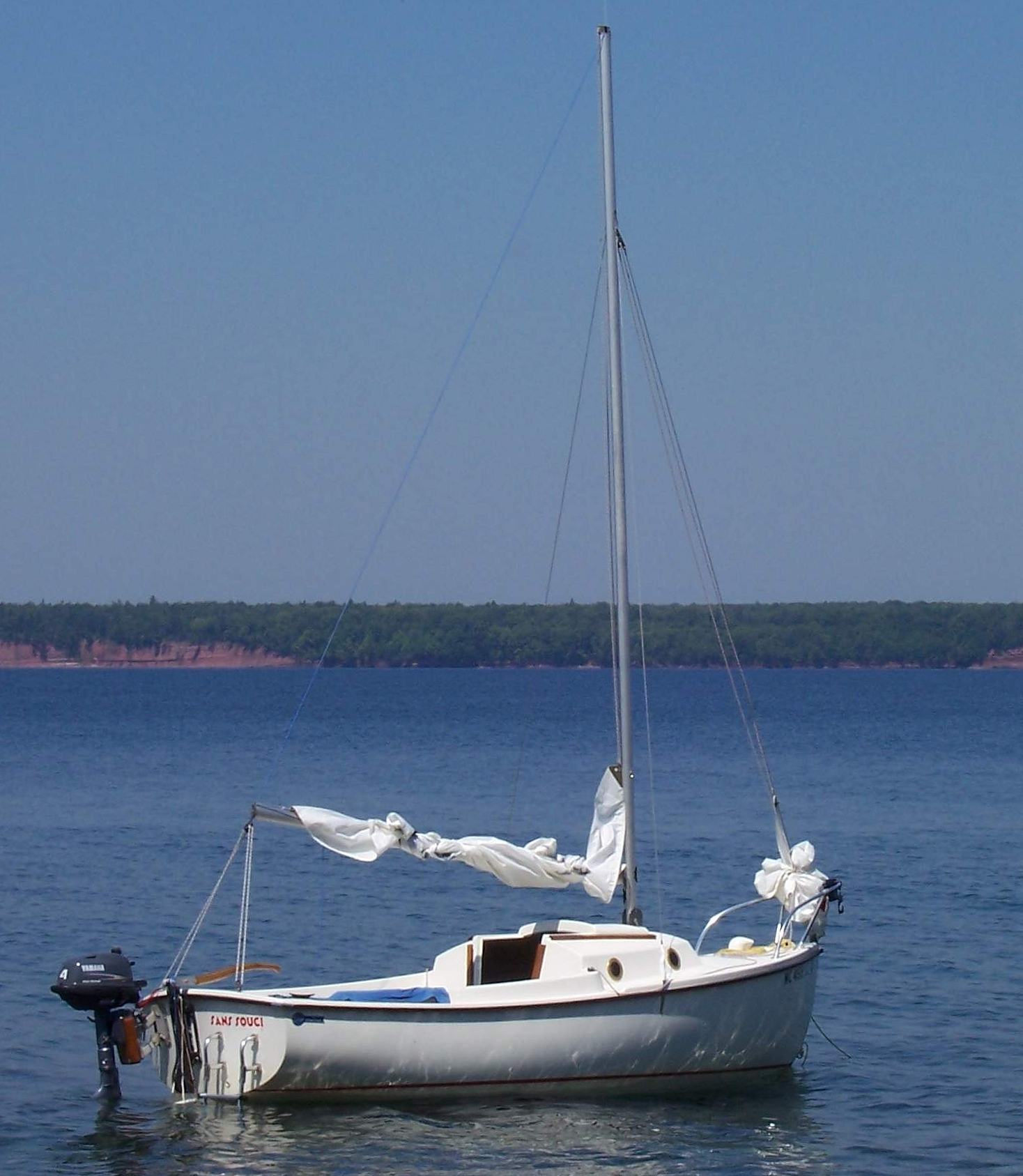
Com-Pac 16

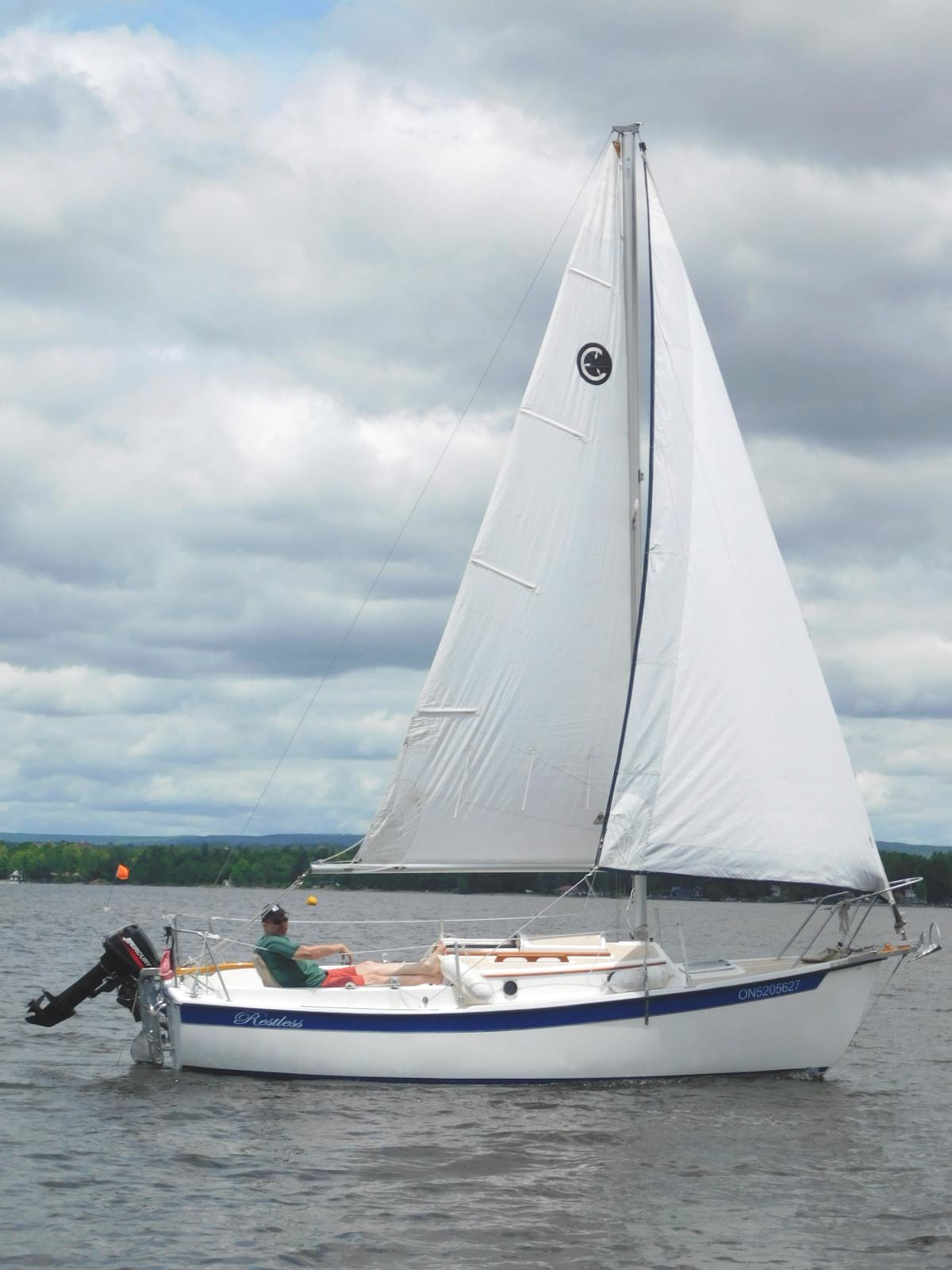
Com-Pac 19

Les Hutchins had started as a farmer and trained tool and die maker, but became an inventor, designing many automotive accessories and parts and even a folding high chair. He established his first company in St. Louis, Missouri, doing metal-stamping and fabrication work, making parts of the automotive industry under subcontract. Hutchins ended up owning a number of patents and registered trademarks.

In an attempt to diversify his company's interests and also to move into a field he personally enjoyed, Hutchins decided to enter boat building in 1970. Focusing on the smaller end of the boat market, Hutchins's goal was "to build a small but highly efficient sailboat that would appeal to people who didn't want to invest too heavily in a boat, yet one they could easily trailer behind a compact car." His intended customer was retirees moving to Florida, who would want a small, inexpensive boat that could be kept at home in a garage on a boat trailer.

The first design produced was the Clark Mills designed Com-Pac 16 in 1972, followed by another Clark Mills design, the Com-Pac 23 in 1978. The Com-Pac 16 was originally marketed as "The Com-Pac Yacht", but was later given its length designation to differentiate it from the rest of the product line. The boat building enterprise became Com-Pac Yachts.

The Com-Pac 19 was designed by Bob Johnson of Island Packet Yachts in 1979. The largest boat built by the company was the Com-Pac 35, a 1990 Charley Morgan design. In 1999 the company started making small catboats and discovered an untapped market. The newer designs incorporate stainless steel centerboards and use a unique mast, sail and boom folding system that allows quick transition from the road transport trailer to the water and back again.

The company has its fiberglass hulls and its spars both built by subcontractors.

When Les Hutchins retired, his sons, Gerry and Richard Hutchins took over the company. The company remained a small-scale producer, building only a few hundred boats a year.

By 2021 the company was producing 12 designs. There were 11 sailboats: the Com-Pac Picnic Cat, Com-Pac Sun Cat, Com-Pac Sunday Cat, Sun Cat Daysailer, Com-Pac Horizon Cat, Com-Pac Horizon Day Cat, Com-Pac Legacy, Com-Pac Legacy Sport, Com-Pac Eclipse, CP 23 Pilothouse, Com-Pac 23/IV and the Com-Pac 27/3. They also produced one powerboat, the Com-Pac Launch.

In a company profile for Small Craft Advisor magazine, writer Dennis Boese described the company, "Com-Pac Yachts has endured and prospered through lean and boom times of the sailboat-building industry. The Hutchins Company's unique ability to meld classic design and high quality with new and innovative technology virtually assures its continued success."

The company website published the following news in 2025: "After much consideration, we have made the difficult decision to cease operations effective May 1, 2025, due to the passing of Gerry Hutchins and the well-deserved retirement of Richard Hutchins".

== Boats ==
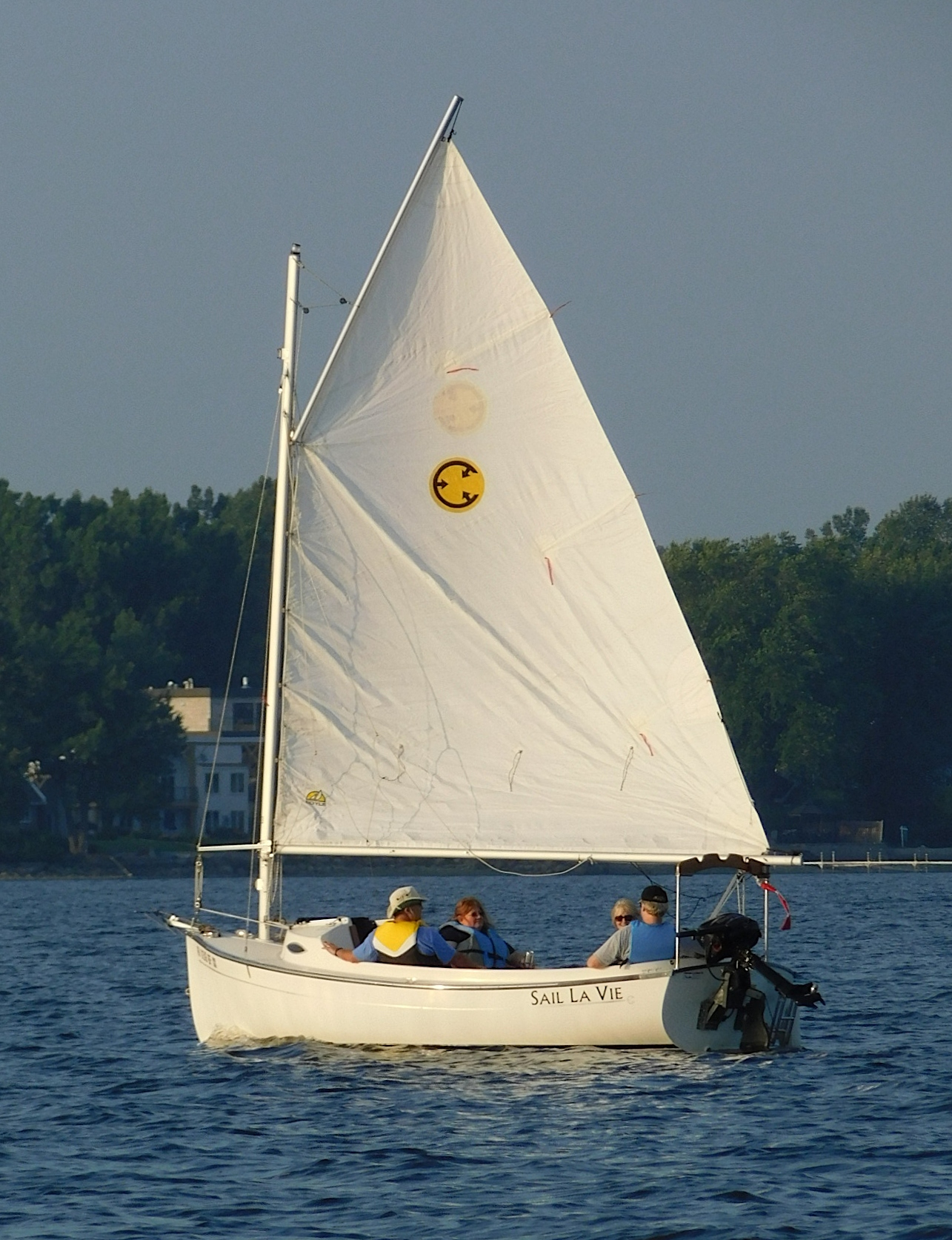
Com-Pac Sunday Cat

Summary of boats built by Com-Pac Yachts:

- Com-Pac 16 - 1972
- Com-Pac 16 Mark 2 - 1975
- Com-Pac 23 - 1978
- Com-Pac 23 Mark 2 - 1979
- Com-Pac 19 - 1979
- Com-Pac 19 Mark 2 - 1979
- Com-Pac 25 - 1979
- Com-Pac 23 Mark 3 - 1984
- Com-Pac 27/2 - 1988
- Com-Pac 35 - 1990
- C-Cat 3014 - 1992
- Com-Pac Picnic Cat - 1998
- Com-Pac 33 - 1999
- Com-Pac Sun Cat - 2000
- Com-Pac Horizon Cat 20 - 2002
- Com-Pac Horizon Day Cat 20 - 2003
- Com-Pac Eclipse - 2004
- Com-Pac Legacy - 2006
- Com-Pac Sunday Cat - 2008
- Com-Pac 23 Pilothouse - 2011

== See also ==
- List of sailboat designers and manufacturers
