= Com-Pac Sunday Cat =

Sailboat class

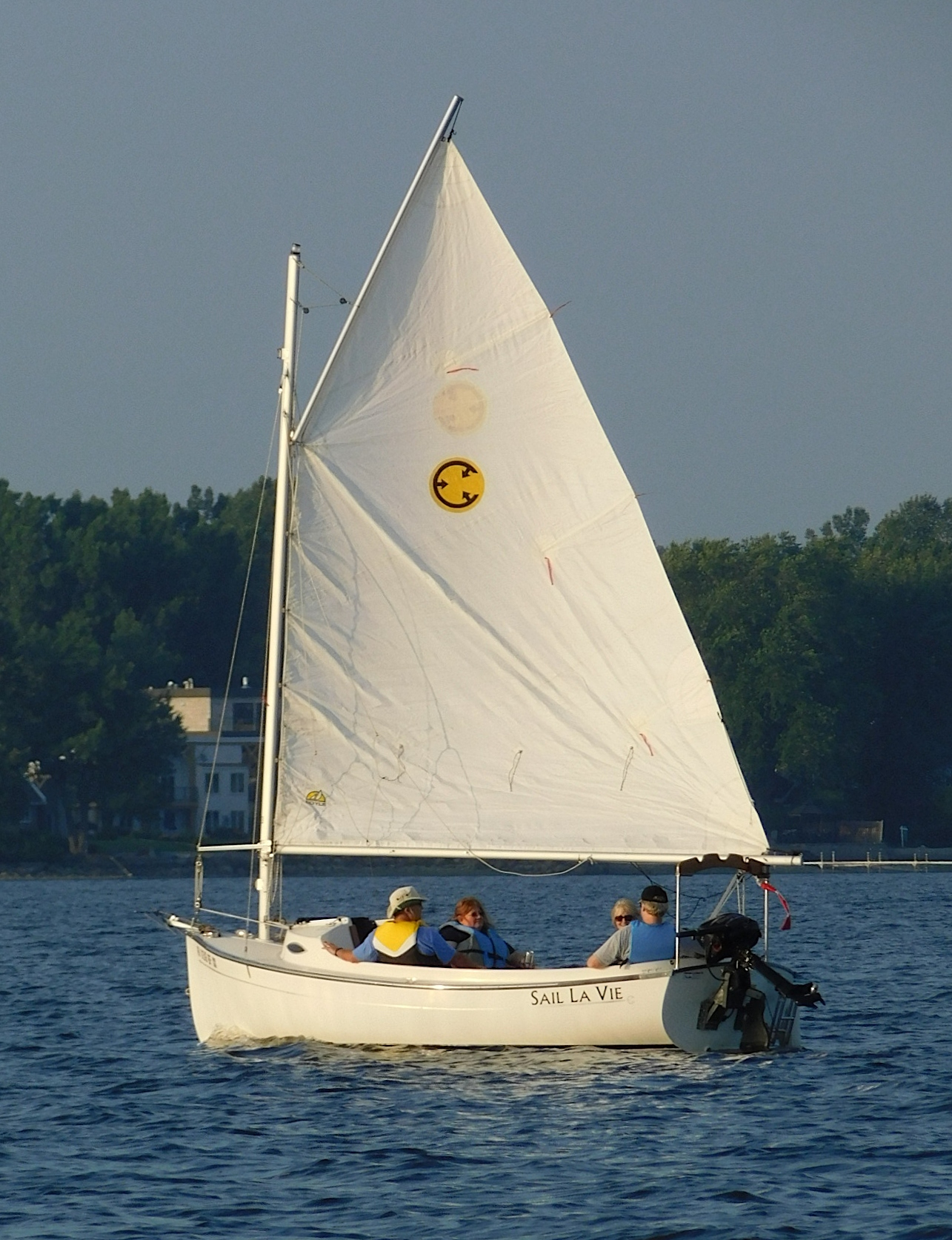

Development
- Designer: Clark Mills
- Location: United States
- Year: 2008
- Builder: Com-Pac Yachts
- Role: day sailer
- Name: Com-Pac Sunday Cat

Boat
- Displacement: 1,500 lb (680 kg)
- Draft: 4.5 ft (1.4 m)

Hull
- Type: Monohull
- Construction: Fiberglass
- LOA: 17.33 ft (5.28 m)
- LWL: 15.00 ft (4.57 m)
- Beam: 7.40 ft (2.26 m)
- Engine: Outboard motor

Hull appendages
- Keel: centerboard
- Ballast: 300 lb (136 kg)
- Rudder: transom-mounted rudder

Rig
- Rig type: Catboat

Sails
- Sailplan: Cat rig
- Mainsail area: 150 sq ft (14 m^{2})
- Total sail area: 150 sq ft (14 m^{2})

The Com-Pac Sunday Cat is an American trailerable sailboat that was designed by Clark Mills, who had previously designed the Optimist.

The Sunday Cat is a development of the Com-Pac Sun Cat. The Sun Cat comes in both cabin and open day sailer models. The Sunday Cat retains the large cockpit of the day sailer, but employs a small cuddy cabin that can accommodate a portable head.

== Production ==
The design has been built by Com-Pac Yachts in the United States starting in about 2008 and remained in production in 2019.

== Design ==
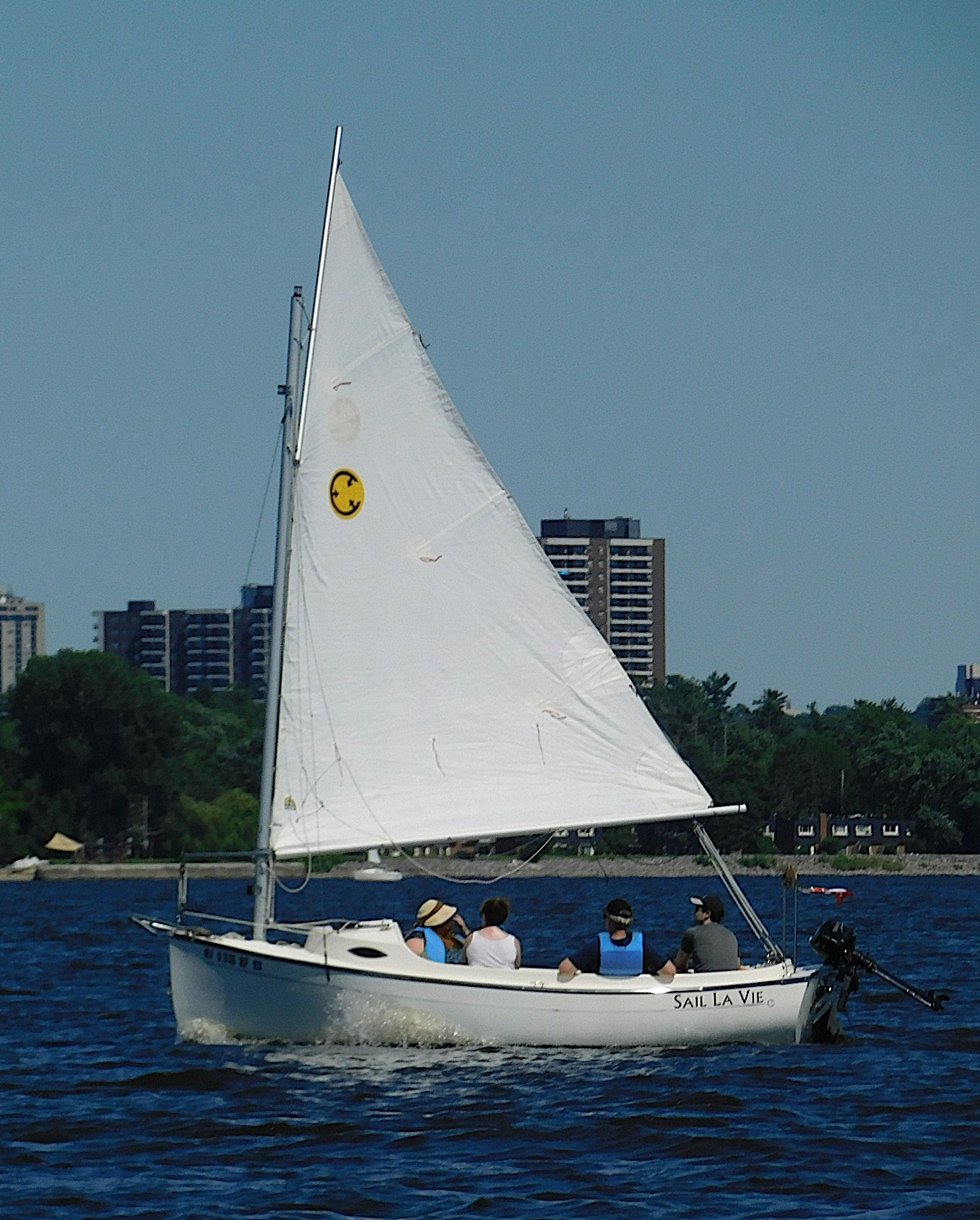
Com-Pac Sunday Cat

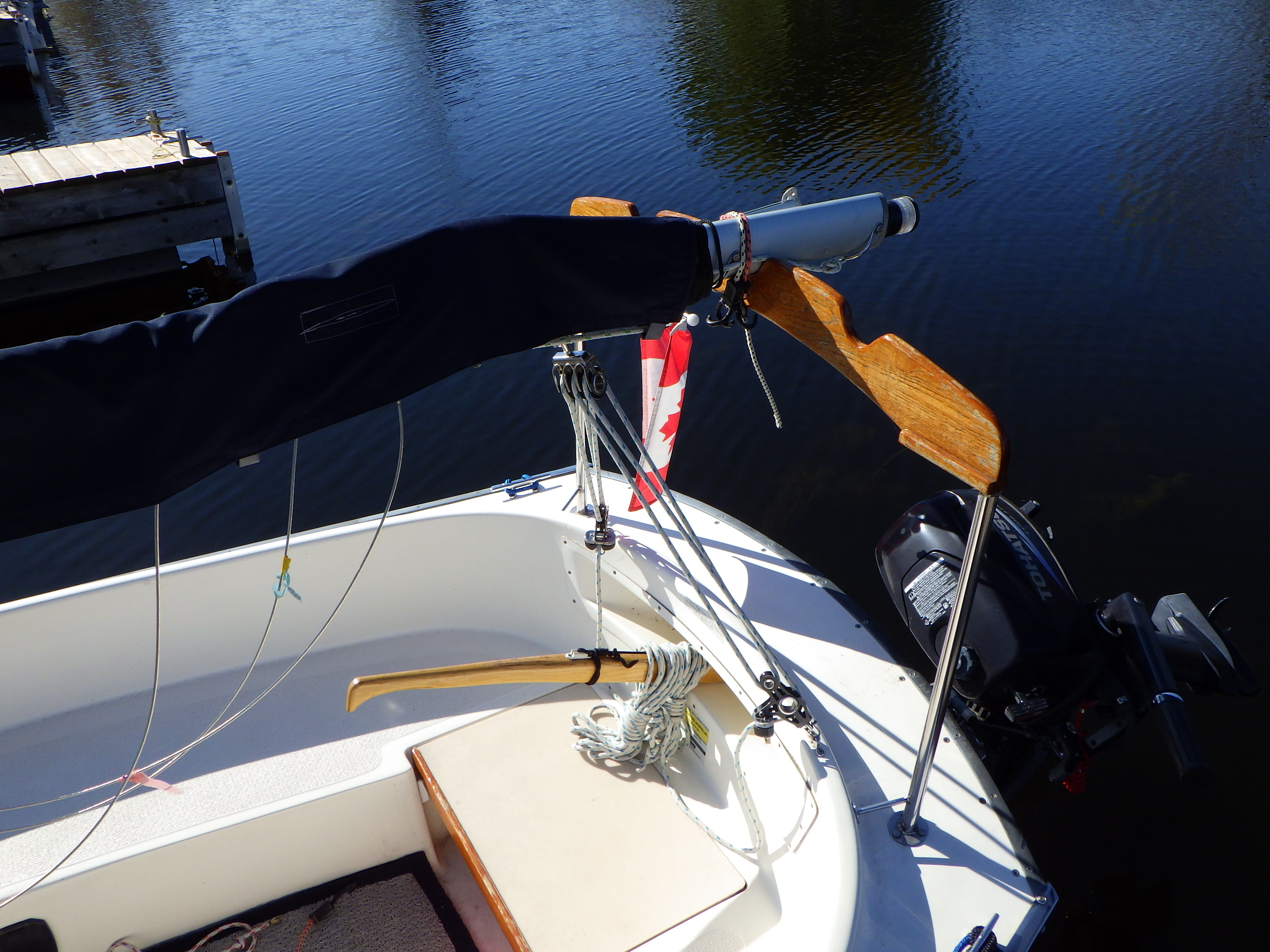
Com-Pac Sunday Cat boom gallows

The Sunday Cat is a recreational keelboat, built predominantly of fiberglass. It has a cat rig with a single gaff-rigged sail, a plumb stem, a nearly vertical transom, a transom-hung rudder controlled by a wooden tiller and a stub keel, with a retractable stainless steel 80 lb (36 kg) centerboard. It displaces 1,500 lb (680 kg) and carries 300 lb (136 kg) of fixed ballast.

The boat has a draft of 4.5 ft (1.4 m) with the centreboard extended and 1.17 ft (0.36 m) with it retracted, allowing beaching or ground transportation on a trailer.

The boat is normally fitted with a small outboard motor for docking and maneuvering. The cuddy cabin has two small portlights.

The mast, boom and gaff are designed for quick raising and lowering, while on the trailer or while afloat. All spars remain attached and lower onto a transom-mounted boom gallows. The mast has a steel hinge, secured by a pin.

== See also ==
- List of sailing boat types

Similar sailboats

- Buccaneer 200
- Drascombe Lugger
- Drascombe Scaffie
- Edel 540
- Mercury 18
- Mistral T-21
- Naiad 18
- Sandpiper 565
- Sanibel 17
- Siren 17
