= Dilks Sun Cat =

American trailerable sailboat

Sun Cat
Development
- Designer: Clark Mills
- Year: 1960
- Builders: Dilks & Company, Clearwater Bay Marine Ways Inc.
- Name: Sun Cat

Boat
- Displacement: 1,200 lb (540 kg)
- Draft: 2.58 ft (0.79 m) with bilgeboards down 0.75 ft (0.23 m) with bilgeboards up

Hull
- Type: monohull
- LOA: 16.5 ft (5.0 m)
- LWL: 15 ft (4.6 m)
- Beam: 7.25 ft (2.21 m)

Hull appendages
- Keel: bilgeboard, centerboard, fixed keel
- Rudder: transom-mounted rudder

Rig
- Rig type: Bermuda rig

Sails
- Sailplan: Catboat
- Mainsail area: 165 sq ft (15.3 m^{2})

The Sun Cat, now referred to as the Sun Cat 17-1 or the Dilks Sun Cat, is an American trailerable sailboat that was designed by Clark Mills in 1960 as a daysailer.

Sun Cats, in their original form, can be distinguished from the Com-Pac Sun Cat by looking for a Bermuda rig rather than a Gaff rig as well as a Sail emblem of a sun with a C in the center.

Sun Cat Hull #1, a strip-planked centerboard daysailer that Clark Mills built for himself, is on display alongside some of his other designs in the Mckay Creek Boat Shop in Heritage Village, located in Largo, Florida.

== Production ==
Dilks & Company built Sun Cats in Clarksville, Arkansas.

Clark Mills built Sun Cats as Clearwater Bay Marine Ways Inc. in Clearwater, Florida.

The Sun Cat was later developed into the Com-Pac Sun Cat in 2000.

== Versions ==
Sun Cats were built as open daysailers as well as pocket cruisers with a cabin.

=== Open Daysailer ===
The open daysailer Sun Cats had many unique features, such as a roller reefing boom, bilgeboards, and an optional removable cuddy cabin. These boats had an 11' long self-bailing cockpit and could be purchased from Dilks and Company either as a kit or a complete boat.

=== Pocket Cruiser ===
Sun Cats with enclosed cabins were either built with a centerboard or a keel.
