= Clark Mills =

Clark Mills may refer to:

- Clark Mills, New York
- Clark Mills (sculptor) (1810–1883), American sculptor
- Clark Mills (boatbuilder) (1915–2001), American designer and builder of boats
