= Shrimper =

Shrimper may refer to:

- A person engaged in the shrimp fishery
- Cornish Shrimper 19, a British sailboat design
- The Shrimpers, nickname for Southend United F.C.
