= Com-Pac Sun Cat =

Sailboat class

Development
- Designer: Clark Mills
- Location: United States
- Year: 2000
- Builder: Com-Pac Yachts
- Role: Cruiser
- Name: Com-Pac Sun Cat

Boat
- Displacement: 1,500 lb (680 kg)
- Draft: 4.50 ft (1.37 m) with centerboard down

Hull
- Type: monohull
- Construction: fiberglass
- LOA: 17.33 ft (5.28 m)
- LWL: 15.00 ft (4.57 m)
- Beam: 7.25 ft (2.21 m)
- Engine: outboard motor

Hull appendages
- Keel: stub keel and centerboard
- Ballast: 200 lb (91 kg)
- Rudder: transom-mounted rudder

Rig
- Rig type: Gaff rig

Sails
- Sailplan: Catboat
- Mainsail area: 150.00 sq ft (13.935 m^{2})
- Total sail area: 150.00 sq ft (13.935 m^{2})

The Com-Pac Sun Cat, also called the Com-Pac Sun Cat 17, is an American trailerable sailboat that was designed by Clark Mills as a pocket cruiser and first built in 2000.

The boat is a derivative of the earlier, 1972, smaller and lighter Dilks Sun Cat Mills drew for Dilks & Company.

The Com-Pac Sun Cat design was developed into the Com-Pac Sunday Cat daysailer in 2008. The Sunday Cat trades a smaller cabin for a larger cockpit.

== Production ==
The design has been built by Com-Pac Yachts in the United States since 2000 and remains in production.

== Design ==
The manufacturer describes the design's goals as easy to rig, sail and transport on a trailer for use as a daysailer and overnight cruiser in shoal waters and coves.

The Com-Pac Sun Cat is a recreational keelboat, built predominantly of fiberglass, with wood trim. It is a gaff rigged catboat, with a plumb stem, an angled transom, a transom-hung rudder controlled by a tiller and a fixed stub keel with a stainless steel centerboard. It displaces 1,500 lb (680 kg) and carries 200 lb (91 kg) of ballast.

The boat has a draft of 4.50 ft (1.37 m) with the centerboard extended and 1.16 ft (0.35 m) with it retracted, allowing operation in shallow water and ground transportation on a trailer. The design is equipped with a transom-mounted boom gallows on which the mast, boom and gaff may be stowed during ground transport.

The boat is normally fitted with a small 3 to 6 hp (2 to 4 kW) outboard motor for docking and maneuvering, mounted on a bracket on the port side of the transom.

The design has sleeping accommodation for two people, with two straight settees in the main cabin. Cabin headroom is 38 in (97 cm). There is an anchor locker on the bow.

The boat has a hull speed of 5.2 kn (9.6 km/h).

== Operational history ==
In a 2010 review Steve Henkel wrote, "best features: The Hutchins Company generally does a good job on finishing their boats, even the small ones. The Sun Cat's hull is configured to make trailering and handling at a ramp easy; short spars make striking her rig easier, and give good clearance under low bridges ... Worst features: Low SA/D restricts performance under sail. Space below is limited by her relatively narrow beam, low cabin height, and short waterline length. Her stern is narrow compared with her comps, making it likely that she will sail somewhat down by the stern with more than a pair of light-weight people sitting at the forward end of the cockpit. Her melon-seed hull shape and low ballast tend to limit her use to the light-air end of weather conditions."

A 2010 review in Tropical Boating noted that the design is "a delight from beginning to end." The review concluded, "the Sun Cat is a great choice for anyone who wants a small sailboat that is both comfortable and easy to sail, and it also has enough responsiveness and trim adjustments to please and challenge even very experienced sailors."

== See also ==
- List of sailing boat types

Related development

- Com-Pac Sunday Cat
