= Com-Pac 23 =

Sailboat class

Development
- Designer: Clark Mills
- Location: United States
- Year: 1978
- Builder: Com-Pac Yachts
- Role: Cruiser
- Name: Com-Pac 23

Boat
- Displacement: 2,900 lb (1,315 kg)
- Draft: 2.25 ft (0.69 m)

Hull
- Type: monohull
- Construction: fiberglass
- LOA: 22.75 ft (6.93 m)
- LWL: 20.17 ft (6.15 m)
- Beam: 7.83 ft (2.39 m)
- Engine: outboard motor

Hull appendages
- Keel: fin keel
- Ballast: 1,340 lb (608 kg)
- Rudder: transom-mounted rudder

Rig
- Rig type: Bermuda rig
- I foretriangle height: 26.00 ft (7.92 m)
- J foretriangle base: 8.42 ft (2.57 m)
- P mainsail luff: 22.75 ft (6.93 m)
- E mainsail foot: 8.50 ft (2.59 m)

Sails
- Sailplan: masthead sloop
- Mainsail area: 96.69 sq ft (8.983 m^{2})
- Jib/genoa area: 109.46 sq ft (10.169 m^{2})
- Total sail area: 206.15 sq ft (19.152 m^{2})

Racing
- PHRF: 260

The Com-Pac 23 is an American trailerable sailboat that was designed by Clark Mills as a pocket cruiser and first built in 1978. The boat has undergone design changes over time resulting in a series of improved models.

== Production ==
The design has been built by Com-Pac Yachts in the United States since 1978 and remains in production as the Mark IV and Pilothouse models.

== Design ==
The Com-Pac 23 is a recreational keelboat, built predominantly of fiberglass, with wood trim. It has a masthead sloop rig, a spooned plumb stem, a plumb transom, a transom-hung rudder controlled by a tiller and a fixed fin, shoal draft keel.

The boat has a draft of 2.25 ft (0.69 m) with the standard shoal draft keel.

The boat is normally fitted with a small 3 to 9 hp (2 to 7 kW) outboard motor for docking and maneuvering.

The design has sleeping accommodation for four people, with a double "V"-berth in the bow cabin and two straight settee quarter berths in the main cabin. The galley is located aft of the companionway ladder and is equipped with a two-burner stove and a sink. The head is a portable type and is located in the bow cabin between the bunks. Cabin headroom is 52 in (130 cm).

The design has a PHRF racing average handicap of 260 and a hull speed of 6.0 kn (11.1 km/h).

== Variants ==
Com-Pac 23
This model was introduced in 1978. It has a length overall of 22.75 ft (6.9 m), a waterline length of 20.17 ft (6.1 m), displaces 2,900 lb (1,315 kg) and carries 1,340 lb (608 kg) of ballast. The fresh water tank has a capacity of 5 U.S. gallons (19 L; 4.2 imp gal).
Com-Pac 23 Mk 2
This model was introduced in 1979. It has a length overall of 23.92 ft (7.3 m), a waterline length of 20.17 ft (6.1 m), displaces 3,000 lb (1,361 kg) and carries 1,340 lb (608 kg) of ballast. The fresh water tank has a capacity of 14 U.S. gallons (53 L; 12 imp gal).
Com-Pac 23 Mk 3
This model introduced in 1984 and carries a bowsprit. It has a length overall of 23.92 ft (7.3 m), a waterline length of 20.25 ft (6.2 m), displaces 3,000 lb (1,361 kg) and carries 1,340 lb (608 kg) of ballast. A Japanese Yanmar diesel engine of 9 hp (7 kW) was a factory option.
Com-Pac 23 Mk 4 or 23/IV
This current productionmodel has a length overall of 23.92 ft (7.3 m), a beam of 8.0 ft (2.4 m) and displaces 3,000 lb (1,361 kg). The keel and rudder both use a NACA airfoil low drag-high lift design.
Com-Pac 23 Pilothouse
This model was introduced in 2011 and features a pilothouse from which the boat can be steered by a wheel in inclement weather. It has a length overall of 23.92 ft (7.3 m), a waterline length of 20.16 ft (6.1 m), displaces 3,500 lb (1,588 kg) and carries 1,340 lb (608 kg) of ballast.

== Operational history ==
In a 2008 review in Sailing Magazine, John Kretschmer wrote, "although the Com-Pac 23 is a very practical boat, its wide appeal comes from its traditional appearance. The sheerline sweeps aft from the short bowsprit before bending up again just before the transom-hung rudder. The box cabintrunk, with round or oval bronze ports, flows naturally into the deck lines. From a distance the boat looks bigger than 23 feet. There is a shallow forefoot and a long, shoal keel with a draft of just 2 feet, 3 inches. Any more draft would make it difficult to launch on many ramps."

In a 2010 review Steve Henkel wrote, "the Com-Pac 23 ... is now in its fourth iteration (called Mk IV). Along the way various changes have included a bowsprit which moved the sail area center of effort forward, reducing weather helm), a small increase in ballast weight, an on-deck anchor locker, improvements in hardware including a switch from round ports to rectangular ones, a PVC rubrail with stainless steel striker plate, a foil rudder blade in place of one made of flat plate, an optional 9 hp Yanmar inboard diesel engine, and others. (The company included the new bowsprit in the boat’s length, changing it from 22' 9" to 23' 11"; we use LOD, not LOA, as a measure of length, so we exclude the bowsprit.) Best features: The finish is above average, with lots of teak below and a teak-and-holly sole, Worst features: The draft of the Com-Pac 23 at only 2' 3", with no centerboard, limits the boat's ability to sail close to the wind."

In a 2012 boats.com review of the Pilothouse model, Zuzana Prochazka wrote, "'cute as a button' is one way to describe Com-Pac Yachts’ 23-foot pilothouse sloop, but the emphasis on the diminutive is misleading because the CP 23 PH is much more than just loveable and small. It’s actually an innovative and serious trailerable cruiser, enhancing Com-Pac’s reputation for building tough boats with well-thought-out details."

== See also ==
- List of sailing boat types
