= Windmill (sailing dinghy) =

Sailboat class

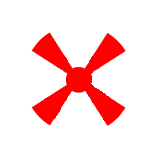
- Class symbol

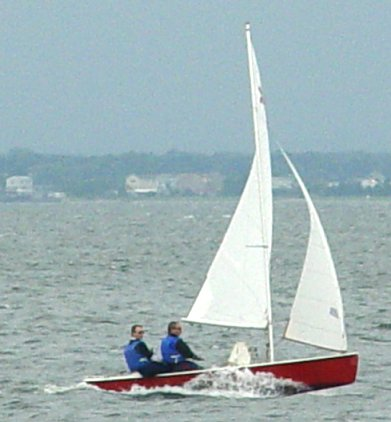

Development
- Designer: Clark Mills
- Location: United States
- Year: 1953
- No. built: 5700
- Builders: Johannsen Boat Works; Lockley Newport Boats; Advance Sailboat Corp.
- Role: One-design racer
- Name: Windmill

Boat
- Displacement: 198 lb (90 kg)
- Draft: 4.17 ft (1.27 m) with the "longboard-style" daggerboard down

Hull
- Type: Monohull
- Construction: Fiberglass or plywood
- LOA: 15.50 ft (4.72 m)
- LWL: 14.50 ft (4.42 m)
- Beam: 4.75 ft (1.45 m)

Hull appendages
- Keel: daggerboard
- Rudder: transom-mounted rudder

Rig
- Rig type: Bermuda rig

Sails
- Sailplan: Fractional rigged sloop Masthead sloop
- Mainsail area: 85 sq ft (7.9 m^{2})
- Jib/genoa area: 34 sq ft (3.2 m^{2})
- Spinnaker area: none
- Total sail area: 119 sq ft (11.1 m^{2})

Racing
- D-PN: 90.2

The Windmill is an American sailing dinghy that was designed by Clark Mills as a one-design racer and first built in 1953.

The Windmill hull design was developed into the US1 single-handed catboat in 1974.

== Production ==
Originally intended to be amateur-constructed from four sheets of plywood, the boat was also commercially manufactured from fiberglass. The design was built by Johannsen Boat Works, Lockley Newport Boats and Advance Sailboat Corp. in the United States, but it is now out of production. A total of 5700 examples of the type have been completed.

== Design ==
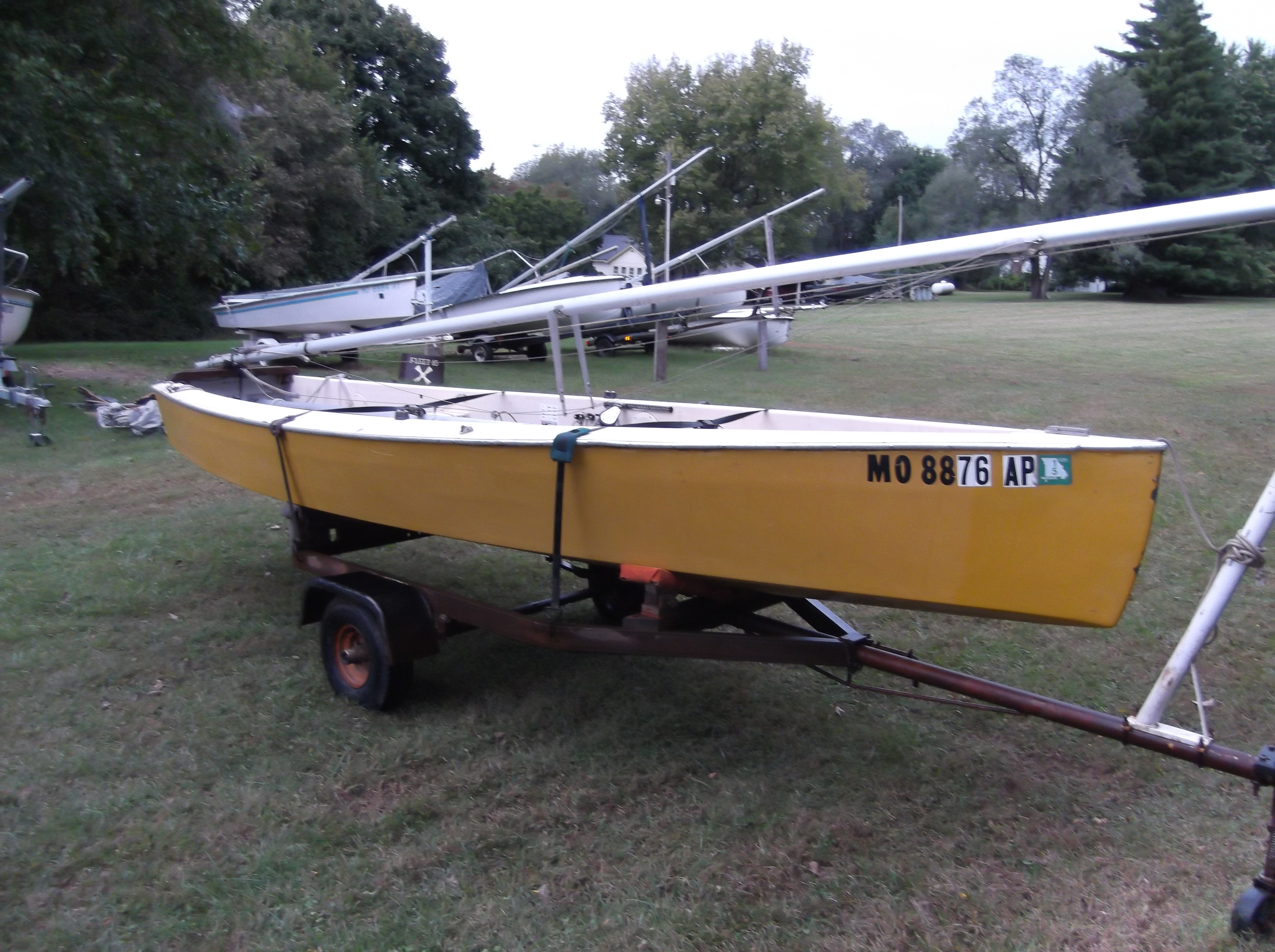
Windmill on a trailer, showing hull shape

The Windmill is a recreational sailboat, built predominantly of plywood or fiberglass in the form of a double hull with a foam core, resulting in an unsinkable boat. It has a fractional sloop rig with aluminum spars. The boat and is sailed only with a jib and mainsail, no spinnaker and no trapeze. The hull has a rounded plumb stem, a conventional transom, a transom-hung rudder controlled by a tiller and a retractable daggerboard. It displaces 198 lb (90 kg),

The boat has a draft of 4.17 ft (1.27 m) with the daggerboard extended and 6 in (15 cm) with it retracted, allowing beaching or ground transportation on a trailer or car roof rack.

For sailing the design is equipped with jib and mainsail windows for visibility. It also has an internal 2:1 mechanical advantage outhaul, a 4:1 boom vang controlled by the boat's skipper and a 4:1 Cunningham. The boat has adjustable jib fairleads and a mainsheet traveler, plus an Elvstrom bailer.

The design has a Portsmouth Yardstick racing average handicap of 90.2 and is normally raced with a crew of two sailors.

== Operational history ==
In a 1994 review Richard Sherwood wrote, "the Windmill is a high-performance sloop that can be built from plans or from a kit, or purchased complete. She is very light and planes quickly. Class rules are strict, and neither spinnakers nor trapezes are allowed. With a double hull and closed-cell foam, the boat is unsinkable. This type of construction also results in a very rigid boat."

The boat is supported by an active class club, the Windmill Class Association.

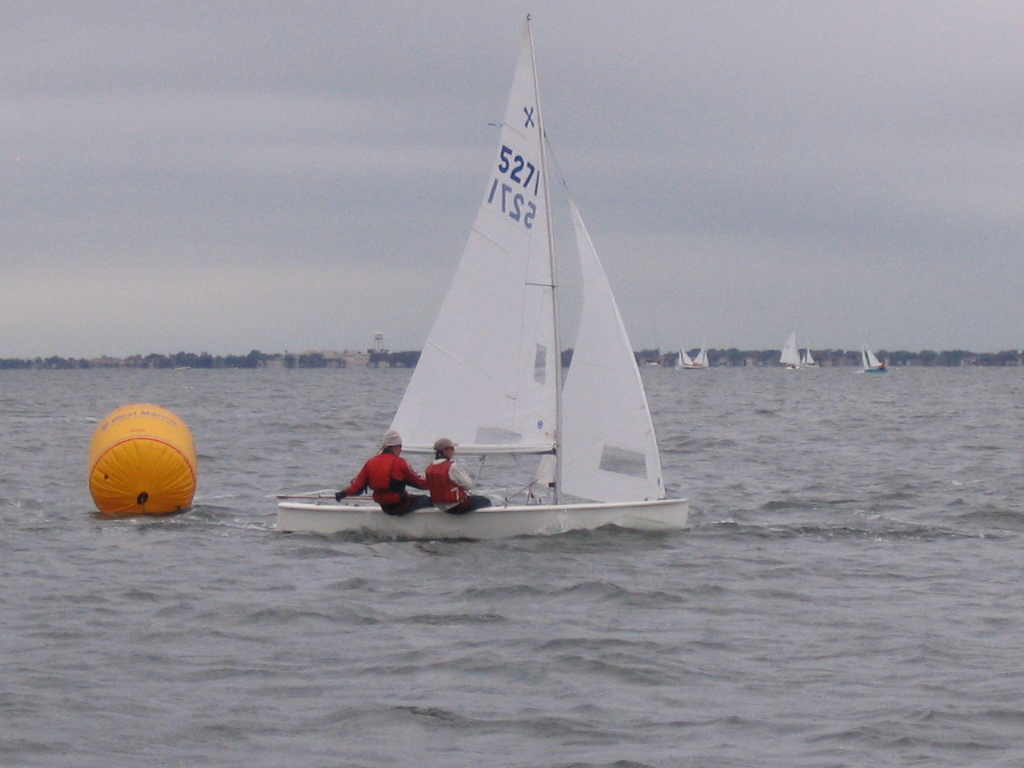
Windmill racing by a mark

== See also ==
- List of sailing boat types

Related development

- US1
