= US1 =

Sailboat class

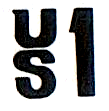
- Class symbol

Development
- Designer: Ralph Kuppersmith and Clark Mills
- Location: United States
- Year: 1973
- No. built: 450
- Builders: Advance Sailboat Corp. Continental Sailcraft
- Role: One-design racer
- Name: US1

Boat
- Displacement: 190 lb (86 kg)
- Draft: 2.50 ft (0.76 m) with the centerboard down

Hull
- Type: Monohull
- Construction: Fiberglass
- LOA: 15.42 ft (4.70 m)
- LWL: 13.50 ft (4.11 m)
- Beam: 4.58 ft (1.40 m)

Hull appendages
- Keel: centerboard
- Rudder: transom-mounted rudder

Rig
- Rig type: Cat rig

Sails
- Sailplan: Catboat
- Mainsail area: 90.00 sq ft (8.361 m^{2})
- Total sail area: 90.00 sq ft (8.361 m^{2})

Racing
- D-PN: 91.5

The US1, sometimes written US 1, is an American sailing dinghy that was designed by Ralph Kuppersmith and Clark Mills as a one-design racer and first built in 1973.

The design is most likely a catboat-rigged derivation of the Mills-designed Windmill of 1953.

== Production ==
The design was initially built by Kuppersmith's company, the Advance Sailboat Corporation of Parkville, Missouri and later of Independence, Missouri, United States. That company went out of business in 1980 and the boat design was then built by Continental Sailcraft. A total of 450 boats were completed, but it is now out of production.

== Design ==
The US1 is a recreational sailboat, built predominantly of fiberglass. It has a catboat rig with a loose-footed mainsail and foam-filled aluminum spars to reduce the risk of turtling. The hull features a rounded foredeck, a plumb stem, a vertical transom, a transom-hung, kick-up rudder controlled by a tiller and a retractable centerboard. It displaces 190 lb (86 kg).

The boat has a draft of 2.50 ft (0.76 m) with the centerboard extended and 7 in (18 cm) with it retracted, allowing beaching or ground transportation on a trailer or car roof rack.

For sailing the design is equipped with a dual Cunningham and an outhaul.

The class rules allow specific modifications to the boat, including the installation of two bailers, centerboard gaskets, four inspection ports, changes to the sheeting, the boom vang, the Cunningham, mainsheet traveler, outhaul, as well as the rudder and tiller and the centerboard control lines.

At one time the class rules allowed the use of a three-piece mast as an alternative to the standard two-piece mast, but this change was repealed.

The design has a Portsmouth Yardstick racing average handicap of 91.5 and is normally raced with a crew of one or two sailors, who are limited by the class rules to 270 lb (122 kg) total weight.

== Operational history ==
In 1994 there were active fleets racing in Missouri, Ohio, Pennsylvania and Texas.

== See also ==
- List of sailing boat types
