= Com-Pac Eclipse =

Sailboat class

Development
- Designer: Hutchins Design Team
- Location: United States
- Year: 2004
- Builder: Com-Pac Yachts
- Role: Cruiser
- Name: Com-Pac Eclipse

Boat
- Displacement: 2,200 lb (998 kg)
- Draft: 5.16 ft (1.57 m) with centerboard down

Hull
- Type: monohull
- Construction: fiberglass
- LOA: 21.33 ft (6.50 m)
- LWL: 18.08 ft (5.51 m)
- Beam: 7.33 ft (2.23 m)
- Engine: outboard motor

Hull appendages
- Keel: stub keel and centerboard
- Ballast: 700 lb (318 kg)
- Rudder: transom-mounted rudder

Rig
- Rig type: Bermuda rig
- I foretriangle height: 19.50 ft (5.94 m)
- J foretriangle base: 7.25 ft (2.21 m)
- P mainsail luff: 19.67 ft (6.00 m)
- E mainsail foot: 8.83 ft (2.69 m)

Sails
- Sailplan: fractional rigged sloop
- Mainsail area: 86.84 sq ft (8.068 m^{2})
- Jib/genoa area: 70.69 sq ft (6.567 m^{2})
- Total sail area: 157.53 sq ft (14.635 m^{2})

The Com-Pac Eclipse is an American trailerable sailboat that was designed by the Hutchins Design Team as a pocket cruiser and first built in 2004.

== Production ==
The design has been built by Com-Pac Yachts in the United States since 2004 and remains in production.

== Design ==
The Com-Pac Eclipse is a recreational keelboat, built predominantly of fiberglass, with wood trim. It has a fractional sloop rig, with a boom gallows and a bowsprit; a plumb stem; an open, walk-through reverse transom with a swim ladder; a transom-hung rudder controlled by a tiller and a fixed stub keel with a centerboard. It displaces 2,200 lb (998 kg) and carries 700 lb (318 kg) of ballast.

The boat has a draft of 5.16 ft (1.57 m) with the centerboard extended and 1.50 ft (0.46 m) with it retracted, allowing operation in shallow water or ground transportation on a trailer.

The boat is normally fitted with a small 3 to 6 hp (2 to 4 kW) outboard motor, mounted on a starboard side transom bracket, for docking and maneuvering.

The design has sleeping accommodation for four people, with a double "V"-berth in the bow cabin and two straight settee quarter berths in the main cabin. The galley is located on the port side just aft of the bow cabin and is equipped with a single-burner stove and a sink. The portable type head is stowed under the companionway ladder. Cabin headroom is 48 in (120 cm).

The design has a hull speed of 5.7 kn (10.6 km/h).

== Operational history ==
In a 2005 review for Sail magazine, Bill Springer wrote, "the 20-foot Eclipse by Com-Pac Yachts makes a strong case for the idea that you don’t need to spend an arm and a leg to be able to sail to your favorite anchorage, eat a hot meal, and sleep in a comfortable bunk. This trailerable coastal cruiser has all the right features—an easy-to-rig mast, simple sailing systems, a centerboard that reduces draft to 1 foot, 6 inches, and a full accommodations plan. "

In a 2010 review Steve Henkel wrote, "despite being less than 19 feet on deck (without the outboard rudder and bow pulpit included in the measurement), the Eclipse 18 looks to us like a bigger boat. In fact in profile she is reminiscent of the much larger Island Packets designed by Bob Johnson, one of the early designers used by Hutchins for their Com-Pac series of boats. Best features: Compared with her comp[etitor]s, the Eclipse can be said to be slightly faster due to her long waterline length and relatively high [sail area to displacement] ratio (though the windage or 'top hamper' of the high boom gallows may give back some of that small speed advantage). For neophytes the gallows may be convenient, although a traditional topping lift or a hard vang might serve just as well. The [company's] advertising indicates that the gallows is part of the mast raising and lowering scheme, which helps to justify its existence. The open transom gives better than average access to the outboard engine controls and serves as a swim platform. Worst features: The boat only sleeps four if two of the occupants are small children consigned to the short V-berth forward."

== See also ==
- List of sailing boat types
