= Jean Street Shipyard =

Shipyard in Tampa

Coordinates: 28.004234°N 82.467787°W

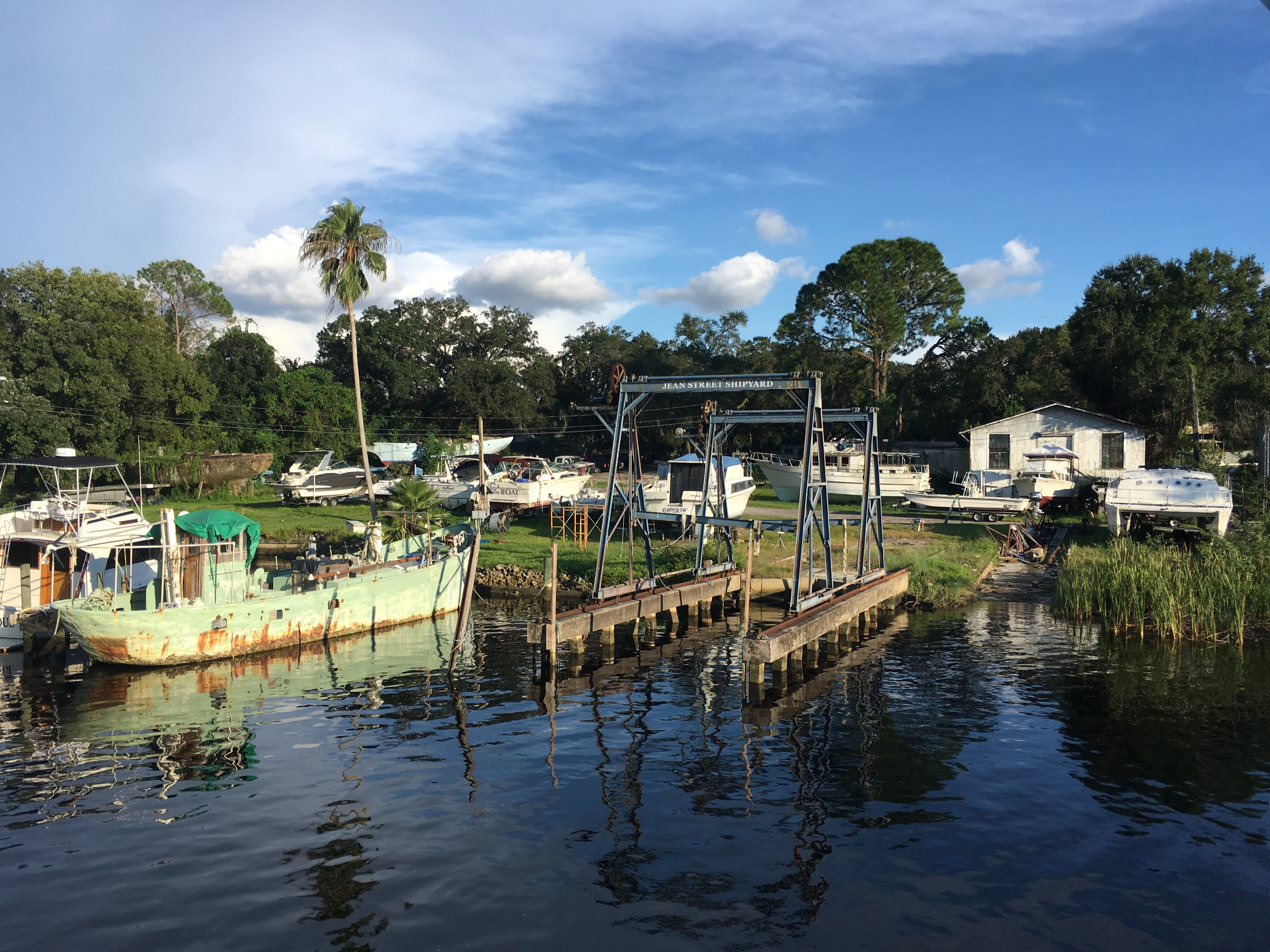
Photo of Jean Street Shipyard from the Hillsborough River

Jean Street Shipyard (established 1843) is a shipyard in the United States, located on the Hillsborough River in Tampa, Florida. It is located approximately 5 miles from the mouth of the Hillsborough River, about 1 mile above the Hillsborough Avenue bridge in what is now the neighborhood of Seminole Heights. It is a full service shipyard with wet slips and a Travelift for hauling vessels from the water.

== History ==
In the 18th century the watershed for the Hillsborough River was covered in old growth forest of bald cypress, longleaf pine, and sand live oak. After the construction of Fort Brooke at the mouth of the Hillsborough River settlers began moving into what would be the Tampa area . While the area of the river near the mouth were populated and a center of trade, the need arose for a shipyard where local craft could be built and existing craft could be hauled, repaired and maintained.

The shipyard was first established in 1843, as far upriver as was navigable on good solid ground. This allowed the shipyard to be surrounded by good quality shipbuilding material, as well as protect it from storms and weather. A massive wharf was built for the loading of local cargo, but the primary function of the shipyard was servicing and repairing riverboats, skiffs, barges, and local sloops. The site was equipped with a machine shop, wood shop, a marine hardware store, and railways for hauling vessels from the water.

James McKay, a schooner captain, was one of the first owners of the shipyard and used the facilities to maintain his cargo and trading vessels, including steamships, schooners, sloops, skiffs, and barges. McKay was heavily invested in Tampa, owning a general store and a sawmill. He also owned two schooners that he used in the cargo trade with Cuba, Central America, and South America. McKay was elected mayor of Tampa in 1859.

During the American Civil War in 1863, Union forces attacked and burned two ships: the steamship "Scottish Chief" and the sloop "Kate Dale" that were moored at the shipyard for maintenance work and to load cargo for their roles as blockade runners, both ships owned by James McKay. This was the only major skirmish Tampa saw during the Civil War and is referred to as the Battle of Fort Brooke.

In 1909, the Federal government funded the dredging of the Hillsborough River to twelve feet from the mouth to Jean Street Shipyard (then known as the Tampa Steam Ways Co.). Around this time the shipyard was bought by Harry C. White, who renamed the site to "White's Marine Ways and Boatworks" in 1928.

During the 1920s and early 1930s the shipyard was one of the many small boat builders in Tampa to build racing powerboats, of which many races and regattas were held along the Hillsborough River.

In 1947, Harry White sold the shipyard to Clinton J. Johnson who founded "Johnson's Boat Works", "Johnson Sails" (now known as JSI and currently operating out of St Petersburg), and "Hillsborough Yacht Storage, Inc." on the same site.

Charley Morgan got his start in the sailing industry working afternoons and weekends while he was in high school for Johnson Sails at Jean Street Shipyard. He later went on to building the Brisote, a 27' yawl in which he raced from St. Petersburg, FL to Havana, Cuba at age 17. After getting out of high school he started his own sail company, eventually going to design many sailing vessels, owning his own sailboat production company Morgan Yachts, and even designing and building an America's Cup contender.

Since the 1970s, Jean Street Shipyard has been used primarily for the repair and storage of boats. It remains in operation to this day with a working TraveLift and repair shop, as well as marine hardware store.
