= Com-Pac Horizon Cat =

Sailboat class

Development
- Designer: Halsey Herreshoff
- Location: United States
- Year: 2002
- Builder: Com-Pac Yachts
- Role: Cruiser
- Name: Com-Pac Horizon Cat

Boat
- Displacement: 2,500 lb (1,134 kg)
- Draft: 5.00 ft (1.52 m), with centerboard down

Hull
- Type: monohull
- Construction: fiberglass
- LOA: 20.00 ft (6.10 m)
- LWL: 17.75 ft (5.41 m)
- Beam: 8.33 ft (2.54 m)
- Engine: outboard motor

Hull appendages
- Keel: stub keel and centerboard
- Ballast: 600 lb (272 kg)
- Rudder: transom-mounted rudder

Rig
- Rig type: Catboat rig

Sails
- Sailplan: gaff rigged catboat
- Mainsail area: 205.00 sq ft (19.045 m^{2})
- Total sail area: 205.00 sq ft (19.045 m^{2})

The Com-Pac Horizon Cat, also called the Horizon Cat 20, is an American trailerable sailboat that was designed by Halsey Herreshoff as cruiser and first built in 2002.

The boat is a development of Halsey Herreshoff's 1971 Herreshoff America, for which Com-Pac Yachts acquired the tooling in 2002.

The Horizon Cat design was developed into the Com-Pac Horizon Day Cat daysailer in 2003.

== Production ==
The Horizon Cat has been built by Com-Pac Yachts in the United States since 2002 and remains in production.

== Design ==
The manufacturer describes the design goals as "a classic boat for the diehard traditional sailor".

The Com-Pac Horizon Cat is a recreational keelboat, built predominantly of fiberglass, with wood trim. It is a gaff-rigged catboat; with a plumb stem; a plumb transom; a transom-hung, kick-up rudder controlled by a wheel and a fixed stub keel with a retractable centerboard. It displaces 2,500 lb (1,134 kg) and carries 600 lb (272 kg) of ballast.

The boat has a draft of 5.00 ft (1.52 m) with the centerboard extended and 2.16 ft (0.66 m) with it retracted, allowing ground transportation on a trailer.

The boat is normally fitted with a small 3 to 6 hp (2 to 4 kW) outboard motor for docking and maneuvering. A Yanmar diesel engine of 6.4 hp (5 kW) is optional.

The design has sleeping accommodation for two people, with two straight settee quarter berths in the main cabin. The galley is located on bot sides, just forward of the settees. The galley is equipped with an icebox and a sink. The fresh water tank has a capacity of 10 U.S. gallons (38 L; 8.3 imp gal). The head is located in the forepeak and has an accordion door. Cabin headroom is 54 in (140 cm).

The design has a hull speed of 5.6 kn (10.4 km/h).

== Operational history ==
In a 2003 article in Cruising World, writer Jeremy McGeary praised the design's beam dimensions, which, but deviating from the norm for New England catboats, allowed to be legally trailerable.

In a 2010 review Steve Henkel wrote, "the Com-Pac Horizon 18 is a reconstruction of the Herreshoff America ... pursued after builder Hutchins bought the tooling from the last of many molders of the original vessel, first built in 1971 ... it is easy to see that many small changes were made in the design—for instance, adding two inches to the beam, and 100 pounds to the ballast (but without increasing the overall weight? hmmmm . . .). Best features: Reduced sail area ... may slow the Horizon down a little in light air, but advantages more than compensate, eg., reefing can be delayed a bit ... and less area results in a lighter mast and boom, making it easier to raise and lower the spars at a launching ramp. The modern deep and high-aspect rudder combined with the keel-centerboard combination should give the Horizon the ability to point higher. The four opening ports and cabintop hatch are a big, plus, especially in summer heat. Worst features: With the new underbody, the ability to remain comfortably upright "on the hard" is lost. As for the steering wheel shown, let it suffice to say a tiller would be better."

== See also ==
- List of sailing boat types
