= Charley Morgan =

American sailboat racer and designer (November 1929 - January 2023)

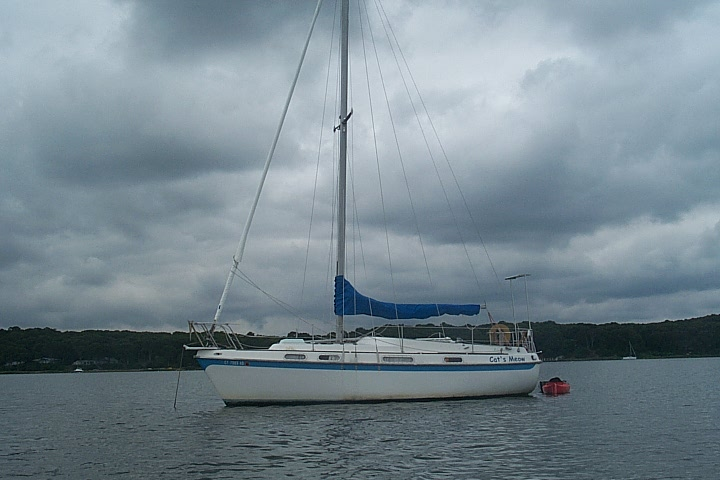
Morgan Out Island 28

Charley E. Morgan (November 17, 1929 - January 7, 2023) was an American sailboat racer and designer. He was best known as the founder of Morgan Yacht Corporation.

== Early life ==
Morgan was born in Chicago November 1929 and raised in Florida. Morgan built the yacht Brisote and completed a St. Petersburg, Florida to Havana, Cuba race with Bruce Bidwell. Morgan attended the University of Tampa and took a job with Johnson Sails, located at the Jean Street Shipyard on the Hillsborough River. In 1952 he founded Morgan Racing Sails in Tampa, FL. While making sails Morgan met yacht designer George Luzier, who got him interested in designing boats.

== Racing ==
In 1957, Morgan, along with Charlie Hunt, designed and built Brisote, a 31-foot plywood yawl. After successfully appealing disqualification due to a lack of engine, he entered the Havana race and took second in Brisote's division. In 1960 Jack Powell commissioned Morgan to build the 40 foot centerboard fiberglass yawl Paper Tiger. The "famously successful" Paper Tiger won the SORC Southern Ocean Racing Conference in 1961 and 1962.

== Morgan Yachts ==
Unable to find a builder to manufacture the Tiger Cub, a smaller version of Paper Tiger, Morgan founded the Morgan Yacht Corporation St. Petersburg, Florida, 1965 after graduating high school and starting his own sail company. Morgan suffered the misfortune of falling ill with tuberculosis, delaying production. Morgan asked Bidwell to join the business, delivering the first yacht in 1965. Early models included the Tiger Cub and fiberglass sloop Morgan 34. The company grossed 1.7 million in 1965.

The company's first model was the Morgan 34 built in fiberglass. This was followed by the Morgan 24, 30, 41, and 45. The Morgan 41 designed by Morgan, his most popular design, became a standard in the sailing charter industry for its strength, simplicity, and space belowdecks. In response to customer feedback while operating Morgan Yacht, Morgan designed the shallow draft Morgan Out Island 41, "the most popular boat over 40 feet overall ever built." First built in 1971 the spacious boat became popular with charter companies, becoming "the standard charter boat." The Out Island 33 was designed and first produced in mid-1971 as part of the Morgan Out Island series.

Morgan's involvement in the company ended in 1972.

Ownership of Morgan Yacht was sold to Beatrice Foods in 1968, providing funds for Morgan to design and build the wooden 12-meter yacht Heritage to compete for selection as defender of the America's Cup. Morgan acted as skipper during the defender selection trials but lost to Intrepid. After Morgan left the company was passed from one corporate entity to another, until it came into the hands of Catalina Yachts in 1984. Catalina continued manufacturing a few models, including the Out Island 41, before the Morgan name was retired.

== Later life ==
Morgan left Morgan Yachts in 1972. Beatrice Foods sold the company to Catalina Yachts in 1984 and sold a redesigned Morgan Out Island 41 from 1986 to 1993.

Morgan found Heritage Yacht Corporation in 1975, producing trawlers and sailing yachts. The company was forced into bankruptcy and ownership transferred to Catalina Yachts. Heritage Yachts sold the tooling for their line of Morgan Trawlers to Chris-Craft and Morgan began working for Chris-Craft, doing design work on their trawler line.

Morgan later designed the Com-pac 35 under contract for Hutchins Yachts.

== Designs ==
- Columbia 40
- Morgan 22
- Morgan 24/25
- Morgan 34
- Morgan Out Island 41
- Morgan 41 aka M41
- Morgan 42 aka M42-1
- Morgan 42 aka M42-2
