= Cornish Shrimper 19 =

Sailboat class

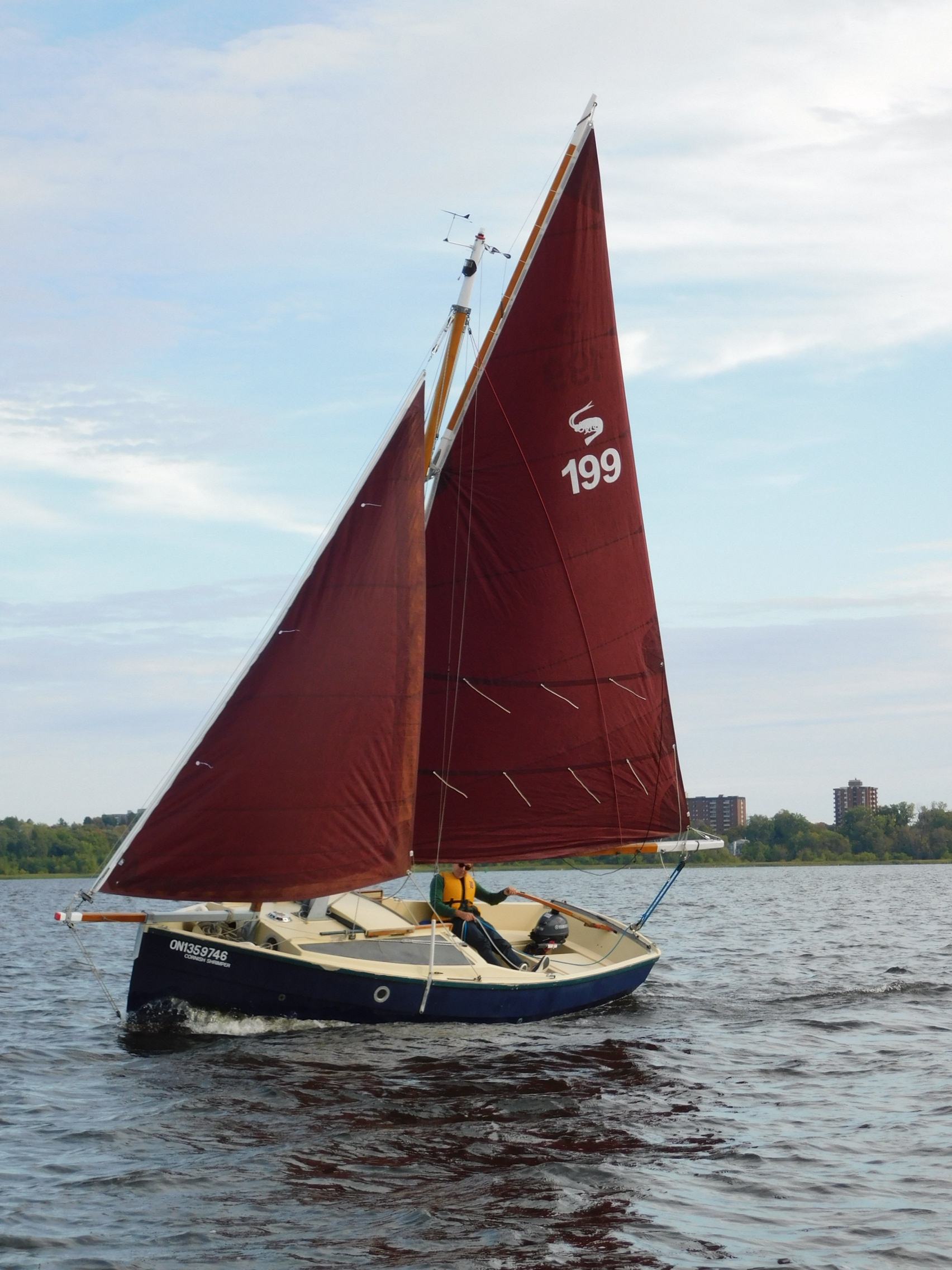

Development
- Designer: Roger Dongray
- Location: United Kingdom
- Year: 1979
- No. built: more than 1100
- Builder: Cornish Crabbers
- Name: Cornish Shrimper 19

Boat
- Displacement: 2,348 lb (1,065 kg)
- Draft: 4.00 ft (1.22 m) with centreboard down

Hull
- Type: Monohull
- Construction: Glassfibre
- LOA: 19.25 ft (5.87 m), 22.5 ft (6.9 m) with the bowsprit
- LWL: 17.58 ft (5.36 m)
- Beam: 7.16 ft (2.18 m)
- Engine: Yanmar 1GM 9 hp (7 kW) diesel engine or outboard motor

Hull appendages
- Keel: stub keel and centreboard
- Rudder: transom-mounted rudder

Rig
- Rig type: gaff rig

Sails
- Sailplan: Fractional rigged gaff head sloop
- Total sail area: 194.00 sq ft (18.023 m^{2})

The Cornish Shrimper 19 is a British trailerable sailboat that was designed by Roger Dongray, inspired by traditional shrimp fishery boat designs and first built in 1979.

== Production ==
The design has been built by Cornish Crabbers in Wadebridge, Cornwall in the United Kingdom since 1979. The company has built more than 1,100 examples of the design and it remains in production.

== Design ==
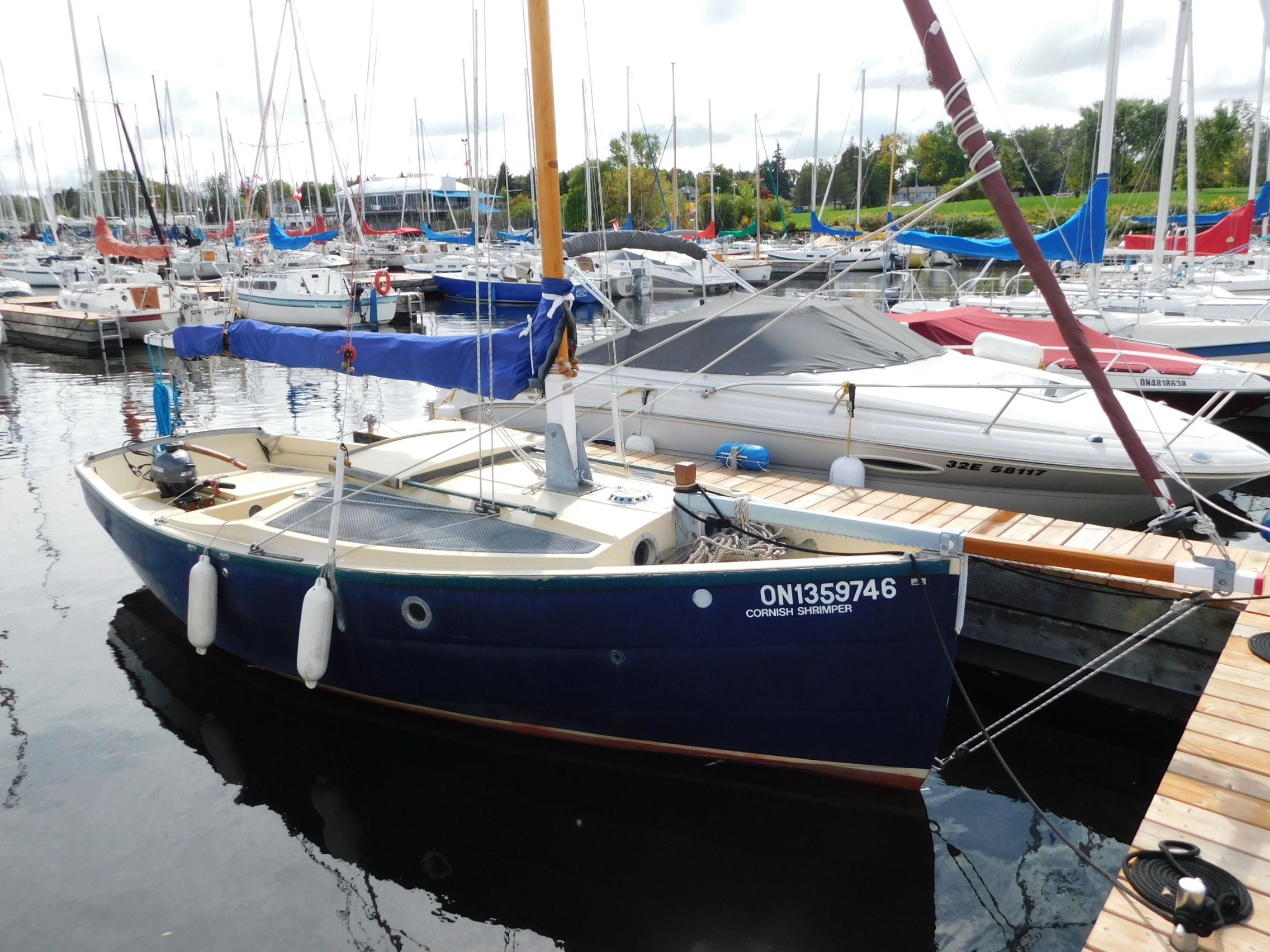
Cornish Shrimper 19

The Cornish Shrimper 19 is a recreational keelboat, built predominantly of hand-laid, solid glassfibre, with wood trim and wooden spars. It has a gaff rig sloop with a wooden bowsprit, a plumb stem, an angled transom, a transom-hung rudder controlled by a tiller and a stub keel with a centreboard. It displaces 2,348 lb (1,065 kg).

The boat has a draft of 4.00 ft (1.22 m) with the centreboard extended and 1.50 ft (0.46 m) with it retracted, allowing ground transportation on a trailer.

The boat is normally fitted with a well-mounted outboard motor, or optionally with a Japanese Yanmar 1GM diesel engine of 9 hp (7 kW) for docking and maneuvering.

== Operational history ==
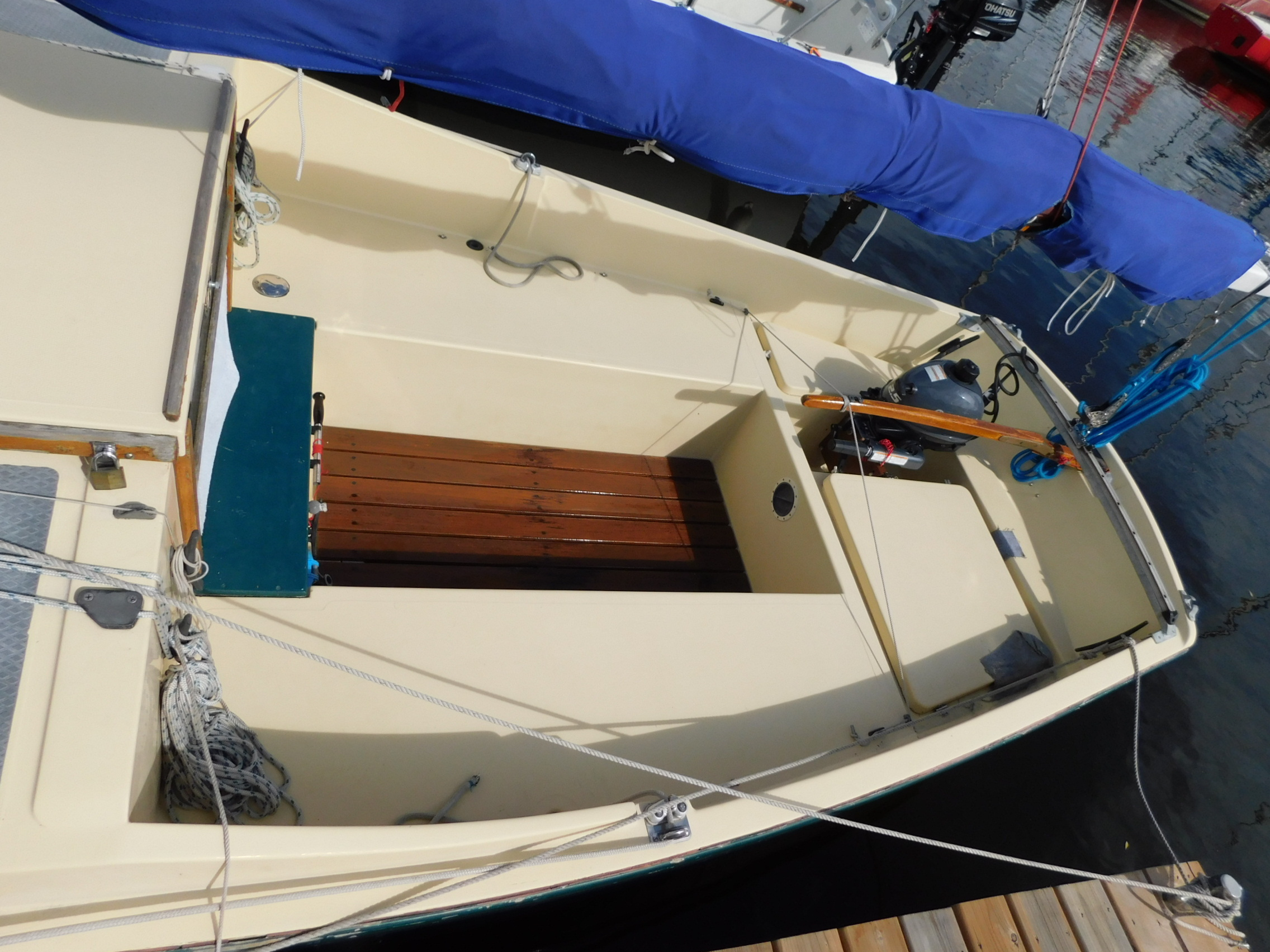
Cornish Shrimper 19 cockpit

In a 2010 review Steve Henkel wrote, "This is a character boat with concomitant grace, and with a good measure of performance and practicality, too. What she lacks in headroom, she makes up in charm. In England, she has cult-boat status. Best features: The outboard well, placed inside the cockpit. gives easy access to engine controls and helps maintain vessel’s good looks. Extensive use of varnished wood below lends a touch of elegance. Short bilge runners allow the boat to take the ground nearly upright. Foam buoyancy for safety is built in under cockpit seats and under foredeck. Handy self-draining bow well in the foredeck gives secure stowage for ground tackle. Ramp launching is easier than comps due to shallow draft. Sturdy tabernacle is judged easier to use than a mere hinge on deck when raising and lowering mast. Worst features: New and resale prices are high, and headroom is low, compared to comps. Cockpit footwell is non-self-bailing. Substantial use of varnished wood looks great, but means more than ordinary maintenance is needed."

A 2013 review in Cruising World by Jen Brett, described the design as "a salty little boat" and noted "with a large cockpit, the Shrimper makes an excellent daysailer for a family, and the basic yet comfortable accommodations below allow the boat to be a simple coastal cruiser." Of the boat's looks, she wrote, "you’ll definitely turn heads while sailing through the harbor".

== See also ==
- List of sailing boat types

Similar sailboats

- Com-Pac 19
- Mariner 19
- Mercury 18
- Nordica 16
- Sanibel 18
- West Wight Potter 19
