= Morgan 24/25 =

1960s US recreational keelboat

- M 25

Development
- Designer: Charles Morgan
- Location: United States
- Year: 1965
- No. built: 460
- Builder: Morgan Yachts
- Role: Racer-Cruiser
- Name: Morgan 24/25

Boat
- Displacement: 4,900 lb (2,223 kg)
- Draft: 7.00 ft (2.13 m) with centerboard down

Hull
- Type: monohull
- Construction: fiberglass
- LOA: 24.92 ft (7.60 m)
- LWL: 21.50 ft (6.55 m)
- Beam: 8.00 ft (2.44 m)
- Engine: outboard motor or Universal Atomic 4 inboard gasoline engine

Hull appendages
- Keel: modified long keel and centerboard
- Ballast: 1,900 lb (862 kg)
- Rudder: internally-mounted spade-type rudder

Rig
- Rig type: Bermuda rig
- I foretriangle height: 31.00 ft (9.45 m)
- J foretriangle base: 9.75 ft (2.97 m)
- P mainsail luff: 27.00 ft (8.23 m)
- E mainsail foot: 11.50 ft (3.51 m)

Sails
- Sailplan: masthead sloop
- Mainsail area: 155.25 sq ft (14.423 m^{2})
- Jib/genoa area: 151.13 sq ft (14.040 m^{2})
- Total sail area: 306.38 sq ft (28.464 m^{2})

Racing
- PHRF: 225

The Morgan 24/25, is a recreational keelboat built by Morgan Yachts in the United States between 1965 and 1976, with 460 boats completed.

== Design ==
The design concept was originally conceived by Morgan as a boat with a length overall (LOA) of under 24.50 ft (7.47 m), to be marketed as the Morgan 24. By the time the design was finalized and produced the LOA had become 24.92 ft (7.60 m), although Morgan never got around to changing the model designation. When Morgan Yachts was bought out by the Gerber Products Company in 1972, their marketing department re-designated it as the Morgan 25. Since boats made under either designation are similar, it is commonly referred to as the Morgan 24/25. The boat was later reintroduced under the designation Morgan Classic 250.

The Morgan 24/25 is built predominantly of fiberglass, with wood trim. It has a masthead sloop rig with aluminum spars, a spooned raked stem, a plumb transom, an internally mounted spade-type rudder controlled by a tiller and a fixed modified long keel, with a retractable centerboard. It displaces 4,900 lb (2,223 kg) and carries 1,900 lb (862 kg) of lead ballast.

The boat has a draft of 7.00 ft (2.13 m) with the centerboard extended and 2.80 ft (0.85 m) with it retracted, allowing operation in shallow water or ground transportation on a trailer.

The boat is fitted with a Universal Atomic 4 gasoline engine or a small 6 to 9 hp (4 to 7 kW) outboard motor for docking and maneuvering.

The design has sleeping accommodation for four people, with a double "V"-berth in the bow cabin and two straight settee berths in the main cabin. The galley is located on both sides, admidships, just aft of the bow cabin. The galley is equipped with a two-burner stove and food locker to port and a sink and ice box to starboard. The head is located in between the bow cabin "V"-berths. Cabin headroom is 68 in (173 cm). When fitted, the fresh water tank has a capacity of 20 U.S. gallons (76 L; 17 imp gal). There was also an alternate interior with a dinette table to port.

The design has a PHRF racing average handicap of 225 and a hull speed of 6.2 kn (11.5 km/h).

== Reception ==
In a 2010 review Steve Henkel wrote, "in 1990 we moved from Connecticut to Florida and found a 1968 Morgan 25 'project boat' to fix up ... We loved the boat, and won races with our local sailing club fleet in Sarasota, FL. Best features: The boat is fast, weatherly, and especially good in light air. She's also an easy singlehander and terrific weekender for two. Her hull is easily driven; our 6 hp Yamaha with a high-thrust prop easily drove her at hull speed. Worst features: There were problems with the centerboard pendant system, which involved a rod passing through a packing gland—a real Rube Goldberg affair."

In a 2016 review Darrell Nicholson wrote in Practical Sailor, "she's fast and roomy, but plagued by centerboard problems that are tough to avoid." Of its sailing qualities, he wrote, "the long, deep board helps the 24/25 to point high, and its low wetted surface, especially with board up, gives extra speed on reaches and runs. The boat performs best in 5 to 15 knots of breeze, but can handle much higher winds when properly reefed, though several owners reported that the boat could be a bit stiffer. The 24/25 is unusually well balanced, and in ordinary weather can be made to self-steer on a beat or close reach with tiller lashed. However, in very heavy air carrying a chute, it has a marked tendency to broach."
