= Morgan 22 =

1960s US recreational keelboat

- M 22

Development
- Designer: Charles Morgan
- Location: United States
- Year: 1968
- Builder: Morgan Yachts
- Role: Racer-Cruiser
- Name: Morgan 22

Boat
- Displacement: 2,700 lb (1,225 kg)
- Draft: 4.92 ft (1.50 m) with centerboard down

Hull
- Type: monohull
- Construction: fiberglass
- LOA: 21.42 ft (6.53 m)
- LWL: 20.33 ft (6.20 m)
- Beam: 8.00 ft (2.44 m)
- Engine: outboard motor

Hull appendages
- Keel: stub keel and centerboard
- Ballast: 1,400 lb (635 kg)
- Rudder: transom-mounted rudder

Rig
- Rig type: Bermuda rig
- I foretriangle height: 27.00 ft (8.23 m)
- J foretriangle base: 8.50 ft (2.59 m)
- P mainsail luff: 23.50 ft (7.16 m)
- E mainsail foot: 10.50 ft (3.20 m)

Sails
- Sailplan: masthead sloop
- Mainsail area: 123.38 sq ft (11.462 m^{2})
- Jib/genoa area: 114.75 sq ft (10.661 m^{2})
- Total sail area: 238.13 sq ft (22.123 m^{2})

Racing
- PHRF: 249

The Morgan 22 is a recreational keelboat built by Morgan Yachts in the United States, from 1968 until 1971.

== Design ==
The Morgan 22 is built predominantly of fiberglass, with wood trim. It has a masthead sloop rig, a raked stem, a plumb transom, a transom-hung rudder controlled by a tiller and a fixed stub keel with a retractable centerboard. It displaces 2,700 lb (1,225 kg) and carries 1,400 lb (635 kg) of lead ballast.

The boat has a draft of 4.92 ft (1.50 m) with the centerboard extended and 1.80 ft (0.55 m) with it retracted, allowing operation in shallow water, or ground transportation on a trailer.

The boat is normally fitted with a small 3 to 6 hp (2 to 4 kW) outboard motor for docking and maneuvering.

The design has sleeping accommodation for four people, with a double "V"-berth in the bow cabin, drop-down dinette table that converts to a single berth in the main cabin and an aft quarter berth on the port side. The galley is located on the port side just forward of the companionway ladder. The galley is equipped with a two-burner stove, a top-loading icebox and a sink. The head is a marine toilet centered under the "V"-berth in the bow cabin. Cabin headroom is 54 in (137 cm).

The design has a PHRF racing average handicap of 249 and a hull speed of 6.0 kn (11.1 km/h).

== Reception ==
In a 2010 review Steve Henkel wrote, "... the Morgan 22, Charlie Morgan's smallest racer-cruiser, compared to her comp[etitor]s is no match for space below, but on the other hand, we think she would be the clear winner in a round-the-buoys race against both the Bayfield 23 and the Montgomery 23, despite the Montgomery's 15-seconds-per-mile lower PHRF rating. (Sometimes the ratings just don't seem fair.) Best features: She is fast, weatherly, and easy to handle—three good reasons for new sailors to choose her as their first cruising boat. Her two-person dinette with removable table that converts the dinette into a berth is comfortable and useful as a chart table. Worst features: Her centerboard control pendant is a Rube Goldberg affair, which needs periodic inspection and—almost always—eventual replacement."

== See also ==
- List of sailing boat types
