= Cornish Crabbers =

Sailboat manufacturer

Cornish Crabbers LLP
- Company type: Privately held company
- Industry: Boat building
- Founded: 1974
- Founder: Roger Dongray; Peter Keeling; Ken Robertson
- Defunct: 2024
- Headquarters: Rock, Cornwall, United Kingdom
- Products: Sailboats, powerboats
- Website: Archived web.archive.org/web/20231222101951/http://www.cornishcrabbers.co.uk/

Cornish Crabbers LLP is a British boat builder based in Rock, Cornwall. The company specializes in the design and manufacture of glassfibre gaff-rigged sailboats and powerboats. It was founded by boat designer Roger Dongray, as well as Peter Keeling and Ken Robertson in 1974.

The company is organized as a British limited liability partnership. In March of 2024 Cornish Crabbers declared insolvency owing £1,000,000 in debts and has been placed into voluntary liquidation.

== History ==
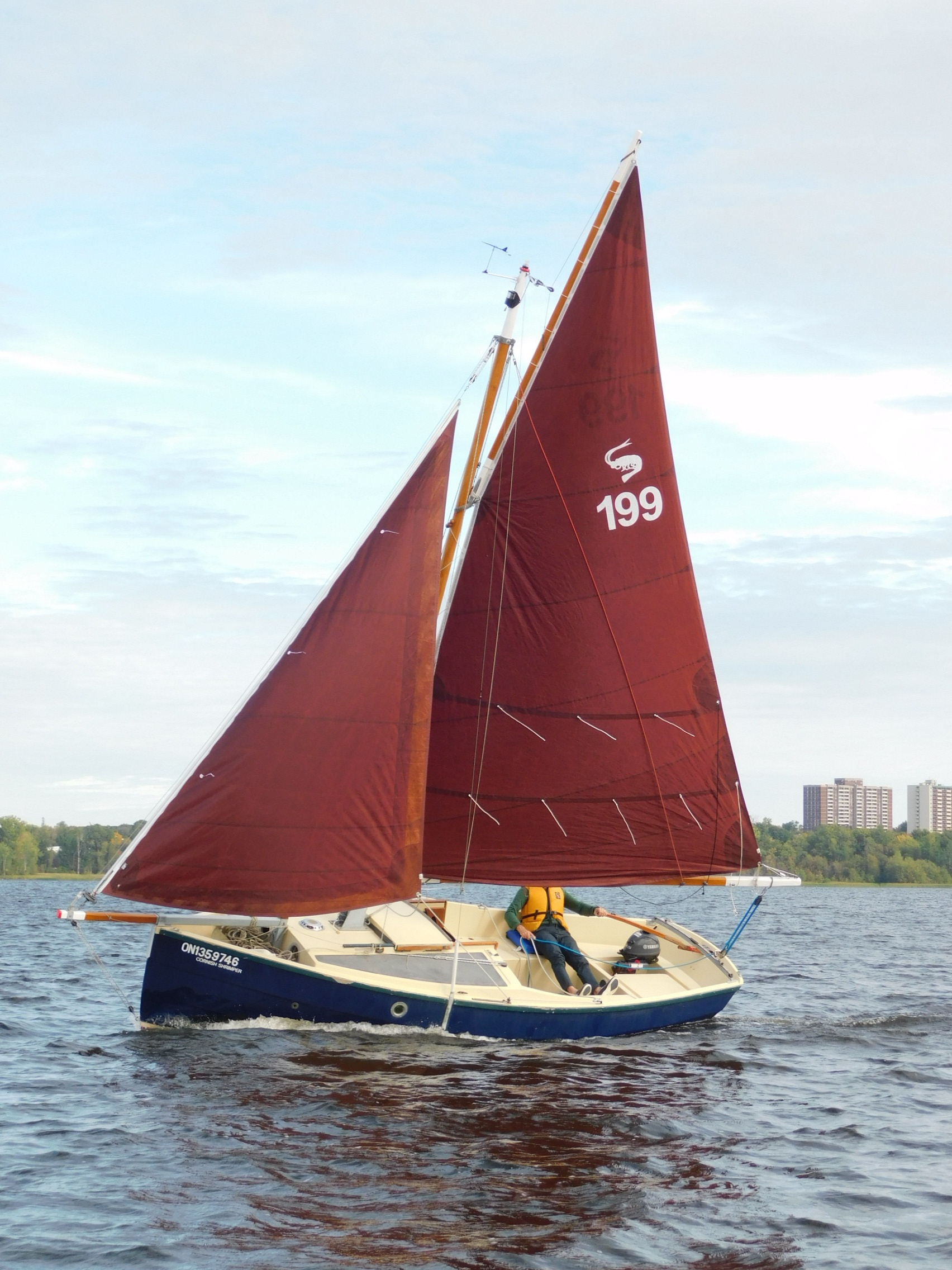
Cornish Shrimper 19

The company was formed as Westerly Boats and later renamed Cornish Crabbers. The first boat was the Cornish Crabber 24 Mark I, initially a wooden boat, later built in glassfibre.

The Cornish Shrimper 19 followed in 1979 and proved to be the company's best selling design. It is the also the best selling trailer sailer in Europe. Steve Henkel noted in his 2010 book, The Sailor's Book of Small Cruising Sailboats, "this is a character boat with concomitant grace, and with a good measure of performance and practicality, too. What she lacks in headroom, she makes up in charm. In England, she has cult-boat status." John Leather, writing in The Gaff Rig Handbook: History, Design, Techniques, Developments described it as "probably the most successful modern gaffer" (gaff-rigged boat).

By 2001 the company had established itself as the leading producer of gaff-rigged boats.

In 2021 the company was producing 12 sailboat designs and three powerboats in the Clam series.

== Boats ==
Summary of boats built by Cornish Crabbers:

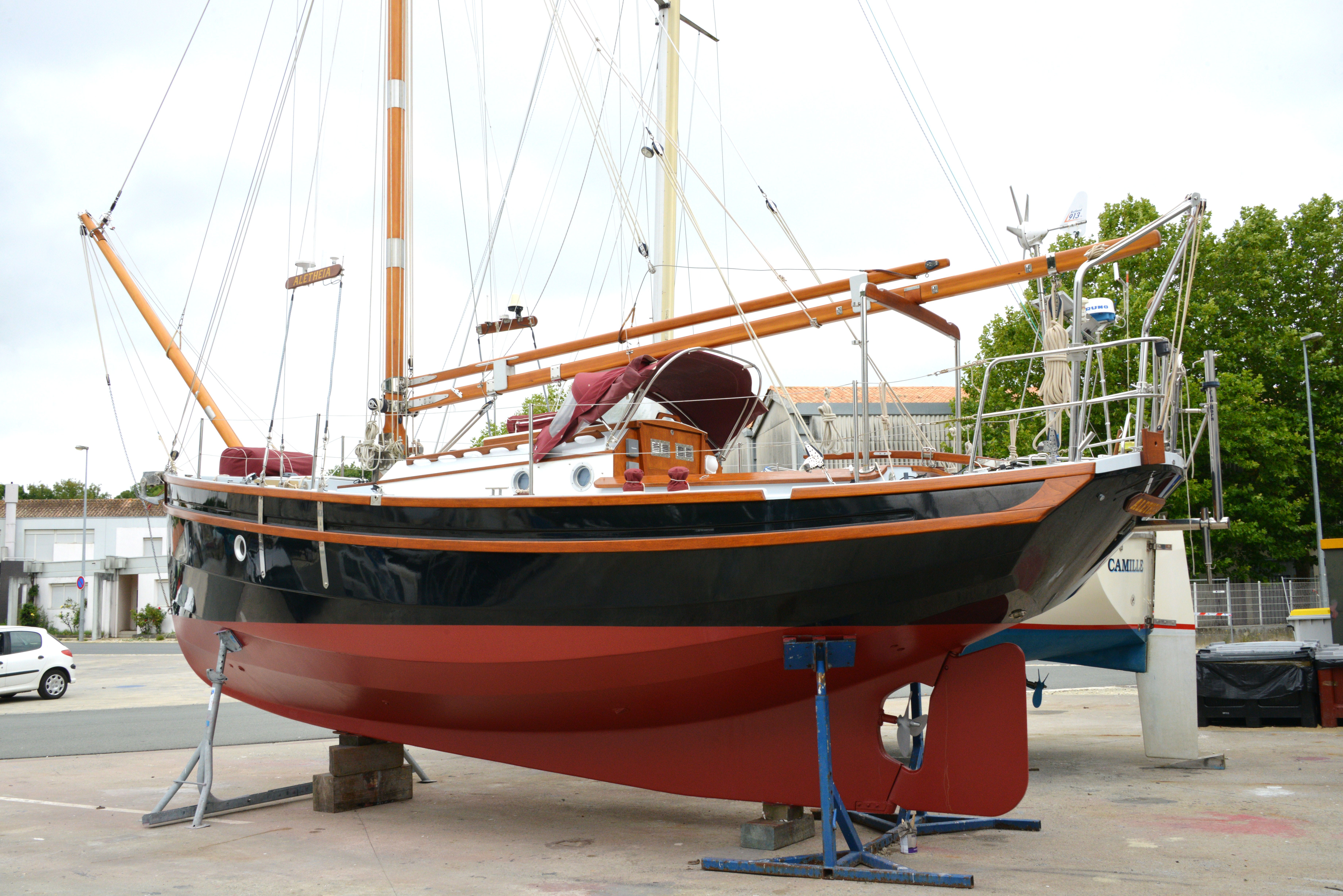
Cornish Crabbers Pilot Cutter 30

- Adventure 17
- Adventure 19
- Adventure 21
- Adventure 26
- Clam 17
- Clam 19
- Clam 21
- Cornish Crabber 22
- Cornish Crabber 24
- Cornish Crabber 26
- Cornish Shrimper 17
- Cornish Shrimper 19
- Cornish Shrimper 21
- Cormorant 12 1984
- Cornish Crabber Pilot 30
- Cornish Crabber 17
- Crabber 17
- Limpet 10
- Mystery 35
- Mystery 30

== See also ==
- List of sailboat designers and manufacturers
