= Com-Pac Legacy =

Sailboat class

Development
- Location: United States
- Year: 2006
- Builder: Com-Pac Yachts
- Role: Cruiser
- Name: Com-Pac Legacy

Boat
- Displacement: 1,000 lb (454 kg)
- Draft: 3.51 ft (1.07 m) with centerboard down

Hull
- Type: monohull
- Construction: fiberglass
- LOA: 16.50 ft (5.03 m)
- LWL: 14.25 ft (4.34 m)
- Beam: 6.00 ft (1.83 m)
- Engine: outboard motor

Hull appendages
- Keel: keel with centerboard
- Ballast: 400 lb (181 kg)
- Rudder: transom-mounted rudder

Rig
- Rig type: Bermuda rig

Sails
- Sailplan: fractional rigged sloop
- Total sail area: 130 sq ft (12 m^{2})

The Com-Pac Legacy, also called the Com-Pac Legacy 17, is an American trailerable sailboat that was designed as a pocket cruiser and first built in 2006.

The Com-Pac Legacy is a development of the 1972 Com-Pac 16.

== Production ==
The design was built by Com-Pac Yachts in the United States, starting in 2006.

== Design ==
The Com-Pac Legacy is a recreational keelboat, built predominantly of fiberglass, with wood trim. It has a fractional sloop rig; a plumb stem; a reverse transom that slopes to a plumb transom; a transom-hung, kick-up rudder controlled by a tiller and a fixed stub keel, with a centerboard. It displaces 1,000 lb (454 kg) and carries 400 lb (181 kg) of lead ballast.

The design incorporates a folding boom and mast that allows the mainsheet to be unhooked, the boom to be folded up against the mast and then the mast pivoted aft to lay on a transom-mounted crutch, making launching and recovery from the trailer easier.

The boat has a draft of 3.51 ft (1.07 m) with the centerboard extended and 1.35 ft (0.41 m) with it retracted, allowing ground transportation on a trailer.

The boat is normally fitted with a small 2 to 4 hp (1 to 3 kW) outboard motor for docking and maneuvering.

The design has sitting or sleeping accommodation for two people below decks. The head is a portable type. Cabin headroom is 39 in (99 cm).

The design has a hull speed of 5.1 kn (9.4 km/h).

== Operational history ==
In a 2010 review Steve Henkel wrote, "the Com-Pac Legacy 17 is the successor to the Com-Pac 16, the first sailboat the Hutchins Company built, back in 1975, The new ... boat has gained three inches on the waterline compared to her older sister, adding a theoretical half a knot to her maximum speed. She is also 100 pounds lighter, with 50 of those coming out her [of] lead ballast. Most other dimensions remain the same as the original Com-Pac 16 ... While sailing, a slightly taller rig should make her faster in light air compared to her older sister. Worst features: Compared with her comp[etitor]s, relatively low headroom and narrow beam somewhat restrict cabin space."

== See also ==
- List of sailing boat types

Related development

- Com-Pac 16
