= Cornish Crabber 24 =

Sailboat class

Cornish Crabber 24 Mk I
Development
- Designer: Roger Dongray
- Location: United Kingdom
- Year: 1974
- Builder: Cornish Crabbers
- Role: Cruiser
- Name: Cornish Crabber 24 Mk I

Boat
- Displacement: 4,600 lb (2,087 kg)
- Draft: 4.67 ft (1.42 m) with centreboard down

Hull
- Type: monohull
- Construction: glassfibre
- LOA: 29.25 ft (8.92 m)
- LWL: 20.25 ft (6.17 m)
- Beam: 8.00 ft (2.44 m)
- Engine: Sole 9 hp (7 kW) diesel engine

Hull appendages
- Keel: stub keel with centreboard
- Ballast: 600 lb (272 kg)
- Rudder: keel-mounted rudder

Rig
- Rig type: gaff rigged topsail cutter

Sails
- Sailplan: gaff rigged topsail cutter
- Mainsail area: 155 sq ft (14.4 m^{2})
- Jib/genoa area: 50 sq ft (4.6 m^{2})
- Other sails: staysail 60 sq ft (5.6 m^{2}), topsail 40 sq ft (3.7 m^{2})
- Total sail area: 305 sq ft (28.3 m^{2})

Racing
- PHRF: 360

The Cornish Crabber 24 is a series of British trailerable sailboats, designed by Roger Dongray as cruisers and first built in 1974.

== Production ==
The design has been built by Cornish Crabbers in Wadebridge, Cornwall, United Kingdom since 1974. It has passed through five marks with the Mark V remaining in production.

== Design ==
The Cornish Crabber 24 series are all recreational sailboats, originally built from wood, they are now predominantly of glassfibre, with wooden trim. The boats are gaff rigged topsail cutters, with plumb stems, angled transoms, bowsprits and keel-hung rudders controlled by a tiller.

The Mark I was originally fitted with a British Sole inboard engine, but later models use a Japanese Yanmar diesel engine of 8 to 18 hp (6 to 13 kW) or an outboard motor for docking and manoeuvring.

The Mark I has sleeping accommodation for four people, with a double "V"-berth in the bow cabin and two straight settee quarter berths in the main cabin. The galley is located on the starboard side just aft of the bow cabin. The galley is equipped with a stove and a sink. The head is located centred in the bow cabin, under the "V"-berth. Cabin headroom is 51 in (130 cm).

== Variants ==
Cornish Crabber 24 Mark I
This model was designed by Roger Dongray and introduced in 1974. It was originally made of marine plywood and later of glassfibre. It has a length overall of 29.25 ft (8.9 m) with the bowsprit, a length on deck of 24 ft (7.3 m), a waterline length of 20.24 ft (6.2 m), displaces 4,600 lb (2,087 kg) and carries 600 lb (272 kg) of ballast. The boat has a draft of 4.67 ft (1.42 m) with the centreboard extended and 2.42 ft (0.74 m) with it retracted, allowing operation in shallow water or ground transportation on a trailer. The boat is fitted with a 9 hp (7 kW) British Sole or a Japanese Yanmar diesel engine of 8 to 18 hp (6 to 13 kW). The boat has a PHRF racing average handicap of 360 and a hull speed of 6.0 kn (11.1 km/h).
Cornish Crabber 24 Mark II
This model displaces 5,200 lb (2,359 kg) and has a rig with a large area mainsail and a gaff with higher peak angle.
Cornish Crabber 24 Mark III
This model was introduced in the early 1990s and brought a fixed, deeper draft, long keel.
Cornish Crabber 24 Mark IV
Improved model, with the fixed, deeper draft long keel.
Cornish Crabber 24 Mark V
This current production model has a new hull that was designed by Andrew Wolstenholme and a gaff-rigged mainsail, a staysail and a jib. It has a length overall of 28.25 ft (8.6 m) with the bowsprit, a length on deck of 24.0 ft (7.3 m), a waterline length of 21.83 ft (6.7 m) and displaces 4,950 lb (2,245 kg). The boat has a draft of 4.58 ft (1.40 m) with the centerboard extended and 2.33 ft (0.71 m) with it retracted, allowing operation in shallow water or ground transportation on a trailer. The boat is fitted with a Japanese Yanmar 2YM15 diesel engine. The fuel tank holds 43 litres (9.5 imp gal; 11 US gal).

== Operational history ==
The boat is supported by an active class club, the Cornish Crabbers Club.

In a 2010 review of the Mark I and II Steve Henkel wrote, "The Cornish Crabber can be ordered in a variety of permutations. One choice is the rig: either (A) a gaff-headed mainsail with a standard topsail flying over it (top sailplan), which permits quick sail reduction when the wind pipes up, just by striking the topsail; or (B) the 'Mark II,' a rig with a larger main and a higher peaked gaff (bottom sailplan), which is more efficient to windward and in light air (but still not as efficient as a Marconi rig). The Mk II has 600 Ibs. more displacement (compared to the base case of 4,600 lbs.) and a couple of inches difference in some dimensions (i.e., the Mk II sits 2 inches deeper in the water, making bridge clearance 2 inches less). Outboard power (8 hp recommended) or a 10 hp Yanmar diesel are also choices. Best features: As a character boat, the Cornish Crabber is hard to beat. But you have to like 'pulling a lot of strings,' that is, halyards, sheets, reef lines, and so on. Worst features: In light air the boat's weight is a bit too much for her sail area, with either rig. Not to put too fine an edge on it, in light air she’s slow. (Note high PHRF.)"

In a 2017 review Jack Hornor wrote, "the Cornish Crabber 24 is a handsome little yacht, which will get attention wherever she sails, and its fair to assume that owners and admirers of this classic take considerable pride in their boats."

== See also ==
- List of sailing boat types
