= Com-Pac 16 =

Sailboat class

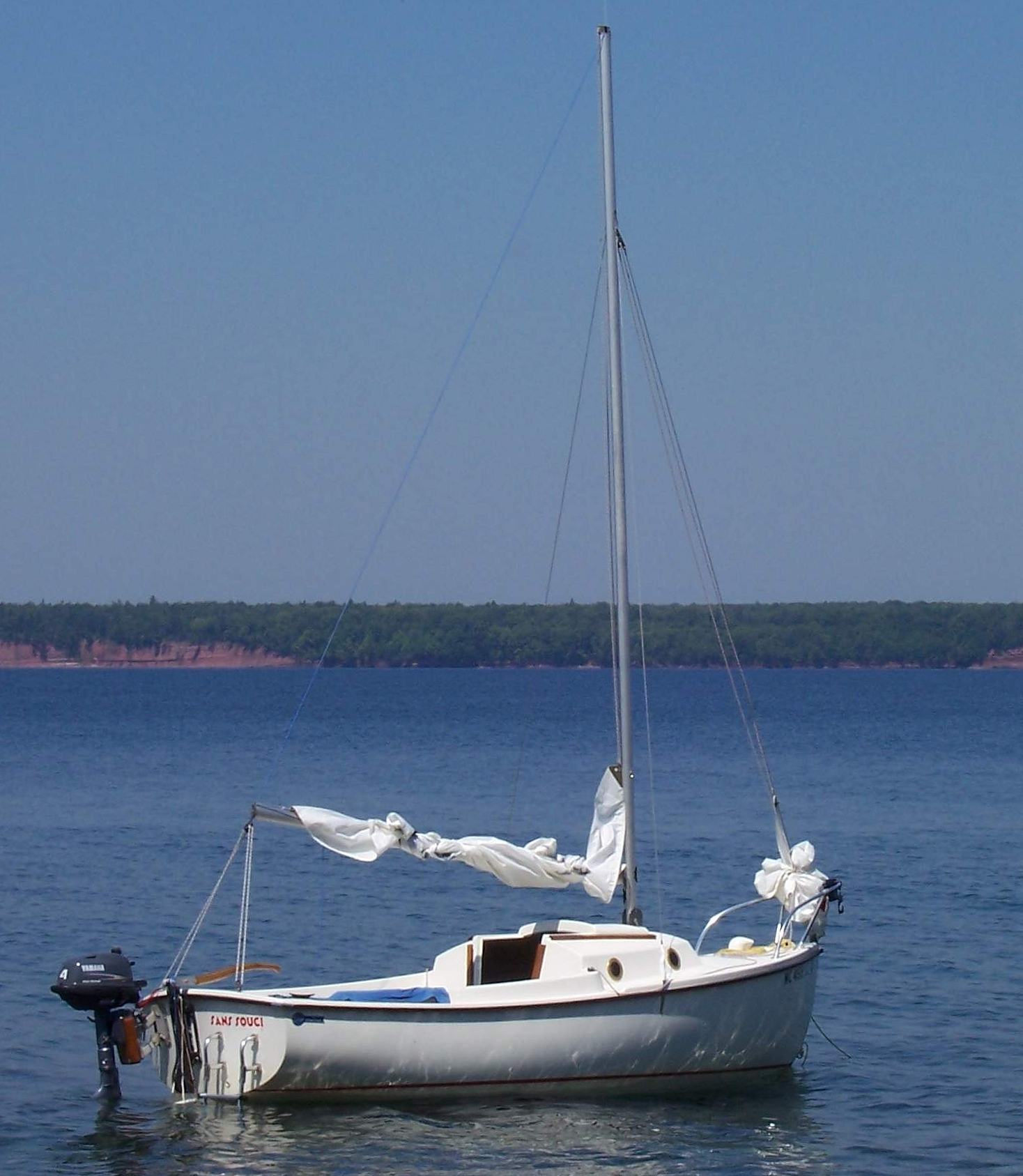

Development
- Designer: Clark Mills
- Location: United States
- Year: 1972
- No. built: over 2,800
- Builder: Com-Pac Yachts
- Role: Cruiser
- Name: Com-Pac 16

Boat
- Crew: two
- Displacement: 1,100 lb (499 kg)
- Draft: 1.50 ft (0.46 m)

Hull
- Type: Monohull
- Construction: Fiberglass
- LOA: 16.00 ft (4.88 m)
- LWL: 14.00 ft (4.27 m)
- Beam: 6.00 ft (1.83 m)
- Engine: Outboard motor

Hull appendages
- Keel: fin keel
- Ballast: 450 lb (204 kg)
- Rudder: transom-mounted rudder

Rig
- Rig type: Bermuda rig
- I foretriangle height: 12.75 ft (3.89 m)
- J foretriangle base: 4.50 ft (1.37 m)
- P mainsail luff: 16.25 ft (4.95 m)
- E mainsail foot: 8.00 ft (2.44 m)

Sails
- Sailplan: 7/8 Fractional rigged sloop
- Mainsail area: 65 sq ft (6.0 m^{2})
- Jib/genoa area: 55 sq ft (5.1 m^{2})
- Spinnaker area: 117 sq ft (10.9 m^{2})
- Total sail area: 120 sq ft (11 m^{2})

Racing
- PHRF: 326

The Com-Pac 16 is an American trailerable sailboat that was designed by Clark Mills as a small cruiser and first built in 1972.

The design was superseded in production by the Com-Pac Legacy in 2006.

== Production ==
The design was built by Com-Pac Yachts in the United States, starting in 1972. Over 2,800 boats were completed, but it is now out of production.

== Design ==
The Com-Pac 16 is a recreational keelboat, built predominantly of fiberglass, with teak wood trim. It has a 7/8 fractional sloop rig with anodized aluminum spars and a bowsprit. The hull has a spooned plumb stem, a vertical transom, a transom-hung rudder controlled by a tiller and a fixed fin, shoal-draft keel.

The boat has a draft of 18 in (46 cm) with the standard keel and is normally fitted with a small outboard motor for docking and maneuvering.

The design has sleeping accommodation for two people in two 96 in (240 cm) berths. The head is a portable type. Ventilation is provided by a single foredeck hatch. Stowage space includes a lazarette.

For sailing the design may be equipped with either a working jib or a genoa. It has jiffy reefing, navigation lights, a stainless steel pulpit, a boarding ladder and a self-bailing cockpit.

The design has a PHRF racing average handicap of 326. It is normally raced with a crew of two sailors.

== Variants ==
Com-Pac 16
This model was introduced in 1971. It has a length overall of 16.00 ft (4.9 m), a waterline length of 14.00 ft (4.3 m), displaces 1,100 lb (499 kg) and carries 450 lb (204 kg) of ballast.
Com-Pac 16 Mark II
This model was introduced in 1975. It has a length overall of 16.92 ft (5.2 m), a waterline length of 14.00 ft (4.3 m), displaces 1,100 lb (499 kg) and carries 450 lb (204 kg) of ballast.

== Operational history ==
In a 1994 review Richard Sherwood described the design as, "a small, trailerable cruiser with a fixed, shoal draft keel."

== See also ==
- List of sailing boat types
