= Cornish Crabber 17 =

Sailboat class

Development
- Designer: Roger Dongray
- Location: United Kingdom
- Year: 1989
- Builder: Cornish Crabbers
- Role: Day sailer-Cruiser
- Name: Cornish Crabber 17

Boat
- Displacement: 1,950 lb (885 kg)
- Draft: 4.00 ft (1.22 m), with centreboard down

Hull
- Type: monohull
- Construction: fibreglass
- LOA: 17.00 ft (5.18 m), with bowsprit 20.00 ft (6.10 m)
- LWL: 16.00 ft (4.88 m)
- Beam: 6.87 ft (2.09 m)
- Engine: outboard motor

Hull appendages
- Keel: centreboard
- Ballast: 217 lb (98 kg)
- Rudder: transom-mounted rudder

Rig
- Rig type: Gaff rig

Sails
- Sailplan: gaff rigged sloop
- Total sail area: 178.00 sq ft (16.537 m^{2})

The Cornish Crabber 17, or just Cornish Crabber, is a British trailerable sailboat that was designed by Roger Dongray as a daysailer and pocket cruiser and first built in 1989.

== Production ==
The design was built by Cornish Crabbers in Wadebridge, Cornwall, United Kingdom starting in 1989, but it is now out of production.

== Design ==
The Cornish Crabber 17 is a recreational sailboat, built predominantly of fibreglass, with wood trim. It is a gaff riged sloop, with a bowsprit, with a plumb stem, a slightly angled transom, a transom-hung rudder controlled by a tiller and a centreboard. It displaces 1,950 lb (885 kg) and carries 380 lb (172 kg) of ballast.

The boat has a draft of 4.00 ft (1.22 m) with the centreboard extended and 1.58 ft (0.48 m) with it retracted, allowing beaching or ground transportation on a trailer.

The boat is normally fitted with a small 2 to 6 hp (1 to 4 kW) outboard motor for docking and manoeuvring, mounted in a transom well.

The design has sleeping accommodation for two people, with two straight settees in the main cabin. There are no galley provisions. The optional head is a portable type. Cabin headroom is 51 in (130 cm) under the fold-down dodger, which includes a zip-up back panel to enclose the below-decks area.

For downwind sailing the design may be equipped with a spinnaker.

The design has a hull speed of 5.4 kn (10.0 km/h).

== Operational history ==
The boat is supported by an active class club, the Cornish Crabbers Club.

In a 2001 review naval architect Robert Perry wrote, "while these boats are attractive, it is difficult to do them justice in a review ... The 17 is a gaff-rigged sloop. Cornish Crabber owners seem to favor tanbark sails. I favor white sails. A small spinnaker is shown. The SA/D is a surprising 22.2. This should move the little hooker along quite well. Draft with the flat plate centerboard down is 4 feet; board-up draft is 1 foot, 7 inches. There is 217 pounds of ballast in the bilge. This is an ideal trailerable boat for a sailor looking for something a little different and is guaranteed to turn heads."

In a 2010 review Steve Henkel wrote, "the Crabber is part of a line of traditional West Cornwall (Eng- land) watercraft recreated in fiberglass and elegantly finished. She's intended mainly as a daysailer but has camping space for two overnight under the fold-down 'spray hood' (dodger) with a zip-in back panel. Best features: Workmanship is outstanding for a boat this size. Foam flotation gives positive buoyancy. Intelligent organization of the very limited space includes a place for a portable head as well as basic overnighting gear (sleeping bags, camp stove, etc). Position of the outboard, in a well amidships and forward of the rudder, provides good steering control in both forward and reverse, and the engine can be removed and stowed in a locker meant for the purpose to eliminate prop drag. With her gaff rig and tan-bark sails, she's pretty as a picture underway. Worst features: Spars are varnished wood, beautiful to look at but a time-consuming maintenance chore. Price of both new and used boats, well above her comp[etitor]s, may not fit everyone's budget ..."

== See also ==
- List of sailing boat types
