= Clark Mills (boatbuilder) =

American boat designer and builder (1915–2001)

Clark Wilbur Mills (1915, Michigan - December 11, 2001, Clearwater Florida) was an American designer and builder of boats.

He was best known as the designer of economical and practical boats such as the Optimist pram, Windmill, Com-Pac 16 and others. He began building boats before World War II and after the war opened the Mills Boat Works in Clearwater, Florida.

Mills was inducted into the National Sailing Hall of Fame in 2017.

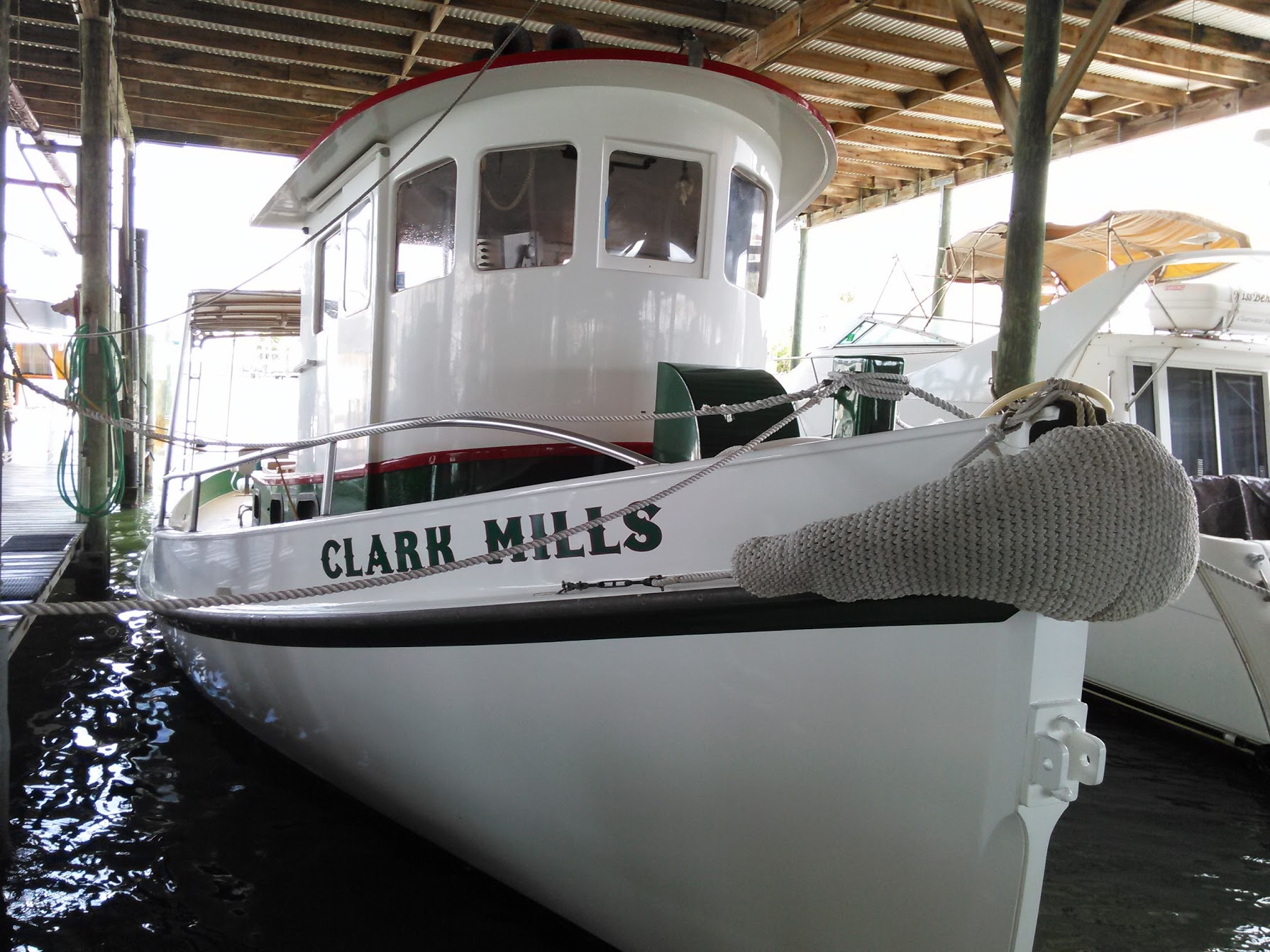
Clark Mills Tugboat in 2017, built by Clark Mills in 1972

== Designs ==
- Com-Pac 16
- Com-Pac 23
- Com-Pac Sun Cat
- Com-Pac Sunday Cat
- Optimist
- US1
- Windmill
