= Sanibel 18 =

1980s US recreational keelboat

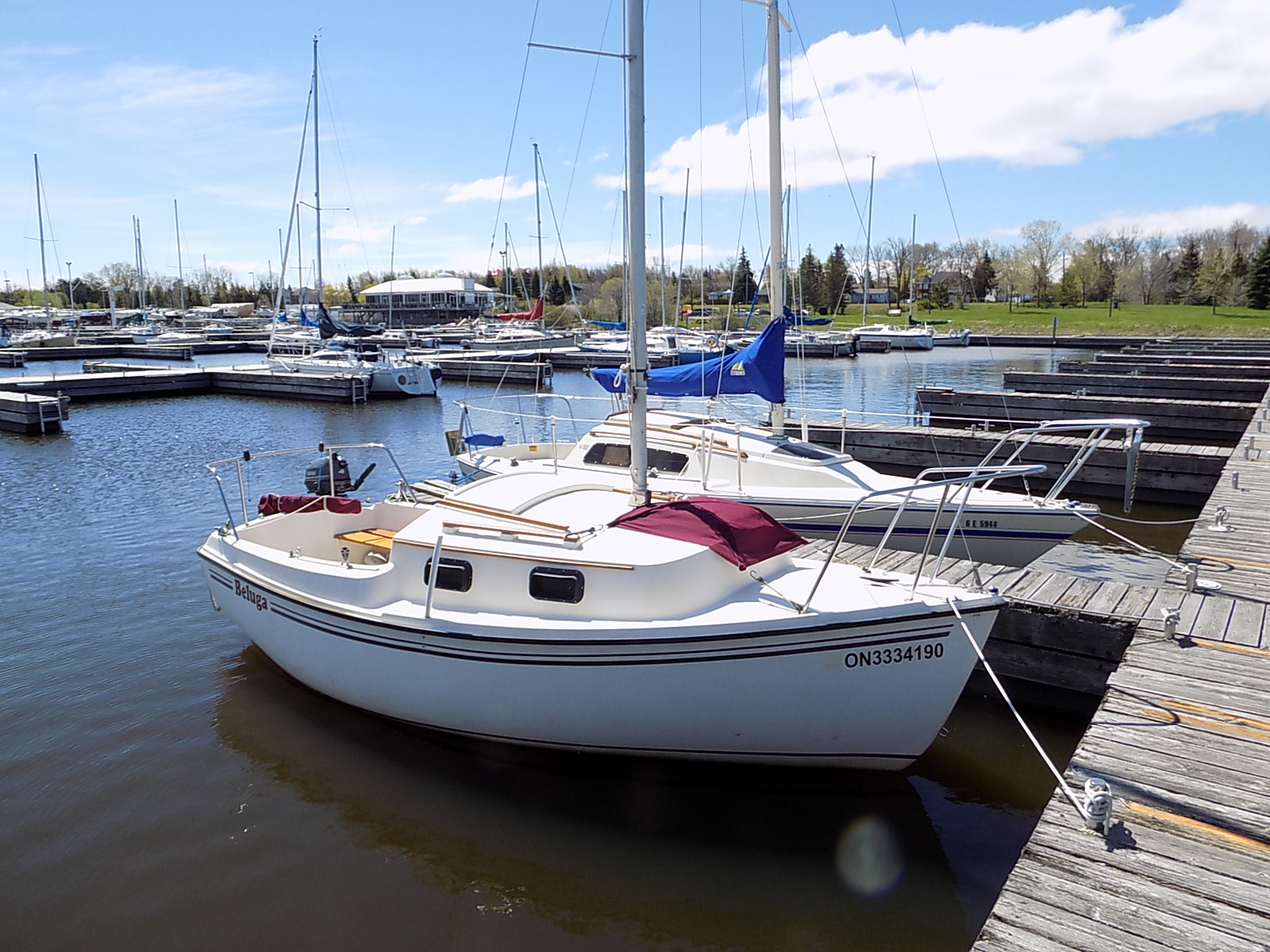

Development
- Designer: Charles Ludwig
- Location: United States
- Year: 1985
- No. built: 169 by International Marine
- Builders: Southern Sails; Commodore Yacht Corporation; Captiva Yachts; Leisure-Time Fiberglass Products; International Marine
- Name: Sanibel 18

Boat
- Displacement: 1,369 lb (621 kg)
- Draft: 4.00 ft (1.22 m) with centerboard down

Hull
- Type: Monohull
- Construction: Fiberglass
- LOA: 17.88 ft (5.45 m)
- LWL: 15.06 ft (4.59 m)
- Beam: 7.80 ft (2.38 m)
- Engine: Outboard motor

Hull appendages
- Keel: centerboard
- Ballast: 450 lb (204 kg)
- Rudder: transom-mounted rudder

Rig
- General: Fractional rigged sloop
- I foretriangle height: 18.80 ft (5.73 m)
- J foretriangle base: 8.30 ft (2.53 m)
- P mainsail luff: 20.00 ft (6.10 m)
- E mainsail foot: 9.20 ft (2.80 m)

Sails
- Mainsail area: 92.00 sq ft (8.547 m^{2})
- Jib/genoa area: 78.02 sq ft (7.248 m^{2})
- Total sail area: 170.02 sq ft (15.795 m^{2})

The Sanibel 18 is a recreational keelboat first built in 1982 and named for the Floridian town and island.

The boat was built by a series of different builders under several different model names in the United States, and all are now out of production.

== Design ==
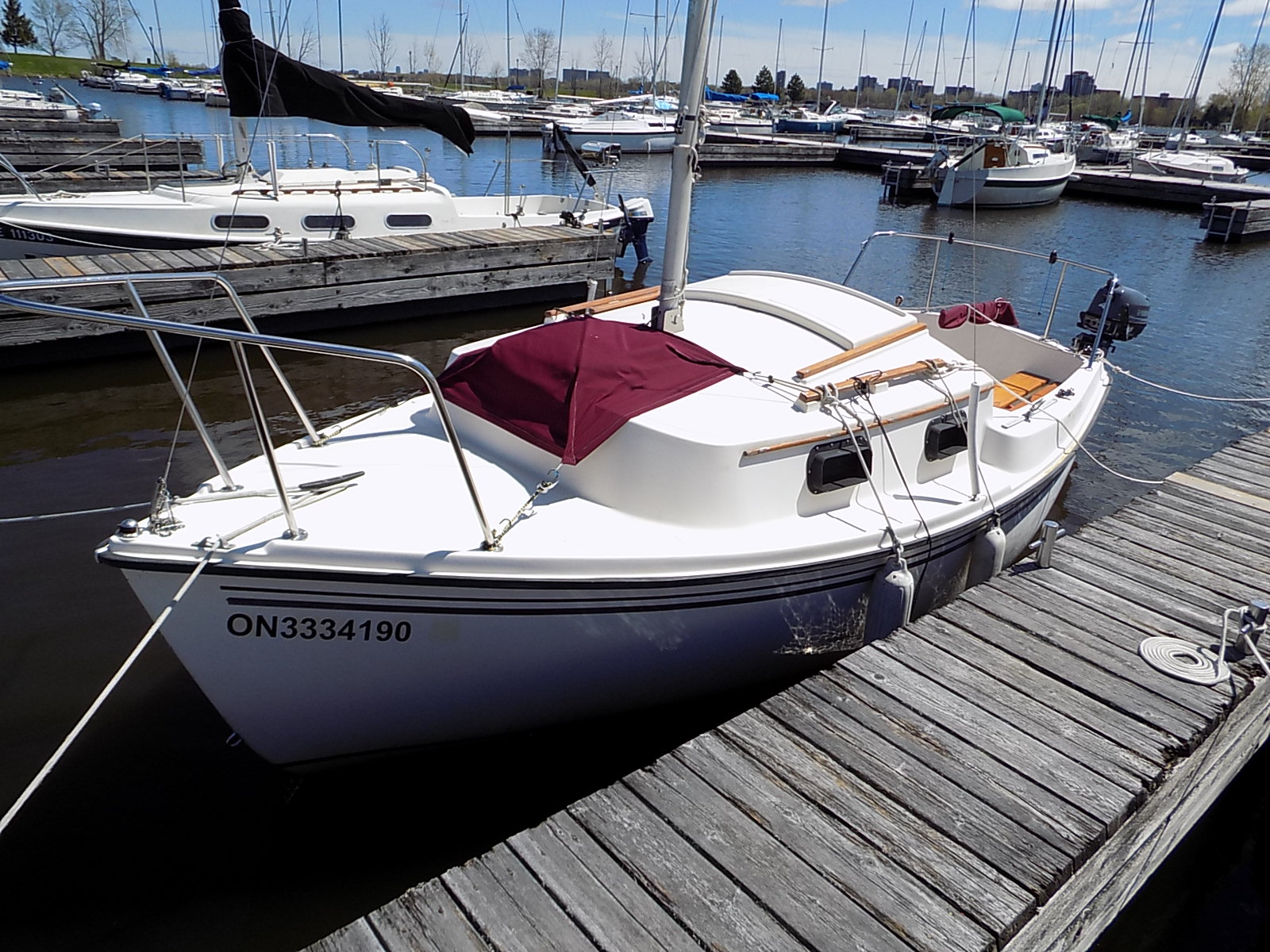
Sanibel 18

The series are all small recreational keelboats, built predominantly of fiberglass, with wood trim. They have fractional sloop rigs, transom-hung rudders and retractable centerboards. They are normally fitted with a small 2 to 5 hp (1 to 4 kW) outboard motor for docking and maneuvering.

The design has sleeping accommodation for three people, with a double "V"-berth in the bow and a straight settee in the main cabin. Cabin headroom is 54 in (137 cm).

== Variants ==
Skipper's Mate 17
This model was introduced in 1982 and was built by Southern Sails until 1984. It has a length overall of 17.17 ft (5.2 m), a waterline length of 15.00 ft (4.6 m), displaces 1,200 lb (544 kg) and carries 250 lb (113 kg) of ballast. The boat has a draft of 3.00 ft (0.91 m) with the centerboard down and 1.00 ft (0.30 m) with it up. The boat has a hull speed of 5.19 kn (9.61 km/h).

Commodore 17
This model was introduced in 1984 and was built by the Commodore Yacht Corporation until 1985. It has a length overall of 17.17 ft (5.2 m), a waterline length of 15.00 ft (4.6 m), displaces 1,200 lb (544 kg) and carries 250 lb (113 kg) of ballast. The boat has a draft of 3.00 ft (0.91 m) with the centerboard down and 1.00 ft (0.30 m) with it up. The boat has a hull speed of 5.19 kn (9.61 km/h).

Sanibel 17 and 18
The Sanibel 17 was introduced in 1985 and was built by Captiva Yachts and later by International Marine. It was renamed the Sanibel 18 in 1986; the cockpit seat were raised to add knee room in the cabin berths and three raised pads were added to the cabin top for a single teak rail. The cabin top rail is the easiest way to identify a 17 versus 18. A total of 169 examples were completed between 1985 and 1988. It has a length overall of 17.88 ft (5.4 m), a waterline length of 15.06 ft (4.6 m), displaces 1,369 lb (621 kg) and carries 450 lb (204 kg) of ballast. The boat has a draft of 4.00 ft (1.22 m) with the centerboard down and 1.00 ft (0.30 m) with it up. The boat has a hull speed of 5.2 kn (9.63 km/h).

Snug Harbor 18
This model was introduced in 1990 and was built by Leisure-Time Fiberglass Products, although very few were built. The molds were made by using an existing Sanibel 18 boat hull as a fiberglass mold plug. It has a length overall of 17.83 ft (5.4 m), a waterline length of 15.00 ft (4.6 m), displaces 1,300 lb (590 kg) and carries 400 lb (181 kg) of ballast. The boat has a draft of 4.00 ft (1.22 m) with the centerboard down and 1.00 ft (0.30 m) with it up. The boat has a hull speed of 5.19 kn (9.61 km/h).
