= Hunter 19-1 =

Sailboat class

Development
- Designer: Hunter Design Team
- Location: United States
- Year: 1981
- Builder: Hunter Marine
- Name: Hunter 19-1

Boat
- Displacement: 1,250 lb (567 kg)
- Draft: 4.50 ft (1.37 m)

Hull
- Type: Monohull
- Construction: Fiberglass
- LOA: 18.67 ft (5.69 m)
- LWL: 14.58 ft (4.44 m)
- Beam: 7.33 ft (2.23 m)
- Engine: Outboard motor

Hull appendages
- Keel: centerboard
- Rudder: transom-mounted rudder

Rig
- Rig type: Bermuda rig
- I foretriangle height: 21.00 ft (6.40 m)
- J foretriangle base: 6.50 ft (1.98 m)
- P mainsail luff: 21.00 ft (6.40 m)
- E mainsail foot: 8.33 ft (2.54 m)

Sails
- Sailplan: Fractional rigged sloop
- Mainsail area: 87.47 sq ft (8.126 m^{2})
- Jib/genoa area: 68.25 sq ft (6.341 m^{2})
- Total sail area: 155.72 sq ft (14.467 m^{2})

The Hunter 19-1 is an American trailerable sailboat that was designed as a day sailer and small cruising sailboat by the Hunter Design Team and first built in 1981.

The design was originally marketed by the manufacturer as the Hunter 19, but is now usually referred to as the Hunter 19-1 to differentiate it from the unrelated 1993 Hunter 19-2 design, which was also sold as the Hunter 19.

== Production ==
The design was built by Hunter Marine in the United States between 1981 and 1983, but it is now out of production.

== Design ==
The Hunter 19-1 is a recreational keelboat, built predominantly of fiberglass, with wood trim. It has a fractional sloop rig, a raked stem, a slightly reverse transom, a transom-hung rudder controlled by a tiller and a centerboard. It displaces 1,250 lb (567 kg).

The boat has a draft of 4.50 ft (1.37 m) with the centreboard extended and 0.58 ft (0.18 m) with it retracted, allowing beaching or ground transportation on a trailer.

The boat is normally fitted with a small outboard motor for docking and maneuvering. The design features a self-bailing cockpit, built-in outboard engine mount, a portable toilet and a cooler.

The design has a hull speed of 5.12 kn (9.48 km/h).

== See also ==
- List of sailing boat types

Related development

- Hunter 19-2

Similar sailboats

- Buccaneer 200
- Cal 20
- Catalina 18
- Drascombe Lugger
- Edel 540
- Hunter 18.5
- Hunter 19 (Europa)
- Mercury 18
- Mistral T-21
- Naiad 18
- Paceship 20
- Sandpiper 565
- Sanibel 18
- San Juan 21
- Siren 17
- Typhoon 18
