= Hunter 19 (Europa) =

Sailboat class

Development
- Designer: Oliver Lee
- Location: United Kingdom
- Year: 1972
- Builder: Hunter Boats Limited
- Name: Hunter 19 (Europa)

Boat
- Displacement: 1,501 lb (681 kg)
- Draft: 2.99 ft (0.91 m)

Hull
- Type: Monohull
- Construction: Fibreglass
- LOA: 18.96 ft (5.78 m)
- LWL: 17.19 ft (5.24 m)
- Beam: 6.14 ft (1.87 m)
- Engine: Outboard motor

Hull appendages
- Keel: fin keel
- Ballast: 750 lb (340 kg)
- Rudder: transom-mounted rudder

Rig
- Rig type: Bermuda rig

Sails
- Sailplan: Masthead sloop
- Total sail area: 152.00 sq ft (14.121 m^{2})

The Hunter 19 (Europa) is a British sailboat that was designed by Oliver Lee and first built in 1972.

The design was originally marketed by the manufacturer as the Hunter 19, but is now usually referred to as the Hunter 19 (Europa) to differentiate it from the unrelated American Hunter Marine 1981 Hunter 19-1 and 1993 Hunter 19-2 designs, which were both also sold as the Hunter 19.

== Production ==
The design was built by Hunter Boats Limited in the United Kingdom between 1972 and 1982, but it is now out of production.

== Design ==
The Hunter 19 (Europa) is a development of the Squib, with a cabin added. After 1974 it was known as the Europa 19 or the Hunter Europa. It is a small recreational keelboat, built predominantly of fibreglass, with wood trim. It has a masthead sloop rig, a raked stem, a reverse transom, a transom-hung rudder controlled by a tiller and a fixed fin keel. It displaces 1,501 lb (681 kg) and carries 750 lb (340 kg) of fixed ballast.

The boat has a draft of 2.99 ft (0.91 m) with the standard fin keel fitted and 2.23 ft (0.68 m) with the optional shoal draft keel.

The boat is optionally fitted with a small outboard motor for docking and maneuvering.

The design has a hull speed of 5.56 kn (10.30 km/h).

== See also ==
- List of sailing boat types

Similar sailboats

- Buccaneer 200
- Cal 20
- Catalina 18
- Drascombe Lugger
- Edel 540
- Hunter 18.5
- Hunter 19-1
- Mercury 18
- Mistral T-21
- Naiad 18
- Paceship 20
- Sandpiper 565
- Sanibel 18
- San Juan 21
- Sirius 22
- Typhoon 18
