= Hunter 18.5 =

Sailboat class

Development
- Designer: Hunter Design Team
- Location: United States
- Year: 1987
- Builder: Hunter Marine
- Name: Hunter 18.5

Boat
- Displacement: 1,600 lb (726 kg)
- Draft: 2.00 ft (0.61 m)

Hull
- Type: Monohull
- Construction: Fiberglass
- LOA: 18.42 ft (5.61 m)
- LWL: 15.50 ft (4.72 m)
- Beam: 7.08 ft (2.16 m)
- Engine: Outboard motor

Hull appendages
- Keel: wing keel
- Ballast: 520 lb (236 kg)
- Rudder: transom-mounted rudder

Rig
- Rig type: Bermuda rig
- I foretriangle height: 21.42 ft (6.53 m)
- J foretriangle base: 6.46 ft (1.97 m)
- P mainsail luff: 21.00 ft (6.40 m)
- E mainsail foot: 7.92 ft (2.41 m)

Sails
- Sailplan: Fractional rigged sloop
- Mainsail area: 83.16 sq ft (7.726 m^{2})
- Jib/genoa area: 69.19 sq ft (6.428 m^{2})
- Total sail area: 152.35 sq ft (14.154 m^{2})

Racing
- PHRF: 288 (average)

The Hunter 18.5 is an American trailerable sailboat that was designed by the Hunter Design Team as a cruising sailboat and first built in 1987.

== Production ==
The design was built by Hunter Marine in the United States between 1987 and 1993, but it is now out of production.

== Design ==
The Hunter 18.5 is a small recreational keelboat, built predominantly of fiberglass, with wood trim. It has a fractional sloop rig with a fully battened mainsail, a raked stem, a reverse transom, a transom-hung kick-up rudder controlled by a tiller and a fixed wing keel. It displaces 1,600 lb (726 kg) and carries 520 lb (236 kg) of ballast.

The boat has a draft of 2.00 ft (0.61 m) with the standard shoal-draft wing keel, allowing ground transportation on the factory standard trailer.

The boat is optionally fitted with a small 3 to 6 hp (2 to 4 kW) outboard motor for docking and maneuvering. Other factory optional equipment included a portable head, galley alcohol stove, water pump tap, cooler and anchor.

The design has sleeping accommodation for three people, with a double "V"-berth in the bow cabin and a straight settee in the main cabin on the port side. Cabin headroom is 48 in (122 cm).

The design has a PHRF racing average handicap of 288. It has a hull speed of 5.28 kn (9.78 km/h).

== Operational history ==
In a 2010 review Steve Henkel wrote, "in the late 1980s, Hunter Marine expanded their cruising, boat line into smaller sizes. They also redesigned the line with a more 'modern' look. The Hunter 18.5 was one of the first of Hunter's minicruisers to be introduced. Unique features include a very shallow (two-foot draft) keel with both a bulb and 'winglets.' Best features: Headroom of four feet is exceptional for a boat of this size ... Ballast is also highest for the group ... Worst features: The keel is too shallow, and has too small a lateral area, to expect even so-so upwind sailing performance, with or without the winglets (which we suspect are too small to serve any real purpose). The full-length battens make it difficult to 'read' the trim of the mainsail, The flip-up rudder, being deeper than the keel, is thus unprotected and therefore subject to damage or loss if a sudden shoal water situation is encountered and the flip-up mechanism isn't ready for it."

== See also ==
- List of sailing boat types

Similar sailboats

- Alacrity 19
- Buccaneer 200
- Cal 20
- Catalina 18
- Drascombe Lugger
- Edel 540
- Mistral T-21
- Naiad 18
- Paceship 20
- Sandpiper 565
- Sanibel 18
- San Juan 21
- Siren 17
- Typhoon 18
