= Mercury 18 =

Sailboat class

Development
- Designer: Ernest Nunes
- Location: United States
- Year: 1939
- No. built: 1060 (1994)
- Builders: Ernest Nunes; W. D. Schock Corp; Moore Sailboats
- Role: One-design racer
- Name: Mercury 18

Boat
- Crew: two
- Displacement: 1,100 lb (499 kg)
- Draft: 3.08 ft (0.94 m)

Hull
- Type: Monohull
- Construction: Plywood or fiberglass
- LOA: 18.00 ft (5.49 m)
- LWL: 13.00 ft (3.96 m)
- Beam: 5.33 ft (1.62 m)

Hull appendages
- Keel: fin keel
- Ballast: 635 lb (288 kg)
- Rudder: keel-mounted rudder

Rig
- Rig type: Bermuda rig
- I foretriangle height: 18.40 ft (5.61 m)
- J foretriangle base: 7.30 ft (2.23 m)
- P mainsail luff: 21.92 ft (6.68 m)
- E mainsail foot: 9.08 ft (2.77 m)

Sails
- Sailplan: Fractional rigged sloop
- Mainsail area: 99.52 sq ft (9.246 m^{2})
- Jib/genoa area: 67.16 sq ft (6.239 m^{2})
- Total sail area: 166.68 sq ft (15.485 m^{2})

The Mercury 18, sometimes just referred to as a Mercury, is an American sailboat that was designed by Ernest Nunes as a one design racer and first built in 1939. The boat was one of the first one-design sailboat classes designed for plywood construction.

The design is sometimes confused with the unrelated Sparkman & Stephens 1940 Cape Cod Mercury design.

== Production ==
The design was built in the United States by Ernest Nunes, W. D. Schock Corp originally in Corona, California and later in Santa Ana, California and Moore Sailboats in Watsonville, California. By 1994 a total of 1,060 boats had been completed, but it is now out of production.

W. D. Schock Corp records indicate that they built 21 boats between 1963 and 1967.

At one point plans and also unfinished fiberglass hulls were available for amateur construction.

== Design ==
The Mercury 18 is a recreational keelboat, originally built predominantly of plywood and, starting in 1952, from fiberglass with wood trim. It has a fractional sloop rig with wooden or aluminum spars. The single chined hull has a spooned raked stem, a raised counter transom, a keel-hung rudder controlled by a tiller and a fixed long keel. It displaces 1,100 lb (499 kg) and carries 635 lb (288 kg) of lead ballast built into the keel.

The boat has a draft of 3.08 ft (0.94 m) with the standard keel.

For sailing the design is equipped with two jumper stays, the topmost or which is angled forward, plus a backstay. Flotation is not required by the class rules, but Personal flotation devices, bilge pumps and additional safety equipment is required to be carried for racing.

The design is normally raced with a crew of two sailors.

== Operational history ==
The design is supported by an active US west coast type club, the Mercury Class, that organizes racing.

In a 1994 review Richard Sherwood wrote, "this classic-design, full-keel sloop is usually found in the [United States] Northeast or on the West Coast."

== See also ==
- List of sailing boat types

Similar sailboats

- Buccaneer 200
- Catalina 18
- COM-PAC 19
- Com-Pac Sunday Cat
- Cornish Shrimper 19
- Drascombe Lugger
- Hunter 19-1
- Hunter 19 (Europa)
- Naiad 18
- Nordica 16
- Sanibel 18
- Sandpiper 565
- Siren 17
- Typhoon 18
- West Wight Potter 19
