= Cal 20 =

Sailboat class

Development
- Designer: C. William Lapworth
- Location: United States
- Year: 1961
- No. built: 1,945
- Builders: Cal Yachts; Calgan Marine
- Name: Cal 20

Boat
- Displacement: 1,950 lb (885 kg)
- Draft: 3.33 ft (1.01 m)

Hull
- Type: Monohull
- Construction: Fiberglass
- LOA: 20.00 ft (6.10 m)
- LWL: 18.00 ft (5.49 m)
- Beam: 7.00 ft (2.13 m)
- Engine: Outboard motor

Hull appendages
- Keel: fin keel with bulb
- Ballast: 900 lb (408 kg)
- Rudder: transom-mounted rudder

Rig
- General: Fractional rigged sloop
- I foretriangle height: 22.00 ft (6.71 m)
- J foretriangle base: 7.30 ft (2.23 m)
- P mainsail luff: 23.00 ft (7.01 m)
- E mainsail foot: 10.00 ft (3.05 m)

Sails
- Mainsail area: 115.00 sq ft (10.684 m^{2})
- Jib/genoa area: 80.30 sq ft (7.460 m^{2})
- Total sail area: 195.30 sq ft (18.144 m^{2})

Racing
- PHRF: 279 (average)

The Cal 20 is an American sailboat, that was designed by C. William Lapworth and first built in 1961.

== Production ==
The boat was built by Cal Yachts in the United States from 1961 to 1975, but it is now out of production.

The Cal 20 was seen by Canadian Al Nairne during a visit to California. Nairne convinced Jack Jensen of Jensen Marine to allow him to produce the Cal 20 under licence in Canada and formed Calgan Marine in North Vancouver for that purpose. Calgan Marine went on to produce many Cal Yachts designs, plus designs of its own.

A total of 1,945 Cal 20s were built during its 14-year production run.

== Design ==
The Cal 20 is a small recreational keelboat, built predominantly of fiberglass. It has a fractional sloop rig, a transom-hung rudder and a fixed fin keel with a weighted bulb. It displaces 1,950 lb (885 kg) and carries 900 lb (408 kg) of ballast.

The boat has a draft of 3.33 ft (1.01 m) with the standard keel fitted and is normally fitted with a small outboard motor for docking and maneuvering.

The boat has a PHRF racing average handicap of 279 with a high of 291 and low of 270. It has a hull speed of 5.69 kn (10.54 km/h).

== Operational history ==
In a 2010 review Steve Henkel wrote, "best features: She is fast and easy to sail. A 46% B/D ratio, with a bulb keel concentrating her ballast low, gives her good stability. An outboard well located in the cockpit keeps the engine under the helmsman’s control. And for those looking for camaraderie, the big network of Cal 20 fleets (largely on the West Coast) will be attractive. Worst features: Fin keel with bulb makes the boat a chore to launch at shallow ramps. Also, the boats are among the oldest fiberglass boats around, and most will require more strenuous than ordinary maintenance to keep in top condition. The keel (made of iron, which rusts), keel bolts, and surrounding fiberglass are common causes of concern."

== See also ==
- List of sailing boat types

Similar sailboats

- Buccaneer 200
- Core Sound 20 Mark 3
- Flicka 20
- Halman 20
- Hunter 18.5
- Hunter 19-1
- Hunter 19 (Europa)
- Hunter 20
- Mistral T-21
- Paceship 20
- Sandpiper 565
- San Juan 21
- Santana 20
- Sirius 22
