= Core Sound 20 Mark 3 =

Sailboat class

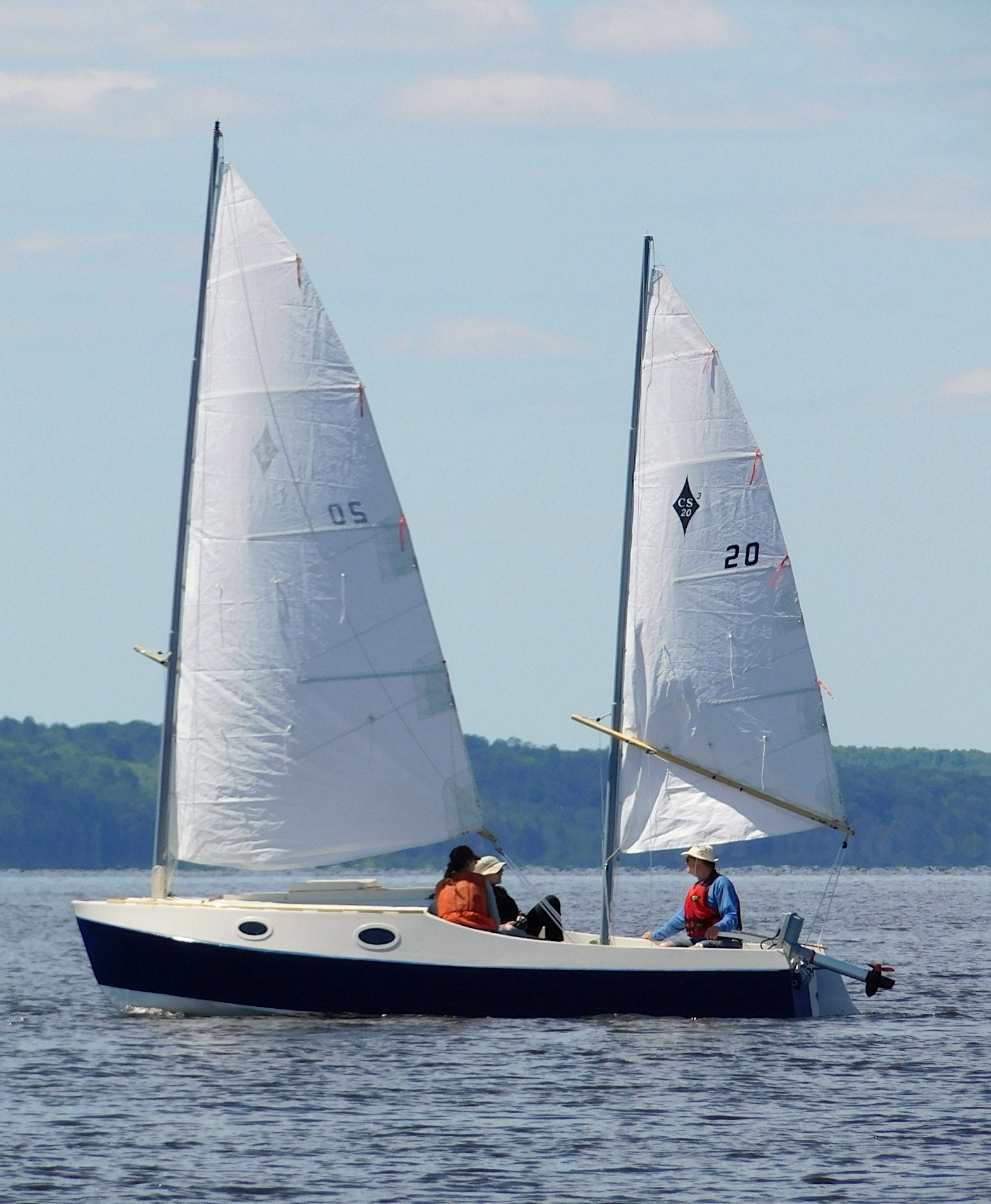

Development
- Designer: B&B Yacht Designs
- Location: United States
- Year: 2014
- Builder: Amateur builders
- Role: Cruiser
- Name: Core Sound 20 Mark 3

Boat
- Displacement: 1,500 lb (680 kg)
- Draft: 3.93 ft (1.20 m), with centerboard down

Hull
- Type: Monohull
- Construction: Wood
- LOA: 20.00 ft (6.10 m)
- Beam: 6.52 ft (1.99 m)
- Engine: Outboard motor

Hull appendages
- Keel: centerboard
- Ballast: 438 lb (199 kg)
- Rudder: transom-mounted rudder

Rig
- Rig type: cat rigged ketch

Sails
- Sailplan: Ketch
- Total sail area: 180 sq ft (17 m^{2})

The Core Sound 20 Mark 3 is an American sailboat that was designed by B&B Yacht Designs for cruising and first built in 2014. The boat is supplied as a series of kits and plans for amateur construction.

The Core Sound 20 Mark 3 is a development of the Core Sound 20 and is named for the North Carolinian body of water.

== Production ==
The design's kits are supplied by B&B Yacht Designs of Bayboro, North Carolina, United States. The kit includes pre-cut wooden components, cut with a CNC machine. There are individual kits for the hull, portals, centerboard and rudder, masts, sails, rigging and lines, epoxy and fiberglass. Additional wood is required for hull stringers and other parts to complete the boat.

== Design ==
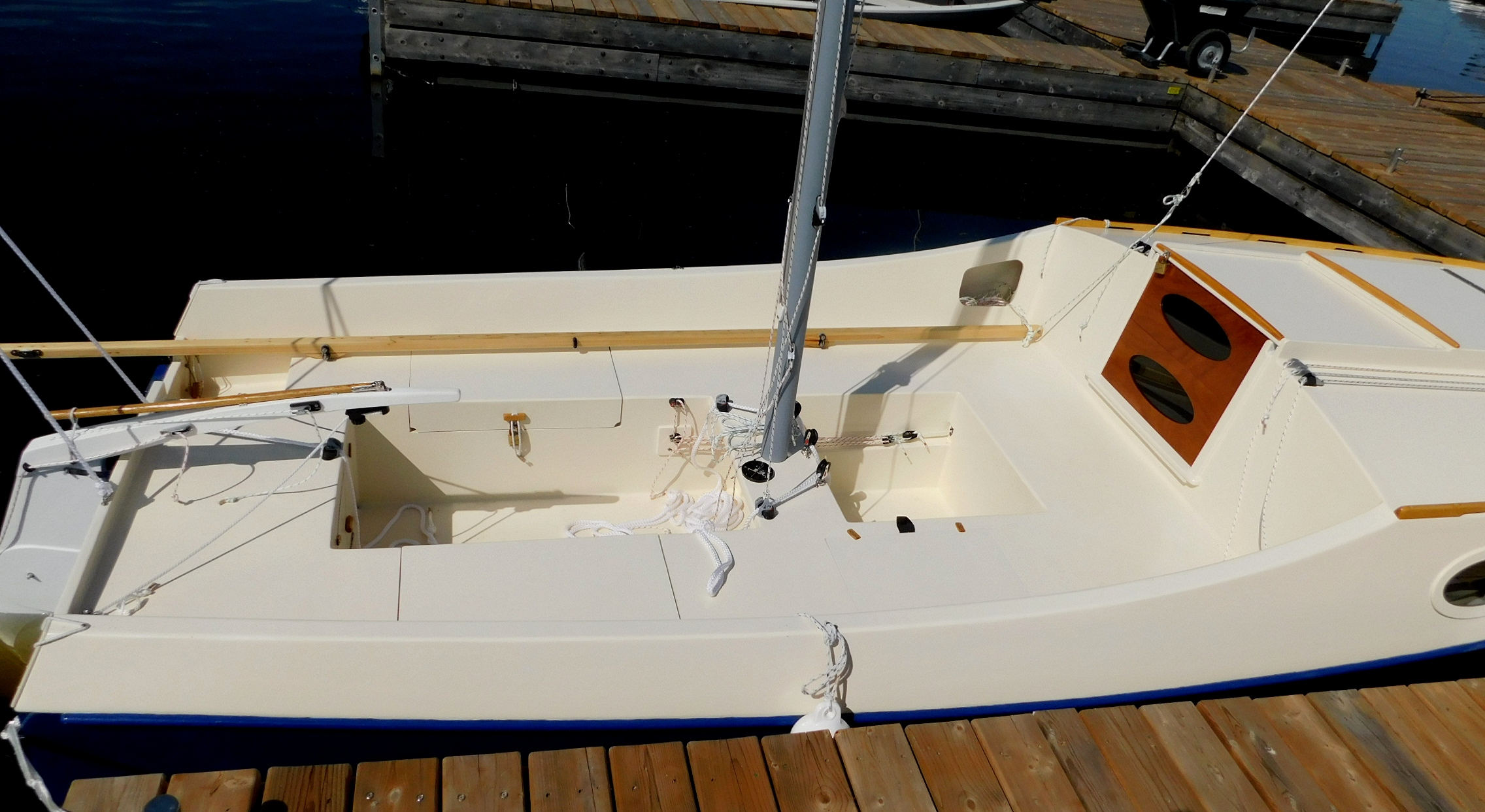
Core Sound 20 Mk 3 cockpit

The Core Sound 20 Mark 3 is a recreational keelboat, built predominantly of stitch and glue 6 mm (0.24 in) okume wood, with two unstayed aluminum masts. It has a loose-footed cat ketch rig with wishbone booms, a slightly raked stem, a plumb transom, a transom-hung rudder controlled by a tiller, a self-draining cockpit and a retractable centerboard keel. It displaces 1,500 lb (680 kg) and carries 17.5 lb (8 kg) of lead ballast in the centerboard tip. The centerboard is of wood, covered with glass cloth and epoxy. It also has a 190 L (50 US gal) flooding water ballast tank, which is drained for road transport.

In 2018, the original design was modified to add a mizzen mast tabernacle to allow easier rigging, as well as greater cabin headroom and simplified construction. The design has provisions for a portable style head.

Earlier versions of the boat have a draft of 3.52 ft (1.07 m) with the centreboard extended and 0.75 ft (0.23 m) with it retracted, allowing beaching or ground transportation on a trailer. Later kits, starting with serial number 20, have a longer centerboard, giving a draft of 3.93 ft (1.20 m).

The boat is normally fitted with a small outboard motor for docking and maneuvering.

== See also ==
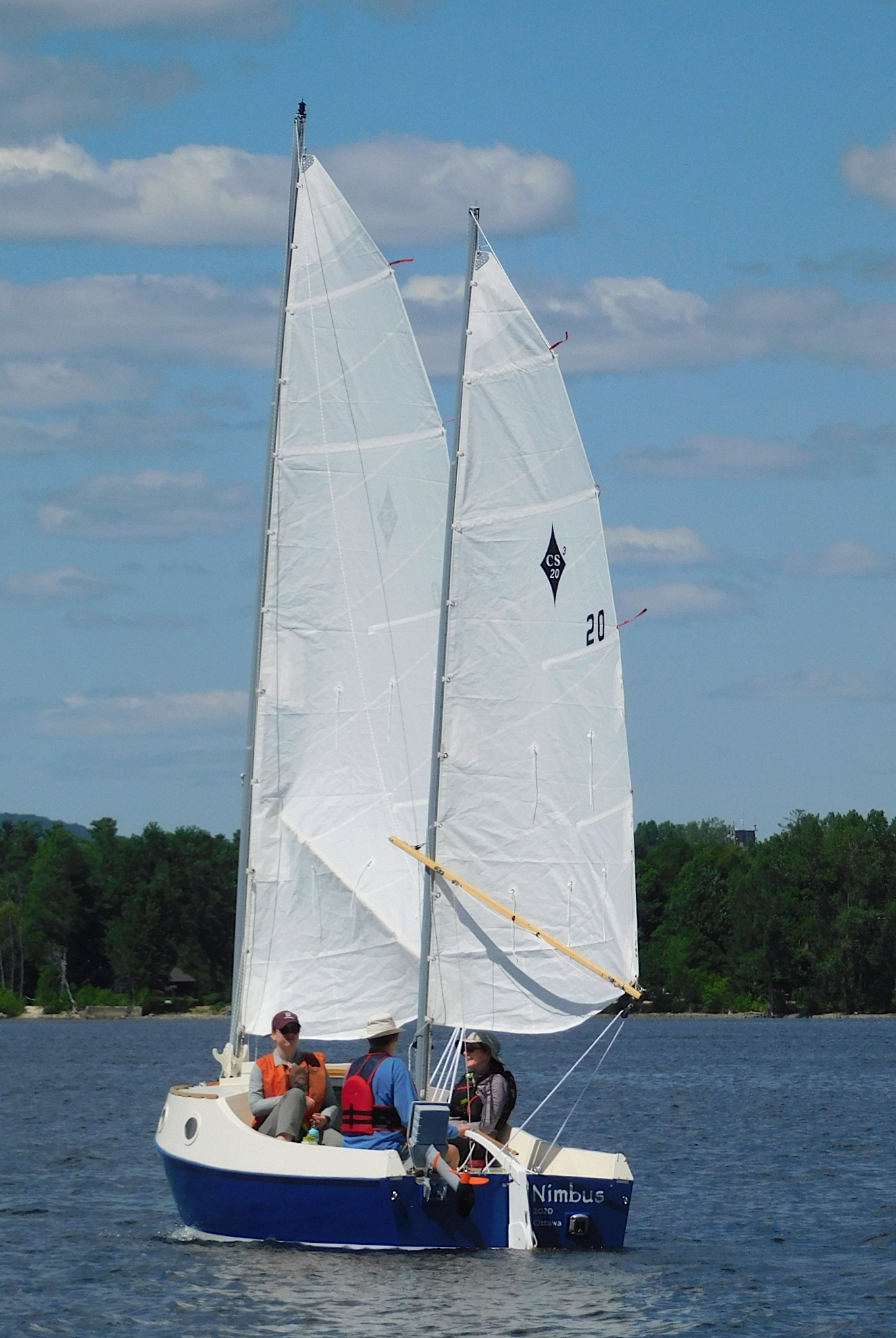
Core Sound 20 Mk 3

- List of sailing boat types

Similar sailboats

- Buccaneer 220
- Cal 20
- Flicka 20
- Halman 20
- Hunter 20
- Mistral T-21
- Paceship 20
- San Juan 21
- Sirius 22
- West Wight Potter 19
