= Halman 20 =

Sailboat class

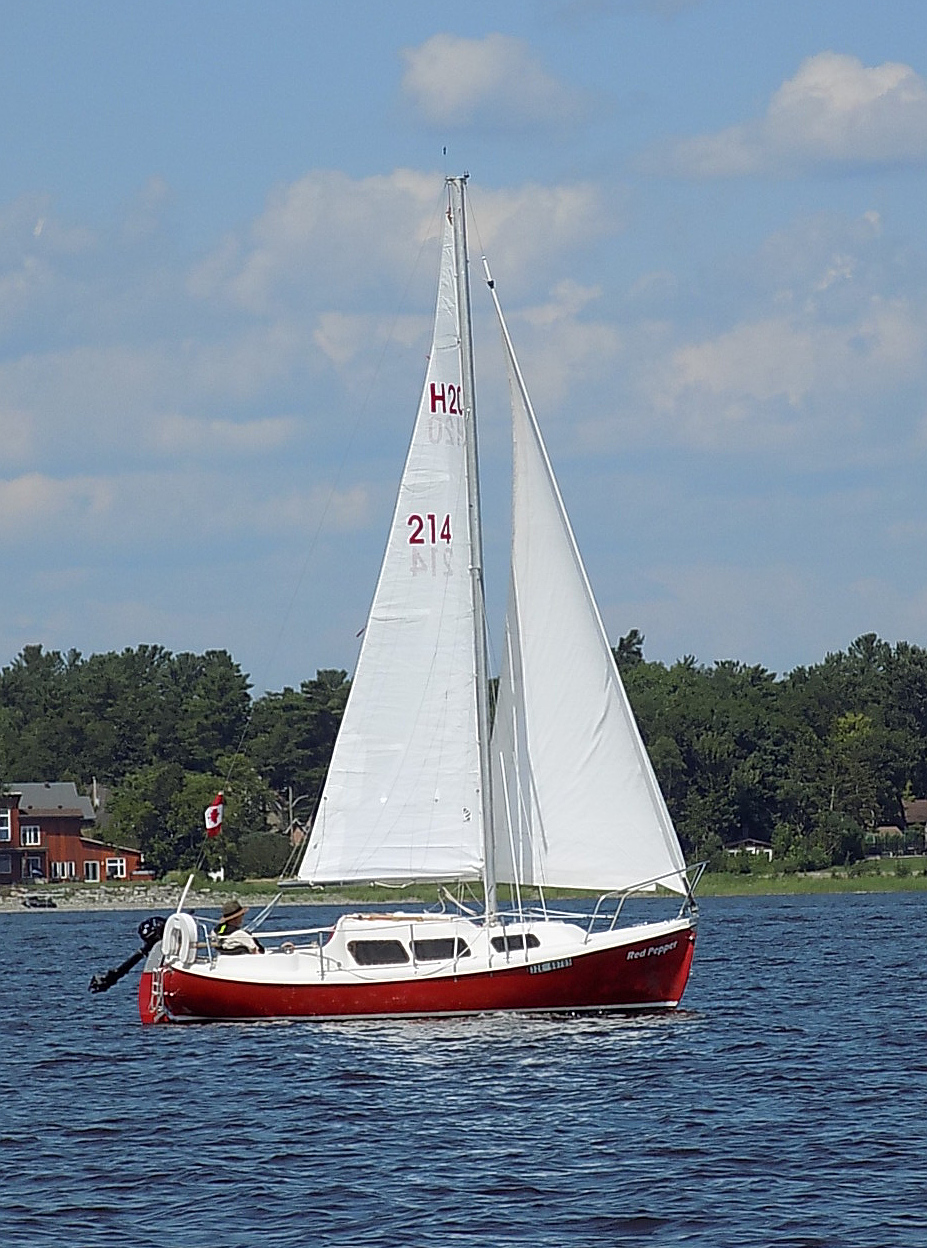

Development
- Location: Canada
- Year: 1977
- Builder: Halman Manufacturing
- Name: Halman 20

Boat
- Displacement: 2,500 lb (1,134 kg)
- Draft: 2.83 ft (0.86 m)

Hull
- Type: Monohull
- Construction: Fiberglass
- LOA: 19.67 ft (6.00 m)
- LWL: 17.08 ft (5.21 m)
- Beam: 7.75 ft (2.36 m)
- Engine: Outboard motor

Hull appendages
- Keel: long keel
- Ballast: 1,000 lb (454 kg)
- Rudder: transom-mounted rudder

Rig
- General: Masthead sloop
- I foretriangle height: 26.50 ft (8.08 m)
- J foretriangle base: 6.70 ft (2.04 m)
- P mainsail luff: 22.10 ft (6.74 m)
- E mainsail foot: 8.17 ft (2.49 m)

Sails
- Mainsail area: 90.28 sq ft (8.387 m^{2})
- Jib/genoa area: 88.78 sq ft (8.248 m^{2})
- Total sail area: 179.05 sq ft (16.634 m^{2})

Racing
- PHRF: 276 (average)

The Halman 20 is a Canadian trailerable sailboat, that was first built in 1977.

The design is thought to be a development of the Nordica 20, but was constructed with new tooling.

== Production ==
The boat was built by Halman Manufacturing in Beamsville, Ontario, Canada, starting in 1977, but it is now out of production.

== Design ==
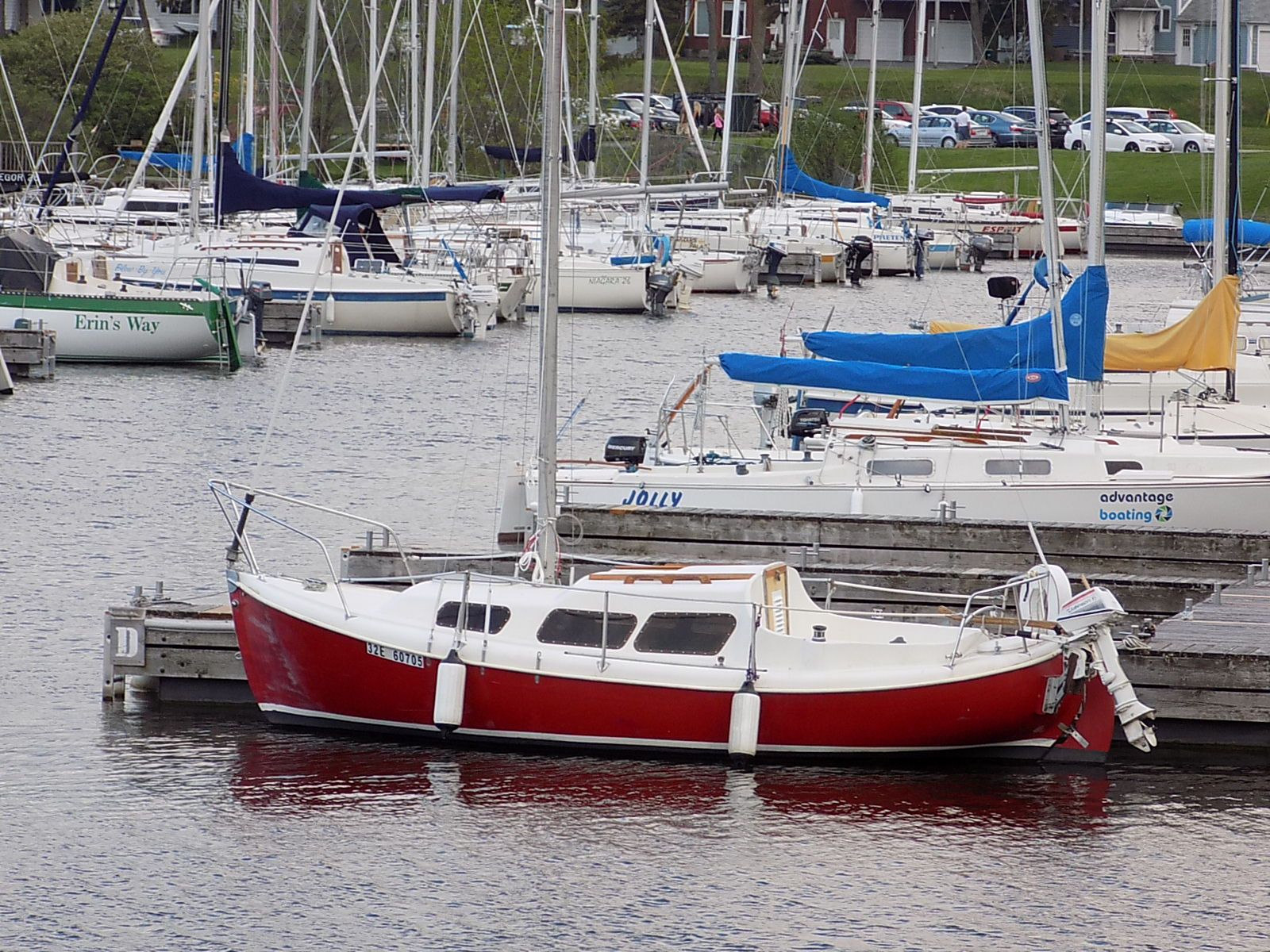
Halman 20

The Halman 20 is a small recreational keelboat, built predominantly of fiberglass, with wood trim. It has a masthead sloop rig, a transom-hung rudder and a fixed long keel. It displaces 2,500 lb (1,134 kg) and carries 1,000 lb (454 kg) of ballast.

The design has a draft of 2.83 ft (0.86 m) with the standard keel and is normally fitted with a small 3 to 6 hp (2 to 4 kW) outboard motor for docking and maneuvering.

The design has sleeping accommodation for four people, with a double "V"-berth in the bow cabin and two a straight settee berths in the main cabin. The galley is located on the starboard side just aft of the bow cabin. Cabin headroom is 60 in (152 cm).

The boat has a PHRF racing average handicap of 276 and a hull speed of 5.4 kn (10.00 km/h).

== Operational history ==
In a review Michael McGoldrick wrote, "unlike many boats under 20 feet in length, the Halman will generally come well equipped with lifelines, winches, and other gear. Its cabin has 5 feet of standing headroom and it is remarkably roomy for a 20 footer, although some of this space was achieved at the expense of a smaller cockpit."

In a 2010 review Steve Henkel wrote, "Best features ... the doghouse is raised a bit more than on the Nordica [20], giving an extra six inches of headroom on the Halman. The beamy hulls give good space below. Worst features: Compared to the heavier, narrower Corinthian [20], a comp, both the Halman and the Nordica can be expected to be slower, especially in light air, due to their higher wetted surface. And neither the Halman nor the Nordica can match the sailing performance of the other comp, the centerboarder Quickstep 21, with her two-foot longer waterline, bigger sail area, and deeper draft with her board down."

== See also ==
- List of sailing boat types

Related development

- Halman Horizon
- Nordica 20

Similar sailboats

- Buccaneer 220
- Cal 20
- Core Sound 20 Mark 3
- Flicka 20
- Hunter 20
- Mistral T-21
- Nordica 16
- Paceship 20
- San Juan 21
- Santana 20
- Sirius 22
- West Wight Potter 19
