= Buccaneer 200 =

Sailboat class

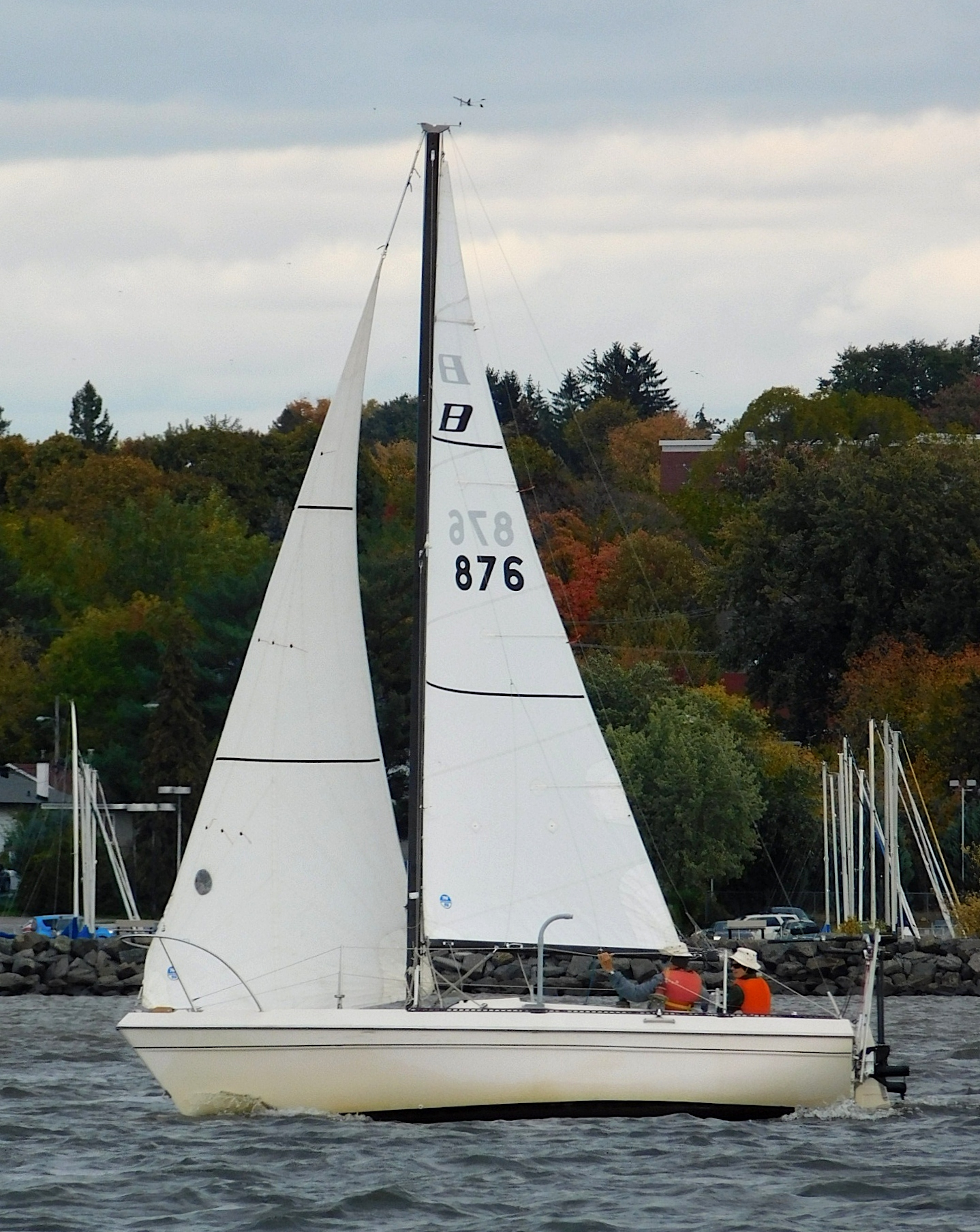

Development
- Designer: Alan Payne
- Location: United States
- Year: 1974
- Builder: Bayliner
- Name: Buccaneer 200

Boat
- Displacement: 2,100 lb (953 kg)
- Draft: 17.33 ft (5.28 m)

Hull
- Type: Monohull
- Construction: Fiberglass
- LOA: 20.42 ft (6.22 m)
- LWL: 17.33 ft (5.28 m)
- Beam: 8.00 ft (2.44 m)
- Engine: Outboard motor

Hull appendages
- Keel: long keel
- Ballast: 750 lb (340 kg)
- Rudder: transom-mounted rudder

Rig
- General: Masthead sloop
- I foretriangle height: 25.80 ft (7.86 m)
- J foretriangle base: 7.60 ft (2.32 m)
- P mainsail luff: 22.00 ft (6.71 m)
- E mainsail foot: 8.30 ft (2.53 m)

Sails
- Mainsail area: 91.30 sq ft (8.482 m^{2})
- Jib/genoa area: 98.04 sq ft (9.108 m^{2})
- Total sail area: 189.34 sq ft (17.590 m^{2})

Racing
- PHRF: 276 (average)

The Buccaneer 200 is an American trailerable sailboat, that was designed by Alan Payne and first built in 1974.

The Buccaneer 200 is a development of the Columbia T-23 design, using the same tooling to build the hull.

== Production ==
The boat was built by Bayliner Marine Corporation in the United States starting in 1974, but it is now out of production.

== Design ==
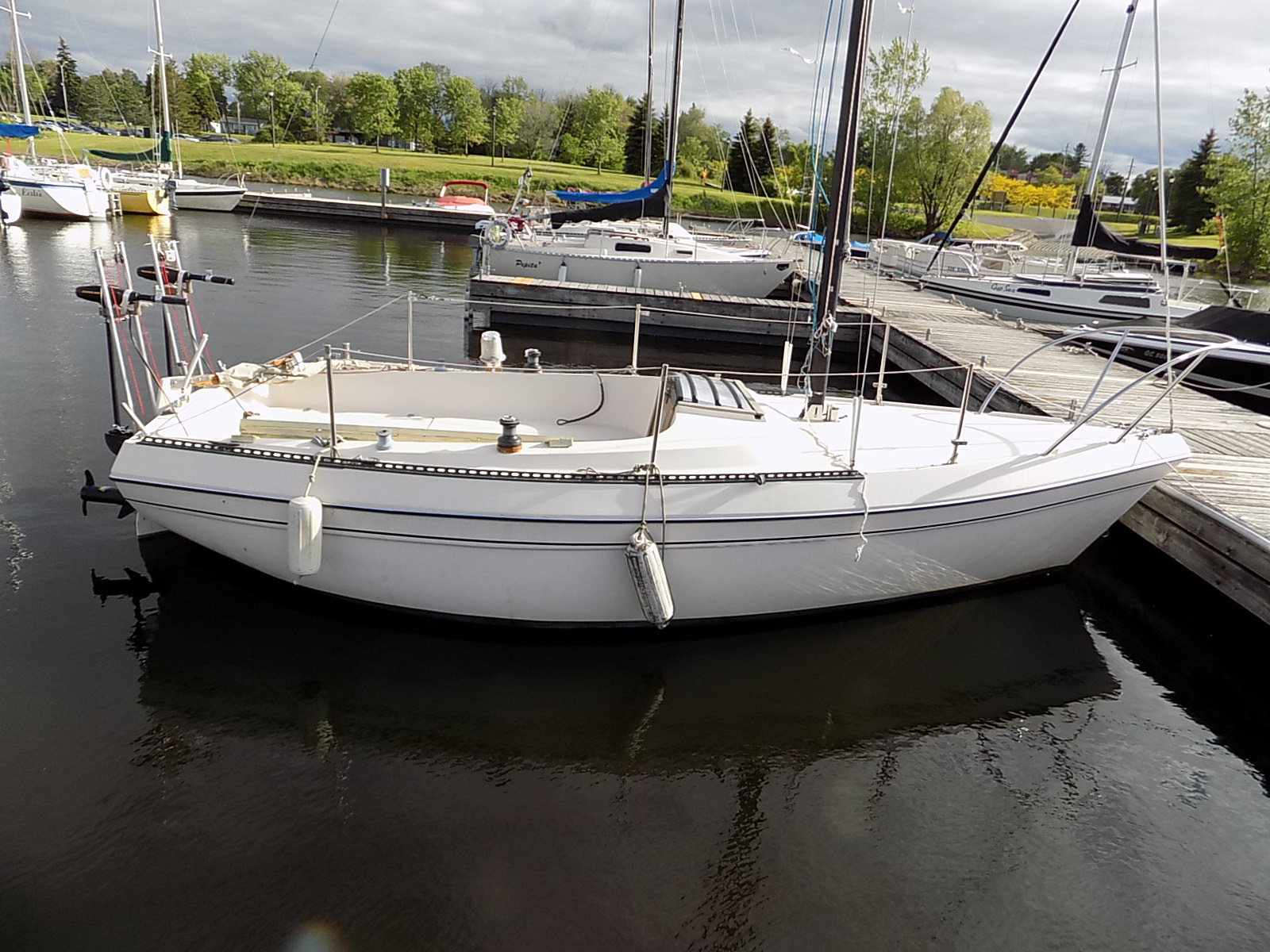
Buccaneer 200 with dual electric Minn Kota motors

The Buccaneer 200 is a small recreational keelboat, built predominantly of fiberglass, with wood trim. It has a masthead sloop rig, a transom-hung rudder and a fixed long shoal-draft keel. It displaces 2,100 lb (953 kg) and carries 750 lb (340 kg) of ballast.

The boat has a draft of 1.75 ft (0.53 m) with the standard keel, allowing beaching or ground transportation on a trailer. It is normally fitted with a small outboard motor for docking and maneuvering. The cabin is small but includes a double berth, a quarter berth, galley with a sink and a fold down table. Cabin headroom is 42 in (110 cm).

The boat has a PHRF racing average handicap of 276 and a hull speed of 5.58 kn (10.33 km/h).

== Operational history ==
In a 2010 review Steve Henkel wrote, "Best features: The competition in this size and weight range was fierce in the 1970s, and to clearly differentiate their product, Bayliner went for low price, a wide beam for plenty of space below, and a simple-to-use boat. Then, as now, this attracted the non-sailing public as buyers. Neophyte sailors found a vessel with a low first cost, and a shallow keel for easy launching and retrieving on a trailer ramp. The long keel also enables the hull to track well under power or when going downwind ... Worst features: The new sailors would also find eventually that a boat with a shallow keel tends to side-slip when sailing upwind in a light to moderate breeze. A long, narrow centerboard housed within the keel (such as on the Chrysler 20) would have eliminated that shortcoming, but would raise the price and complicate sailing."

== See also ==
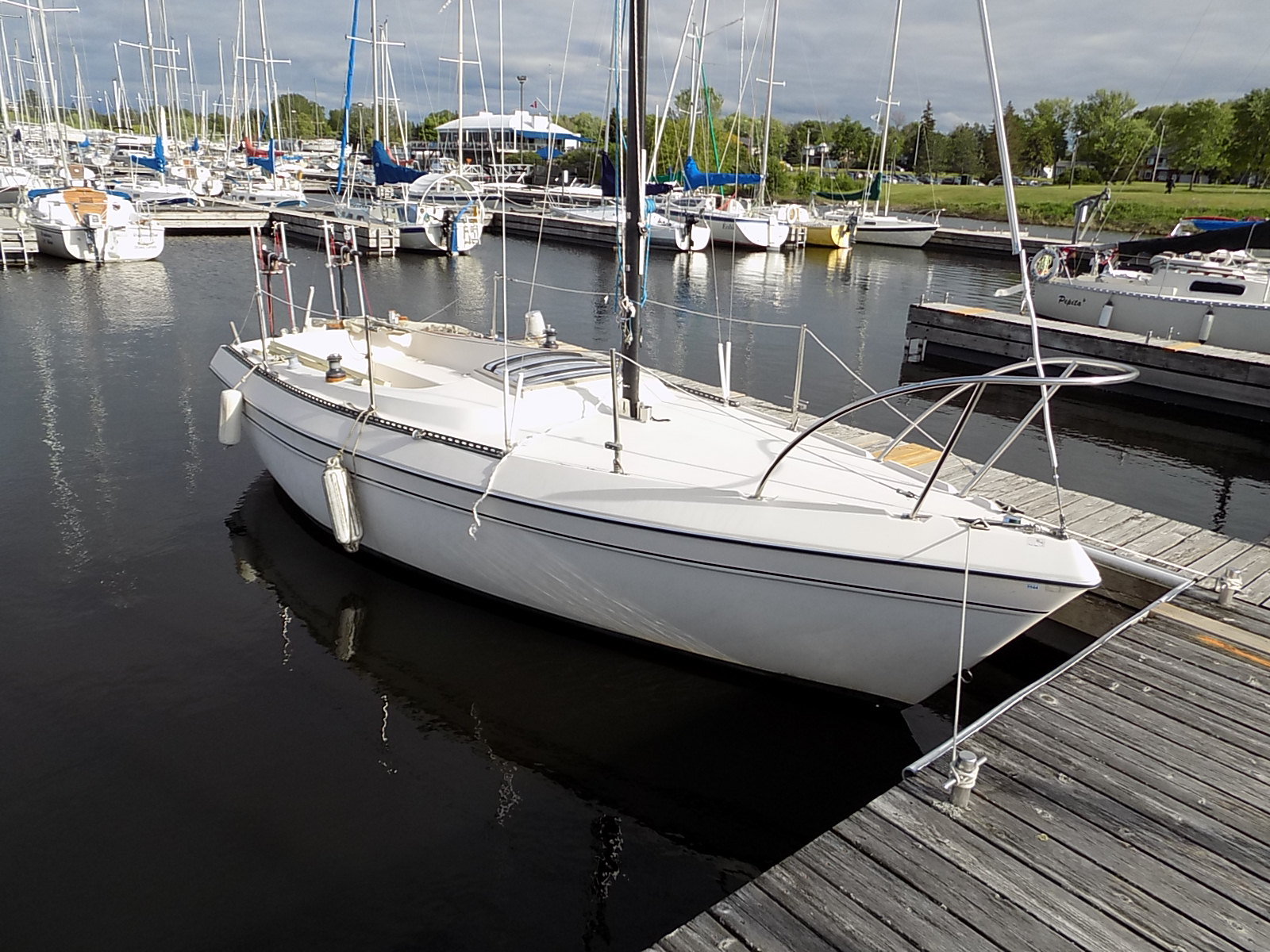
Buccaneer 200

- List of sailing boat types

Related development

- Buccaneer 210

Similar sailboats

- Cal 20
- Com-Pac Sunday Cat
- Chrysler 20
- Drascombe Lugger
- Drascombe Scaffie
- Halman 20
- Hunter 18.5
- Hunter 19-1
- Hunter 19 (Europa)
- Mercury 18
- Naiad 18
- Paceship 20
- Sandpiper 565
- Sanibel 18
- Santana 20
- Siren 17
