= Hunter 20 =

Sailboat class

Development
- Designer: Cortland Steck
- Location: United States
- Year: 1983
- Builder: Hunter Marine
- Name: Hunter 20

Boat
- Displacement: 1,700 lb (771 kg)
- Draft: 4.00 ft (1.22 m), with centerboard down

Hull
- Type: Monohull
- Construction: Fiberglass
- LOA: 19.67 ft (6.00 m)
- LWL: 15.50 ft (4.72 m)
- Beam: 7.50 ft (2.29 m)
- Engine: Outboard motor

Hull appendages
- Keel: centerboard
- Ballast: 400 lb (181 kg)
- Rudder: transom-mounted rudder

Rig
- Rig type: Bermuda rig
- I foretriangle height: 21.00 ft (6.40 m)
- J foretriangle base: 6.75 ft (2.06 m)
- P mainsail luff: 23.50 ft (7.16 m)
- E mainsail foot: 8.33 ft (2.54 m)

Sails
- Sailplan: Fractional rigged sloop
- Mainsail area: 97.88 sq ft (9.093 m^{2})
- Jib/genoa area: 70.88 sq ft (6.585 m^{2})
- Total sail area: 168.75 sq ft (15.677 m^{2})

Racing
- PHRF: 282 (average)

The Hunter 20 is an American trailerable sailboat that was designed by Cortland Steck as daysailer and small cruiser and first built in 1983.

== Production ==
The design was built by Hunter Marine in the United States between 1983-1984, but it is now out of production.

== Design ==
The Hunter 20 is a recreational keelboat, built predominantly of fiberglass, with wood trim. It has a fractional sloop rig, a raked stem, a vertical transom, a transom-hung rudder controlled by a tiller, a "pop-up" companionway hatch and a retractable centerboard. It displaces 1,700 lb (771 kg) and carries 400 lb (181 kg) of ballast.

The boat has a draft of 4.00 ft (1.22 m) with the centreboard extended and 1.25 ft (0.38 m) with it retracted, allowing beaching or ground transportation on a trailer.

Standard equipment includes a stove and cooler, toilet, life jackets and an anchor.

The design has sleeping accommodation for five people, with a double "V"-berth in the bow cabin, a straight settee in the main cabin and a dinette table that drops down to form a double berth on the starboard side. The galley slides under the cockpit when not in use. Cabin headroom is 50 in (127 cm).

The boat is normally fitted with a small 3 to 6 hp (2 to 4 kW) outboard motor for docking and maneuvering.

The design has a PHRF racing average handicap of 282 with a high of 274 and low of 288. It has a hull speed of 5.28 kn (9.78 km/h).

== Operational history ==
In a 2010 review Steve Henkel wrote, "best features: Compared to her comp[etitor]s, the Hunter 20 is small. She is shortest on LOD, has the lowest ballast and the highest D/L (with by far the shortest waterline), and ties for lowest displacement. Nevertheless the accommodations, while not spacious, are cleverly arranged to include a dinette, complete with table and facing seats. A galley slides forward from under the cockpit when needed. Worst features: The forward V-berth does not provide adequate room for two adults to share."

== See also ==
- List of sailing boat types

Similar sailboats

- Buccaneer 220
- Cal 20
- Core Sound 20 Mark 3
- Flicka 20
- Halman 20
- Mistral T-21
- Nordica 16
- Paceship 20
- San Juan 21
- Sirius 22
