= Hunter 19 =

Hunter 19 may refer to three different sailboat designs:

- Hunter 19-1, produced 1981-1983 by Hunter Marine in the United States, under the designation Hunter 19
- Hunter 19-2, produced 1993-1996 by Hunter Marine in the United States, under the designation Hunter 19
- Hunter 19 (Europa), produced 1972-1982 by Hunter Boats in the United Kingdom, under the designation Hunter 19
