= Typhoon 18 =

Sailboat class

Typhoon 18 Weekender
Development
- Designer: Carl Alberg
- Location: United States
- Year: 1967
- No. built: 1,982
- Builders: Cape Dory Yachts; Naugus Fiberglass
- Role: Cruiser-Day sailer
- Name: Typhoon 18 Weekender

Boat
- Displacement: 2,000 lb (907 kg)
- Draft: 2.58 ft (0.79 m)

Hull
- Type: monohull
- Construction: fiberglass
- LOA: 18.50 ft (5.64 m)
- LWL: 13.50 ft (4.11 m)
- Beam: 6.29 ft (1.92 m)

Hull appendages
- Keel: long keel
- Ballast: 900 lb (408 kg)
- Rudder: keel-mounted rudder

Rig
- Rig type: Bermuda rig
- I foretriangle height: 19.08 ft (5.82 m)
- J foretriangle base: 6.17 ft (1.88 m)
- P mainsail luff: 22.00 ft (6.71 m)
- E mainsail foot: 8.75 ft (2.67 m)

Sails
- Sailplan: fractional rigged sloop
- Mainsail area: 96.25 sq ft (8.942 m^{2})
- Jib/genoa area: 58.86 sq ft (5.468 m^{2})
- Total sail area: 155.11 sq ft (14.410 m^{2})

The Typhoon 18 is a family of American trailerable sailboats that was designed by Carl Alberg as day sailers and cruisers, first built in 1967.

== Production ==
The design was built by Cape Dory Yachts and Naugus Fiberglass in the United States, but it is now out of production.

== Design ==
The Typhoon 18 is a recreational keelboat, built predominantly of fiberglass, with balsa-cored decks and teak wooden trim, including coamings and taffrails. It has a fractional sloop rig with anodized aluminum spars. The hull has a raked stem; a raised counter, angled transom; a keel-mounted rudder controlled by a tiller and a fixed long keel.

For sailing the design may equipped with a working jib or a genoa. All models have genoa tracks and jib winches.

== Variants ==
Cape Dory Yachts Typhoon 18 Weekender
This model was built by Cape Dory Yachts and was their most successful boat model produced, built from 1967 to 1986, with 1,982 boats completed. The Weekender has a bigger cabin and smaller cockpit than the Daysailer model. It has sleeping accommodation for four people in a double bow "V" berth and two quarter berths. A head was optional. Stowage is provided in two cockpit lockers, plus cabin shelving. It has a length overall of 18.50 ft (5.6 m), a waterline length of 13.50 ft (4.1 m), displaces 2,000 lb (907 kg) and carries 900 lb (408 kg) of lead ballast. The boat has a draft of 2.58 ft (0.79 m) with the standard keel.
Cape Dory Yachts Typhoon 18 Daysailer
This model was built by Cape Dory Yachts between 1974 and 1986, with 141 boats completed. The Daysailer has a larger cockpit with teak seats and smaller cuddy cabin without any portholes. The rub rails and strakes are also teak. Stowage is provided in a forepeak locker. At least one was built in about 1974 that had no cuddy cabin at all, just an enlarged cockpit and which was also marketed as the Typhoon Daysailer. The Daysailer has a length overall of 18.50 ft (5.6 m), a waterline length of 13.50 ft (4.1 m), displaces 2,000 lb (907 kg) and carries 900 lb (408 kg) of lead ballast. The boat has a draft of 2.58 ft (0.79 m) with the standard keel.
Naugus Typhoon 18
This model was built by Naugus Fiberglass and introduced in 1974. This model predated the Cape Dory Daysailer on the market and has an open cockpit, with no cabin. At least one was built. It has a length overall of 18.50 ft (5.6 m), a waterline length of 13.50 ft (4.1 m), displaces 1,900 lb (862 kg) and carries 900 lb (408 kg) of lead ballast. The boat has a draft of 2.60 ft (0.79 m) with the standard keel.

== Operational history ==
The boat is supported by an active class club that organizes racing events, the Cape Dory Sailboat Owners Association.

John Kretschmer wrote a review of the design in Sailing Magazine in 2008, describing it as "certainly one of America's best-loved small boats". He noted, "It's a boat that beginners and seasoned sailors alike appreciate because it satisfies on many levels. It's aesthetically pleasing, responds to a sure hand on the helm, is safe in a blow and steady when an annoying powerboat stirs up a chop. It's not a sport boat-heck, it's not fast by any definition-but it's still a delight to sail. I can see the day when I am done crossing oceans, I'll own a sweet little Typhoon and spend my afternoons gliding about the harbor, checking out all the new boats. The Typhoon is a boat to sail just for sake of sailing, one of those things you understand intrinsically or you never will."

Steve Knauth did an interview with owner Frank Hall in 2010 for Soundings. Hall described the boat's sailing characteristics: "the boat handles exceptionally well when the wind increases to 15 or 20 knots ... The strongest wind that I sailed in was in a race when it was blowing 20 to 23 knots. I had a full main with a reef in the jib and she handled it very well, with a moderate heel. The rudder is well-balanced with little windward helm."

In a 2010 review Steve Henkel wrote, "Of all the boats in this comp[etitor] group of four, the CD Typhoon 18 is the design we'd feel most comfortable with in iffy weather—despite the fact that her cockpit sole is too close to the waterline to be fully self-bailing, though you could probably leave her at a mooring and expect the rain that falls into her to drain successfully. Best features: She has enough ballast to keep her stiff when sailing short-handed in a blow. Her motion in a chop will be relatively comfortable. She looks competent and pretty in a traditional way, and is well-built with quality bronze fittings and wood trim. She was made over a span of 25 years, so you can probably find used boats in a wide range of prices that might suit your budget. Worst features: Since she was built by several builders before Cape Dory began production, through hard times as well as good, the construction quality may vary widely among the old boats available today. Buyer beware!"

== See also ==
- List of sailing boat types

Similar sailboats

- Drascombe Lugger
- Drascombe Scaffie
- Hunter 18.5
- Hunter 19-1
- Hunter 19 (Europa)
- Mercury 18
- Naiad 18
- Paceship 20
- Sandpiper 565
- Sanibel 18
- Siren 17
