= Drascombe Scaffie =

Sailboat class

Scaffie
Development
- Designer: John L. Watkinson
- Location: United Kingdom
- Year: 1978
- Builder: Honnor Marine Classics
- Name: Scaffie

Boat
- Displacement: 463 lb (210 kg)
- Draft: 1.21 ft (0.37 m)

Hull
- Type: Monohull
- Construction: Fibreglass
- LOA: 14.76 ft (4.50 m)
- LWL: 12.30 ft (3.75 m)
- Beam: 5.74 ft (1.75 m)
- Engine: Outboard motor 2 to 3 hp (1 to 2 kW)

Hull appendages
- Keel: triple keel
- Rudder: transom-mounted rudder

Rig
- Rig type: Lug rig

Sails
- Sailplan: Lug sail
- Mainsail area: 100 sq ft (9.3 m^{2})
- Total sail area: 100 sq ft (9.3 m^{2})

The Drascombe Scaffie, now marketed as the Devon Scaffie, is a British trailerable sailboat that was designed by John L. Watkinson and first built in 1978. The modern Scaffie is based upon a traditional British boat design that dates back several hundred years.

The Scaffie design is one of a large range of similar Drascombe boats with different hull, cabin and rig configurations.

== Production ==
The design has been built by Honnor Marine Classics in Swanage, Dorset, United Kingdom. It remains in production.

== Design ==
The Scaffie is a recreational sailboat, built predominantly of fibreglass, with hardwood trim. It is an open boat, with no cabin. It has a lug sail rig with Sitka spruce spars and a loose-footed, terylene mainsail. A sloop rig is a factory option. The lapstrake-style hull has a spooned raked stem, a rounded transom, a transom-hung, wooden rudder controlled by an ash wood tiller and a fixed triple keel. It has a central long keel and two side bilge keels, allowing it to remain upright when left high and dry at low tide. It displaces 463 lb (210 kg) and weighs 748 lb (339 kg) when fully equipped. Foam buoyancy is fitted. It uses flooding water ballast, which is drained for road transport.

The boat has a draft of 1.21 ft (0.37 m) with the standard triple keels.

The boat is normally fitted with a small, well-mounted, 2 to 3 hp (1 to 2 kW) outboard motor for docking and manoeuvring. It also comes with oarlocks for rowing.

== Operational history ==
In a 1994 review Richard Sherwood wrote, "the Drascombe Scaffie is a design that has been used in coastal sailing for over 200 years. Scaffies have been built for many years in England, and they are now also built in Maine. The loose-footed lug sail is carried on an unstayed mast. Since there is no centerboard trunk the cockpit has a lot of space, and with a tent, the Scaffie is used for cruising."

In a 2018 review for Watercraft Magazine, writer Alice Driscoll stated, "she's incredibly easy to sail and manage but still has the power to make for an exciting sail. And yet, if the wind dies to nothing or you realise you've only got a short time to make it to the pub for lunch, then you can quickly power her up and chug along with the outboard."

== See also ==
- List of sailing boat types

Related development

- Drascombe Lugger

Similar sailboats

- Buccaneer 200
- Com-Pac Sunday Cat
- Naiad 18
- Typhoon 18
