= Nordica 20 =

1970s Canadian recreaitonal keelboat

Development
- Designer: B. Malta-Muller
- Location: Canada
- Year: 1975
- Builder: Nordica Yachts (Exe Fibercraft)
- Name: Nordica 20

Boat
- Displacement: 2,520 lb (1,143 kg)
- Draft: 3.25 ft (0.99 m)

Hull
- Type: monohull
- Construction: fibreglass
- LOA: 19.50 ft (5.94 m)
- LWL: 16.50 ft (5.03 m)
- Beam: 7.67 ft (2.34 m)
- Engine: BMW or Renault 7 hp (5 kW) diesel engine

Hull appendages
- Keel: long keel
- Ballast: 1,020 lb (463 kg)
- Rudder: keel-mounted rudder

Rig
- Rig type: Bermuda rig
- I foretriangle height: 25.16 ft (7.67 m)
- J foretriangle base: 6.33 ft (1.93 m)
- P mainsail luff: 23.33 ft (7.11 m)
- E mainsail foot: 9.16 ft (2.79 m)

Sails
- Sailplan: masthead sloop
- Mainsail area: 106.85 sq ft (9.927 m^{2})
- Jib/genoa area: 79.63 sq ft (7.398 m^{2})
- Total sail area: 186.48 sq ft (17.325 m^{2})

Racing
- PHRF: 276

The Nordica 20 is a recreational keelboat. It was built by Nordica Yachts, a brand of Exe Fibercraft, in Canada from 1975 to 1985.

== Design ==
It was designed by B. Malta-Muller as a cruiser. The Nordica 20 is a built predominantly of fibreglass. It has a masthead sloop rig, a spooned plumb stem, a rounded transom, a keel-mounted rudder controlled by a tiller and a fixed long keel. It displaces 2,520 lb (1,143 kg) and carries 1,020 lb (463 kg) of ballast.

The boat has a draft of 3.25 ft (0.99 m) with the standard keel.

The boat is fitted with an inboard BMW or Renault 7 hp (5 kW) diesel engine or an outboard motor for docking and manoeuvring. The fuel tank holds 7 U.S. gallons (26 L; 5.8 imp gal).

The design has sleeping accommodation for four people, with a double "V"-berth in the bow cabin and two straight settee berths in the main cabin. Cabin headroom is 60 in (152 cm).

The design has a PHRF racing average handicap of 276 and a hull speed of 5.4 kn (10.0 km/h).

== Reception ==
In a 2010 review Steve Henkel wrote, "... best features: The springy sheer and rounded stern on both the Nordica and Halman give them a salty look. Worst features: [They] have relatively small cockpits; more than two occupants would constitute a crowd. Perhaps that is just as well, since buoyancy aft is limited by the pinched stern; more than two occupants would push the stern down, upsetting the natural trim of the hull. Consequently the extra two berths are pretty much usable only for stowage or in harbor."
