= West Wight Potter 19 =

Sailboat class

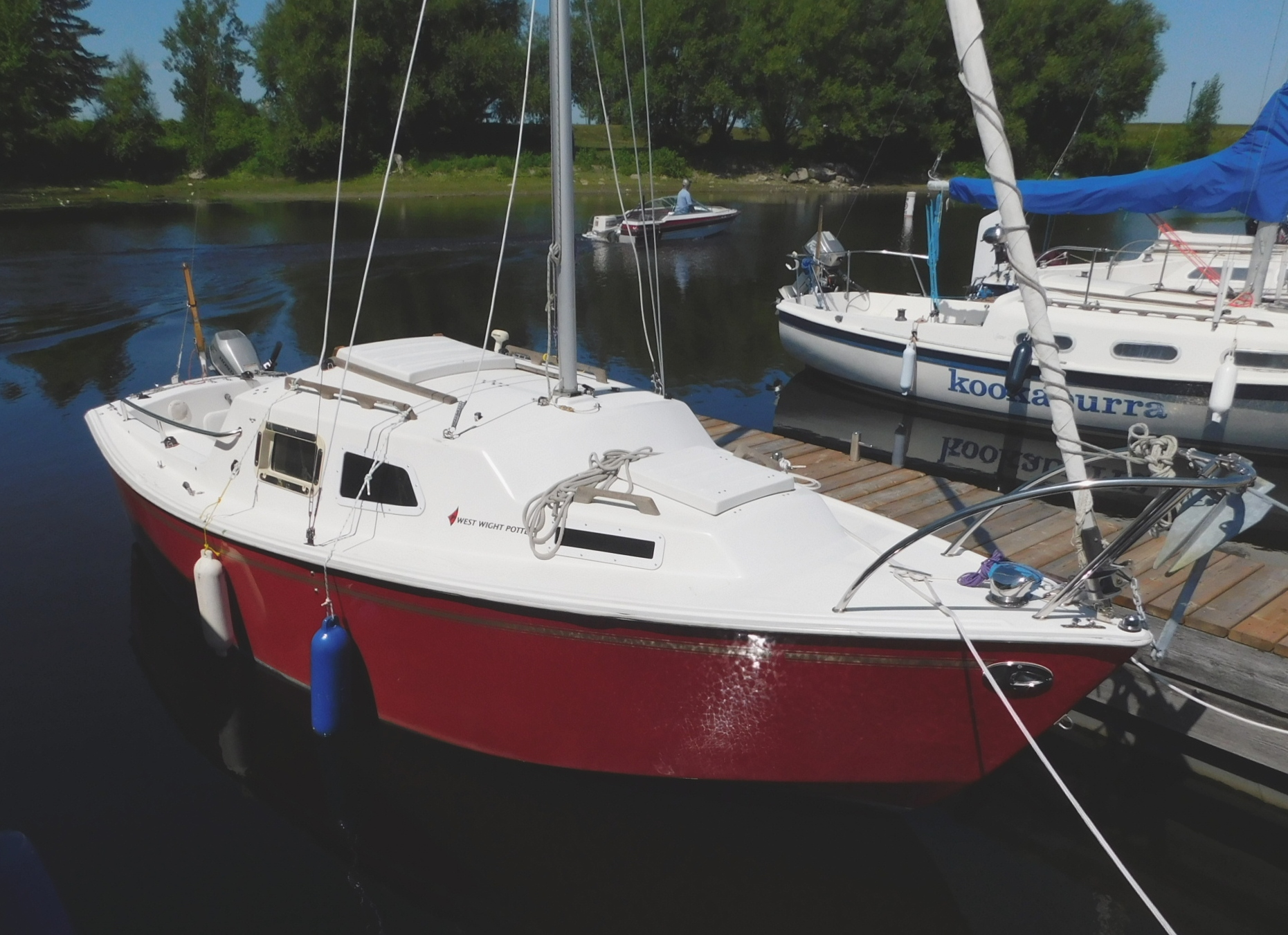

Development
- Designer: Herb Stewart
- Location: United States
- Year: 1971
- No. built: more than 1600
- Builder: International Marine
- Name: West Wight Potter 19

Boat
- Displacement: 1,225 lb (556 kg)
- Draft: 3.58 ft (1.09 m) keel down

Hull
- Type: Monohull
- Construction: Fiberglass
- LOA: 18.75 ft (5.72 m)
- LWL: 16.75 ft (5.11 m)
- Beam: 7.50 ft (2.29 m)
- Engine: Outboard motor

Hull appendages
- Keel: lifting keel
- Ballast: 370 lb (168 kg)
- Rudder: transom-mounted rudder

Rig
- Rig type: Bermuda rig

Sails
- Sailplan: Fractional rigged sloop
- Total sail area: 132 sq ft (12.3 m^{2})

The West Wight Potter 19 is a fractional sloop rigged 18-foot keelboat. More than 1600 were built by International Marine in Inglewood, California from 1971 to 2017 It was originally marketed by the manufacturer as the HMS 18.

== Design ==
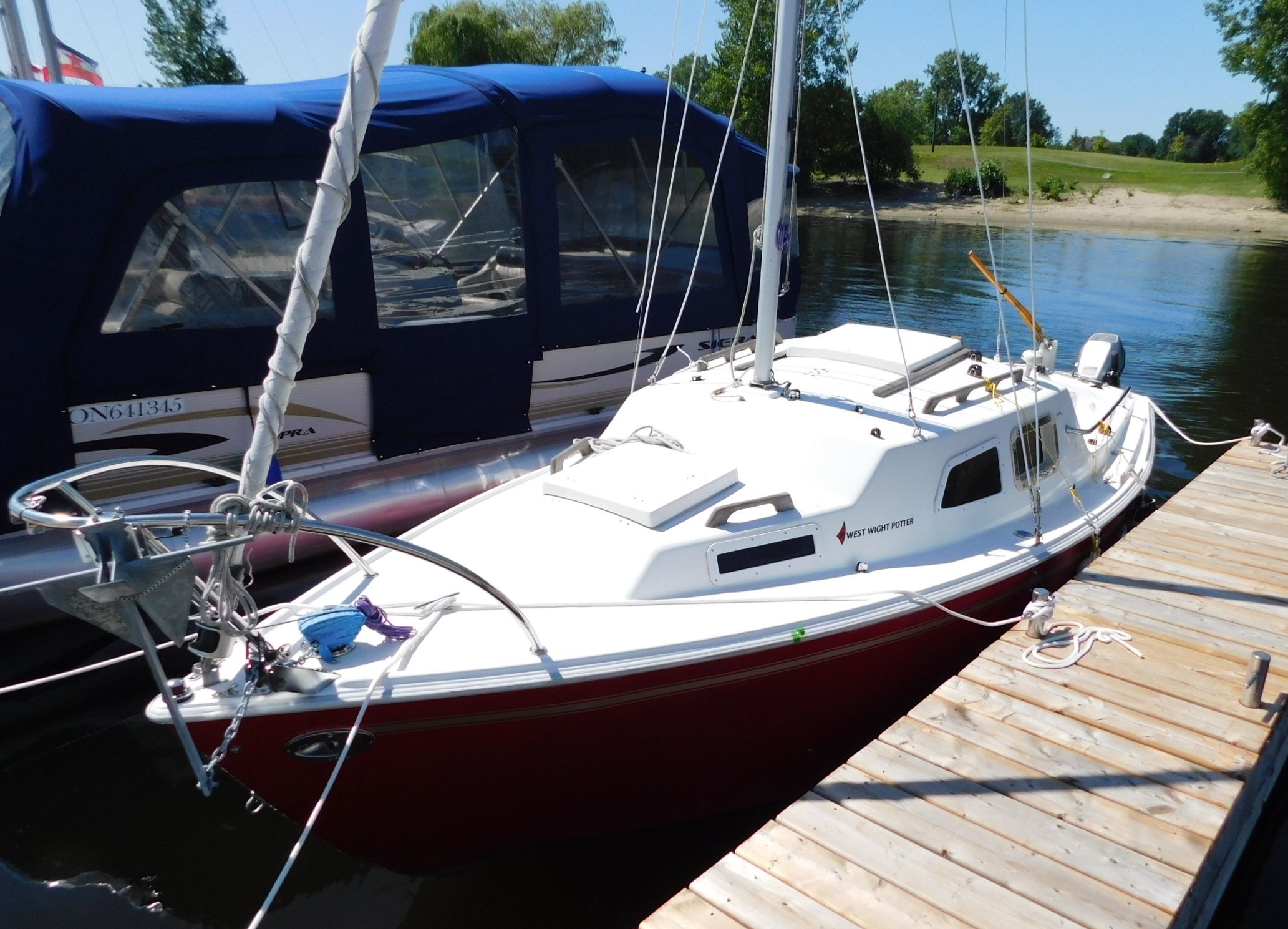
West Wight Potter 19

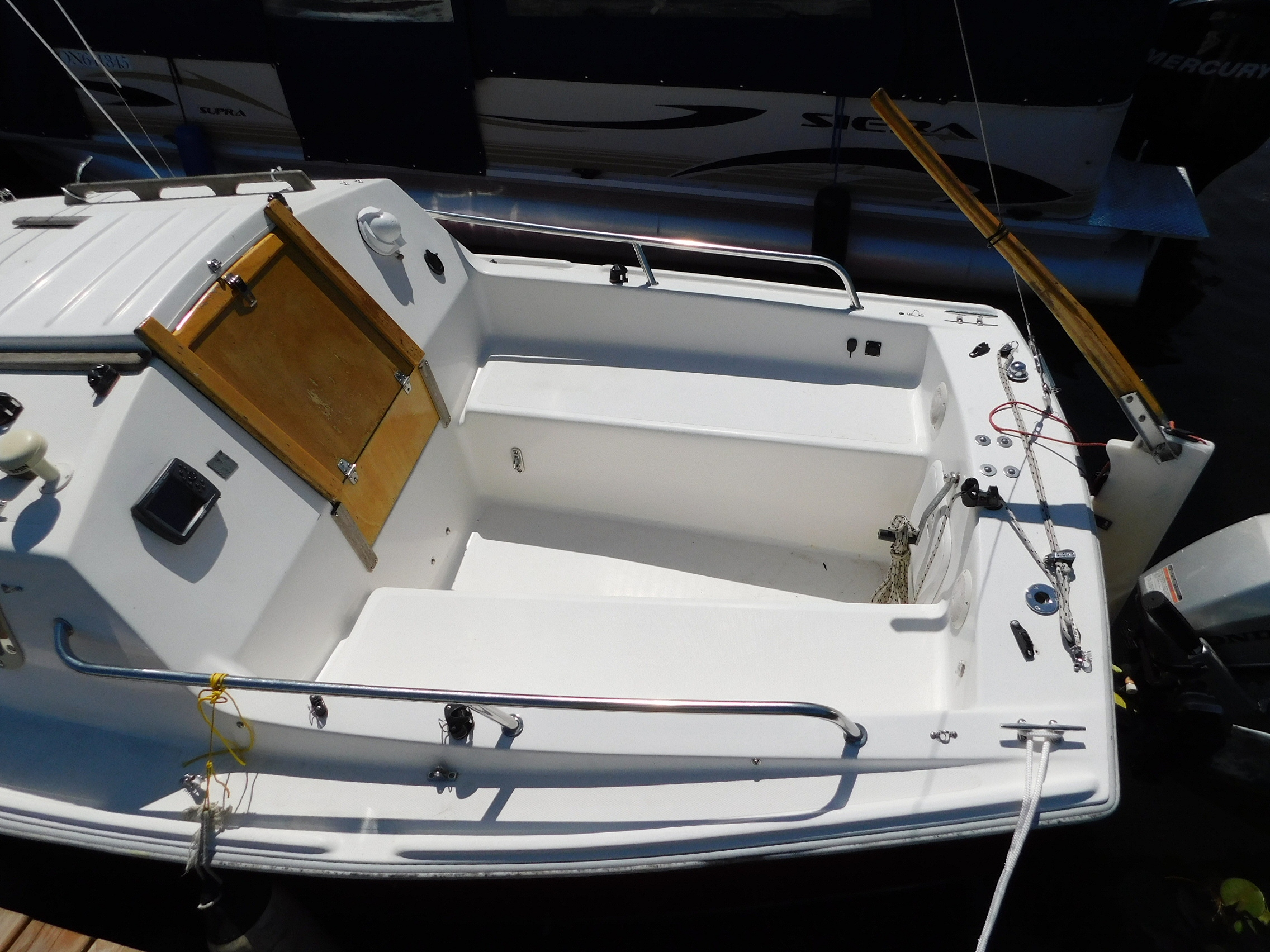
West Wight Potter 19 cockpit

Herb Stewart developed the design from the West Wight Potter 14, a British design for which he had bought the US rights.

It has a hard chine fiberglass hull with a spooned raked stem, a vertical transom, a transom-hung rudder controlled by a tiller, and a vertically lifting fin keel. It displaces 1,225 lb (556 kg) and carries 370 lb (168 kg) of ballast. It is equipped with closed cell foam flotation and is unsinkable.

The boat has a draft of 3.58 ft (1.09 m) with the lifting keel extended and 0.50 ft (0.15 m) with it retracted, allowing use as a trailer sailer. The keel is retracted from the cockpit by a winch and fully retracts.

It has a hull speed of 5.5 kn (10.2 km/h).

The boat is normally fitted with a small 3 to 6 hp (2 to 4 kW) outboard motor for docking and maneuvering.

The galley consists of a sink to port and single-burner butane stove to starboard. There is sleeping accommodation for four people and seating for five and a portable head. The manufacturer claims the boat can be rigged and launched from its trailer in 45 minutes and can also be single-handly rigged and launched. Cabin headroom is 55 in (140 cm).

A 2008 review by John Kretschmer noted, "while plenty of Potters have made impressive passages, most are sailed quietly on lakes, bays and coastline all over the country. Most importantly, they're almost universally admired by the folks who own them, and for good reason. The boat is stable in the water, it can stand up to a breeze, it's surprisingly commodious, it's easy to launch and can be trailed behind almost any vehicle. Mounted on its trailer the West Wight Potter 19 fits snugly in most garages, which eliminates the cost of dockage and winter storage."

Mike Brown wrote a review of the design in 2009, stating, "it might not have the catchiest of names, but I found everything else about the West Wight Potter 19 delightful ... I am completely sold on the Potter 19, and I despair for the taste of our boating population if it does not sell in numbers. It was one of the few review boats I had to be politely ejected from. I did not want to go home.".

In a 2010 review Steve Henkel wrote, "best features: The WWP 19 shares many of the positive features listed for the WWP 15 ... including the ability to sail in adverse conditions (up to a point). Her longer LOD, higher headroom, and two feet of extra beam relieve some (but perhaps not all) of the claustrophobic feeling of the WWP 15 ... Worst features: The WWP 19's high, slab-sided hull—which of course give her a lot more than her share of cabin space—detract from her looks. And we wonder what the damage would be to her keel trunk if her vertically sliding keel collided with a rock ledge at five or six knots."

In a 2019 review Tom Lochhaas wrote, "of the wide variety of small trailerable sailboats on the market, the Potter 19 better meets the needs of owners who want to do some cruising than almost others, which at this length are typically designed more for daysailing than overnighting."
