= Edel 540 =

Sailboat class

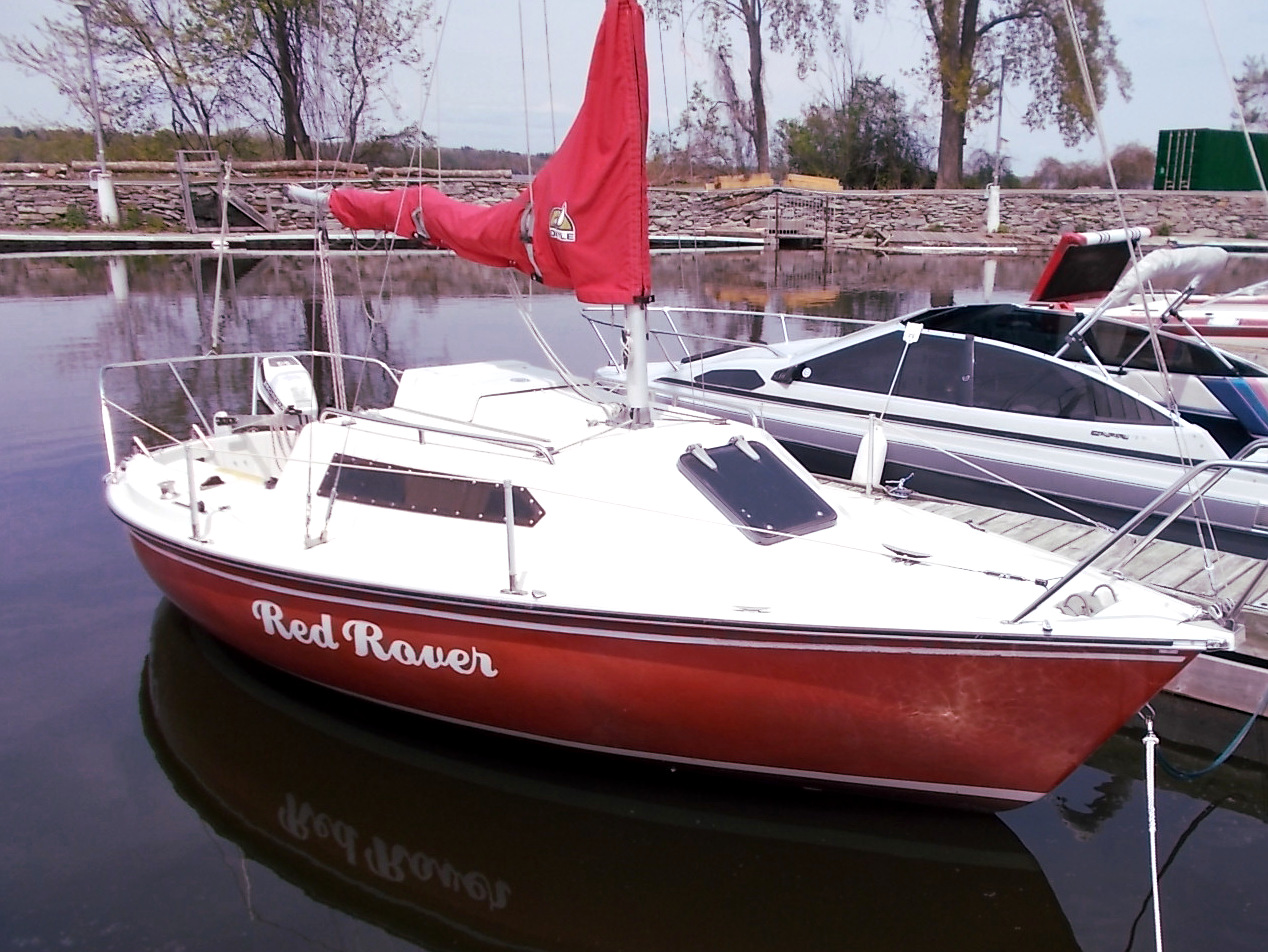

Development
- Designer: Maurice Edel
- Location: France
- Year: 1974
- No. built: 2500
- Builders: Construction Nautic Edel; Edel Canada
- Name: Edel 540

Boat
- Displacement: 1,711 lb (776 kg)
- Draft: 2.29 ft (0.70 m)

Hull
- Type: Monohull
- Construction: Fiberglass
- LOA: 17.71 ft (5.40 m)
- LWL: 14.75 ft (4.50 m)
- Beam: 8.00 ft (2.44 m)
- Engine: Outboard motor

Hull appendages
- Keel: fin keel
- Ballast: 331 lb (150 kg)
- Rudder: transom-mounted rudder

Rig
- Rig type: Bermuda rig

Sails
- Sailplan: Fractional rigged sloop
- Total sail area: 162 sq ft (15.1 m^{2})

The Edel 540 is a fractional sloop keelboat and trailer sailer. From 1974 to 1983, 2500 were built by Construction Nautic Edel in France, and at Edel Canada. It was marketed as the Edel 545 in France and is sometimes referred to as the Edel 5. It has a

== Design ==
Designed by Maurice Edel, the fiberglass hull has a raked stem, vertical transom, transom-hung rudder controlled by a tiller and a fixed fin keel. It displaces 1,711 lb (776 kg) and carries 331 lb (150 kg) of ballast.

The boat has a draft of 2.29 ft (0.70 m) with the standard keel fitted. The boat is normally fitted with a small outboard motor for docking and maneuvering.

The design has a hull speed of 5.15 kn (9.54 km/h).

In a review Michael McGoldrick wrote, "...The 540 tends to compete with the Sandpiper 565, and it is a step up from those small sailboats that come with a minimalist cuddy cabin. In fact, they claim that the Edel 540's cabin has room to sleep 4 people, but this is probably more of an indication that there is sufficient room to sleep two adults in reasonable comfort. For its size, this 18 footer has a very wide beam (8 feet, or 2.44m). While the Edel 540 has a fix keel with 331 pounds of ballast, the wide beam provides for a lot of stability. It's nice looking boat and it tends to appeal to people who want a pocket cruiser that truly looks like a little yacht."
