= Siren 17 =

Popular Canadian recreational keelboat

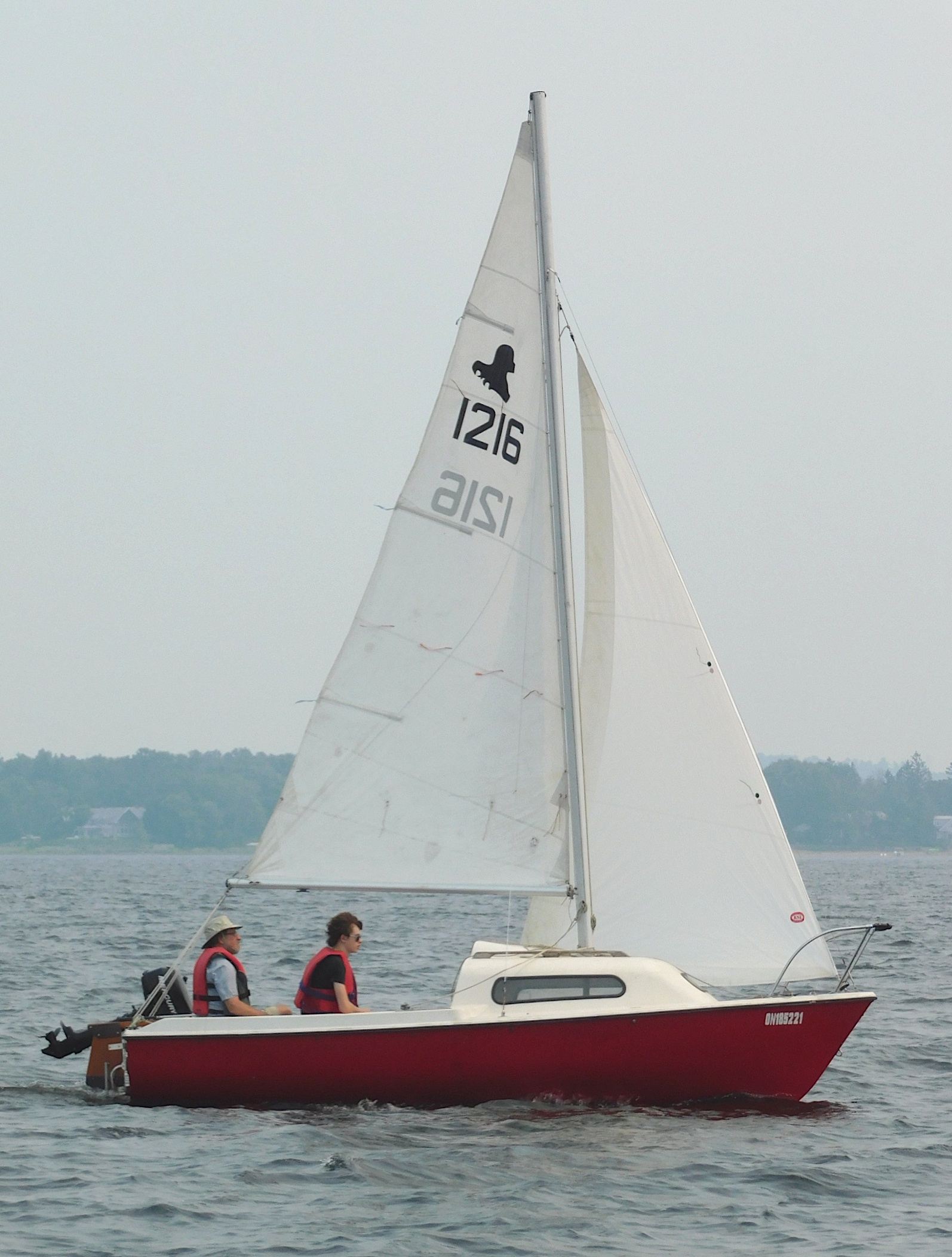

Development
- Designer: Hubert Vandestadt
- Location: Canada
- Year: 1974
- No. built: 3200
- Builder: Vandestadt & McGruer Ltd
- Name: Siren 17

Boat
- Displacement: 750 lb (340 kg)
- Draft: 4.25 ft (1.30 m) with centreboard down

Hull
- Type: Monohull
- Construction: Fibreglass
- LOA: 17.17 ft (5.23 m)
- LWL: 15.00 ft (4.57 m)
- Beam: 6.67 ft (2.03 m)
- Engine: Outboard motor

Hull appendages
- Keel: fin keel
- Ballast: 130 lb (59 kg)
- Rudder: transom-mounted rudder

Rig
- General: Fractional rigged sloop
- I foretriangle height: 17.00 ft (5.18 m)
- J foretriangle base: 6.00 ft (1.83 m)
- P mainsail luff: 22.00 ft (6.71 m)
- E mainsail foot: 8.00 ft (2.44 m)

Sails
- Mainsail area: 88.00 sq ft (8.175 m^{2})
- Jib/genoa area: 51.00 sq ft (4.738 m^{2})
- Total sail area: 139.00 sq ft (12.914 m^{2})

The Siren 17 is a recreational keelboat built by Vandestadt & McGruer Ltd in Owen Sound, Ontario, Canada, between 1974 and 1987. It was one of the most successful small sailboats ever built with 3200 completed.

== Design ==
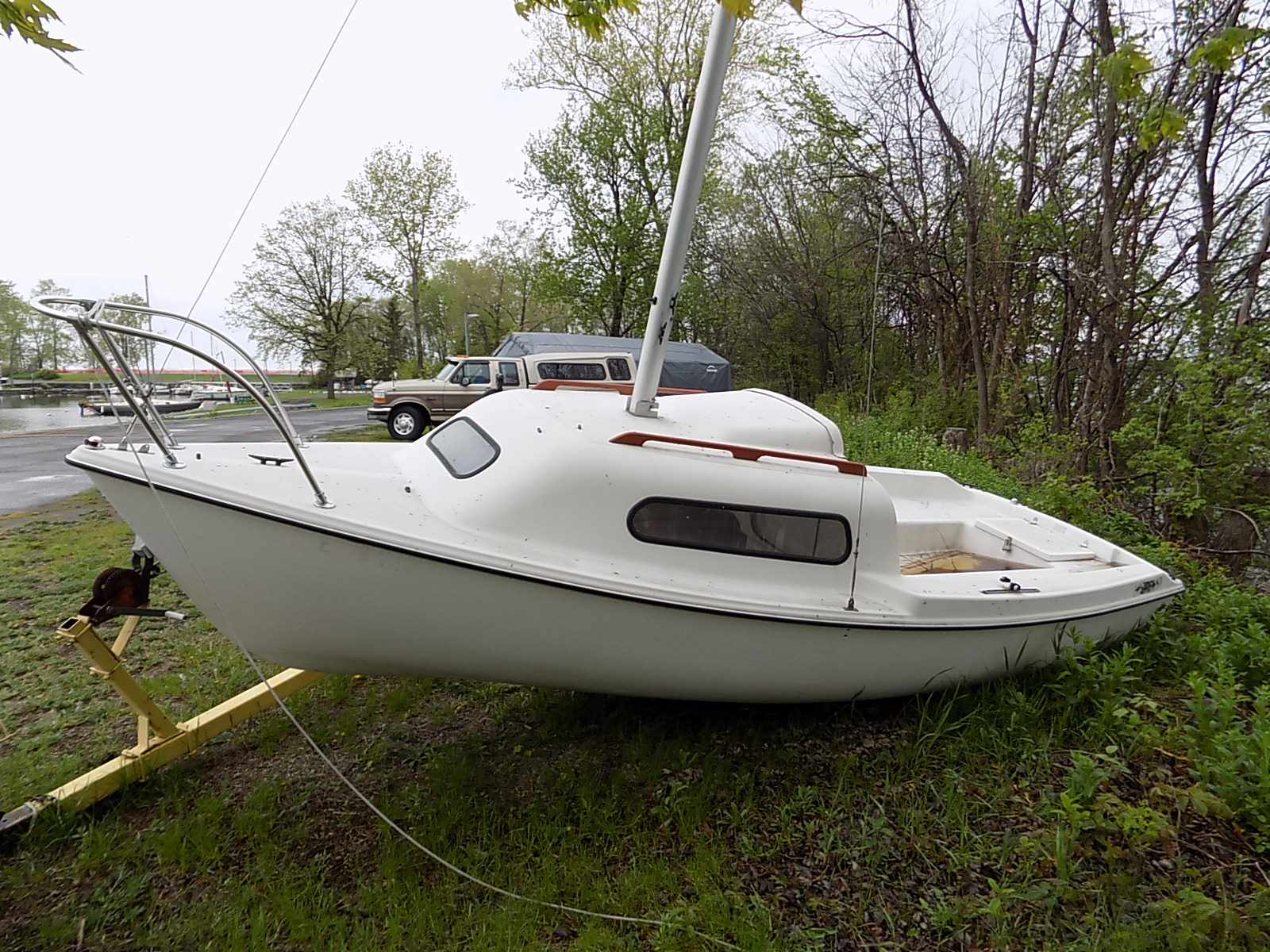
Siren 17 sailboat with trailer

The Siren 17 is a small recreational keelboat, built predominantly of fibreglass and foam flotation, with mahogany wood trim. It has a fractional sloop rig, with a hinged mast step and jiffy-reefing, a transom-hung rudder and a retractable centreboard keel. The cockpit is self-bailing and 7 ft (2.1 m) long. It displaces 750 lb (340 kg) and carries 130 lb (59 kg) of iron ballast. It has foam flotation for positive buoyancy.

The boat has a draft of 4.25 ft (1.30 m) with the centreboard extended and 0.67 ft (0.20 m) with it retracted, allowing beaching or ground transportation on a trailer.

The boat is normally fitted with a small outboard motor of up to 7 hp (5 kW) for manoeuvring. It has a hull speed of 5.19 kn (9.61 km/h).

The design has sleeping accommodation for four people, including two adults. The galley is equipped with a moulded-in icebox, with an alcohol stove optional. The head is a portable type. Cabin headroom is 44 in (112 cm).

== Reception ==
In a 2010 review Steve Henkel wrote, "Siren is a good design for an overnight cruiser for two adults and two small children. Versus her comp[etitor]s, she has the lowest SA/D, making for relatively good stability, but at the expense of light-air performance. And she has the lowest draft, meaning relatively easy launching and retrieving from a trailer. Best features: Below she has foam flotation, a molded-in icebox, space for a stove and a toilet. Space is allocated in the cockpit for a gas tank and storage battery—though its aft location may not be optimal for proper hull trim. Construction and finish are above average. Worst features: Among her comp[etitor]s, she has the lowest Space Index, although for any 17-footer space is going to be tight. A steel centerboard, even though galvanized, may cause maintenance problems, particularly in salt water. Her outboard well doesn't permit an engine to be tilted, causing drag unless engine is removed and stowed—a good reason to choose a small, lightweight engine."

In a review Michael McGoldrick wrote, "The Siren 17 is one of the better "micro cruisers"... It's possible for two adults to sleep in its small cuddy cabin, albeit in very cramped quarters. Many people would prefer to rig a small tent over the boom and sleep in the cockpit (and a custom made tent was actually a factory option for this boat). The Siren 17 has a large cockpit that is longer than what is found on many 23 or 24 footers. With a displacement of only 750 pounds, launching, hauling out, and towing this boat is an extremely feasible proposition with a mid size car."

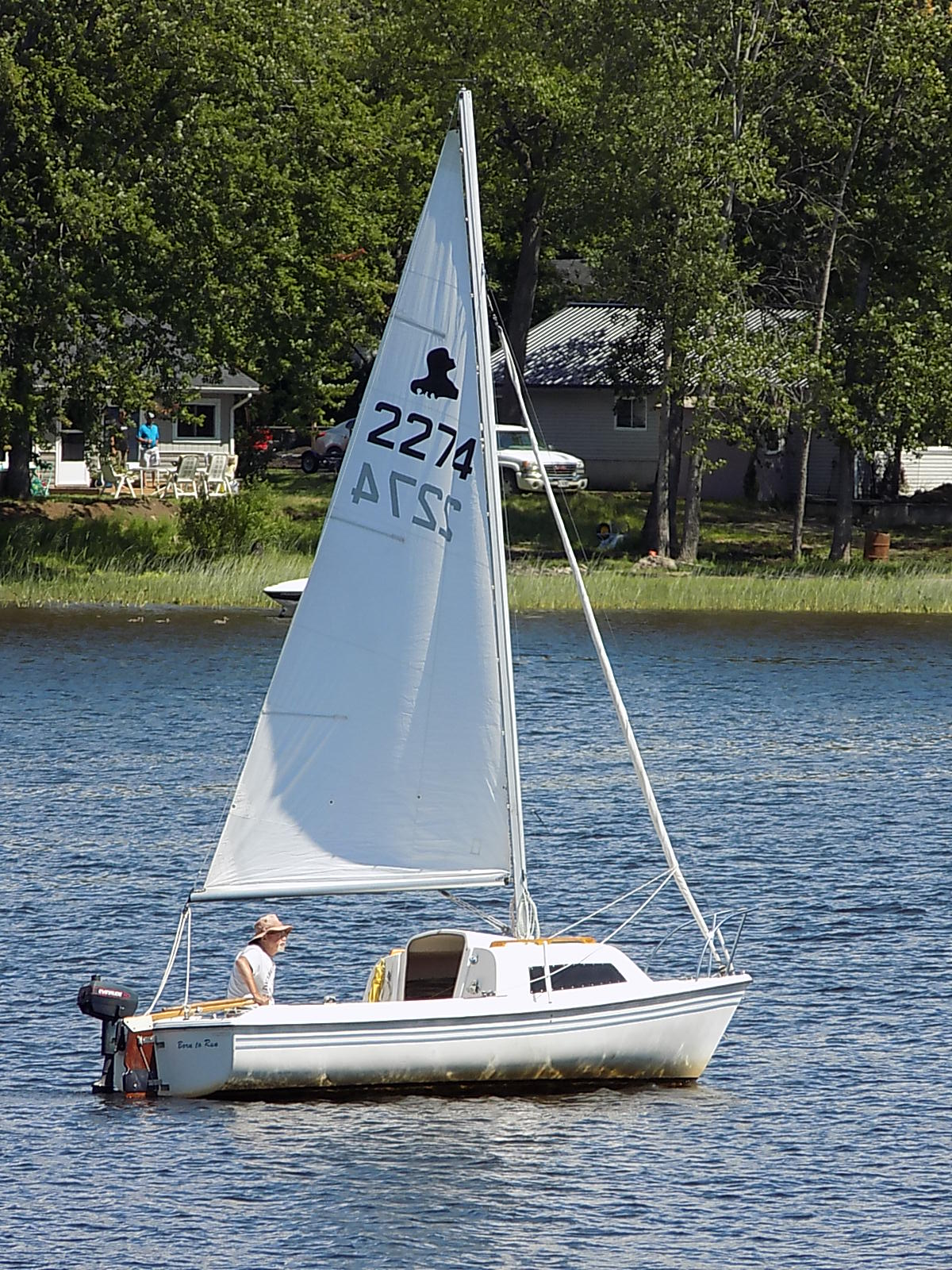
Siren 17
