= Mistral T-21 =

1978 US sailboat

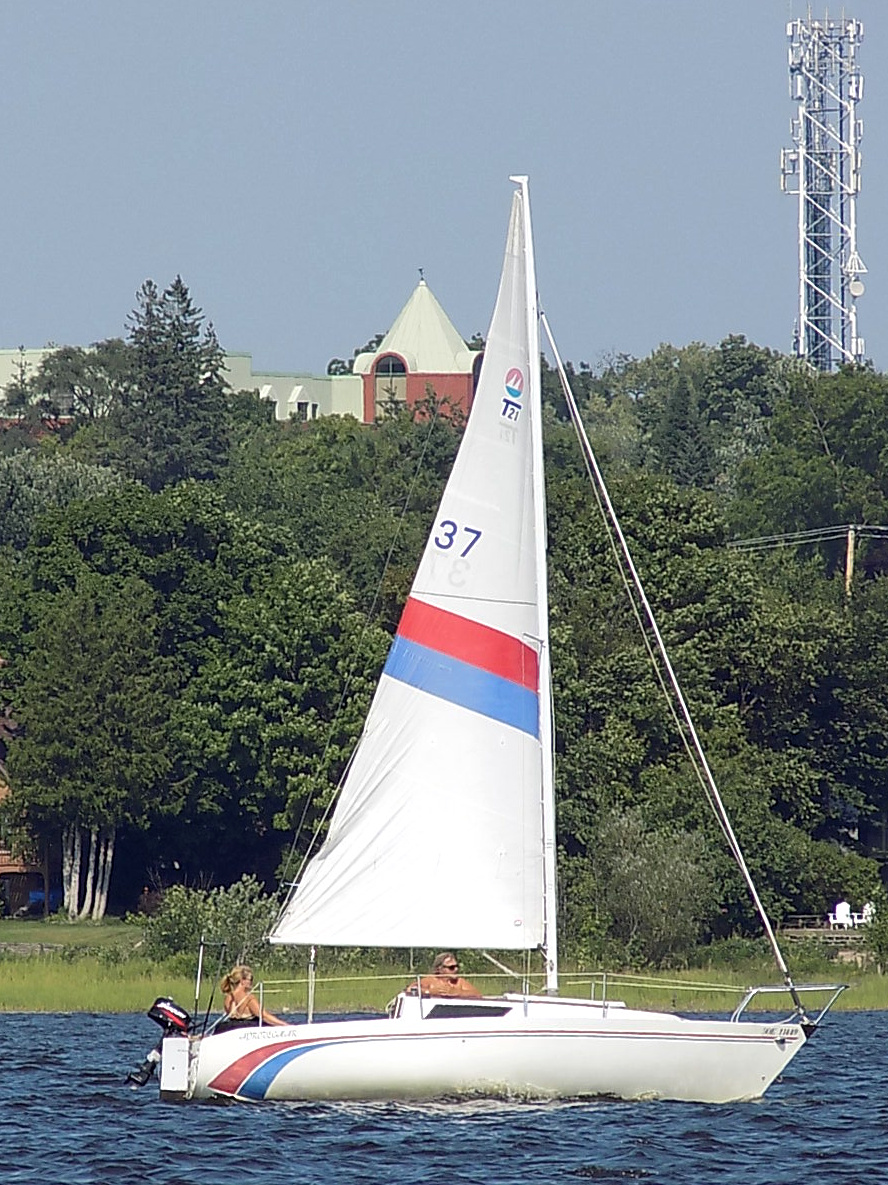

Development
- Designer: Mistral Sailboats
- Location: Canada
- Year: 1978
- Builder: Mistral Sailboats
- Name: Mistral T-21

Boat
- Displacement: 2,700 lb (1,225 kg)
- Draft: 5.10 ft (1.55 m), centreboard down

Hull
- Type: Monohull
- Construction: Fibreglass
- LOA: 21.00 ft (6.40 m)
- LWL: 18.67 ft (5.69 m)
- Beam: 8.16 ft (2.49 m)
- Engine: Outboard motor

Hull appendages
- Keel: Centreboard
- Ballast: 770 lb (349 kg)
- Rudder: transom-mounted rudder

Rig
- Rig type: Bermuda rig
- I foretriangle height: 25.00 ft (7.62 m)
- J foretriangle base: 9.00 ft (2.74 m)
- P mainsail luff: 23.00 ft (7.01 m)
- E mainsail foot: 10.00 ft (3.05 m)

Sails
- Sailplan: Fractional rigged sloop
- Mainsail area: 115.00 sq ft (10.684 m^{2})
- Jib/genoa area: 112.50 sq ft (10.452 m^{2})
- Total sail area: 227.50 sq ft (21.135 m^{2})

Racing
- PHRF: 234

The Mistral T-21 is a sailboat, that was designed by Mistral Sailboats and first built in 1978.

== Production ==
The design was built by Mistral Sailboats in Longueuil, Quebec, Canada, starting in 1978, but the company had ceased production by 1987 when it went out of business.

== Design ==
The Mistral T-21 is a small recreational keelboat, built predominantly of fibreglass. It has a fractional sloop rig, a raked stem, a vertical transom, a transom-hung rudder controlled by a tiller and a retractable centreboard keel. It displaces 2,700 lb (1,225 kg) and carries 770 lb (349 kg) of ballast.

The boat has a draft of 5.10 ft (1.55 m) with the centreboard extended and 1.16 ft (0.35 m) with it retracted, allowing beaching or ground transportation on a trailer.

The boat is normally fitted with a small 3 to 6 hp (2 to 4 kW) outboard motor for docking and manoeuvring.

The design has sleeping accommodation for four people, with a single berth in the bow cabin, a drop down table that converts to a double berth in the main cabin and a quarter berth on the port side, under the cockpit. The galley is located on the port side just forward of the companionway ladder. The galley is equipped with a two-burner stove and a sink. The head is located in the bow cabin on the starboard side. Cabin headroom is 56 in (142 cm).

The design has a PHRF racing average handicap of 234 and a hull speed of 5.79 kn (10.72 km/h).

== Reception ==
In a 2010 review Steve Henkel wrote, "best features: Her layout is very intriguing for a mere 21-footer, encompassing at least two single berths and a double, a dinette, a hanging locker, and a head that, though lacking a door, is virtually 'enclosed' in the forepeak, (The literature we have says she has berths for five, but we can't find the fifth one.) With her fully retracting high-aspect centerboard, and drawing only 1' 2" with the board up, she should be easy to launch and retrieve from a trailer. Worst features: The drawings seem to indicate that the centerboard is relatively light, perhaps 100 to 200 pounds at most. If so, the ballast, which is reported to be 750 pounds, must be located not far below the waterline, which would seem to make it relatively ineffective."
