= San Juan 21 =

1970s US recreational keelboat

San Juan 21-2
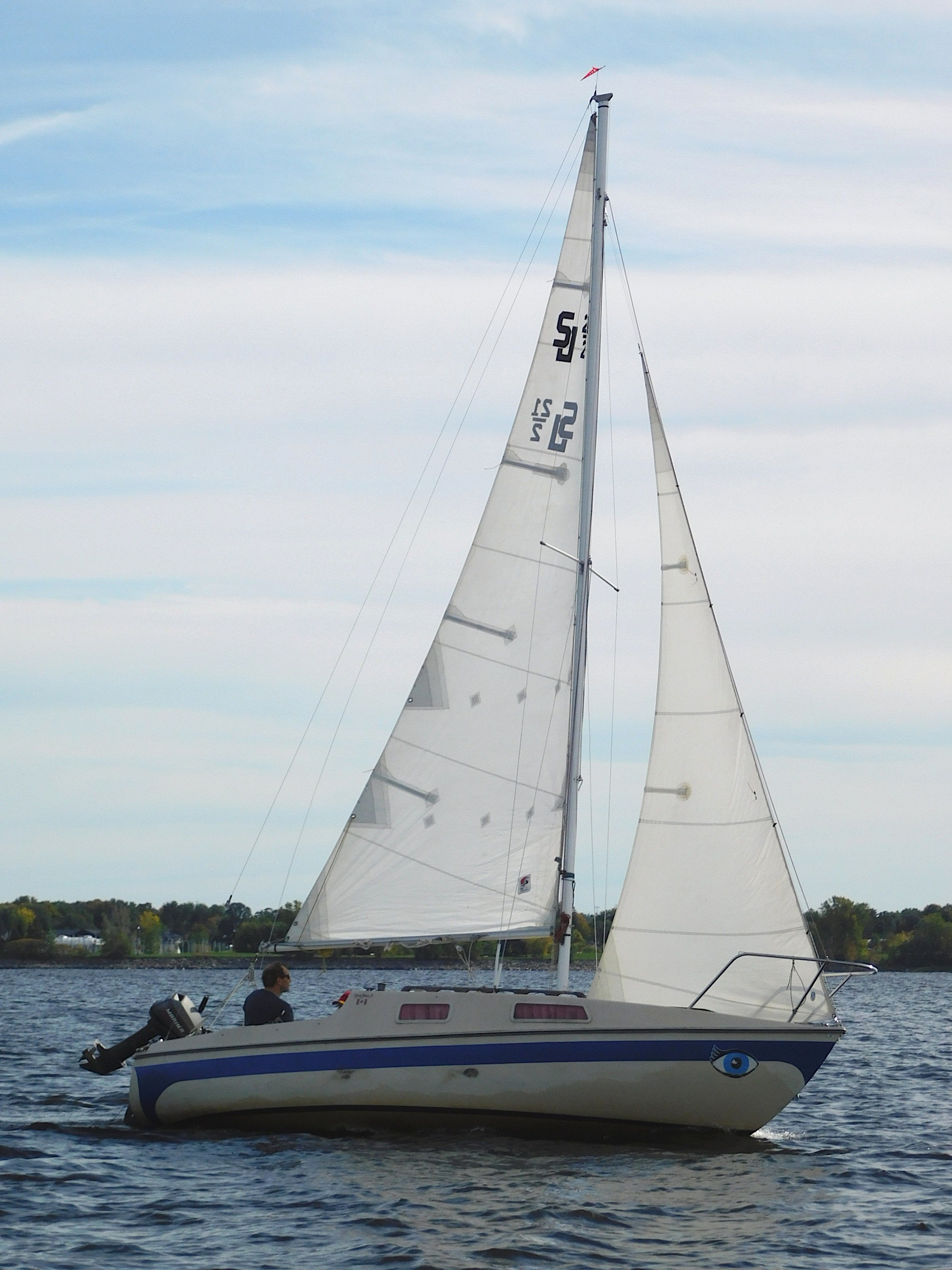
- San Juan 21-2

Development
- Designer: Don Clark
- Location: United States
- Year: 1970
- No. built: 2600 (all models)
- Builder: Clark Boat Company
- Role: cruiser-racer
- Name: San Juan 21-2

Boat
- Displacement: 1,250 lb (567 kg)
- Draft: 4.00 ft (1.22 m) with centerboard down

Hull
- Type: Monohull
- Construction: Fiberglass
- LOA: 20.50 ft (6.25 m)
- LWL: 17.50 ft (5.33 m)
- Beam: 7.00 ft (2.13 m)
- Engine: Outboard motor

Hull appendages
- Keel: centerboard
- Ballast: 400 lb (181 kg)
- Rudder: transom-mounted rudder

Rig
- Rig type: Bermuda rig
- I foretriangle height: 22.50 ft (6.86 m)
- J foretriangle base: 8.21 ft (2.50 m)
- P mainsail luff: 23.00 ft (7.01 m)
- E mainsail foot: 8.75 ft (2.67 m)

Sails
- Sailplan: Fractional rigged sloop
- Mainsail area: 100.63 sq ft (9.349 m^{2})
- Jib/genoa area: 92.36 sq ft (8.581 m^{2})
- Total sail area: 192.99 sq ft (17.929 m^{2})

Racing
- PHRF: 252 (average)

The San Juan 21 is a recreational keelboat built by the Clark Boat Company in Kent, Washington, United States, as well as eventually opening a facility in New Bern, North Carolina, but it is now out of production. A total of 2600 San Juan 21s were completed.

The design was introduced at the 1970 Seattle Boat Show and was well received.

== Design ==
The San Juan 21 is built predominantly of fiberglass with a balsa-cored cabin and wood trim. It has a fractional sloop rig, a raked stem, a slightly reverse transom, a transom-hung rudder controlled by a tiller and a centerboard keel.

The boat has a draft of 4.00 ft (1.22 m) with the centerboard extended and 1.00 ft (0.30 m) with it retracted, allowing beaching or ground transportation on a trailer.

The boat is normally fitted with a small 2 to 6 hp (1 to 4 kW) outboard motor for docking and maneuvering with racing oriented owners preferring lighter weight outboards as the boat is sensitive to weight astern.

The design has sleeping accommodation for four people, with a double "V"-berth in the bow cabin and two quarter berths in the main cabin under the cockpit. The head is located just aft of the bow cabin on the starboard side. Cabin headroom is 42 in (107 cm).

For sailing downwind the design may be equipped with a symmetrical spinnaker.

The design has a hull speed of 5.52 kn (10.22 km/h).

== Variants ==
=== San Juan 21 or Mark I ===
This model was introduced in 1970 and produced until 1977. It has a length overall of 20.50 ft (6.2 m), a waterline length of 17.50 ft (5.3 m), the design displacement was 1,250 lb (567 kg), but production displacement turned out to be 1,400 lb (635 kg). It carries 400 lb (181 kg) of ballast. The boat has a PHRF racing average handicap of 252 with a high of 246 and low of 258.

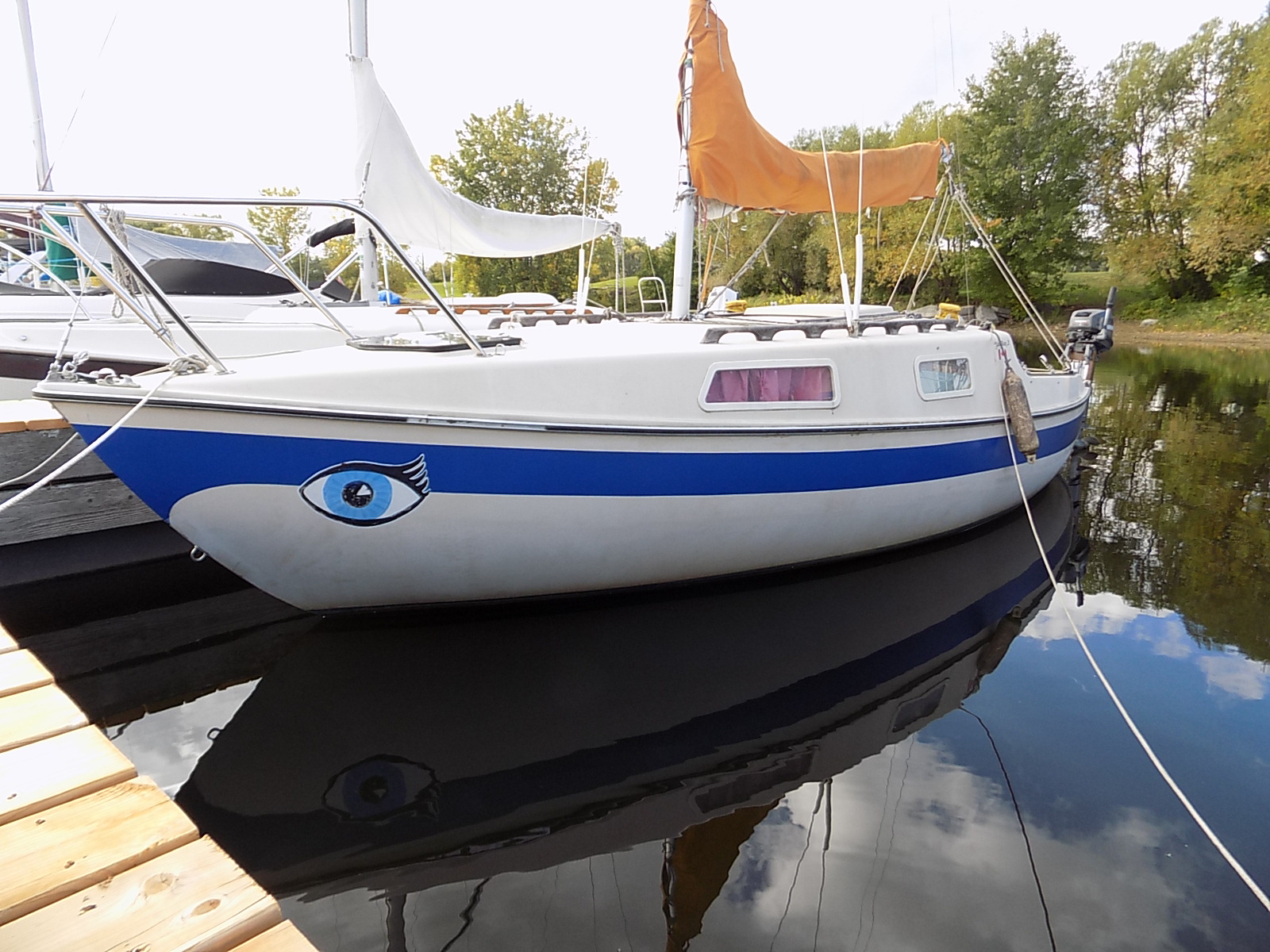
San Juan 21-2

=== San Juan 21-2 or Mark II ===
This model was introduced in 1974 after about 1,000 of the Mark Is had been built. The Mark II has a raised deck over top of the cabin and has a smaller cockpit, with a commensurately larger cabin. The Mark II was produced alongside the Mark I until Mark I production ended in 1977. It has a length overall of 20.50 ft (6.2 m), a waterline length of 17.50 ft (5.3 m), displaces 1,250 lb (567 kg) and carries 400 lb (181 kg) of ballast. The boat has a PHRF racing average handicap of 252 with a high of 267 and low of 240.

=== San Juan Mark III ===
This model was the last update and uses the same Cabin top and Hull as the Mark II but, has a different pan arrangement inside the cabin as well as removal of the aft mounted lazarette on boats produced on the east coast, while west coast boats retained the lazarette.:

== Reception ==
In a 2010 review Steve Henkel wrote, "the SJ21 has a very active racing association, unusual for a boat designed 30-plus years ago. An efficient foil-shaped rudder and swing keel, plus a sailcloth slot gasket, offer superior hydrodynamics compared with her comps. Worst features: The slot gasket, made of sailcloth (which bridges the gap across the trunk slot to prevent turbulence when sailing downwind with the keel raised), requires special maintenance (trimming of frayed edges and periodic replacement) to keep it smooth and effective. The advertised weight of 1,250 pounds may be low; some owners claim weights of 1,500 to 1,750 pounds."
