= Sandpiper 565 =

1970s recreational keelboat

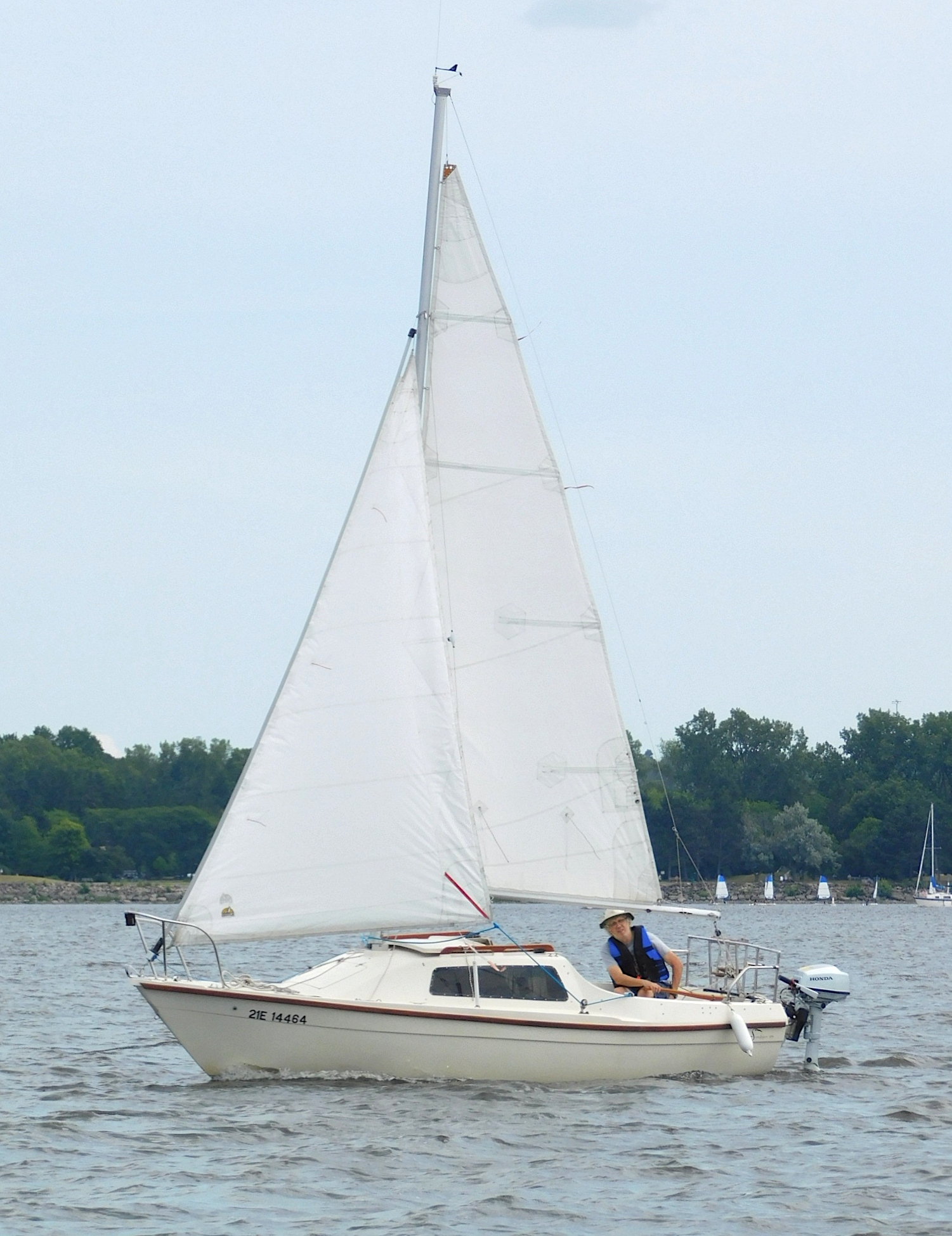

Development
- Designer: Leonardo da Costa Sayago
- Location: United Kingdom
- Year: 1972
- No. built: 1500
- Builders: Sandpiper Marine; C&L Boatworks

Boat
- Displacement: 1,200 lb (544 kg)
- Draft: 2.90 ft (0.88 m) keel down

Hull
- Type: Monohull
- Construction: Glassfibre
- LOA: 18.50 ft (5.64 m)
- LWL: 15.00 ft (4.57 m)
- Beam: 7.08 ft (2.16 m)

Hull appendages
- Keel: lifting keel
- Ballast: 300 lb (136 kg)
- Rudder: transom-mounted rudder

Rig
- General: Fractional rigged sloop
- I foretriangle height: 23.50 ft (7.16 m)
- J foretriangle base: 7.00 ft (2.13 m)
- P mainsail luff: 18.00 ft (5.49 m)
- E mainsail foot: 8.00 ft (2.44 m)

Sails
- Mainsail area: 72.00 sq ft (6.689 m^{2})
- Jib/genoa area: 82.25 sq ft (7.641 m^{2})
- Total sail area: 154.25 sq ft (14.330 m^{2})

The Sandpiper 565 is trailerable sailboat that was designed by the British-based Portuguese naval architect Leonardo da Costa Sayago and first built in 1972. The design is out of production.

== Production ==
The boat was built by Sandpiper Marine of Southampton, England, United Kingdom and C&L Boatworks in Canada, with a total of 1500 completed.

Royalties were not paid by C&L Boatworks to produce the design.

The design was also produced under license in Sweden as the Ockelbo OS 19.

== Design ==
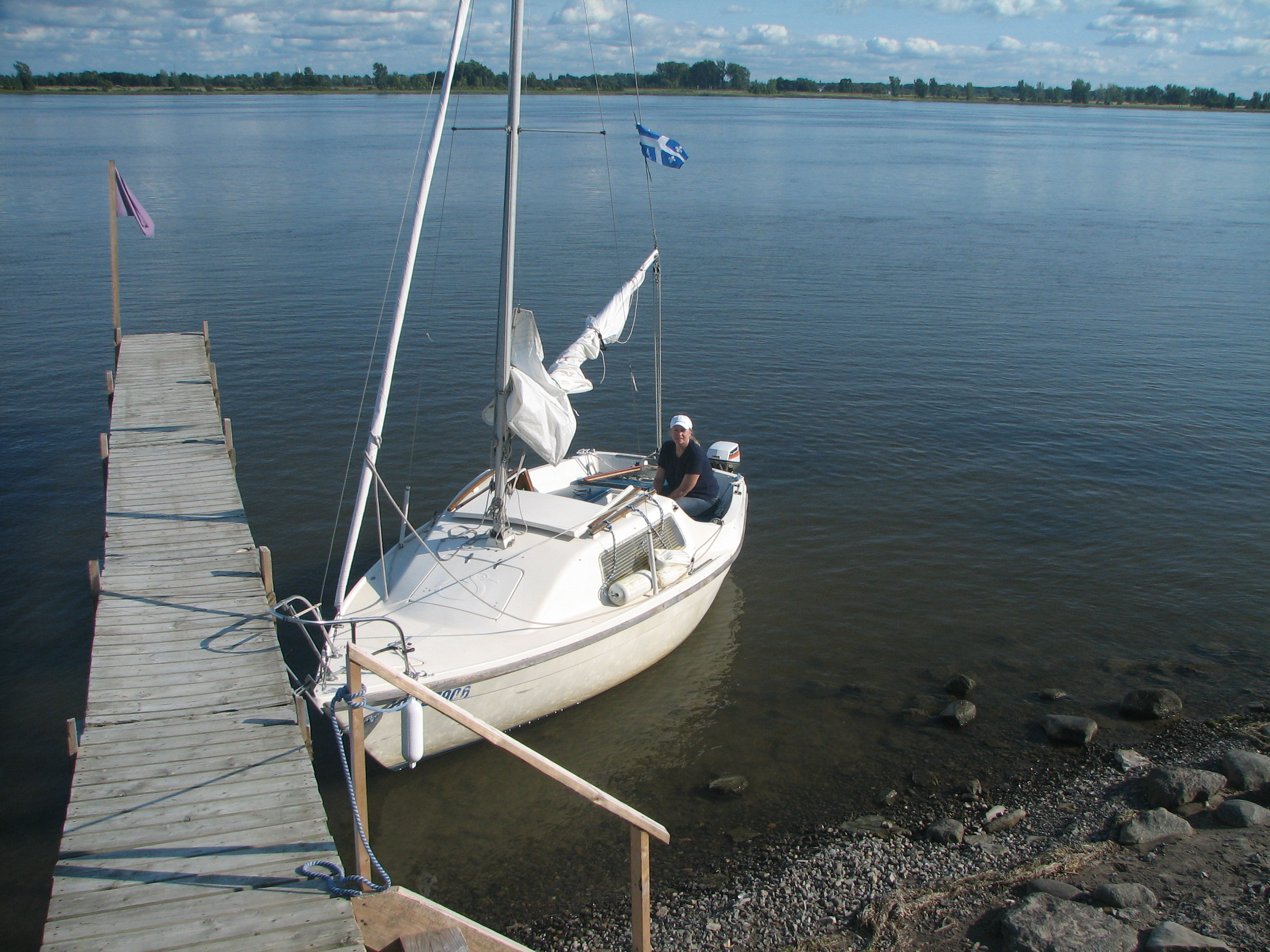
A Sandpiper 565 mooring with the keel up, in shallow water

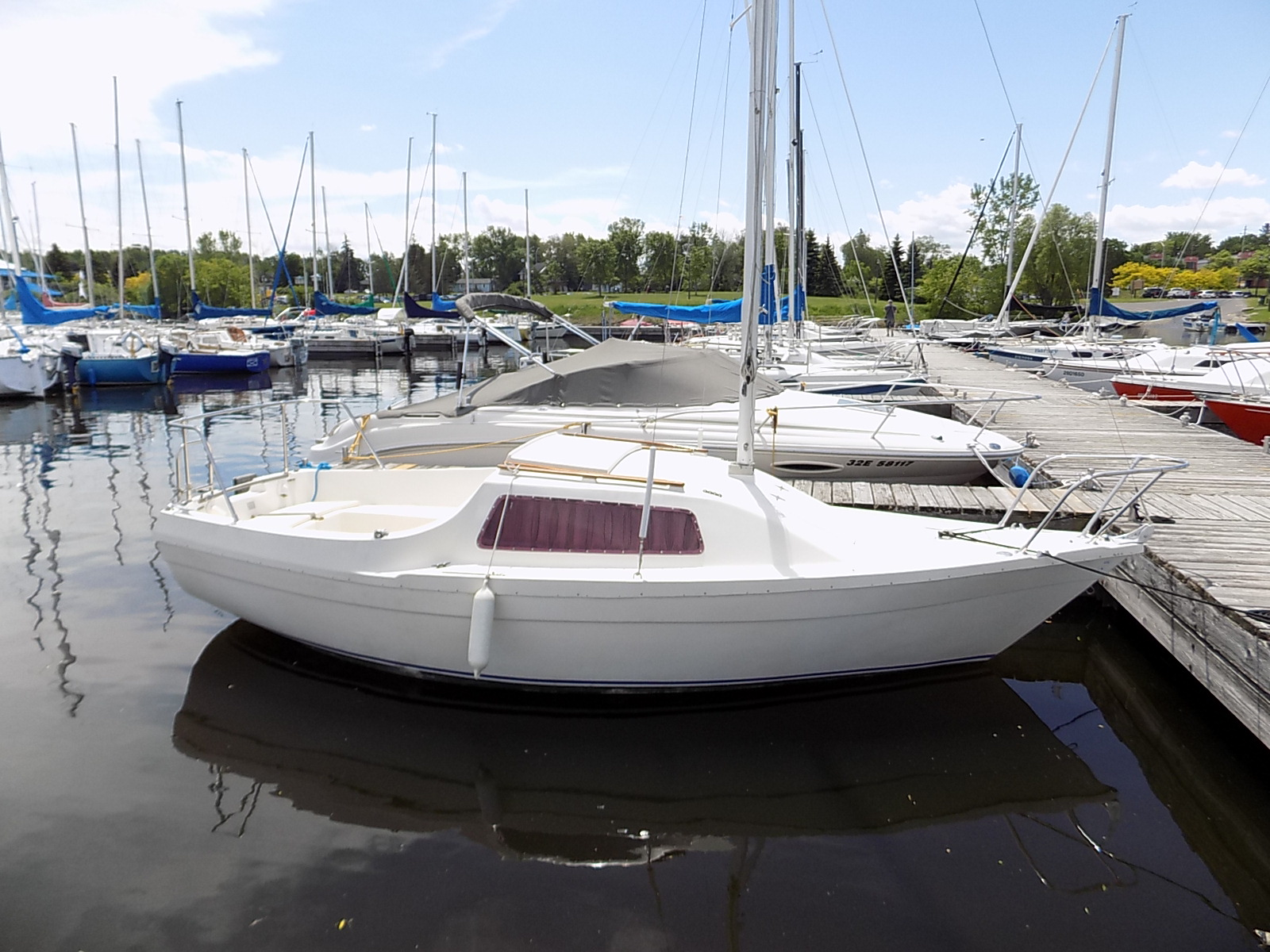
Sandpiper 565

The Sandpiper 565 is a small recreational keelboat, built predominantly of glassfibre, with wood trim. It has a fractional sloop rig, a transom-hung rudder and a retractable fin keel. It displaces 1,200 lb (544 kg) and carries 300 lb (136 kg) of iron ballast.

The boat has a draft of 2.90 ft (0.88 m) with the keel down and 0.83 ft (0.25 m) with the keel retracted.

The boat has hull speed of 5.19 kn (9.61 km/h).

The design includes a high freeboard and a deep cockpit. It has sleeping accommodation for two adults and two small children below decks. The Sandpiper 565 was designed to be transported on a trailer towed by an automobile. With its fully retractable daggerboard keel it can operate in shallow water, including being easily beached.

== Reception ==
In a review Michael McGoldrick wrote, "The Sandpiper's cabin has some real lounging space and plenty of room to sleep two adults, and possibly one or two young children. (The advertising literature claims that this boat can sleep 4 adults, which, strictly speaking, is true). This boat does have a fairly small cockpit, and with a total weight of 1200 pounds, it is starting to be a heavy load to pull behind a family car."

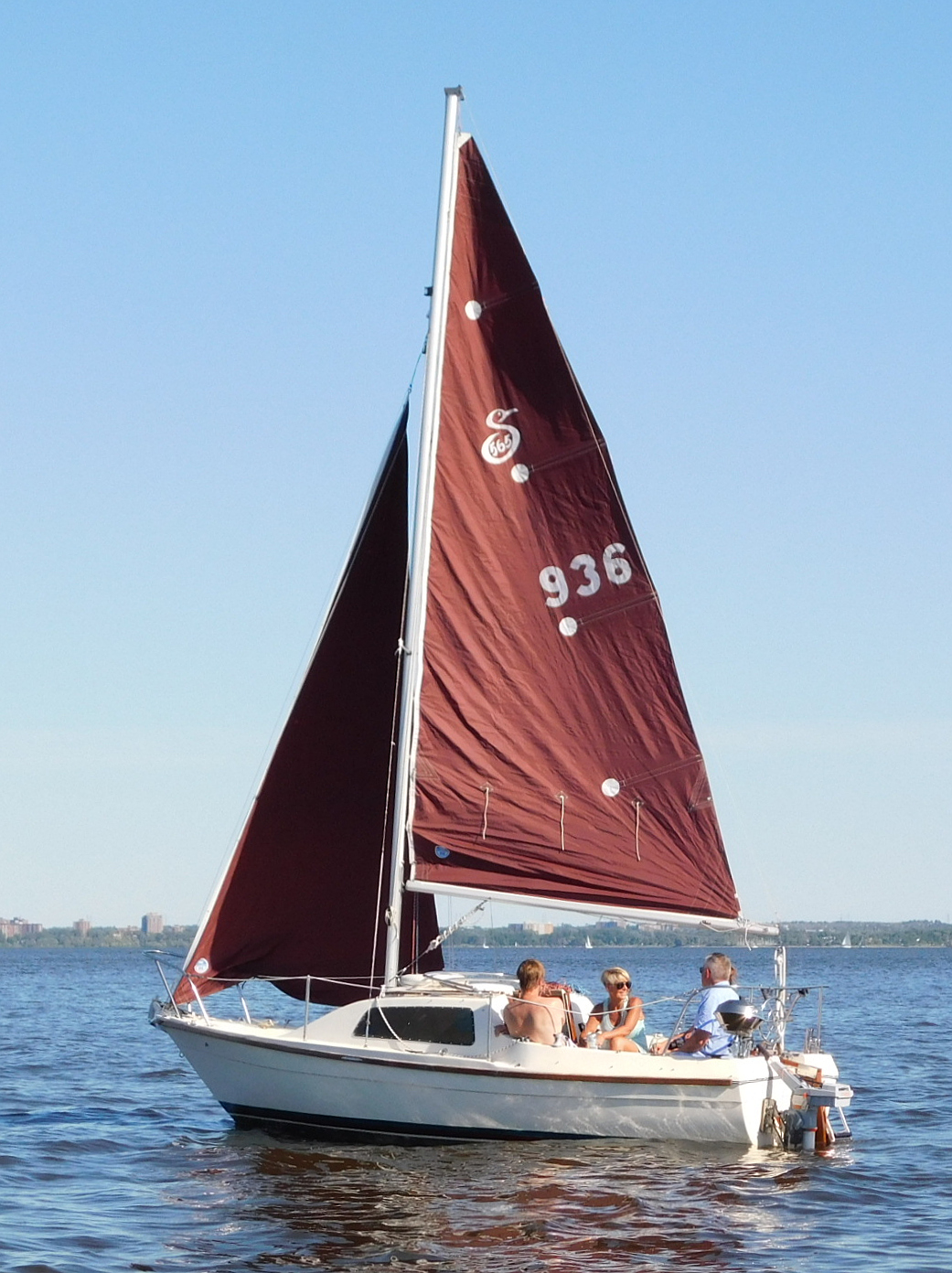
Sandpiper 565
