= Red Witch =

Australian trailable yacht

- A Red Witch on a spinnaker run

Development
- Year: 1972
- Design: Per Brohall
- Name: Red Witch

Boat
- Crew: 1 to 4
- Draft: 1.27 metres (4 ft 2 in)

Hull
- Type: Monohull keelboat
- Construction: Fibreglass
- LOA: 10.16 metres (33.3 ft)
- LWL: 5.94 metres (19.5 ft)
- Beam: 2.33 metres (7 ft 8 in)

Sails
- Total sail area: 16 metres (52 ft)

A Red Witch is a shallow draught 19.5-foot (5.9 m) trailerable, fixed keel yacht, designed to fit under major bridges on the Swan River in Western Australia.

== Design ==
A Red Witch on its side on a boat ramp, showing its keel

The hull and cabin are made out of glass-reinforced plastic, the keel is cast iron and the rudder is wooden, originally with a rudder box, or replaced with GRP as owners upgrade. The transom has space for an outboard bracket and a ladder. It is virtually unsinkable, as it has airtight cavities in the cabin.

The Red Witch was designed by Per Brohall and built by Hill & Cameron Yachts Perth in the 1970s, using as its inspiration a 22-foot (6.7 m) "Seal" yacht from England. It was subsequently further developed to produce a "Sorcerer" 20 feet 6 inches (6.25 m) to cater for the local Division IV category. Unfortunately for the Sorcerer, the Red Witch eclipsed sales and was faster, thus it became the dominant 'Red' in racing circles, and an active class Association was formed in 1973.

== Racing ==
The boats are sailed as a separate division at South of Perth Yacht Club. Small fleets of boats are found at Claremont, Nedlands, East Fremantle, Cruising (Rockingham) Yacht Clubs, Hillarys Sailing Club and Koombana Bay Sailing Club (Bunbury) and some have even found their way to the eastern states (such as Canberra and Lake Macquarie). Many Red Witches live on their trailers in the suburbs, as they are compact and easily stored—there are 33 yachts registered with the Red Witch Association, and over 240 were manufactured.

== See also ==
- List of sailing boat types

Similar sailboats

- Austral 20 (trailer sailer)
- Boomerang 20
- Careel 18
- Hartley TS16
- MacGregor 26
- RL 24
- Santana 22
- Sonata 26
