= Venture 22 =

Late 1960s American trailer sailer

- V 22

Development
- Designer: Roger MacGregor
- Location: United States
- Year: 1968
- Builder: MacGregor Yacht Corporation
- Role: Cruiser
- Name: Venture 22

Boat
- Displacement: 1,600 lb (726 kg)
- Draft: 4.50 ft (1.37 m) with keel down

Hull
- Type: monohull
- Construction: fiberglass
- LOA: 22.00 ft (6.71 m)
- LWL: 19.50 ft (5.94 m)
- Beam: 7.33 ft (2.23 m)
- Engine: outboard motor

Hull appendages
- Keel: swing keel
- Ballast: 475 lb (215 kg)
- Rudder: transom-mounted rudder

Rig
- Rig type: Bermuda rig
- I foretriangle height: 24.67 ft (7.52 m)
- J foretriangle base: 9.08 ft (2.77 m)
- P mainsail luff: 21.83 ft (6.65 m)
- E mainsail foot: 9.75 ft (2.97 m)

Sails
- Sailplan: masthead sloop
- Mainsail area: 106.42 sq ft (9.887 m^{2})
- Jib/genoa area: 112.00 sq ft (10.405 m^{2})
- Total sail area: 218.42 sq ft (20.292 m^{2})

Racing
- PHRF: 258

The Venture 22 is a recreational keelboat built in the United States, from 1968 to 1971 by MacGregor Yacht Corporation who also built the similar MacGregor 22 Venture 222.

Designed by Roger MacGregor, the fiberglass hull has raked stem, a slightly angled transom, a transom-hung rudder controlled by a tiller and a retractable swing keel. It has positive foam flotation making it unsinkable. The boat has a draft of 4.50 ft (1.37 m) with the keel extended and 8 in (20 cm) with it retracted. It has a hull speed of 5.7 kn (10.6 km/h).

It is equipped with a "pop-top" to increase cabin headroom and sleeping accommodation for five people, with a double "V"-berth in the bow cabin, drop-down dinette table that forms a small double berth on the starboard side of the main cabin and an aft quarter berth on the port side. The galley is located on the port side just aft of the bow cabin. The galley is equipped with a two-burner stove and a sink. The head is located in the bow cabin on the port side under the "V"-berth. Cabin headroom is 48 in (122 cm) or 73 in (185 cm) with the pop-top open.

It has a masthead sloop rig.

== Reception ==
In a 2010 review Steve Henkel wrote, "here is a vessel designed to satisfy the Great American public's desire for a simple, low cost sailboat big enough to cruise a family of four (or five in a pinch), at least for a weekend. The hull walls are thin, the hardware is so-so, but the boat does not pretend to be a 'yacht' (despite the word 'yacht' in the name of the manufacturer), and the formula worked. As early as 1970 the company's ads said 'There are more Ventures sold than any other cruising sailboat. The price is low. The trailer is your mooring. And ... the wind is free.' Best features: Very shallow draft plus a low-slung trailer, sold with the boat, that makes launching and retrieving as easy as it gets. A fold-down poptop and button-on canvas weather curtains provide interior space with 6' 1" headroom when at anchor or when sailing in a light breeze. Foam flotation under the cockpit and the forward V-berth make the boat unsinkable despite the weight of her 460-pound swing keel. And we like the dinette, which converts to a so-called 'double' about 3' 4" wide and barely 6' long. Worst features: Did I mention cheap construction? Well you can't have everything."
