= MacGregor 21 =

Sailboat class

- M

Development
- Designer: Roger MacGregor
- Location: United States
- Year: 1980
- Builder: MacGregor Yacht Corporation
- Role: Racer-Cruiser

Boat
- Displacement: 1,175 lb (533 kg)
- Draft: 5.50 ft (1.68 m) with the keel down

Hull
- Type: monohull
- Construction: fiberglass
- LOA: 21.00 ft (6.40 m)
- LWL: 18.50 ft (5.64 m)
- Beam: 6.83 ft (2.08 m)
- Engine: outboard motor

Hull appendages
- Keel: swing keel
- Ballast: 400 lb (181 kg)
- Rudder: transom-mounted rudder

Rig
- Rig type: Bermuda rig
- I foretriangle height: 24.30 ft (7.41 m)
- J foretriangle base: 7.50 ft (2.29 m)
- P mainsail luff: 23.00 ft (7.01 m)
- E mainsail foot: 10.00 ft (3.05 m)

Sails
- Sailplan: masthead sloop
- Mainsail area: 115.00 sq ft (10.684 m^{2})
- Jib/genoa area: 91.13 sq ft (8.466 m^{2})
- Total sail area: 206.13 sq ft (19.150 m^{2})

Racing
- PHRF: 252

The MacGregor 21 is an American trailerable sailboat that was designed by Roger MacGregor as a racer-cruiser and first built in 1980.

The MacGregor 21 is a development of the Venture 21.

== Production ==
The design was built by MacGregor Yacht Corporation in the United States, from 1980 until 1985, but it is now out of production.

== Design ==
The MacGregor 21 is a recreational keelboat, built predominantly of fiberglass, with wood trim. It has a masthead sloop rig, a spooned raked stem, a slightly angled transom, a transom-hung rudder controlled by a tiller and a retractable swing keel. It displaces 1,175 lb (533 kg) and carries 400 lb (181 kg) of cast iron ballast.

The boat has a draft of 5.50 ft (1.68 m) with the swing keel extended and 12 in (30 cm) with it retracted, allowing operation in shallow water or ground transportation on a trailer.

The boat is normally fitted with a small 3 to 6 hp (2 to 4 kW) outboard motor for docking and maneuvering.

The design has sleeping accommodation for four people, with a double "V"-berth in the bow cabin and two straight settee berths in the main cabin. Cabin headroom is 39 in (99 cm).

The design has a PHRF racing average handicap of 252 and a hull speed of 5.8 kn (10.7 km/h).

== See also ==
- List of sailing boat types

Related development

- Venture 21
