= Scouting and Guiding in Western Australia =

Scouting in Western Australia is predominantly represented by a branch of Scouts Australia and Girl Guides Western Australia, a member organisation of Girl Guides Australia.

Scouting began in Western Australia in 1908 when eighteen-year-old Frank Roche from Spearwood established the first Scout Patrol. By the end of 1909 there were 416 members in 16 groups. In 1912, the Founder, Robert Baden-Powell visited Perth.

Girl Guides started in Western Australia in 1915 in a very formal way when the Women's Service Guild staged a public meeting, under Vice Regal patronage, in the Perth Town Hall on 28 June 1915. The governor moved, "that a Girl Guide Association be formed in this State and that we apply to the Girl Guide Association of Great Britain for a warrant".

== Scouts Australia ==
Western Australia
- Owner: Scouts Australia
- Headquarters: 133 Scarborough Beach Road, Mount Hawthorn WA 6016
- Country: Australia
- Coordinates: 31.922215°S 115.840292°E
- Membership: 7,200
- Chief Scout (WA): Chris Dawson
- Chief Commissioner: Gavin Satie
- Website scoutswa.com.au

The Branch is organised around districts:

Perth North Region

- Bilgoman District
- Central Swan District
- Joondalup District
- Kalamunda District
- Minderup District
- Swan Valley District
- Nookenburra District
- Wanneroo District

Perth South Region

- Beeliar District
- Beeloo District
- Canning River District
- Melville District
- Minnawarra District
- Osprey District
- River Ranges District
- Three Rivers District

Country Region

- Goldfields District
- Midwest District
- Nyingarn District
- Pilbara District
- Stirling District
- Southern Forest District
- Wellington District

=== Activities ===
A Scout Gang Show started in Perth in 1962 (and currently in recess). Two Australian Scout Jamborees were held in Western Australia in 1979/80 and 1994/95.

Sea Scouts in Western Australia are active. The premier Sea Scout Competition in Western Australia is the Master Mariners competition. The Junior Shield is currently held by Canning Sea Scouts, the Senior Shield by Canning Venturer Sea Scouts and the Rover Oar by Pelican Point Rover Crew. There are currently 10 sea scout groups in Western Australia.

There is a Scout Water Activity Centre located in Como that land-based groups can use. An annual regatta is held there.

=== Scouts Western Australia Adventure Centres ===
- Scouts WA Adventure Centre Eaton. On the banks of the Collie River at Eaton in the Shire of Dardanup, just 8 kilometres (5 mi) from Bunbury.
- Scouts WA Adventure Centre Gilcreek. On the bank of the King River, 12 kilometres (7.5 mi) from Albany.
- Scouts WA Adventure Centre Manjedal. Near Byford about one hour drive from Perth is the Branch's major Camp Site and Training Centre, established in 1967.
- Scouts WA Adventure Centre Vasse 280 kilometres (170 mi) south west of Perth near Busselton.

=== Other facilities ===
- Northam Scout Camp. 97 kilometres (60 mi) east of Perth and 4.5 kilometres (2.8 mi) west of Northam. The campsite's southern boundary is the north side of the Kep Track, which follows the Goldfields Pipeline in the area and is used for hiking, walking, cycling, and horse riding.
- Scout Water Activity Centre, in Como, near Canning Bridge in Perth.

=== Major branch events ===
- OneCamp: a new event for April 2023, for all sections for one major camp, for the Swan Valley Adventure Centre. It is now a recurring event after another was held in April of 2026 at the same location.
- Nighthawk: A night-time orienteering event for Scouts.
- Rottosplash: Held every year at Rottnest Island where Scouts and Venturers do community service.
- Youth awards: New Australian Scout Award, King's Scout Award, Baden-Powell Scout Award and Scout of the Year Award recipients every February are presented their certificate by the Chief Commissioner and Chief Scout.
- Campwest: Previously held every three years, Campwest was a small scale jamboree, held between Australian jamborees, with the last event occurring in 2021. Campwest has been replaced by OneCamp.

The following are the major competitions that are held in Western Australia.

Scouts

- Cargeeg Challenge Shield (Scouts) – the Premier Camping competition in Western Australia for Scouts at Manjedal Scout Centre, is currently held by Donny Brook Scouts Troop.
- Master Mariners Junior Shield (Scouts) – the Premier Boating competition in Western Australia for Scouts, is currently held by Canning Sea Scouts.
- Swan Tiki – a Bi-annual Rafting event for Scout section, the overall trophy is currently held by Bibra Lake Scouts.
- Orienteering – held annually at a national park in Perth. There are many categories in which teams compete to collect the most points.

Venturer Scouts

- Master Mariners Senior Shield – premier boating competition in Western Australia for Venturers, currently held by Fremantle Venturer Sea Scouts.
- Mission Impossible
- Vencarna is a car event similar to the Rover Baja Car Rally.

Rovers

- Master Mariner Rover Oar, a premier boating competition in Western Australia for rovers, is currently held by Pelican Point Rover Sea Scouts.
- Mission Impossible.
- Rover Motor Sports, the Rover Baja Car Rally.

Water Activities/Sea Scouts (involving more than one section)

- Swan-A-Bout, the 30 hours sailing Marathon for the Scout section and above. The overall trophy is currently held by Canning Sea Scouts. Waylen Bay Sea Scouts holds the dinghy, seaboat and keelboat classes while Canning Sea Scouts hold the catamaran and Red witch classes.
- Pelican Point Regatta is held bi-annually with other Sea Scout troops holding the regatta every second year. The last regatta was held as Waylen Bay Regatta in 2006. The shield is currently held by the Waylen Bay Sea Scouts.
- Como Regatta: The annual regatta is held at Scout Water Activity Centre at Como. The trophy is currently held by Waylen Bay Sea Scouts.
- Rowing Record: There is rowing challenge open to all Scouts and Venturers. It is between Nedlands and Applecross jetty. The current holders are the Waylen Bay Venturers, setting the record in 1984 in the sea boat Lyn Ward.

=== History ===
In 2015, Western Australia's biggest scout group's meeting place and hall (1st Mandurah Scouts) was bulldozed, after the City of Mandurah sold the property (to supermarket giant Aldi).

=== Executive Leadership Team ===
The Executive Leadership Team (ELT) comprises people from a range of vocational backgrounds. The ELT hold positions that provide direction and support to members. The current ELT began their 3 year terms on 1 July 2026 and are as below:

- Chief Commissioner Scouts WA: Gavin Satie, JP
- Deputy Chief Commissioner Scouts WA: Jane Hamilton
- Assistant Chief Commissioner Professional Standards: Vacant
- Assistant Chief Commissioner Marketing and Communications: Jack Leighton-Jones
- Assistant Chief Commissioner Support Services: Jack Lambert
- Assistant Chief Commissioner Learning and Development: Jason Thomson
- Assistant Chief Commissioner Safety Environment and Wellbeing: Peta Baer
- Assistant Chief Commissioner Program Support: Sharni Jagger
- Assistant Chief Commissioner Youth Empowerment: Oliver Murfin
- Assistant Chief Commissioner Operations: Danelle Fauntletoy
- Executive Manager Scouts WA: Dougal Mayor

== Girl Guiding Western Australia ==
Girl Guides Western Australia
- Headquarters: Belmont, Western Australia
- Country: Australia
- Founded: 28 June 1914
- Membership: 2,600
- State Commissioner: Linda Elezovich
- Affiliation: Girl Guides Australia; World Association of Girl Guides and Girl Scouts
- Website www.girlguideswa.org.au

Girl Guides Western Australia is one of the seven member organisations of Girl Guides Australia. Girl Guides WA has around 2,600 members.

Girl Guide units operate throughout the state and are organised into regions:

- North Metro
- Joondalup
- Whitfords Coastal
- Seaward
- Darling Swan
- Peel
- River SeaWay
- Southern Foothills
- Capricorn
- Avon Hills
- Great Southern
- Three Rivers

=== Centenary ===
From 28 June 2014 to 28 June 2015, Girl Guides WA celebrated 100 years of Guiding in Western Australia. A number of events and special projects were organised for the occasion, including a Centenary Dinner for adult members, past members and supporters, "Jamboree with a Difference" and collection of information for the state archives.

=== Our Barn ===
Girl Guides WA operates "Our Barn" in York. The original building on the property is from the Victorian Era and was originally the stables of Haversham House. It has a rich history, and was used by the Red Cross in World War II as a convalescent home for the armed services. "Our Barn" was converted into a dormitory by Girl Guides WA in the 1970s and officially opened as a Guide Property in 1977.

== See also ==
- Scouting and Guiding in Australia
