= Ultimate 20 =

One-design racing keelboat

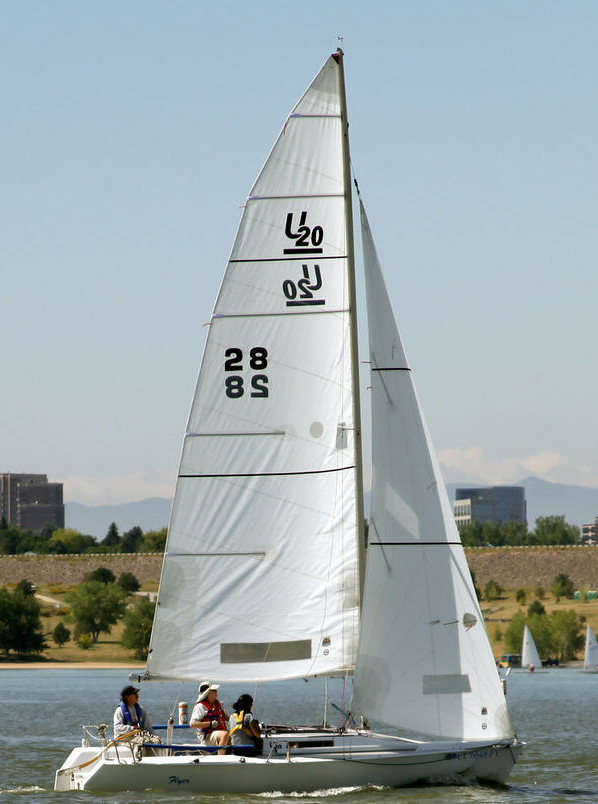

Development
- Designer: Jim Antrim; Jeff Canepa
- Location: United States
- Year: 1994
- Builders: Abbott Boats; Columbia Yachts; Moore Sailboats; Santa Cruz Yachts; W. D. Schock Corp; Ultimate Sailboats
- Role: One design racer
- Name: Ultimate 20

Boat
- Displacement: 1,100 lb (499 kg)
- Draft: 5.00 ft (1.52 m) with keel down

Hull
- Type: monohull
- Construction: fiberglass
- LOA: 20.83 ft (6.35 m)
- LWL: 18.00 ft (5.49 m)
- Beam: 8.00 ft (2.44 m)
- Engine: outboard motor

Hull appendages
- Keel: lifting keel
- Ballast: 450 lb (204 kg)
- Rudder: transom-mounted rudder

Rig
- Rig type: Bermuda rig
- I foretriangle height: 26.08 ft (7.95 m)
- J foretriangle base: 6.96 ft (2.12 m)
- P mainsail luff: 27.32 ft (8.33 m)
- E mainsail foot: 10.25 ft (3.12 m)

Sails
- Sailplan: fractional rigged sloop
- Mainsail area: 140.02 sq ft (13.008 m^{2})
- Jib/genoa area: 90.76 sq ft (8.432 m^{2})
- Total sail area: 230.77 sq ft (21.439 m^{2})

Racing
- PHRF: 138-159

The Ultimate 20 is a one design keelboat built in the United States starting in 1994 in California by Moore Sailboats, which built the first 35 boats. Santa Cruz Yachts then built about 20 more, before production was assumed by Ultimate Sailboats until it went bankrupt. The class association then bought the molds and had the design built by Abbott Boats in Canada. After Abbott's plant was destroyed by fire in 2006, production was passed to Columbia Yachts, but few boats were completed. It was last constructed by W. D. Schock Corp, starting in the 2010s.

Designed by Jim Antrim and Jeff Canepa The boat was conceived by Hobie Cat champion sailor Jeff Canepa in the late 1980s. He was interested in the work done by Doug Hemphill, the designer of the Hotfoot 20 and Hotfoot 27 sailboats and especially his desire to add a bowsprit and asymmetrical spinnaker to the Hotfoot 20. Canepa ended up buying the Hotfoot 20 molds at a sheriff's auction. In 1993 he formed Ultimate Sailboats and started to work on an evolved design. Ron Moore of Moore Sailboats built a prototype from the Hotfoot molds and it was taken on a racing tour by John McWaid, where he gathered feedback. Next naval architect Jim Antrim was enlisted to do an overhaul of the original Hotfoot 20 design. The boat was lengthened and the freeboard, mast height and beam increased. Swept spreaders and a jib roller furler were incorporated, the sail area increased, along with a redesigned keel. The coach house and deck were also redesigned.

It is built predominantly of vinylester and polyester fiberglass with a 0.375 in (9.5 mm) core of Baltek balsa, a raked stem, an open reverse transom, a transom-hung rudder controlled by a tiller and a lifting keel with a weighted bulb. The rudder is made from carbon fiber and fiberglass, with wooden reinforcement. The keel is raised and lowered by a winch.

The boat has a draft of 5.00 ft (1.52 m) with the keel extended and 0.67 ft (0.20 m) with it retracted.

It has sleeping accommodation for four people, with a double "V"-berth in the bow cabin and a two straight settees in the main cabin.

It has a fractional sloop and may be equipped with an asymmetrical spinnaker flown from the deck-mounted retractable bowsprit.

It has a hull speed of 5.69 kn (10.54 km/h) .

In a 1995 review for Practical Sailor, Darrell Nicholson wrote, "the boat is fairly forgiving but you have to think fast."

In a 2013 Sailing World review Dave Reed wrote, "it offers one thing flashier new boats don't have: simplicity."

It was named Sailing World's 1995 Boat of the Year in the PHRF/Sportboat category.
