= MacGregor 25 =

Popular American 25-foot trailer sailer

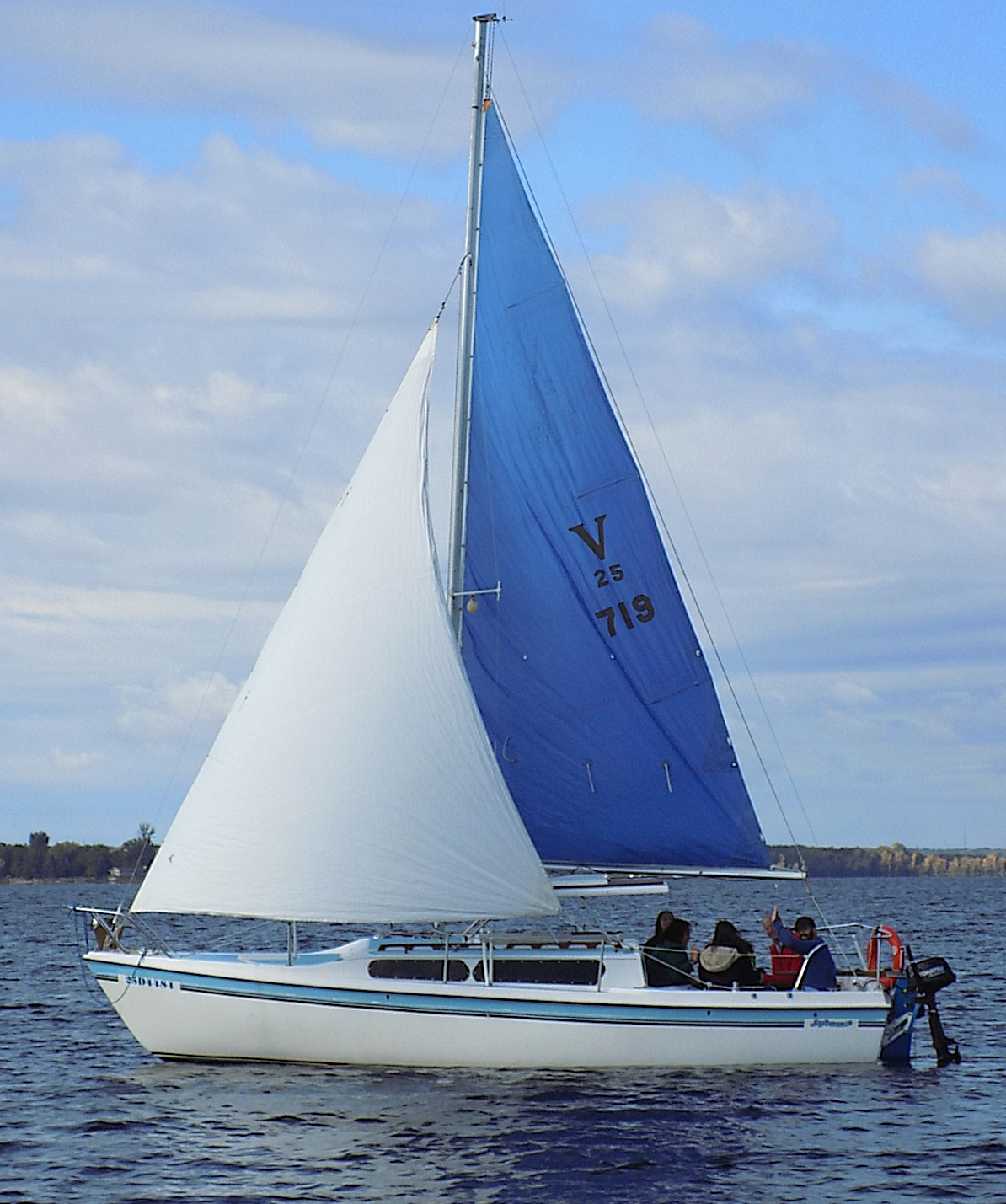

Development
- Designer: Roger MacGregor
- Location: United States
- Year: 1973
- No. built: 7,000
- Builder: MacGregor Yacht Corporation
- Name: MacGregor 25

Boat
- Displacement: 2,100 lb (953 kg)
- Draft: 5.67 ft (1.73 m) with centerboard down

Hull
- Type: Monohull
- Construction: Fiberglass
- LOA: 25.00 ft (7.62 m)
- LWL: 23.00 ft (7.01 m)
- Beam: 7.92 ft (2.41 m)
- Engine: Outboard motor

Hull appendages
- Keel: stub keel with centerboard
- Ballast: 625 lb (283 kg)
- Rudder: transom-mounted rudder

Rig
- General: Fractional rigged sloop
- I foretriangle height: 25.00 ft (7.62 m)
- J foretriangle base: 9.75 ft (2.97 m)
- P mainsail luff: 24.50 ft (7.47 m)
- E mainsail foot: 10.50 ft (3.20 m)

Sails
- Mainsail area: 128.63 sq ft (11.950 m^{2})
- Jib/genoa area: 121.88 sq ft (11.323 m^{2})
- Total sail area: 250.50 sq ft (23.272 m^{2})

The MacGregor 25 is an American trailerable sailboat that was first built in 1973. From the start of production until 1980, it was sold as the Venture 25.

== Production ==
The boat was built by MacGregor Yacht Corporation in the United States between 1973 and 1987, but it is now out of production. During its 14-year production run 7,000 examples were completed.

== Design ==
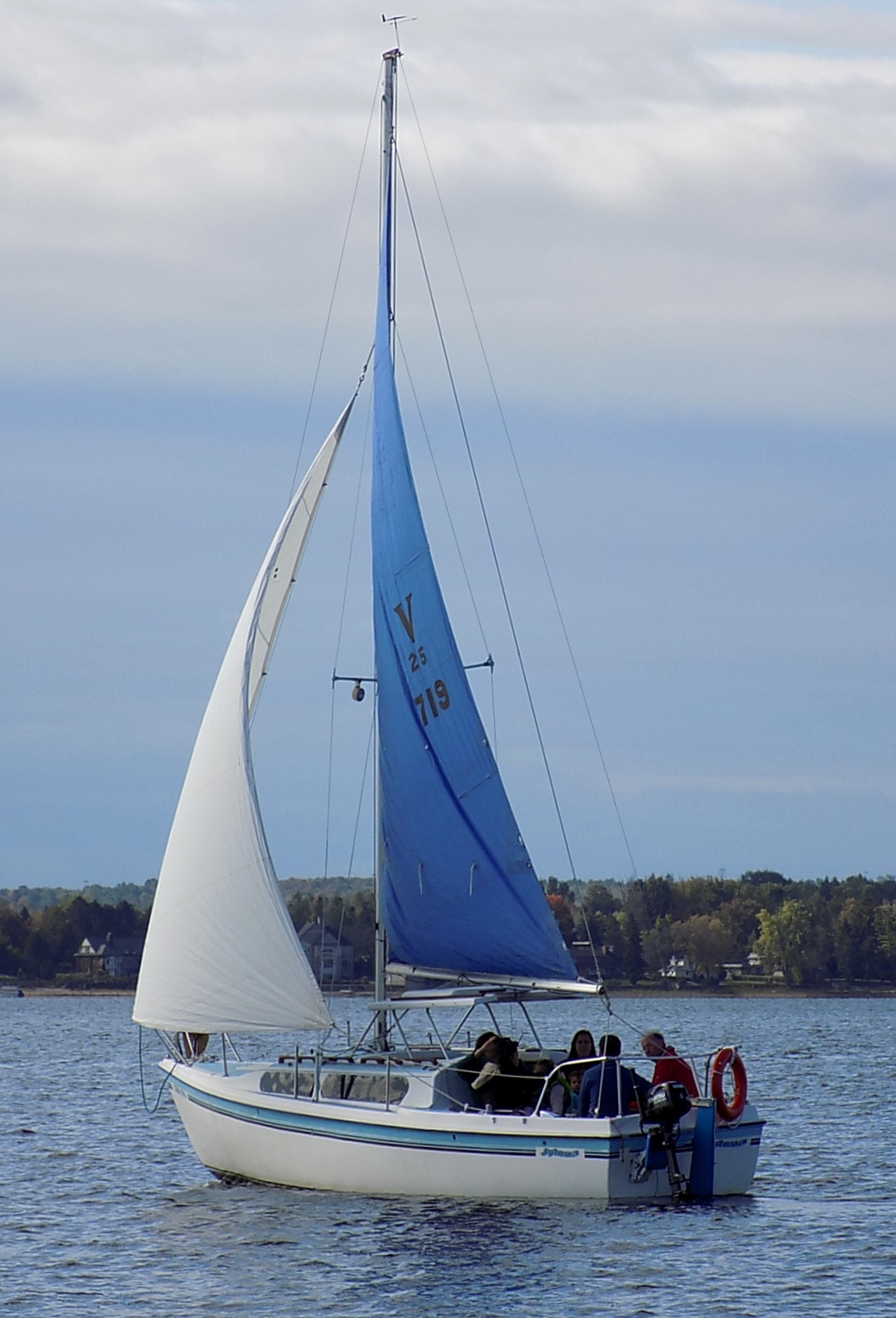
MacGregor 25 with fractional rig

Designed by Roger MacGregor, the MacGregor 25 is a small recreational keelboat, built predominantly of fiberglass, with wood trim. It has a fractional sloop masthead sloop rig, a transom-hung rudder and a fixed stub keel with a centerboard. It displaces 2,100 lb (953 kg) and carries 625 lb (283 kg) of ballast.

Starting in 1980, a number of boats were built with a masthead sloop rig and known as the MacGregor 25 MH.

The boat has a draft of 5.67 ft (1.73 m) with the centreboard extended and 1.50 ft (0.46 m) with it retracted, allowing beaching or ground transportation on a trailer.

The boat is normally fitted with a 3 to 6 hp (2 to 4 kW) outboard motor for docking and maneuvering.

The design has sleeping accommodation for five people, with a double "V"-berth in the bow cabin, a straight settee in the main cabin on the port side and drop-down dinette table on the starboard side that forms a double berth. The galley is located on the port side just forward of the companionway ladder. The galley is equipped with a two-burner stove and a sink. The head is located just aft of the bow cabin on the starboard side. Cabin headroom is 57 in (145 cm).

The masthead rigged version has a PHRF racing average handicap of 231, with a high of 246 and low of 222. All models have a hull speed of 6.43 kn (11.91 km/h).

== Operational history ==
In a 2010 review, Steve Henkel wrote, "This popular design started out as the Venture 25 in 1973, and in 1981 became the MacGregor 25, with no major changes to the design. Over the years there was a choice of two sailplans, either a three quarters fractional rig or a masthead rig ... The boat is lightly built and has ample sail area (note the higher SA/D versus comps) so she will have a good turn of speed if properly equipped and tuned."

=== American Sailboat Hall of Fame ===
The MacGregor 25 was inducted into the now-defunct Sail America American Sailboat Hall of Fame in 2000. In honoring the design, the hall cited, "Henry Ford is often credited with bringing the automobile to the common man. Roger MacGregor, a one-time Ford employee, may well be credited with doing the same thing for the cruising sailboat. The popular MacGregor 25 was the flagship of his line for 14 years. With a swinging keel ... that made transporting and launching the boat a snap, and a price that hovered around the cost of a new car, the MacGregor 25 opened up coastal and inland sailing to thousands."

== See also ==
- List of sailing boat types

Related development

- MacGregor 26
