= Baymaster 18 =

Sailboat class

- B-18

Development
- Designer: Winthrop L. Warner
- Location: United States
- Year: 1968
- Builder: Regatta Plastics Co.
- Role: Cruiser
- Name: Baymaster 18

Boat
- Displacement: 850 lb (386 kg)
- Draft: 4.00 ft (1.22 m)

Hull
- Type: monohull
- Construction: fiberglass
- LOA: 17.92 ft (5.46 m)
- LWL: 15.00 ft (4.57 m)
- Beam: 6.92 ft (2.11 m)
- Engine: outboard motor

Hull appendages
- Keel: keel and centerboard
- Ballast: 150 lb (68 kg)
- Rudder: transom-mounted rudder

Rig
- Rig type: Bermuda rig

Sails
- Sailplan: fractional rigged sloop
- Total sail area: 146.00 sq ft (13.564 m^{2})

The Baymaster 18 is an American trailerable sailboat that was designed by Winthrop L. Warner as a cruiser and first built in 1968.

== Production ==
The design was built by Regatta Plastics Co. in Houston, Texas, United States, but it is now out of production.

== Design ==
The Baymaster 18 is a recreational sailboat, built predominantly of fiberglass, with wood trim. It has a fractional sloop rig, a raked stem, an angled transom, a transom-hung rudder controlled by a tiller and a fixed keel with a centerboard. It displaces 850 lb (386 kg) and carries 150 lb (68 kg) of ballast.

The boat has a draft of 4.00 ft (1.22 m) with the centerboard extended and 9 in (23 cm) with it retracted, allowing beaching or ground transportation on a trailer.

The boat is normally fitted with a small 2 to 5 hp (1 to 4 kW) outboard motor for docking and maneuvering.

The design has sleeping accommodation for four people, with a double berth in the cabin, and two in the cockpit under a boom tent. Cabin headroom is 39 in (99 cm).

The design has a hull speed of 5.2 kn (9.6 km/h).

== Operational history ==
In a 2010 review Steve Henkel wrote, "The designer's intent was to place emphasis on safety and stability. Perhaps not surprisingly considering this, he has kept the main performance parameters (displacement, D/L, SA/D,) in the middle of the comp[etition] group. Best features: The large self-bailing cockpit has room enough to sleep two under a boom-tent, adding space for the other two crew in the cabin, though we think having four crew aboard overnight would be like sleeping four in a closet. That's not necessarily bad: we have met people who like to sleep four in a closet. In any case, she has the look of a classic little sailer and we suspect sails well. though we have never seen one sailing. Worst features: The Baymaster has the lowest headroom among her comp[etitor]s."

== See also ==
- List of sailing boat types
