= MacGregor 19 =

Sailboat class

- M 19

Development
- Designer: Roger MacGregor
- Location: United States
- Year: 1992
- Builder: MacGregor Yacht Corporation
- Role: Cruiser
- Name: MacGregor 19

Boat
- Displacement: 2,050 lb (930 kg)
- Draft: 5.08 ft (1.55 m) with centerboard down

Hull
- Type: monohull
- Construction: fiberglass
- LOA: 18.83 ft (5.74 m)
- LWL: 17.00 ft (5.18 m)
- Beam: 7.42 ft (2.26 m)
- Engine: outboard motor

Hull appendages
- Keel: centerboard
- Ballast: 800 lb (363 kg) of water
- Rudder: dual transom-mounted rudders

Rig
- Rig type: Bermuda rig

Sails
- Sailplan: masthead sloop
- Total sail area: 167.00 sq ft (15.515 m^{2})

The MacGregor 19, also called the PowerSailer 19, is an American trailerable sailboat that was designed by Roger MacGregor as a cruiser and first built in 1992.

== Production ==
The design was built by the MacGregor Yacht Corporation in the United States from 1992 until 1995, but it is now out of production.

== Design ==
The MacGregor 19 is a recreational motorsailer, built predominantly of fiberglass. Early production boats had a fractional sloop rig, while later ones had a masthead sloop rig. The hull has a raked stem, a slightly angled transom, dual transom-hung rudders controlled by a tiller and a retractable centerboard. It displaces 2,050 lb (930 kg) and carries 800 lb (363 kg) of flooding water ballast. The ballast is drained for road transport.

The boat has a draft of 5.08 ft (1.55 m) with the centerboard extended and 9 in (23 cm) with it retracted, allowing operation in shallow water, beaching or ground transportation on a trailer.

The boat is normally fitted with an 8 to 40 hp (6 to 30 kW) outboard motor for cruising, docking and maneuvering. It can cruise at 20 kn (37 km/h) with a 40 hp (30 kW) motor.

The design has sleeping accommodation for four people, with a double "V"-berth in the bow cabin and an aft cabin with a double berth under the cockpit. The galley is located above the bow cabin and is equipped with a two-burner stove and an icebox. The enclosed head is located amidships on the starboard side. Cabin headroom is 48 in (122 cm).

The design has a hull speed of 5.4 kn (10.0 km/h).

== Operational history ==
In a 2010 review Steve Henkel wrote, "not too many sailboats can go 20 knots under power ... In the case of ... the PowerSailer ... the necessary sacrifices of sailing qualities (sailing speed, stability, manueverability, aesthetics) to attain speed under power will be unacceptable to many, if not most, sailors. Best features: Speed under power, of course, is the main selling feature. In addition, very shallow draft is good for exploring beaches. Her self-bailing cockpit is deep and comfortable. A sizable double berth extending all the way across the boat under the cockpit is about as roomy as you'll get on a 19-foot sailboat—but it's not for folks with claustrophobia, Worst features: Steering the PowerSailer 19 under sail can be very frustrating, especially when attempting to make sharp turns. This is partly because the twin rudders are too small for the job. Excessive side-slip when steering under power can also be a problem unless the centerboard is dropped. Water ballast provides inadequate stability in breezy wind conditions."

== See also ==
- List of sailing boat types
