= American Sailboat Hall of Fame =

Defunct hall of fame

The American Sailboat Hall of Fame is a defunct hall of fame honoring 26 production sailboats built-in the United States. The hall of fame was established in 1994 by Sail America, a trade association for the U.S. sailing industry, to recognize ingenuity in designs by American boat builders. The last year of induction was 2004.

Half-hull models of each Hall of Fame inductee was housed in a permanent exhibit at The Museum of Yachting located in Fort Adams State Park in Newport, Rhode Island prior to the museum's dismantling after a 2007 acquisition by the IYRS School of Technology & Trades. The collection also traveled around the country each year to be displayed at the various Strictly Sail boat shows sponsored by Sail America, and at Sail Expo in Atlantic City, New Jersey.

Inducted sailboats were required to be production models built in the U.S. introduced at least 15 years prior to induction, and to have made a lasting impact on sailing. Selections to the hall of fame were made by a committee composed of magazine editors of Sailing Magazine, Sailing World, and SAIL.

== Inductees ==
Inductee	year inducted
Aqua Cat	2001
Bermuda 40	1995
Cal 40	1996
Catalina 22	1995
Catalina 30	2001
Day Sailer	2003
International Optimist Dinghy	1999
Ensign	2002
F-27	2004
Flying Scot	1998
Freedom 40	2000
Hobie 16	1997
J/24	1995
J/35	1999
Laser	1997
MacGregor 25	2000
Morgan Out Island 41	1996
Pacific Seacraft 37	2002
Pearson Triton	1995
Sabre 28	2003
Santa Cruz 27	1997
Sonar (keelboat)	2004
Sunfish	1995
Tartan Ten	1998
Valiant 40	1997
Windsurfer	1996

== See also ==
- National Sailing Hall of Fame
- ISAF World Sailor of the Year Awards
- List of maritime museums in the United States
