= MacGregor 22 =

Sailboat class

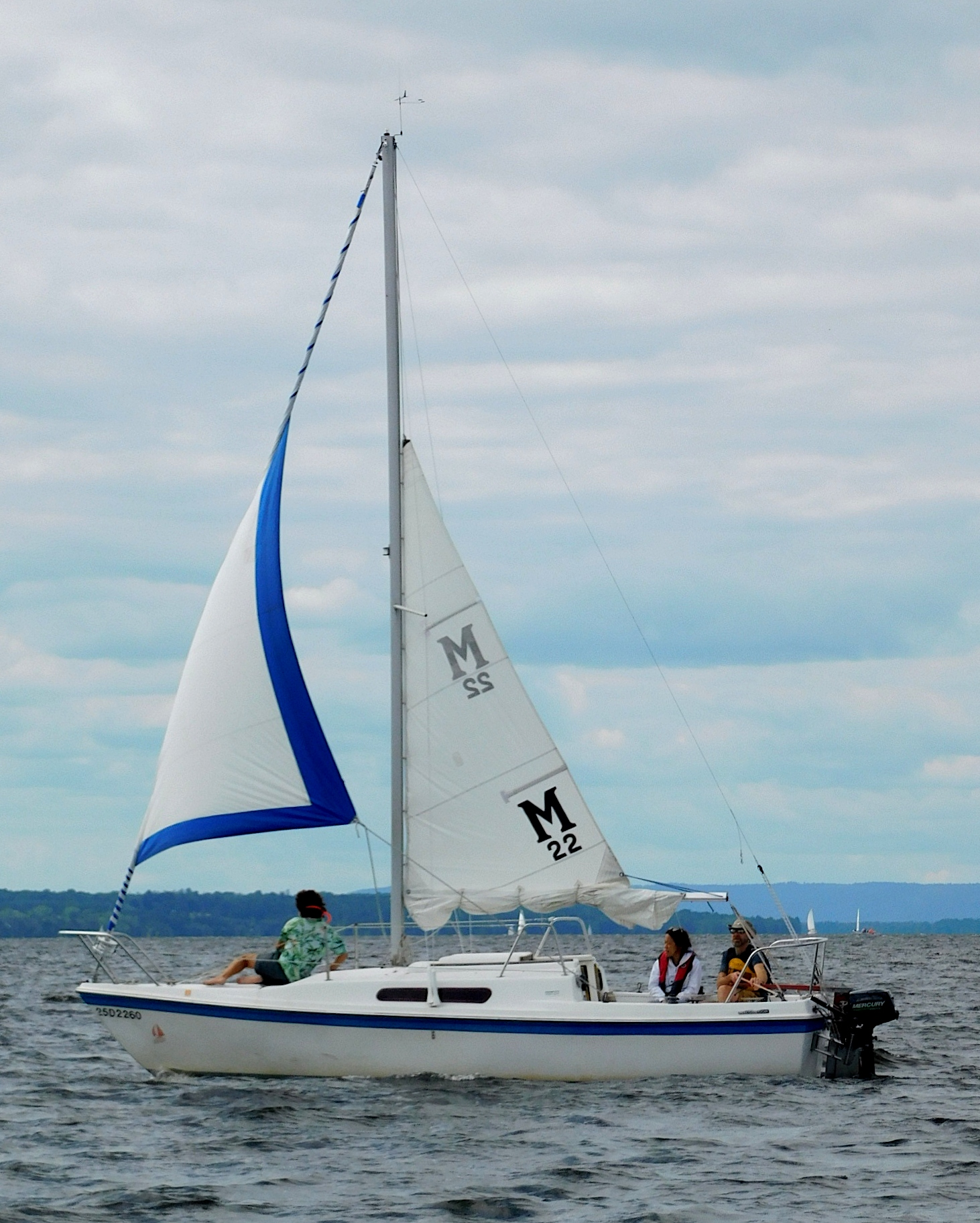
- M 22

Development
- Designer: Roger MacGregor
- Location: United States
- Year: 1967
- Builder: MacGregor Yacht Corporation
- Role: Cruiser

Boat
- Displacement: 1,800 lb (816 kg)
- Draft: 5.50 ft (1.68 m) with keel down

Hull
- Type: monohull
- Construction: fiberglass
- LOA: 22.00 ft (6.71 m)
- LWL: 19.50 ft (5.94 m)
- Beam: 7.33 ft (2.23 m)
- Engine: outboard motor

Hull appendages
- Keel: swing keel
- Ballast: 500 lb (227 kg)
- Rudders: transom-mounted, pivoting rudder

Rig
- Rig type: Bermuda rig
- I foretriangle height: 25.30 ft (7.71 m)
- J foretriangle base: 9.20 ft (2.80 m)
- P mainsail luff: 21.30 ft (6.49 m)
- E mainsail foot: 9.20 ft (2.80 m)

Sails
- Sailplan: masthead sloop
- Mainsail area: 97.98 sq ft (9.103 m^{2})
- Jib/genoa area: 116.38 sq ft (10.812 m^{2})
- Total sail area: 214.36 sq ft (19.915 m^{2})

Racing
- PHRF: 258

The MacGregor 22 is an American trailerable sailboat that was designed by Roger MacGregor as a cruiser and first built in 1967.

The design was developed into the Venture 222 in 1971, with just some minor changes.

== Production ==
The design was built by MacGregor Yacht Corporation in the United States from 1967 until 1975, but it is now out of production.

== Design ==
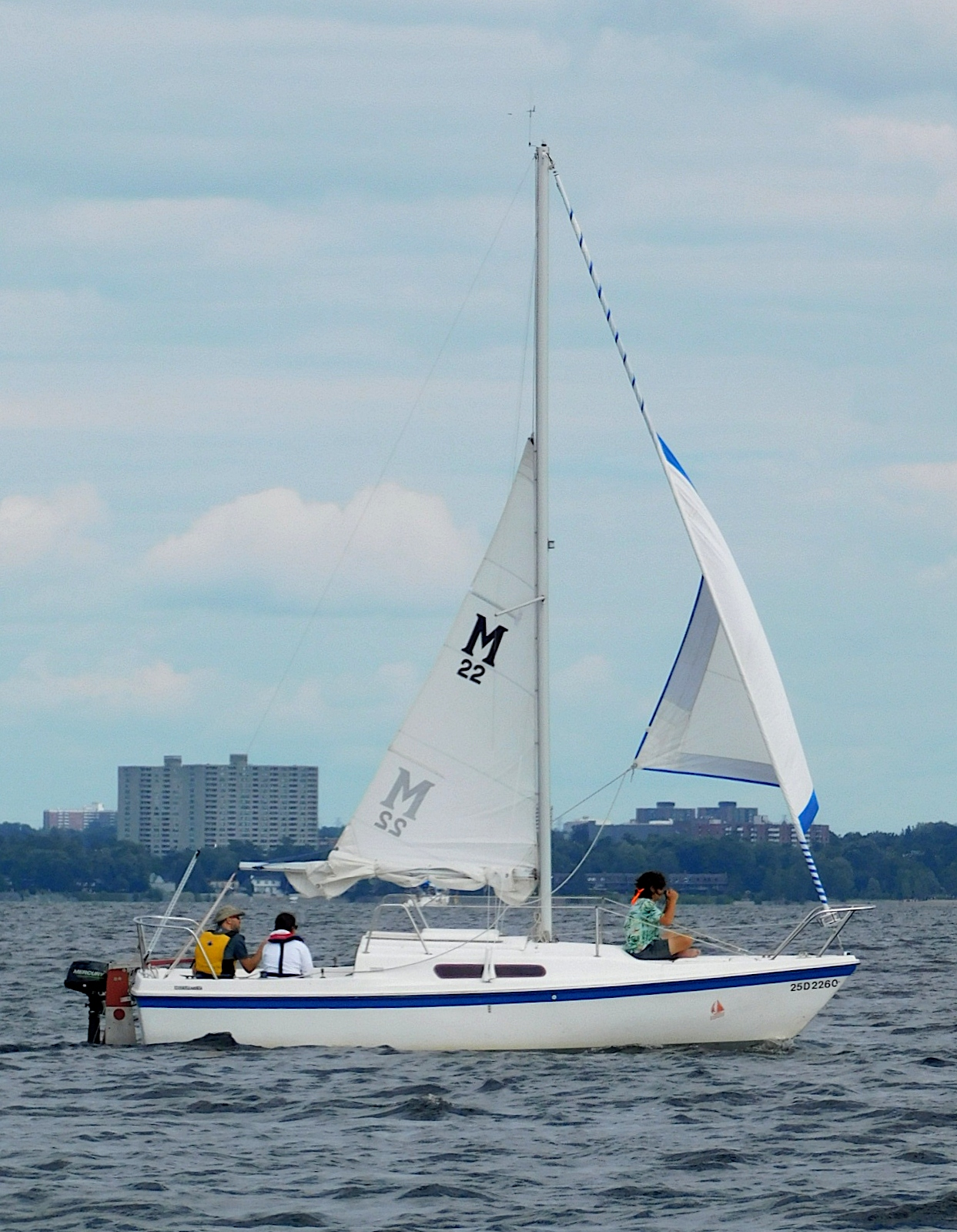
MacGregor 22 with sails reefed for higher winds.

The MacGregor 22 is a recreational keelboat, built predominantly of fiberglass, with wood trim. It has a masthead sloop rig, a raked stem, a nearly plumb transom, a folding transom-hung rudder controlled by a tiller and a lifting keel. It has positive foam flotation for safety. It displaces 1,800 lb (816 kg) and carries 500 lb (227 kg) of ballast.

The boat has a draft of 5.50 ft (1.68 m) with the lifting keel extended and 1.00 ft (0.30 m) with it retracted, allowing operation in shallow water, beaching or ground transportation on a trailer.

The boat is normally fitted with a small 3 to 6 hp (2 to 4 kW) outboard motor for docking and maneuvering.

The design has sleeping accommodation for five people, with a double "V"-berth in the bow cabin, a straight settee and a drop-down dinette table that converts into a double berth in the main cabin. The galley is located on the port side at the companionway ladder. The galley is equipped with a two-burner stove and a sink. The enclosed head is located just aft of the bow cabin on the starboard side. Cabin headroom is 48 in (122 cm) and there is also a main cabin pop-top to increase headroom.

For sailing downwind the design may be equipped with an asymmetrical spinnaker.

The design has a PHRF racing average handicap of 258 and a hull speed of 5.9 kn (10.9 km/h).

== Operational history ==
In a review SailRite wrote, "the MacGregor 22 was designed to provide the best accommodation for the money for a boat its size. The MacGregor 22['s] light displacement gives it great performance in light to moderate wind conditions."

== See also ==
- List of sailing boat types
