= Robert Tucker (boat designer) =

Robert Tucker (died 1998) was a sailor and boat designer from the United Kingdom. His designs covered a wide range of yachts, but he is principally known for smaller models, of which one source names 18 varieties dating from 1954 to 1972. He is notable for having designed one of the first trailer sailers, the Silhouette.

== Boat designs ==
- Matilda 20
- Silhouette (boat)
