= Venture 222 =

1970s American trailer sailer

- V 222

Development
- Designer: Roger MacGregor
- Location: United States
- Year: 1971
- Builder: MacGregor Yacht Corporation
- Role: Cruiser
- Name: Venture 222

Boat
- Displacement: 2,000 lb (907 kg)
- Draft: 4.50 ft (1.37 m) with keel down

Hull
- Type: monohull
- Construction: fiberglass
- LOA: 22.00 ft (6.71 m)
- LWL: 18.17 ft (5.54 m)
- Beam: 7.33 ft (2.23 m)
- Engine: outboard motor

Hull appendages
- Keel: swing keel
- Ballast: 500 lb (227 kg)
- Rudder: transom-mounted rudder

Rig
- Rig type: Bermuda rig
- I foretriangle height: 24.00 ft (7.32 m)
- J foretriangle base: 9.75 ft (2.97 m)
- P mainsail luff: 21.00 ft (6.40 m)
- E mainsail foot: 8.75 ft (2.67 m)

Sails
- Sailplan: masthead sloop
- Mainsail area: 91.88 sq ft (8.536 m^{2})
- Jib/genoa area: 117.00 sq ft (10.870 m^{2})
- Total sail area: 208.88 sq ft (19.406 m^{2})

Racing
- PHRF: 258

The Venture 222 is a recreational keelboat built in the United States, from 1971 until 1982 by MacGregor Yacht Corporation who also built the similar Venture 22 and MacGregor 22.

Designed by Roger MacGregor the fiberglass hull has a raked stem, a slightly angled transom, a transom-hung rudder controlled by a tiller and a retractable swing keel. It has positive foam flotation, making it unsinkable. It has a draft of 4.50 ft (1.37 m) with the keel extended and 12 in (30 cm) with it retracted, allowing operation in shallow water, beaching or ground transportation on a trailer.

It has a "pop-top" to increase cabin headroom and sleeping accommodation for five people, with a double "V"-berth in the bow cabin, drop-down dinette table that forms a small double berth on the starboard side of the main cabin, and an aft quarter berth on the port side. The galley is located on the port side just aft of the bow cabin and is equipped with a two-burner stove and a sink. The head is located in the bow cabin on the starboard side under the "V"-berth. The cabin headroom is 48 in (122 cm) or 73 in (185 cm) with the pop-top open.

It has a masthead sloop rig.

The hull speed is 5.7 kn (10.6 km/h).

In a 2010 review Steve Henkel noted that the boat has "cheap construction".
