= Matilda 20 =

Sailboat class

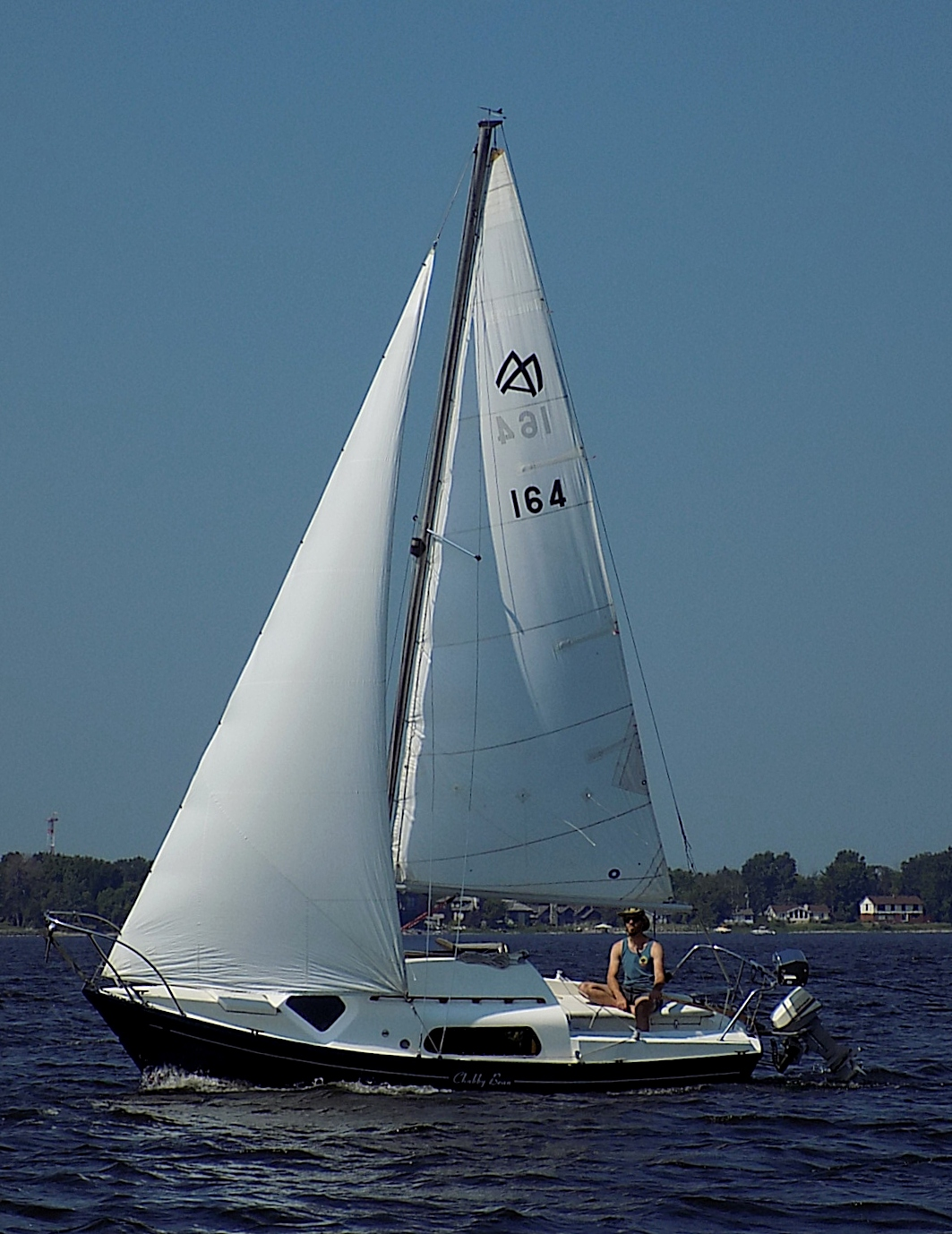

Development
- Designer: Robert Tucker
- Location: Canada
- Year: 1971
- Builder: Ouyang Boat Works
- Role: Day sailer-cruiser
- Name: Matilda 20

Boat
- Displacement: 1,550 lb (703 kg)
- Draft: 4.16 ft (1.27 m) with keel down

Hull
- Type: monohull
- Construction: fibreglass
- LOA: 19.50 ft (5.94 m)
- LWL: 16.33 ft (4.98 m)
- Beam: 7.92 ft (2.41 m)
- Engine: outboard motor

Hull appendages
- Keel: lifting keel
- Ballast: 300 lb (136 kg)
- Rudder: transom-mounted rudder

Rig
- Rig type: Bermuda rig
- I foretriangle height: 23.50 ft (7.16 m)
- J foretriangle base: 8.00 ft (2.44 m)
- P mainsail luff: 20.80 ft (6.34 m)
- E mainsail foot: 8.00 ft (2.44 m)

Sails
- Sailplan: masthead sloop
- Mainsail area: 83.20 sq ft (7.730 m^{2})
- Jib/genoa area: 94.00 sq ft (8.733 m^{2})
- Total sail area: 177.20 sq ft (16.462 m^{2})

Racing
- PHRF: 276

The Matilda 20 is a sailboat that was designed by Robert Tucker as a daysailer and a cruiser and first built in 1971.

== Production ==
The design was built by Ouyang Boat Works in Canada, between 1971 and about 1979, but it is now out of production.

Other versions of the boat were built from plywood with a hard-chined hull and a fractional rigged sloop configuration were built by other companies in Australia, the United Kingdom and South Africa.

== Design ==
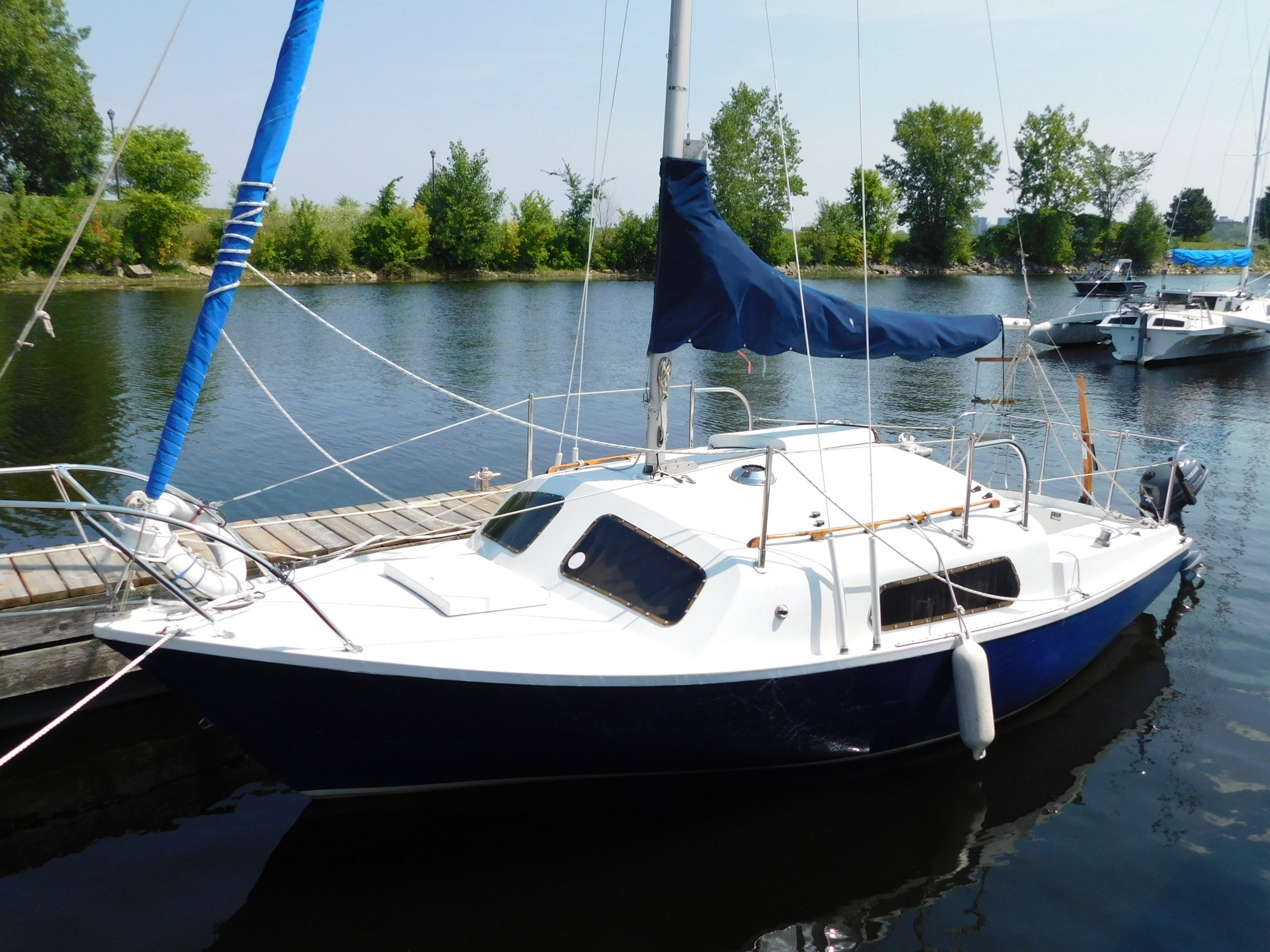
Matilda 20 showing the distinctive front coach house ports

The Matilda 20 built by Ouyang Boat Works is a recreational keelboat, with a round-bilge hull constructed predominantly of fibreglass, with wooden trim. It has a masthead sloop rig, a raked stem, an angled transom, a transom-hung rudder controlled by a tiller and a lifting keel with a weighted bulb. The boat displaces 1,550 lb (703 kg) and carries 300 lb (136 kg) of ballast.

The boat has a draft of 4.16 ft (1.27 m) with the lifting keel extended and 9 in (23 cm) with it retracted, allowing operation in shallow water, beaching or ground transportation on a trailer.

The boat is normally fitted with a small 3 to 6 hp (2 to 4 kW) outboard motor for docking and manoeuvring.

The design has sleeping accommodation for four people, with a double "V"-berth in the bow cabin and two quarter berths aft, under the cockpit sides. The galley is located on the starboard side just aft of the bow cabin. The galley is L-shaped and is equipped with a two-burner stove, icebox and a sink. The head is located just aft of the bow cabin on the port side. Access to the bow cabin is through the head. Cabin headroom is 50 in (127 cm). Unusually in sailboat design, the coach house has two front portlights.

The design has a PHRF racing average handicap of 276 and a hull speed of 5.4 kn (10.0 km/h).

== Operational history ==
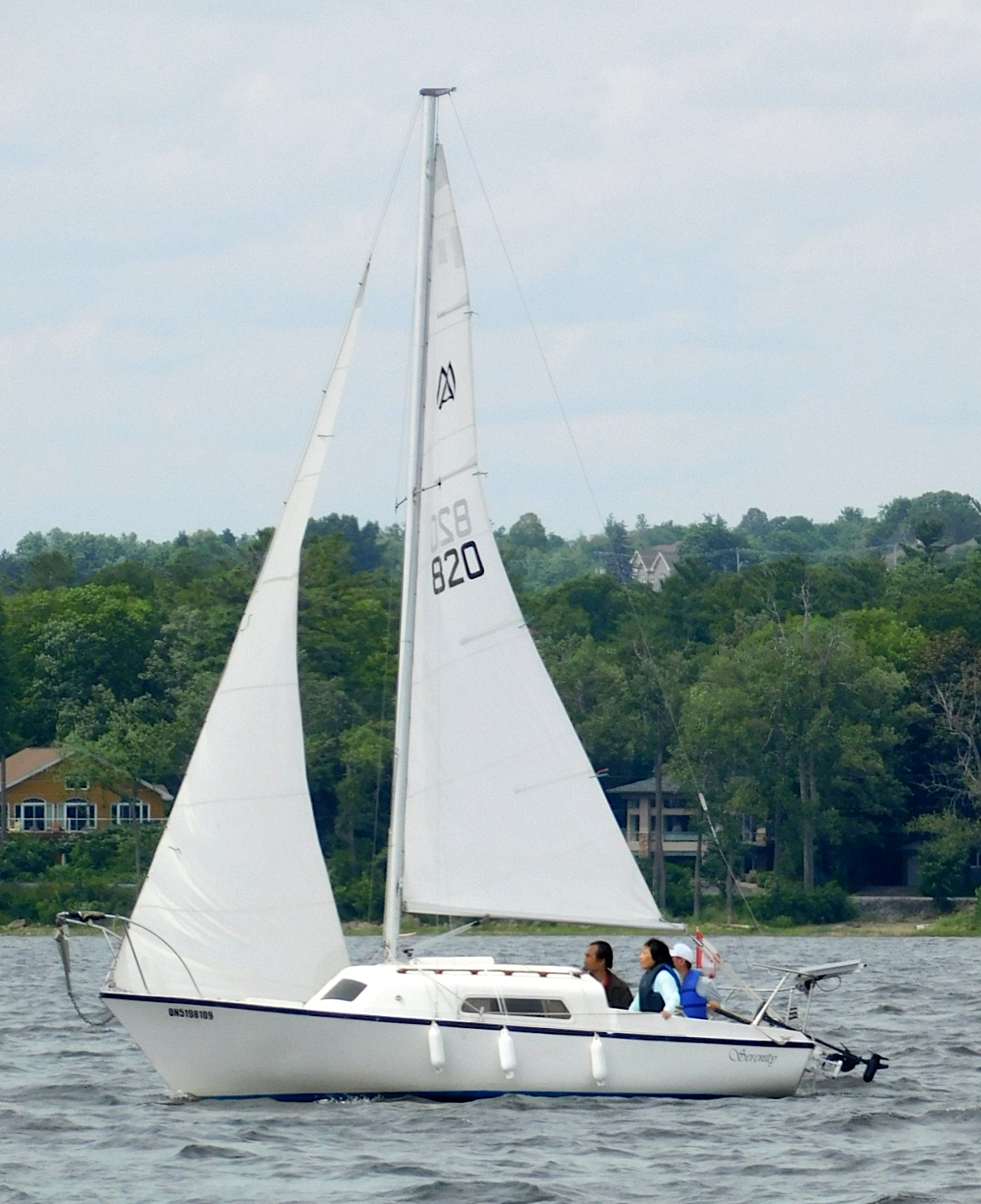
Matilda 20

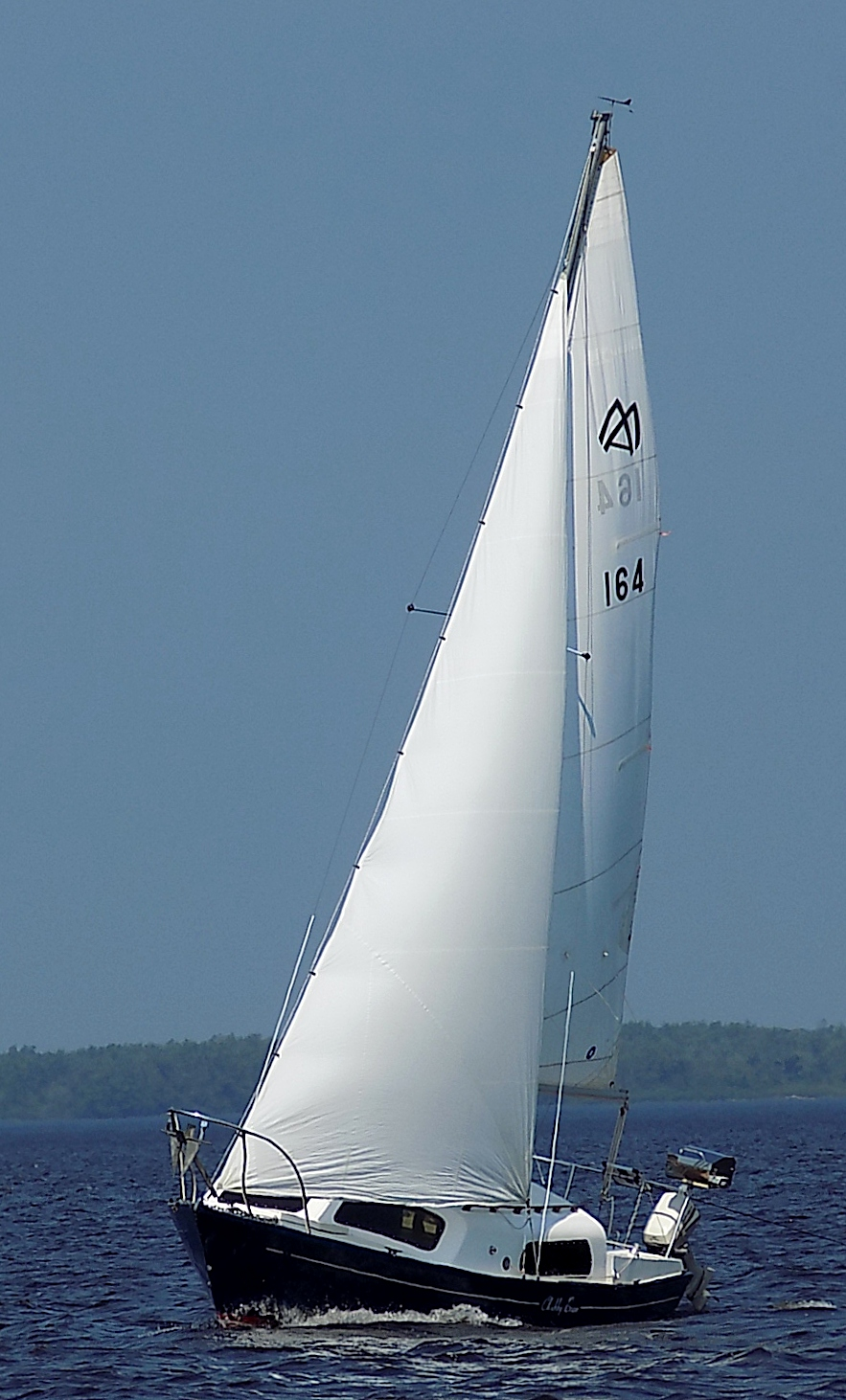
Matilda 20

In a 2010 review Steve Henkel wrote, "the design features a relatively wide beam for her length ... that, combined with her full-width cabin house (no side decks), makes her relatively roomy, but also results in a somewhat awkward appearance—and ironically, compared to her higher-topside comps, the Matilda ends up with a lower Space Index. Best features: The lifting keel has a bulb at the bottom, helping (along with a high D/L) to give good stability under sail, as well as a motion index higher than her comps. The keel height is controlled by a cockpit mounted winch. Unlike some lifting-keel designs, the Matilda 20 can be sailed with the keel in any position as the occasion demands. Worst features: Access to the forward V-berth is through the curtain-enclosed head area, a minor inconvenience."

In a review Michael McGoldrick wrote, "the Matilda 20 has a very wide beam for a 20 footer. It also has to rate as one of the roomier 20 footers on the used market in Canada. Much of the Matilda's large interior is due to the fact that its cabin stretches the full width of the beam (there are no side decks). This feature gives the boat a somewhat awkward appearance, but is also means that it has an interesting cabin layout below decks and space for a semi-private head (toilet). A noteworthy feature is that the Matilda has a good size ballasted centerboard as retractable keel ... For the amount of room it offers, the Matilda is a relatively light boat. This boat usually comes on a trailer."
