= Venture of Newport 23 =

American recreational keelboat

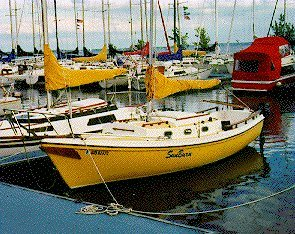
- V

Development
- Designer: Roger MacGregor
- Location: United States
- Year: 1973
- Builder: MacGregor Yacht Corporation
- Role: Cruiser
- Name: Venture of Newport 23

Boat
- Displacement: 2,000 lb (907 kg)
- Draft: 5.50 ft (1.68 m) with keel down

Hull
- Type: monohull
- Construction: fiberglass
- LOA: 22.58 ft (6.88 m)
- LWL: 19.50 ft (5.94 m)
- Beam: 7.17 ft (2.19 m)
- Engine: outboard motor

Hull appendages
- Keel: swing keel
- Ballast: 600 lb (272 kg)
- Rudder: transom-mounted rudder

Rig
- Rig type: Cutter rig
- I foretriangle height: 22.75 ft (6.93 m)
- J foretriangle base: 12.42 ft (3.79 m)
- P mainsail luff: 25.50 ft (7.77 m)
- E mainsail foot: 9.00 ft (2.74 m)

Sails
- Sailplan: Cutter rigged sloop
- Mainsail area: 114.75 sq ft (10.661 m^{2})
- Jib/genoa area: 141.75 sq ft (13.169 m^{2})
- Total sail area: 256.03 sq ft (23.786 m^{2})

Racing
- PHRF: 255

The Venture of Newport 23 is a recreational keelboat intended as a replica of a pilot cutter of the late 1800s. It was built by MacGregor Yacht Corporation in the United States, from 1973 until 1984. It is also known as the Venture 23, and the MacGregor 23.

Designed by Roger MacGregor, the fiberglass hull with a spooned raked stem with a bowsprit, an angled transom, a transom-hung rudder controlled by a tiller and a retractable swing keel. The boat has a draft of 5.50 ft (1.68 m) with the keel extended and 1.50 ft (0.46 m) with it retracted. The design has a hull speed of 5.9 kn (10.9 km/h).

It is a cutter rigged sloop with a raked mast.

The design has sleeping accommodation for five people, with a double "V"-berth in the bow cabin, a straight settee to port and a drop down dinette table to starboard that converts to a double berth in the main cabin. The galley is located on the port side just forward of the companionway ladder. The galley is equipped with a two-burner stove and a sink. The enclosed head is located just aft of the bow cabin on the starboard side. Cabin headroom is 48 in (122 cm).
