= RL 24 =

Type of sailboat

Development
- Location: Victoria, Australia
- Year: 1972-1988
- Design: One-Design
- Role: Racing, cruising

Boat
- Draft: 0.36 metres (1 ft 2 in)-1.2 metres (3 ft 11 in)

Hull
- Type: Monohull
- Hull weight: 660 kilograms (1,460 lb)
- LOA: 7.3 metres (23 ft 11 in)
- LWL: 5.9 metres (19 ft 4 in)
- Beam: 2.2 metres (7 ft 3 in)

Hull appendages
- Keel: Centerboard

Rig
- Rig type: Bermuda

Sails
- Spinnaker area: 20 square metres (220 ft^{2})
- Upwind sail area: 20 square metres (220 ft^{2})

The RL 24 is a popular, 24 ft long Australian trailer sailer. The RL 24 was designed by Rob Legg. 628 boats were built in Australia, mostly by Rob Legg Yachts Pty Ltd from 1972 to 1988, with 12 being built in Western Australia. An additional 500 boats were also built under licence in Minnesota.

The RL 24 was designed to offer good performance with ease of launching and rigging for a sailing family. It sleeps 4 and has an internal toilet. The design also featured a motor well on the stern.

The RL 24 was built in four versions.

- MkI with 100 produced
- MkII built from 1976 with upgraded hull finish and heavier centre board.
- MkIII built from 1980 with increased cabin height and interior alterations.
- MkIV an improved racing version.

As at 2019, there was an active RL 24 Association with annual national titles held in various locations around Australia. 2019 saw the 46th National Rob Legg Titles held at the Royal Queensland Yacht Squadron. Rob Legg attended the event, celebrating his 90th birthday and died the following month.

== See also ==
- List of sailing boat types
