= MacGregor Yacht Corporation =

Defunct boat manufacturer

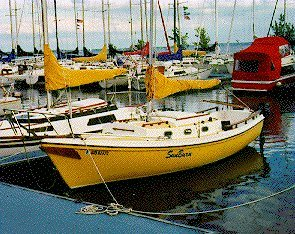
Venture of Newport 23

The MacGregor Yacht Corporation was a manufacturer of sailing yachts, located in Costa Mesa, California.

== History ==
MacGregor Yacht Co. was founded by Roger MacGregor as part of a Stanford University MBA class project in the early 1960s. The company was in business until early 2013, having been succeeded by Tattoo Yachts. MacGregor produced primarily small, trailerable sailing yachts, from a 15-foot (4.6 m) catamaran to 17-foot (5.2 m) pocket cruisers, up to 26-foot (7.9 m) water ballasted trailerable sizes. MacGregor has also built a 36-foot (11 m) catamaran, and a 65-foot (20 m) yacht. The final model produced was the MacGregor 26M, a 26-foot (7.9 m) trailerable sailboat, which is now under production as the Tattoo 26. The 26M had the ability to mount up to a 60 horsepower (45 kW) outboard motor.

At least two large one-off yachts were built (c) 1987 - one for Mr. MacGregor's daughter (now the owner of Tattoo yachts) and a second for a private party in Connecticut, USA. Enigma (MACS0024L687), 72 LOA 12.5 beam 9.5 draft was donated by first owner to the University of Texas (years of use???) then sold at auction to a private party in Florida, USA.

MacGregor was known for using innovative features to provide stability while maintaining light weight and easy trailerability. The swing keel was one of the innovations used on MacGregor's smaller boats, and water ballast was another. The model 26M weighs only 2,550 lb (1,160 kg) dry, 300 lb (140 kg) of which is permanent ballast. When in the water it can take on an additional 1,150 lb (520 kg) of water ballast, stored in tanks below the waterline. This allows the 26M to be self-righting; if rolled 90 degrees, the weight of the ballast will quickly flip the boat back upright.

MacGregor manufactured over 36,000 yachts during its lifetime. While most of these were the smaller pocket cruisers and larger trailerable models, it also made about 100 of the M-65 model during its 8 year production run, making it the most successful luxury yacht ever made.

Roger MacGregor retired in 2013, closing the Costa Mesa factory and ending production. Simultaneously, his daughter Laura MacGregor Sharp incorporated Tattoo Yachts in Stuart, Florida. Tattoo yachts purchased the tooling for the MacGregor 26M, and began producing the Tattoo 26, which is the same boat with minor modifications. Tattoo inherited the dealer network and parts supply chain from MacGregor, and has successfully entered full production, completing a transition and factory move with a six month interruption to boat availability to dealers. Tattoo is currently designing an entirely new 22 foot design as well.

== Models ==
MacGregor has produced models under two brand names, Venture, used until 1977, and MacGregor. These are usually abbreviated to M- and V- in model names, with a number following indicating the approximate hull length in feet. Many models, whose production spanned the 1979 brand name change, were sold under both names. The Venture models were all day sailers and pocket cruisers, while the MacGregors started with the larger pocket cruisers and went up to large luxury yachts. The first model MacGregor made was the V-21, a pocket cruiser with a swing keel.

The M-19 and some M-26 models are listed as powersailers, because they have provisions for mounting more powerful engines, and are capable of sustained high-speed planing like a motorboat. For example, the M-19 can mount a 40 horsepower (30 kW) outboard, the M-26-X can mount a 50 horsepower (37 kW) outboard and the M-26-M can mount a 60 horsepower (45 kW) outboard. With these large engines, the boats are capable of speeds of over 20 knots (37 km/h), and the M-26-M brochure shows a picture of the boat pulling a waterskier.

Model designation	LOA (feet)	LOA (meters)	Portsmouth DPN (2005)	Type
V-15	15	4.5	90.6	Catamaran
V-17	17	5.1	112.8	Cabin sloop
M-19	19	5.7	N/A	Cabin sloop/powersailer
V-21	21	6.3	102.1(F) 99.7(MH)	Cabin sloop
V-21 Mk II	21	6.3	101.2	Cabin sloop
M-21	21	6.3	100.0	Cabin sloop
M-22	22	6.6	98.6	Cabin sloop
V-222	22	6.6	102.7	Cabin sloop
V-23 Newport	23	6.9	105.8	Cabin cutter
M-23 Newport	23	6.9	N/A	Cabin cutter
V-2-24	24	7.2	97.9	Cabin sloop
V-25	25	7.5	99.1(F) 95.5(MH)	Cabin sloop
M-25	25	7.5	96.0	Cabin sloop
M-26-D	26	7.8	92.6	Cabin sloop, "D" indicating use of a daggerboard
M-26-C	26	7.8	92.6	Cabin sloop, uses a swing keel
M-26-S	26	7.8	94.0	Cabin sloop, "S" indicating use of a swing keel
M-26-X	26	7.8	99.4	Cabin sloop/powersailer, employed a swing keel
M-26-M	26	7.8	96.0	Cabin sloop/powersailer, employs a daggerboard
M-36	36	10.8	69.1	Cabin catamaran
M-65	65	19.5	N/A	Luxury sailing yacht

- F indicates fractional rig, MH indicates masthead rig

The M-25 was inducted into the American Sailboat Hall of Fame in 2000. The M-25 was in production from 1973 to 1987, with over 7000 manufactured.

The final M-26-M model was a daggerboard design, a departure from the swing keel/centerboard used in most previous models. The retracting centerboard frees up floor space in the cabin, and the centerboard trunk is used as the galley wall to save space.

While the M-26-M remained a water ballasted design, it also incorporates 300 pounds of fixed ballast which improves stability when the water ballast tanks are empty. At 2550 pounds empty (1160 kg), it can be towed by most light trucks, SUVs, and minivans equipped with towing packages. The MSRP for the base model M-26-M, with aluminum trailer (new for 2007, replacing the previous steel trailers), was US$22,500.

Tattoo yachts does not list MSRP for the successor Tattoo 26, preferring to allow dealers to set their own pricing as is normal in the sailboat industry.

== See also ==
- List of sailboat designers and manufacturers
