= Boomerang 20 =

Australian trailer sailer

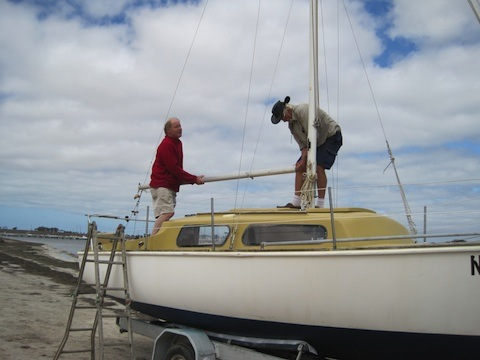
Preparing a Boomerang 20 for launch at Limeburner's Bay, Geelong

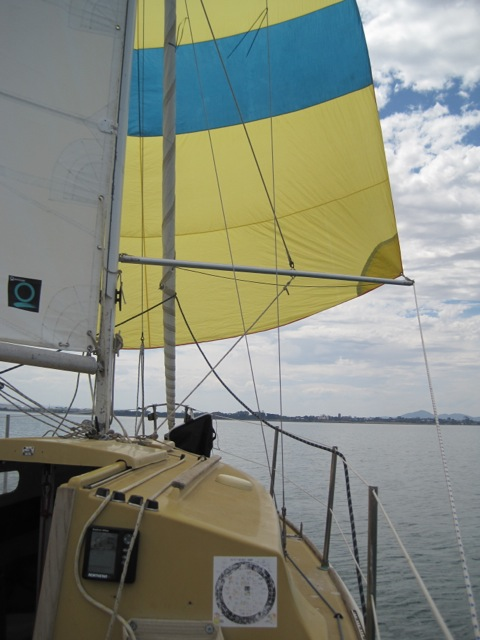
Quiet day on Port Phillip Bay in a Boomerang 20, off Limeburners' Bay, Geelong, Victoria

The Boomerang 20 is a sailboat that was designed by Eric Maizey in the late 1960s to race and cruise on Port Phillip in Melbourne Australia, sheltered water but choppy conditions. The original boats were built at the family home in Frankston with the assistance of the kids and neighbours in cold moulded ply. As interest grew and production increased, the majority were fibreglass construction. The hulls were built by contractors such as Bruce Orchard and fitted out at the Maizey home until the growing business took up residence in a factory in Kookaburra St. Frankston. Boomerangs began appearing at major regattas in increasing numbers, and their reputation for excellent sailing qualities and bulletproof design grew with their successful racing results. The class soon gained JOG qualification and so could race in the relevant offshore events. After Eric Maizey's untimely death, the business was sold and the Boomerang was built in Victoria, Australia, by Maison (Maizey and Son) Marine in the 1970s and later by Peninsula Yachts. The class association continued to grow. Many hundreds have been built over a 25-year period, and there are quite a few still around the waterways. The Boomerang 20 has always been a classic. It is one of the all-time best-sellers of the 20-foot trailer sailers,

== Specifications ==
| LOA Length | 19 ft 9 in ( 6.29 m) |
| Waterline length | 18 ft 10 in ( 5.73 m) |
| Beam Width | 6.9 ft in ( 2.2 m) |
| Draft Board down | 3 ft 8 in ( 1.11 m) drop keel |
| Draft Board up | 1 ft 0 in ( 0.3 m) |
| Displacement | 2070 lb ( 940 kg) |
| Ballast | 530 lb ( 241 kg) - swing keel | | 500 lb ( 227 kg) - retractable keel |
| Tow Mass | 1530 lb ( 695 kg) + trailer + gear |
| Rigging | Masthead sloop |
| Mast | ft in ( m) | single, backswept spreader |
| Sails | Main | 84 ft^{2} ( 7.8 m^{2}) |
| Sails | Working Jib (100%) | 99 ft^{2} ( 9.2 m^{2}) |
| Sails | Genoa | 140 ft^{2} ( 13 m^{2}) |
| Sails | Storm Jib | 40 ft^{2} ( 3.7 m^{2}) |
| Sails | Total sail area | Main & Jib 183 ft^{2} ( 17 m^{2}), Main & Genoa 224 ft^{2} ( 20.81 m^{2}) |
| Spinnaker | 265 ft^{2} ( 24.61 m^{2}) |

I = 7.31 m

J = 2.517 m

P = 6.325 m

E = 2.362 m

== Sailing details ==
Handicaps; PHRF =, Portsmouth =, IRC =, Class based Handicaps CBH (AUST.) = 0.640 drop keel, 0.620 swing keel, Other =

Sailing characteristics

Notable performances

== Accommodation ==
Number of crew to race =4, Berths =4, Galley =, Head =, Navigation =, Maximum headroom =,

== Special features ==
Vertical lift or swing centreboards available.

== Construction ==
Country of origin
Australia (Melbourne)
Hull material
Moulded fibreglass
Manufacturer
Peninsular yachts
Plans availability
No
