= Silhouette (boat) =

British keelboat first built in 1954

Silhouette Mk I

Development
- Designer: Robert Tucker
- Location: United Kingdom
- Year: 1954
- No. built: 3,000
- Builders: Hurley Marine; Varne Marine
- Role: Cruiser
- Name: Silhouette Mk I

Boat
- Draft: 2.00 ft (0.61 m)

Hull
- Type: monohull
- Construction: plywood or glassfibre
- LOA: 17.25 ft (5.26 m)
- LWL: 14.00 ft (4.27 m)
- Beam: 6.75 ft (2.06 m)
- Engine: outboard motor

Hull appendages
- Keel: twin keels
- Rudder: internally-mounted spade-type

Rig
- Rig type: Bermuda rig

Sails
- Sailplan: fractional rigged sloop
- Total sail area: 99.00 sq ft (9.197 m^{2})

The Silhouette also called the Silhouette 17, is a recreational keelboat that was designed by Robert Tucker and first built in 1954.

The basic Silhouette 17 design was developed through five marks and produced for more than 30 years.

== Production ==
Originally made available as a kit for amateur construction from plywood, later kits and finished boats were supplied by Hurley Marine in Plymouth, United Kingdom and later by Varne Marine, among other builders. Production ran between 1954 and 1986, with about 3,000 boats of all marks completed.

After drawings were published in The Rudder magazine in April 1955, some readers noted the boat's outline shape or silhouette and the boat got its name.

== Design ==
The Silhouette 17 is a recreational keelboat, with the early models built predominantly of plywood and later ones from glassfibre, with wood trim. Boats built up until 1960 had a fractional sloop and after that, during Mk II production, switched to a masthead sloop rig. The hull has a spooned, raked stem; a raised counter, angled transom; an internally mounted spade-type rudder controlled by a tiller and twin keels or a single fixed fin keel. All versions had complex sheer lines, producing a distinctive appearance. The displacement and ballast vary by model.

The boat is normally fitted with a small 3 to 5 hp (2 to 4 kW) outboard motor for docking and manoeuvring, although a few models were offered with inboard engines.

The design has sleeping accommodation for two, or four people starting with the Mk IV. Cabin headroom is 44 in (112 cm).

The design has a hull speed of 5.0 kn (9.3 km/h).

== Variants ==
Silhouette 17 Mark I
This kit-boat model was introduced in 1954 in plywood initially and built until 1986 with a choice of a fractional Gunter rig with a sail area of 115.00 sq ft (10.684 m^{2}) or a fractional Bermuda rig with 99.00 sq ft (9.197 m^{2}) of sail. It has a length overall of 17.25 ft (5.3 m) and a waterline length of 14.00 ft (4.3 m). The boat has a draft of 2.00 ft (0.61 m) with the standard twin keels.
Silhouette 17 Mark II
This model was introduced in 1958 and built from plywood until 1963, when glassfibre construction was introduced. On 1960 the previously-employed fractional rig was changed to a masthead rig. Production ran until 1966 with 1,830 boats completed. It has a hard chine hull, with a length overall of 17.25 ft (5.3 m), a waterline length of 14.00 ft (4.3 m), displaces 1,100 lb (499 kg) and carries 300 lb (136 kg) of cast iron ballast. The boat has a draft of 1.67 ft (0.51 m) with the standard twin keels and 2.67 ft (0.81 m) with the optional single fin keel.
Silhouette 17 Mark III
This model was introduced in 1967 and was a major redesign for glassfibre construction by Hurley Marine, including a rounded hull design, a 40% increase in sail area and an optional inboard engine. It has a length overall of 17.25 ft (5.3 m), a waterline length of 14.00 ft (4.3 m), displaces 1,288 lb (584 kg) and carries 450 lb (204 kg) of cast iron ballast. The boat has a draft of 2.08 ft (0.63 m) with the standard twin glassfibre keels and 2.67 ft (0.81 m) with the optional single fin keel.
Silhouette 17 Mark IV
This model was based on the Mk III, introduced in 1974 and built until 1974, with only about 25 completed. It introduced a four berth layout.
Silhouette 17 Mark V
This model was introduced in 1974 and built by Varne Marine after Hurley went out of business and the moulds were sold.

== Reception ==
The boat is supported by an active class club, the Silhouette Owners International Association.

In a 2010 review Steve Henkel wrote, "best features: She probably would be among the least expensive sailboats to buy on the used market, if you could find one in reasonable condition. Worst features: Her shallow keel relatively high wetted surface keep her from being fast or weatherly ... She has the shortest waterline (slow under power), the smallest cockpit, least space below among her comp[etitor]s. Her old-fashioned hard-chine, tortured hull shape, originally dictated by the fact that she was to be built of flat sheets of plywood, give her a strange look that some would call ugly."
