= Hartley TS16 =

Australian one design trailer sailer

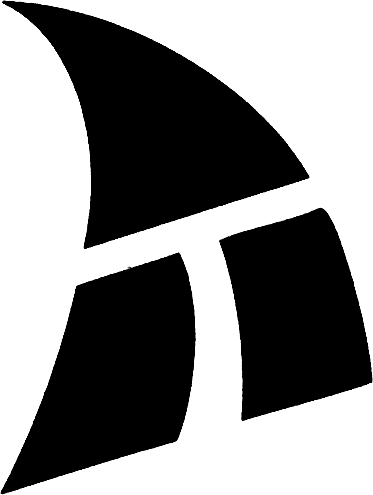

Development
- Designer: Richard Hartley
- Location: Australia
- Year: 1956
- No. built: 1,800
- Builder: Hartley Boat Plans
- Role: Day sailer-One-design racer
- Name: Hartley TS16

Boat
- Displacement: 794 lb (360 kg)
- Draft: 4.07 ft (1.24 m)

Hull
- Type: Monohull
- Construction: Wood or fibreglass
- LOA: 16.40 ft (5.00 m)
- LWL: 14.00 ft (4.27 m)
- Beam: 7.22 ft (2.20 m)

Hull appendages
- Keel: Centreboard
- Rudder: transom-mounted rudder

Rig
- Rig type: Bermuda rig
- I foretriangle height: 16.00 ft (4.88 m)
- J foretriangle base: 5.50 ft (1.68 m)
- P mainsail luff: 19.00 ft (5.79 m)
- E mainsail foot: 11.00 ft (3.35 m)

Sails
- Sailplan: Fractional rigged sloop Masthead sloop
- Mainsail area: 104.50 sq ft (9.708 m^{2})
- Jib/genoa area: 44.00 sq ft (4.088 m^{2})
- Total sail area: 148.50 sq ft (13.796 m^{2})

The Hartley TS16 (Trailer Sailer 16 foot) is an Australian trailer sailer designed in 1956 by New Zealander Richard Hartley as a day sailer and which later became a one design racer.

The design was based on a traditional New Zealand mullet fishing boat and was the first trailer sailer sailboat design built. Hartley later designed the TS18 and TS21.

== Production ==
Most boats completed have been built by amateur builders using hand tools in residential garages and constructed of wood. Construction time is estimated at 400 hours. Later, some were commercially manufactured of fibreglass over a foam core. The boat was designed to fit into a garage. Construction plans are supplied by Hartley Boat Plans of Australia. About 1,800 boats have been completed.

== Design ==
The Hartley TS16 is a centreboard or bilge keel yacht, built of wood, or of fibreglass over a foam core. It has a fractional sloop rig, with wooden or aluminum spars. The hull has a slightly raked stem. The rudder is hung on the near-vertical transom, and controlled by a tiller and a. It displaces 794 lb (360 kg).

The boat has a draft of 4.07 ft (1.24 m) with the centreboard extended and 9 in (23 cm) with it retracted.

A 2001 review in Australian Sailing described the design: "the boat that started the trailer-sailer movement, the Hartley 16 designed by New Zealander Richard Hartley in the early 1950s, still has good support and a very active class association in Australia. Hartley designed the boat for ease of construction in plywood with only hand tools by the home handyman. Although boats have been built professionally in fibreglass foam/sandwich, the most common way of getting on the water in a new boat is to build it in timber from the official plans..."
