= Careel 18 =

Type of sailboat

Development
- Designer: John Duncanson, David Rose
- Year: 1968
- No. built: 400
- Design: One-Design
- Role: Racing, cruising

Boat
- Crew: 1+
- Displacement: 780 kilograms (1,720 lb)
- Draft: 0.3 metres (1 ft 0 in)-1.2 metres (3 ft 11 in)

Hull
- Type: Monohull
- Construction: Fibreglass
- LOA: 5.6 metres (18 ft 4 in)
- Beam: 2.26 metres (7 ft 5 in)

Hull appendages
- Keel: Swing keel
- Ballast: 186 kilograms (410 lb)

Rig
- Rig type: Fractional sloop

Sails
- Total sail area: 14.96 square metres (161.0 sq ft)

The Compass Careel 18 is an 18 ft long trailer sailer manufactured in Australia by David Rose Yachts.

The Careel 18 was originally built in 1968 by John Duncanson as a Duncanson 18, with David Rose taking over manufacturing and renaming the boats the Careel 18. It came out at a time when there was a boom in trailer sailers, but unlike many of its contemporaries, it remains popular today.

The boat was produced in three versions; Mk I (900 kg), Mk II (1100 kg) and Mk III (1200 kg) with successive design changes including additional ballast and increases to deck and cabin height.
