= MacGregor 26 =

Family of water-balasted sail and hybrid boats

MacGregor 26 X
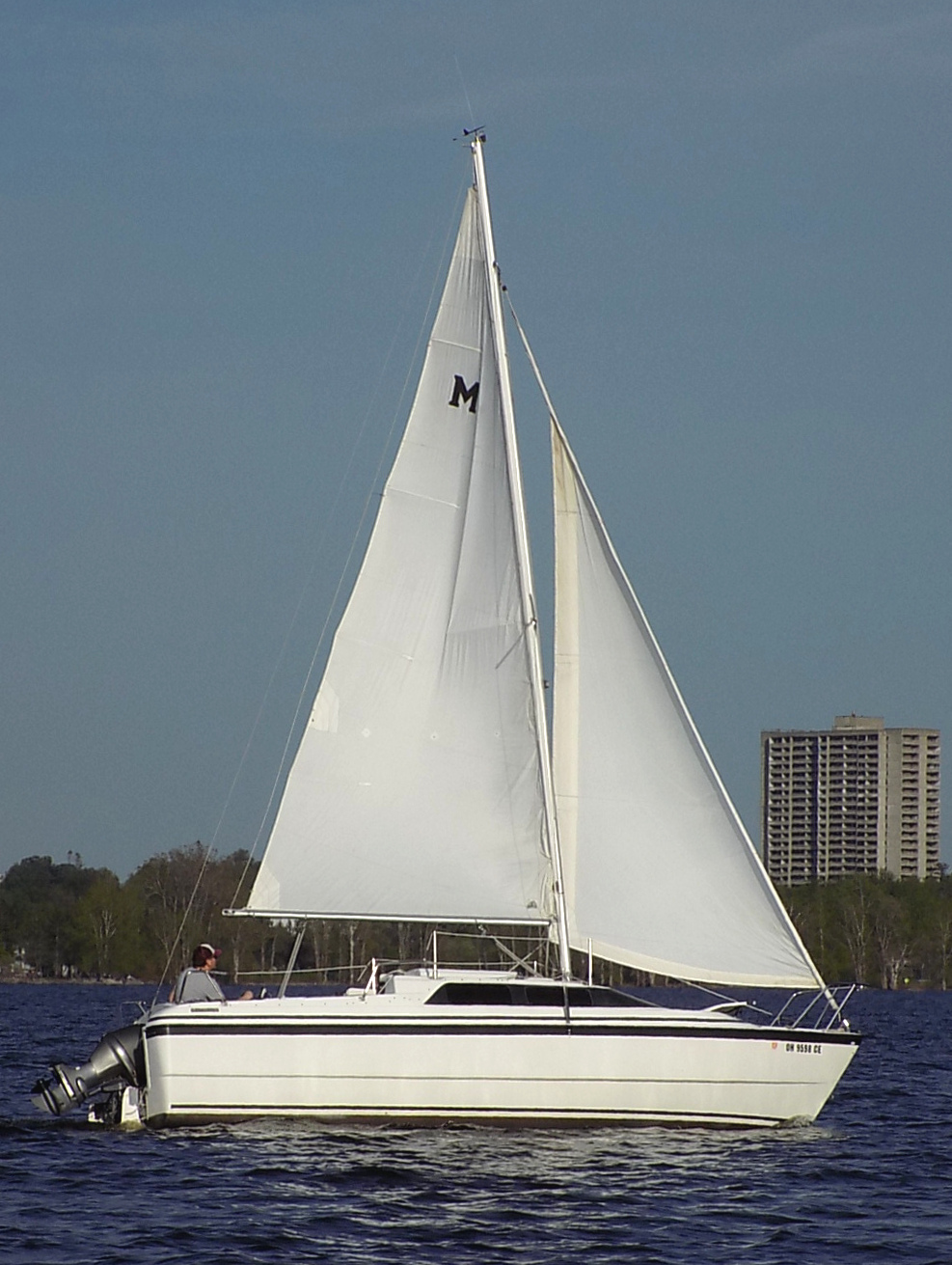
- MacGregor 26X

Development
- Designer: Roger MacGregor
- Location: United States
- Year: 1986–2013 (all models)
- No. built: 5000
- Builder: MacGregor Yacht Corporation
- Name: MacGregor 26 X

Boat
- Displacement: 2,250 lb (1,021 kg)
- Draft: 5.50 ft (1.68 m) with the centerboard down

Hull
- Type: Monohull
- Construction: Fiberglass
- LOA: 25.82 ft (7.87 m)
- LWL: 23.00 ft (7.01 m)
- Beam: 7.82 ft (2.38 m)
- Engine: outboard motor

Hull appendages
- Keel: centerboard
- Ballast: 1,500 lb (680 kg) of water
- Rudder: transom-mounted rudder

Rig
- General: Fractional rigged sloop
- I foretriangle height: 23.00 ft (7.01 m)
- J foretriangle base: 9.67 ft (2.95 m)
- P mainsail luff: 25.00 ft (7.62 m)
- E mainsail foot: 10.38 ft (3.16 m)

Sails
- Mainsail area: 129.75 sq ft (12.054 m^{2})
- Jib/genoa area: 111.21 sq ft (10.332 m^{2})
- Total sail area: 240.96 sq ft (22.386 m^{2})

The MacGregor 26 is a family of trailerable, water-ballasted sailboats. The earliest models, the 26D and 26S, were conceived primarily as sailing boats with auxiliary outboard power. Later variants, the 26X and 26M, evolved into hybrid sail–power designs. All versions were designed to be launched, recovered, and towed relatively easily. The rig can be raised single-handed.

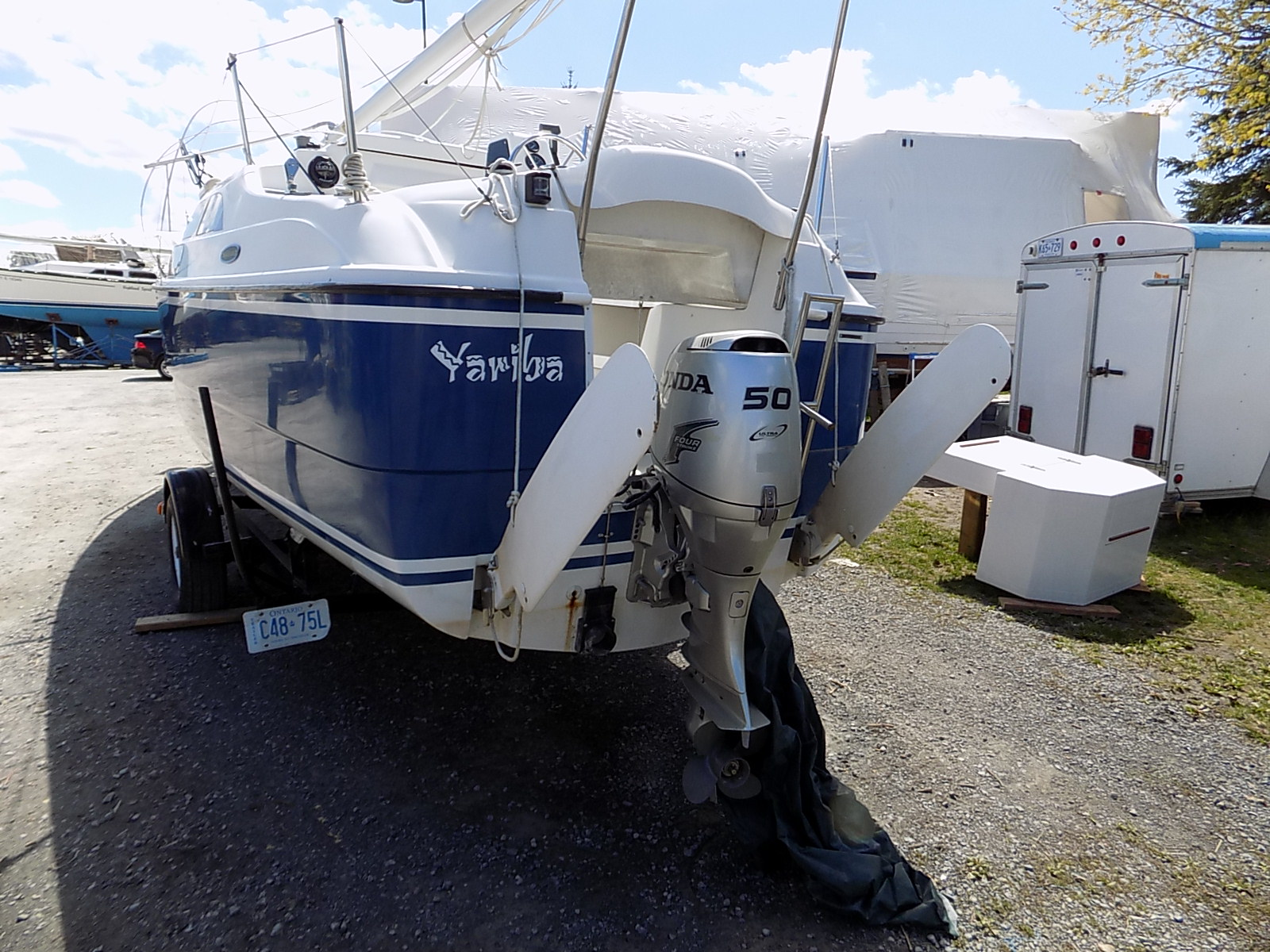
MacGregor 26M showing the dual rudder configuration

Designed by Roger MacGregor and produced by MacGregor Yacht Corporation between 1986 and 2013, it achieved high sales, thanks to its versatility and affordability. It was a development of the MacGregor 25, but instead of a swing keel, it had water ballast and a 600 pound centerboard. The newer hybrid model has a hull designed for planing, and can be operated at 20 knots under power.

The fiberglass hull has a through-bolted hull-deck joint. Positive flotation is built into the cabin at the cost of stowage space. There are no side decks.

== Variants ==
Variant	Years produced	Board type	Ballast type	No. built	Typical engine size
26D	1986–1989	Daggerboard	water	~6,000 (D&S combined)	8–9.9 hp
26S	1990–1995	Centerboard	water	~6,000 (D&S combined)	8–9.9 hp
26X	1995–2003	Centerboard	water	~5,000 (est.)	up to 50 hp
26M	2003–2013	Daggerboard	water + fixed ballast	~5,000 (est.)	up to 50 hp
