= Sun 2000 =

2000s French recreational keelboat

Development
- Designer: Olivier Petit
- Location: France
- Year: 1999
- No. built: 1470
- Builder: Jeanneau
- Role: Cruiser
- Name: Sun 2000

Boat
- Displacement: 2,756 lb (1,250 kg)
- Draft: 5.16 ft (1.57 m) with centerboard down

Hull
- Type: monohull
- Construction: fiberglass
- LOA: 21.75 ft (6.63 m)
- LWL: 19.00 ft (5.79 m)
- Beam: 8.33 ft (2.54 m)
- Engine: outboard motor

Hull appendages
- Keel: centerboard
- Ballast: 794 lb (360 kg)
- Rudder: transom-mounted rudder

Rig
- Rig type: Bermuda rig
- I foretriangle height: 26 ft 11 in (8.20 m)
- P mainsail luff: 27 ft 1 in (8.26 m)

Sails
- Sailplan: 9/10 fractional rigged sloop
- Mainsail area: 152 sq ft (14.1 m^{2})
- Jib/genoa area: 97 sq ft (9.0 m^{2})
- Spinnaker area: 344 sq ft (32.0 m^{2})
- Upwind sail area: 249 sq ft (23.1 m^{2})
- Downwind sail area: 496 sq ft (46.1 m^{2})

The Sun 2000 is a French sailboat that was designed by Olivier Petit as a cruiser and first built in 2000.

== Production ==
The design was built by Jeanneau in France, starting in 1999 and ending in 2010, with 1,470 boats built.

== Design ==
The Sun 2000 is a recreational sailboat, built predominantly of polyester fiberglass. The hull is made from solid fiberglass, while the deck is an injection molded fiberglass sandwich. It has a 9/10 fractional sloop rig, with a deck-stepped mast, a single set of swept spreaders and aluminum spars with stainless steel wire rigging. The hull has a plumb stem and transom, a transom-hung rudder controlled by a tiller and a retractable centerboard. It displaces 2,756 lb (1,250 kg) and carries 794 lb (360 kg) of ballast.

The boat has a draft of 5.16 ft (1.57 m) with the centerboard extended and 0.92 ft (0.28 m) with it retracted, allowing operation in shallow water, beaching or ground transportation on a trailer.

The boat is normally fitted with a small 5 to 8 hp (4 to 6 kW) outboard motor for docking and maneuvering.

The design has sleeping accommodation for four people, with a double "V"-berth in the bow and two straight settees in the main cabin around an oval table. The galley is located on both sides, amidships and is equipped with a small sink and has space for a portable stove. Cabin headroom is 50 in (127 cm).

For sailing downwind the design may be equipped with a symmetrical spinnaker of 344 sq ft (32.0 m^{2}).

The design has a hull speed of 6.02 kn (11.15 km/h)
