= Venture 21 =

1960s recreational keelboat

- V

Development
- Designer: Roger MacGregor
- Location: United States
- Year: 1966
- Builder: MacGregor Yacht Corporation
- Role: Racer-Cruiser
- Name: Venture 21

Boat
- Displacement: 1,500 lb (680 kg)
- Draft: 5.50 ft (1.68 m) with keel down

Hull
- Type: monohull
- Construction: fiberglass
- LOA: 21.00 ft (6.40 m)
- LWL: 18.50 ft (5.64 m)
- Beam: 6.83 ft (2.08 m)
- Engine: outboard motor

Hull appendages
- Keel: swing keel
- Ballast: 400 lb (181 kg)
- Rudder: transom-mounted rudder

Rig
- Rig type: Cutter rig
- I foretriangle height: 24.08 ft (7.34 m)
- J foretriangle base: 7.67 ft (2.34 m)
- P mainsail luff: 21.83 ft (6.65 m)
- E mainsail foot: 9.75 ft (2.97 m)

Sails
- Sailplan: cutter rigged sloop
- Mainsail area: 106.42 sq ft (9.887 m^{2})
- Jib/genoa area: 92.35 sq ft (8.580 m^{2})
- Total sail area: 198.77 sq ft (18.466 m^{2})

Racing
- PHRF: 252

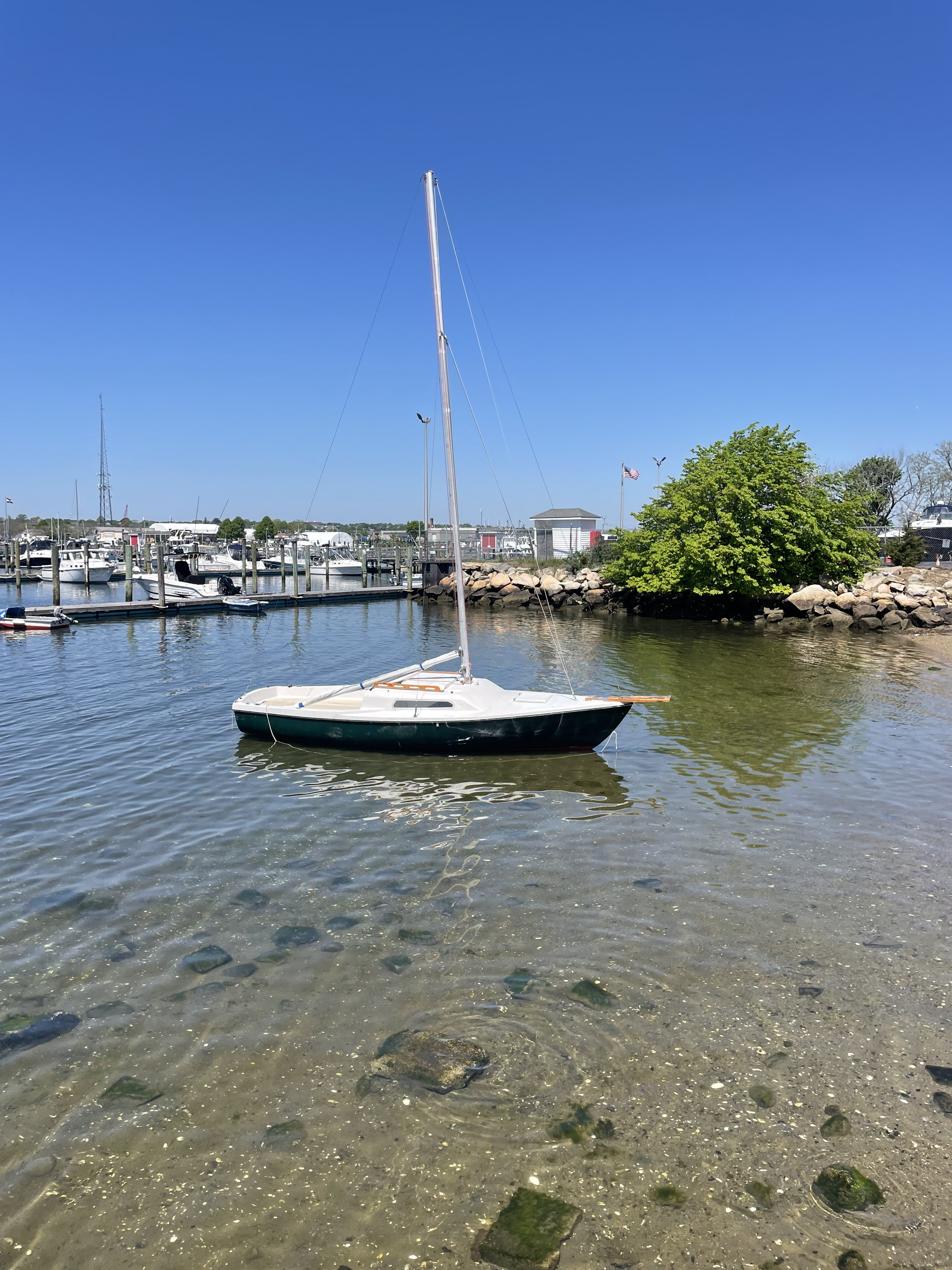
This Venture 21 demonstrates its shallow draft capabilities allowed by retracting the swing keel.

The Venture 21 is a recreational keelboat built from 1966 to 1979. It was the first monohull boat produced by MacGregor Yacht Corporation.

It was designed by Roger MacGregor as part of his Stanford University Master of Business Administration degree program, with a prototype built in 1965 and then put into production. It was developed into the MacGregor 21 in 1980.

It has a fiberglass hull. Early production boats had a plywood-cored deck, while later ones were balsa-cored. It has a spooned raked stem, a slightly angled transom, a transom-hung rudder controlled by a tiller and a swing keel. The boat has a draft of 5.50 ft (1.68 m) with the keel extended and 1.50 ft (0.46 m) with it retracted.

The design has sleeping accommodation for four people, with a double "V"-berth in the bow cabin and two straight settee berths in the main cabin. Cabin headroom is 48 in (122 cm).

It has a cutter rig and may be equipped with a symmetrical spinnaker.

The design has a PHRF racing average handicap of 252 and a hull speed of 5.8 kn (10.7 km/h).

== Reception ==
Boat reviewer Darrell Nicholson noted, "capitalizing on the fiberglass revolution in boatbuilding, MacGregor’s business-school project sparked a pivotal marketing shift that helped bring recreational sailing to mainstream America".

In a 2010 review Steve Henkel wrote, "best features: Price (on the used market, of course, since this design is no longer made) is below her comp[etitor]s, reflecting an ultra-low price when she was new—and perhaps some perceptions of the level of construction quality. Worst features: Headroom is lowest of the group of comp[etitor]s. Motion Index is worst of the group (though all her comp[etitor]s are so low it doesn't make much difference). Her Space Index is also at the bottom of the list. Her cast iron keel, like that on her comp[etitor]s, is a maintenance chore, since it eventually begins to need frequent attention to keep rust at bay. Hardware is not as high quality as her comps."

In a 2011 used boat review in Practical Sailor, Darrell Nicholson wrote, "with two quarter berths and a V-berth, the Venture 21 technically could sleep four, but this sort of arrangement probably would be brief and acrimonious. Although you could pack a lot of gear under the cockpit, actual locker storage is limited. Some ambitious owners have added sinks, small galleys, 12-volt systems, and port-a-potties below, but the boat’s cramped headroom restricts its suitability for more than a few days of cruising. For the 20-something adventurer with aspirations of camp-cruising on one of America’s many inland lakes, it will do just fine, but more than a couple of days aboard a boat this size will be a sure test of any marriage."
