= Santa Cruz Yachts =

American yacht design and manufacturing company (1973–)

Santa Cruz Yachts was an American yacht design and manufacturing company. The company's offices and production facilities were located in Santa Cruz, California, before being moved to Green Cove Springs, Florida. Santa Cruz Yachts has produced award-winning designs and these boats have performed well in racing including long-distance ocean racing.

== History ==
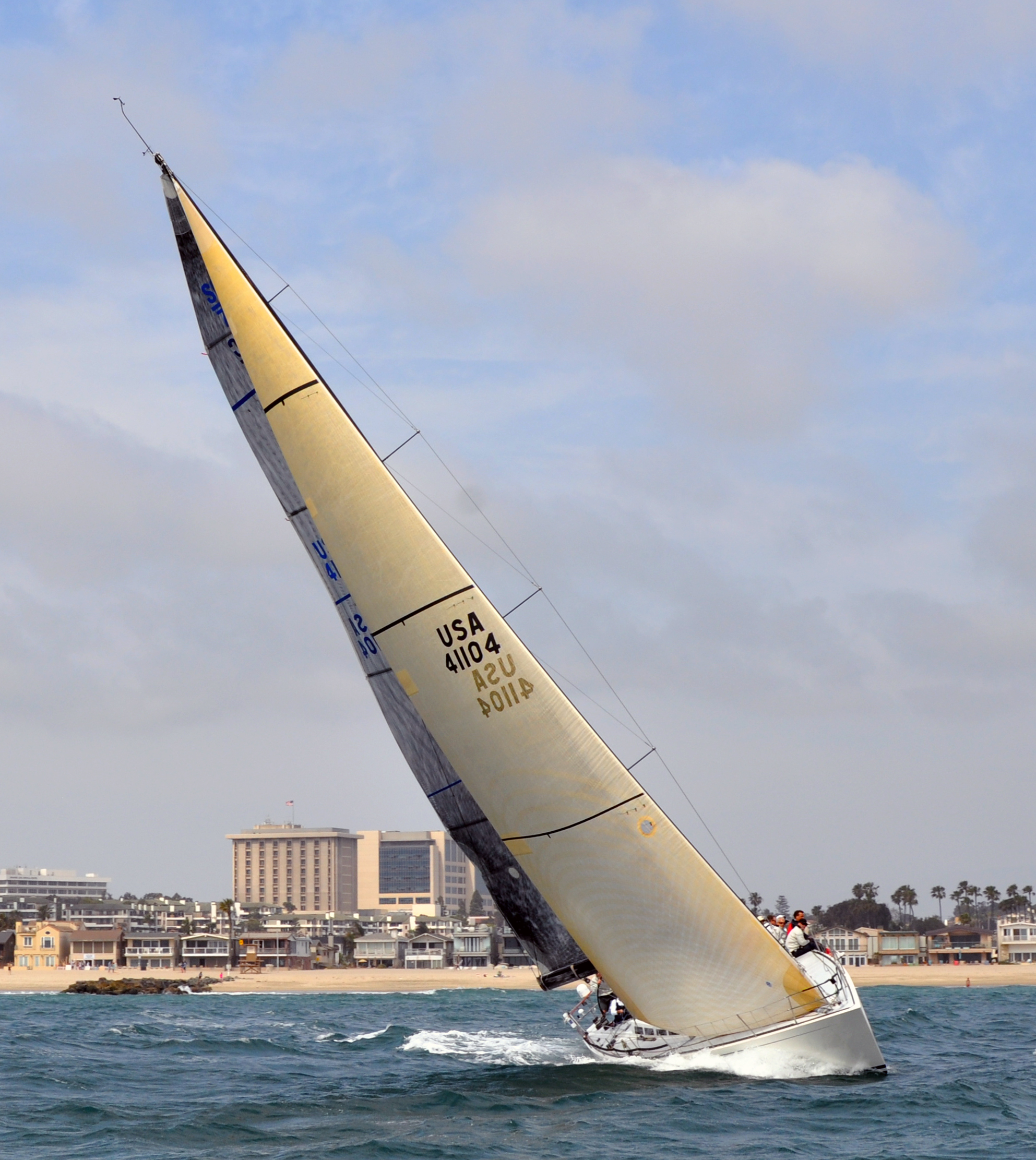
Santa Cruz 70 "Retro" off Newport Beach California

Santa Cruz Yachts was founded under the name Bill Lee Yachts, after the founder Bill Lee. They were originally located in “the chicken coop” in Santa Cruz, California.

The company's focus was on producing ultra-light, high-performance racing yacht designs, generally offering amenities for long-distance voyages. In 1977, the 66-foot (20 m) Merlin model was considered unseaworthy by critics; however, the boat proved to be capable of 28 knots (52 km/h) surfing and won the 1977 Transpacific Yacht Race from California to Hawaii in record time, with an average speed of 11 knots (20 km/h) over 2,250 miles. In 1981, the Merlin model again won the Transpac, but this time seven of the top ten finishes were the Santa Cruz 50, a scaled down production version of Merlin. A 50-foot (15 m) Santa Cruz yacht weighs about 16,000 pounds, with half of that weight in the ballast of the keel; this is very light compared to the 30,000 pounds normally associated with a 50-foot (15 m) boat.

== Modern history ==
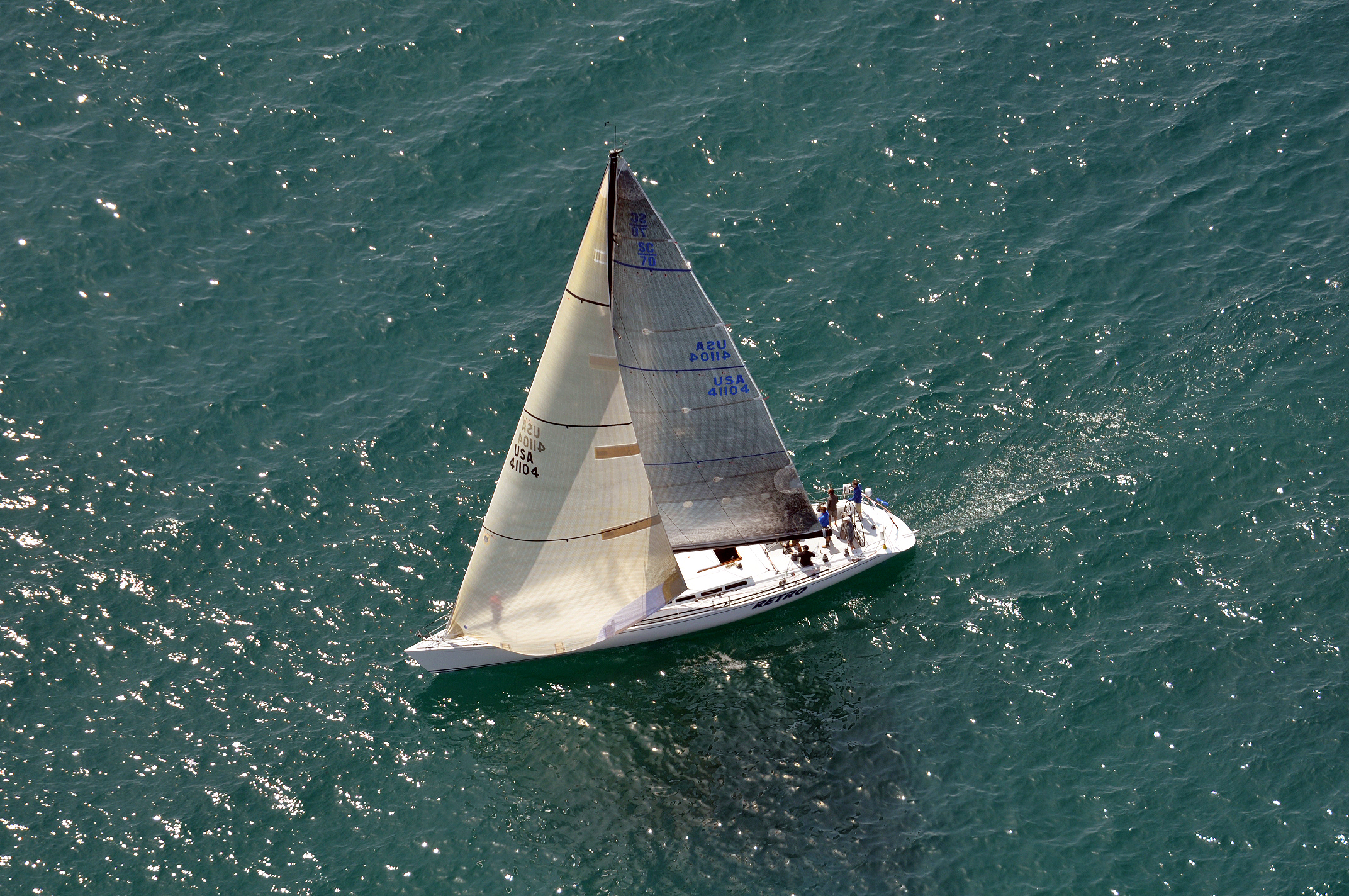
SC70 RETRO prior to the start of the 2013 NHYC Newport to Cabo San Lucas race

Santa Cruz Yachts produced boats made-to-order. The $600,000 base price was easily exceeded to over $1 million. The Santa Cruz 53, with a base price of about $850,000, was a substantially more luxurious and heavier adaptation of the 52.

To make their boats ultra-light, the company used balsa wood-cored hulls. This was criticised since the boats need to be reefed in relatively lower winds, when heading to the wind; however, others argued this deficiency was offset by their boats' performances in the downwind leg of a race.

Santa Cruz manufactured a 61-foot (19 m) power boat named the Coastal Flyer, which was sold for about $750,000. It was designed to look like a 1930s launch, but came with modern electronics and jet drive propulsion.

Recently Santa Cruz Yachts changed owners and underwent a "renovation period" in an attempt to revive the brand. Within the last year, Santa Cruz has designed a new boat, the SC37. It received good responses in both the Newport Boat Show 2008 and the Annapolis Boat 2008. The designer that the company was working with at the time was Tim Kernan.

== Awards ==
- Sailing World's Boat of the Year, 1996, for the Santa Cruz 52

== Models ==
NOTE: PHRF rating shown is the Northern California Base Rate full keel standard mast, unless otherwise described.

- SC27 - PHRF 135
- SC33 - PHRF 114
- SC37 - PHRF 28
- SC40 - PHRF 48
- SC44 -
- SC50 - PHRF -6
- SC52 - PHRF -30 to -6, Sailing World Magazine Overall "Boat Of The Year" winner in 1996
- SC70 - PHRF -66
- Coastal Flyer 61 (motor launch)

== See also ==
- List of sailboat designers and manufacturers
