= Trailer sailer =

Cruising sailboat that is easily towed and launched

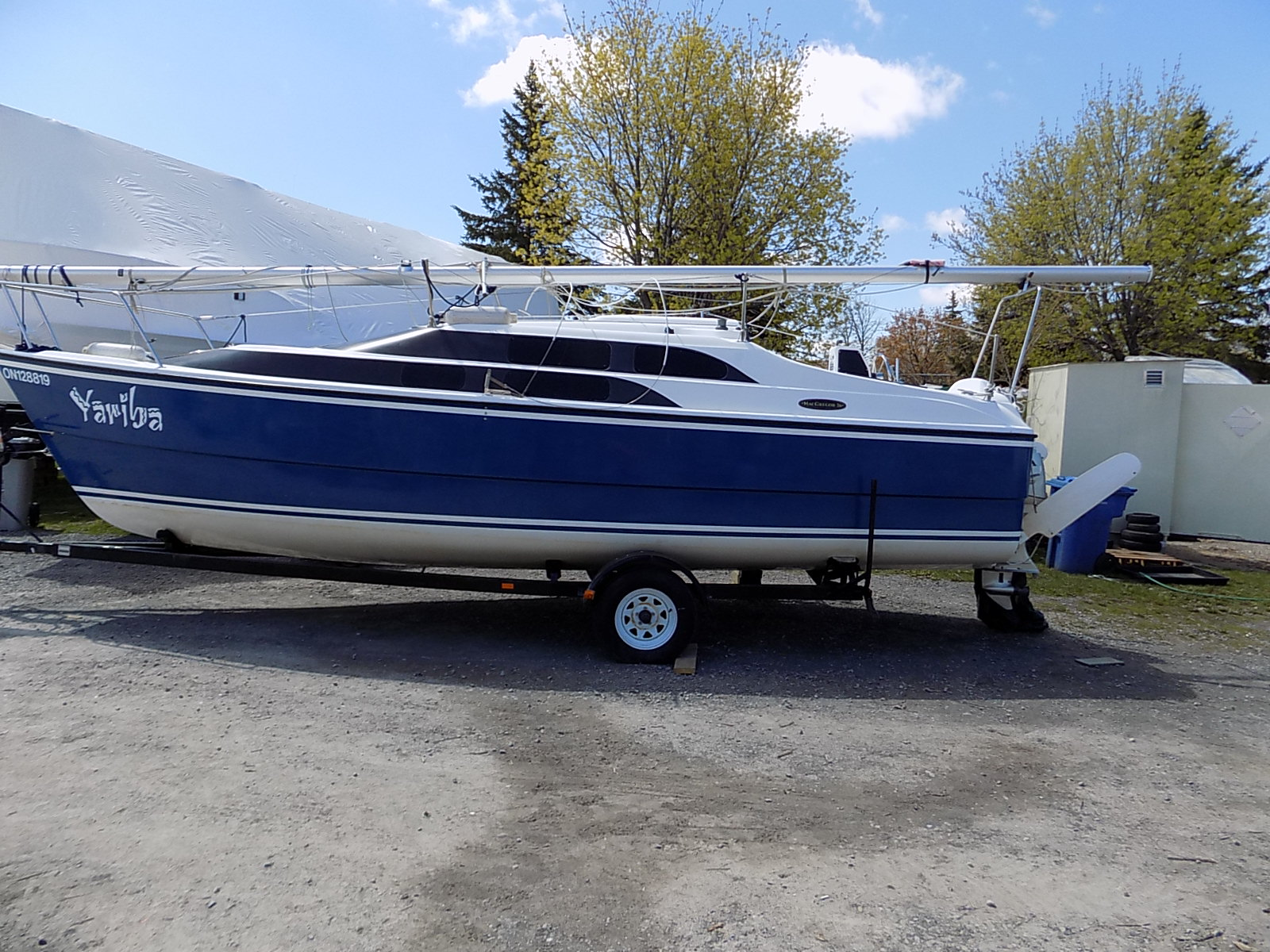
MacGregor 26M motor-sailer on its trailer

A trailer sailer is a keelboat that is big enough to accommodate crew for a weekend cruise, yet small enough to be launched, rigged, and recovered single-handed. It is also relatively easy to haul on a trailer behind a car, which requires low displacement and a shallow draft.

Although many small yachts can in principle be moved on a trailer, not all qualify as trailer sailers. The term is generally reserved for cabin sailboats intended for regular ramp launching. It does not apply to dinghies or small open keelboats under about 19 feet, since these are almost always easy to tow due to their characteristic light weight and shallow draft.

== History ==
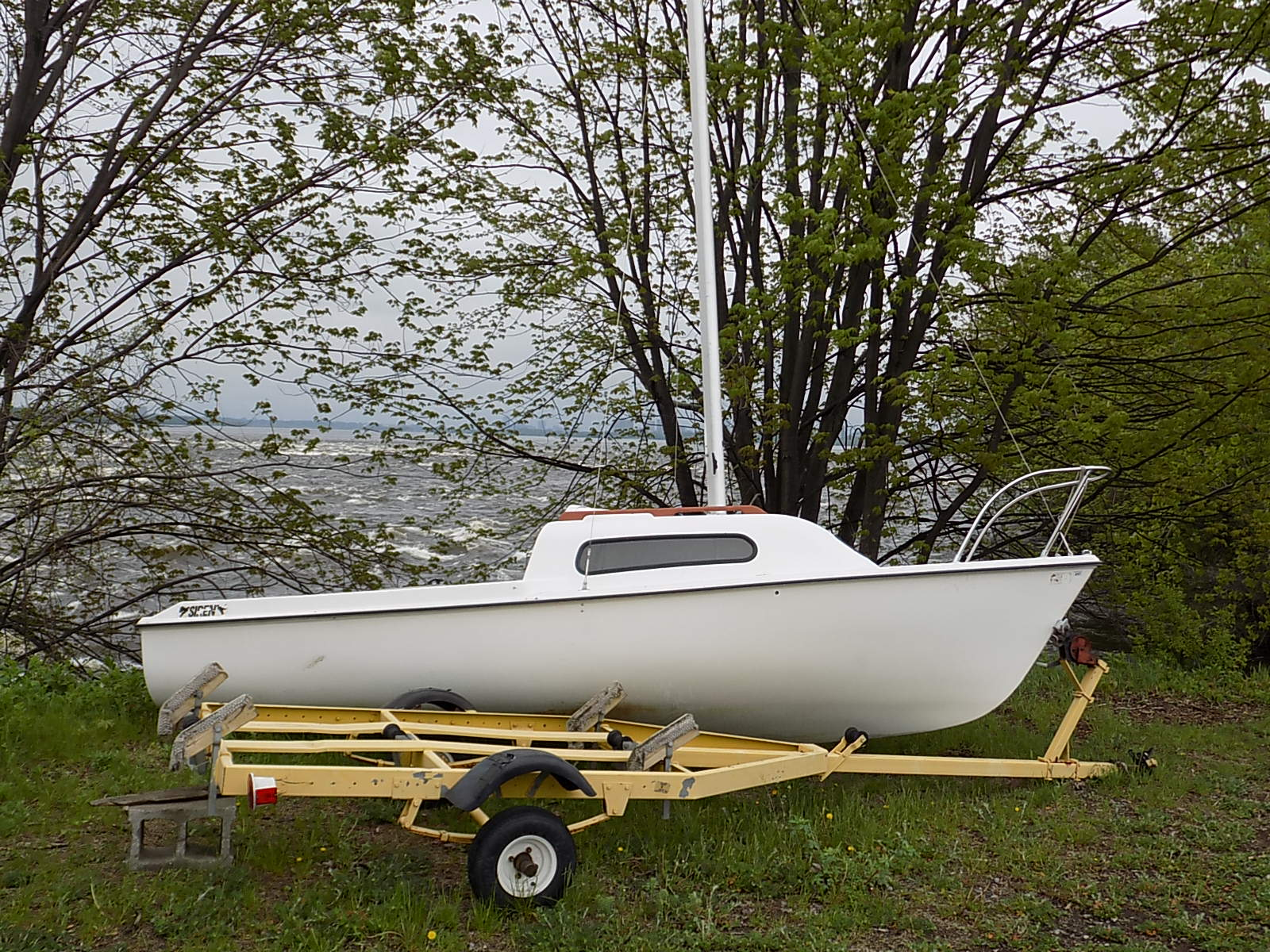
Siren 17 with its trailer.

The first trailer sailers were built in the 1950s. They were light, marine plywood boats designed for home builders. Robert Tucker in the UK designed the Silhouette, in the early 1950s. His concept was to build a small boat suitable for overnight camping, which could be trailed to different locations behind a small car. It is thought that over 3000 of this type have been built. In the mid-1950s, Richard Hartley of New Zealand designed the Hartley TS16, a 16 ft long trailer sailer with a towing weight of 600 kilograms (1,300 lb). The TS16 was built in large numbers in New Zealand and Australia, spurring the popularity of trailer sailers in these countries. Over 12,000 boats of this type have been built.

The advent of mass production fibreglass boats in the mid 1960s saw an expansion of trailer sailer designs, such as the Aquarius 21 Boomerang 20, Cal 21, Careel 18, Neptune 16, and Pearson 22.

Timeline of popular models:

- 1950s: Boomerang 20, Dolphin 24.
- 1960s: Venture 21, Careel 18, Aquarius 23. Introduced in 1969, the Catalina 22 has sold 16000 units as of 2023.
- 1970s: O'Day 22, West Wight Potter 19, Edel 540, Paceship PY 23.
- 1980s: Precision 21, MacGregor 26 (also a motorsailer, sold more than 7,000 units).
- 1990s: Beneteau First 210, Hunter 23.5.
- Since 2000: Jeanneau Sun 2000, Beneteau First 24SE.

== Characteristics ==
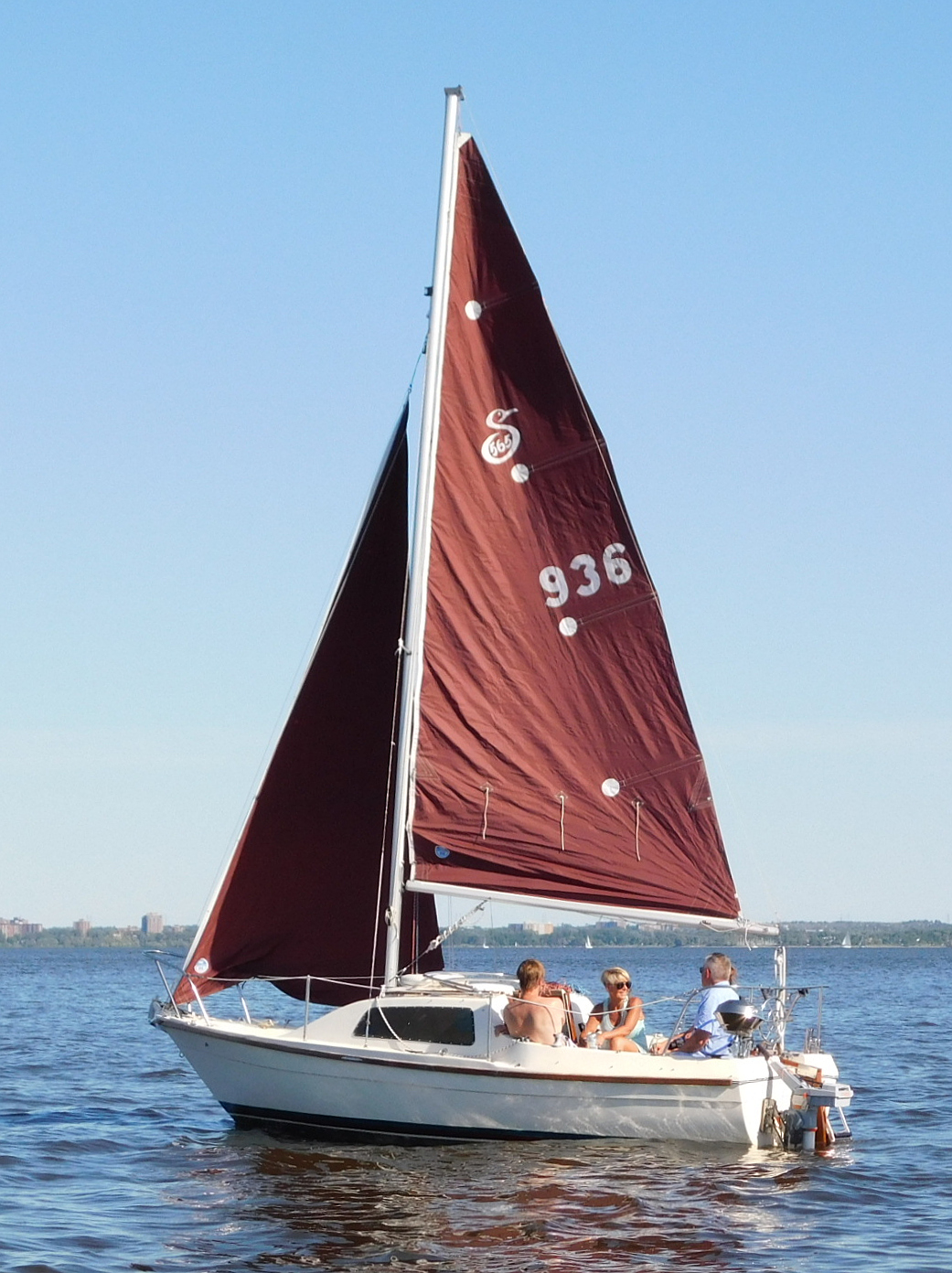
Sandpiper 565

A trailer sailer should be easy to launch and recover. A key component of that is its draft, and 2 feet (0.61 m) or less is preferred. This excludes hulls with a deep fixed keel. Various options have been tried including a long, shallow keel, as seen on many Com-Pac boats, and the O’Day22. However this design does not produce good performance to windward, so most designs achieve a shallow draft via centreboards or swing keels.

Most have an outboard rudder. Some have a pop-top to increase cabin headroom.

The beam should be under 2.5 metres (8.2 ft) and the boat must weigh not more than around 1,000 kilograms (2,200 lb). One way to reduce weight is to use water ballast, as done in the Hunter 23.5, and the MacGregor 26.

Ease of setting up the rig in a parking lot is essential. Beneteau and Jeanneau have developed mast lifting kits with a gin-pole and stability cables.

== See also ==
- Pocket cruiser – Term for a relatively small cruising boat
- Sportsboat – Poorly defined sailboat type
