= List of sailing boat types =

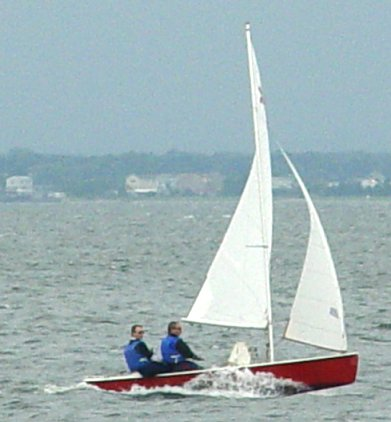
A Windmill sailing dinghy

The following is a partial list of sailboat types and sailing classes, including keelboats, dinghies, and multihull (catamarans and trimarans).

== Olympic classes ==
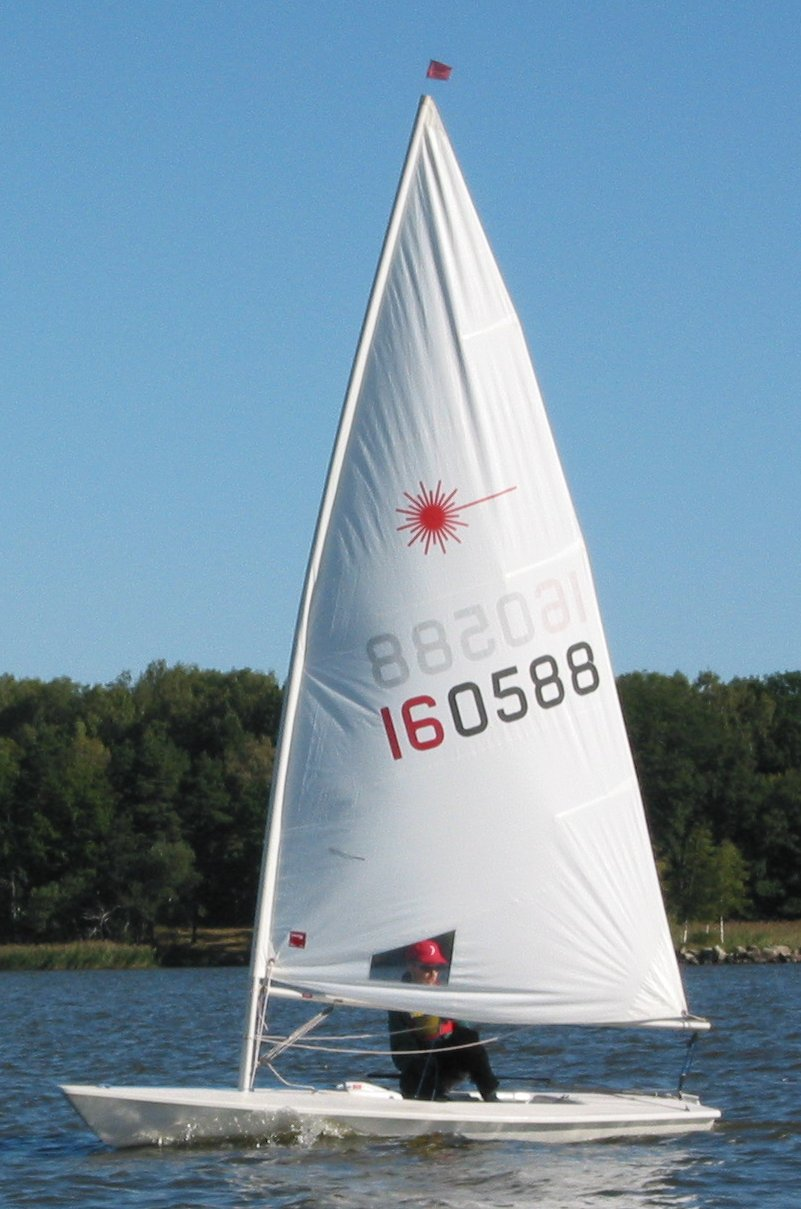
Laser

Name	Year of first construction	Designer	Builder	Notes
470	1963	André Cornu	Several	
49er	1999	Julian Bethwaite	Several	
49er FX	2010	Julian Bethwaite	Several	
Finn	1949	Rickard Sarby	Several	
ILCA 7	1970	Bruce Kirby	Several	
ILCA 6	1982	Bruce Kirby	Several	
Nacra 17	2012	Morrelli & Melvin	NACRA	
iQFoil	2018	Tiesda You	Several	
Formula Kite	Various	Several	Several	

== World Sailing Classes ==
Historically known as the IYRU (International Yacht Racing Union), the organization evolved into the ISAF (International Sailing Federation) in 1996, and as of December 2015 is now World Sailing.

=== Dinghies ===
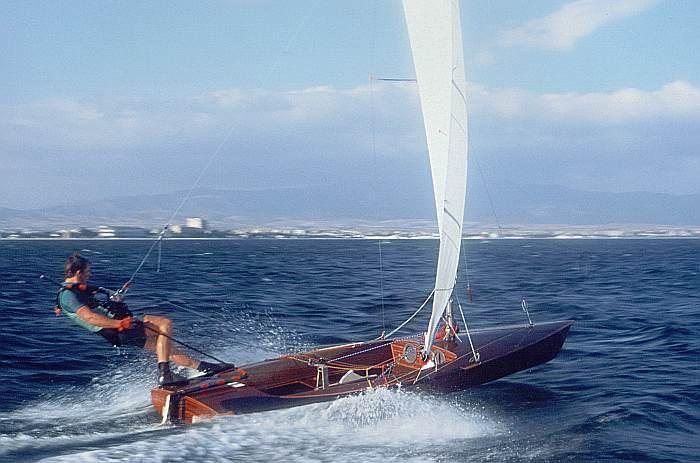
Contender

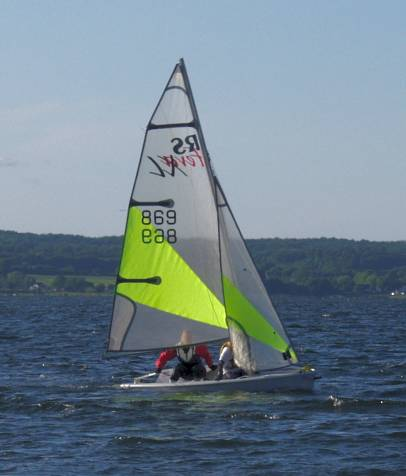
RS Feva

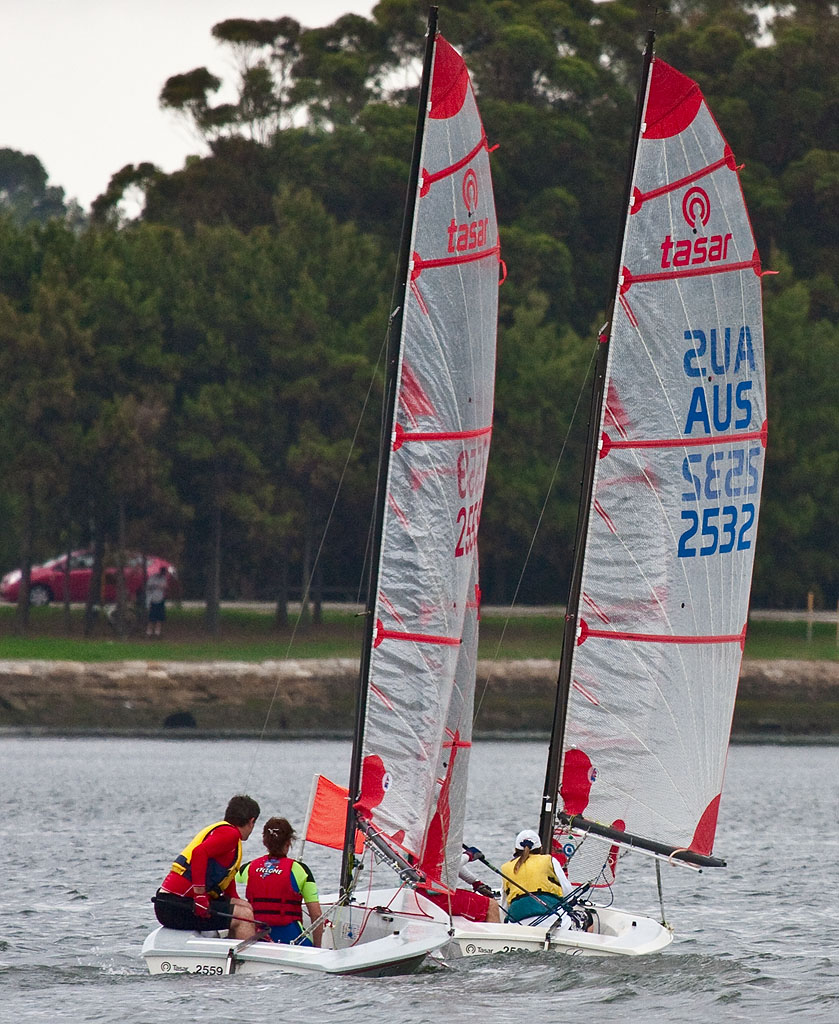
Two Tasars

Name	Number built	Year of first construction	Designer	Builder	Notes
420	56,000	1959	Christian Maury	Several	
470		1963	Christian Maury	Several	
505		1954	John Westell	Several	
Albacore		1950	Uffa Fox	Several	
B14		1986	Julian Bethwaite	Several	
Byte	2500	1973	Ian Bruce	Byte Boats Inc, / LaserPerformance	
Cadet		1947	Jack Holt	Several	
Contender		1967	Ben Lexcen	Several	
Enterprise		1956	Jack Holt	Several	
Europe		1963	Pierre Marique/Alois Roland	Several	
Fireball		1962	Peter Milne	Several	
Flying Dutchman		1951	Uus Van Essen/Conrad Gulcher	Several	
Flying Junior		1955	Uus Van Essen/Conrad Gulcher	Several	
Flying Scot	5300	1958	Gordon K. Douglass	Flying Scot Inc.	
GP14		1949	Jack Holt	Bell Woodworking Ltd. (UK)	
International 14		1928		Ovington Boats Ltd.	
Laser 2	8200	1978	Frank Bethwaite; Ian Bruce	Vanguard Sailboats	
Laser 4.7		2000	Bruce Kirby	LaserPerformance	
Lightning	15,550	1938	Sparkman & Stephens	Several	
Melges 15		2020	Reichel/Pugh	Several	
Mirror		1962			
Moth		1920s			Multiple updates since the original
Musto Performance Skiff		1999			
O'pen BIC		2006			
OK Dinghy		1956			
Optimist	400,000	1947	Clark Mills	Several	
RS Aero		2014	Jo Richards	RS Sailing	
RS Feva		2002	Paul Handley	RS Sailing	
RS Tera			Paul Handley	RS Sailing	
RS100		2009	Paul Handley	RS Sailing	
RS500			Phil Morrison	RS Sailing	
RS Vareo		2001	Phil Morrison	RS Sailing	
Snipe	32,000	1931	William Crosby	Several	
Solo		1956	Jack Holt		
Sunfish	300,000	1952	Alexander Bryan/Cortland Heyniger/Carl Meinart	Alcort/AMF; Vanguard (USA)	
Tasar		1975	Frank Bethwaite, Ian Bruce	Several	
Topaz Vibe		2006	Ian Howlett & Rob White	Topper International	
Topper		1977			
Topper Topaz		2010s		Topper International	
29er		2001	Julian Bethwaite	Several	
Vaurien		1952			
Zoom 8		1995			

=== Keelboats and yachts ===
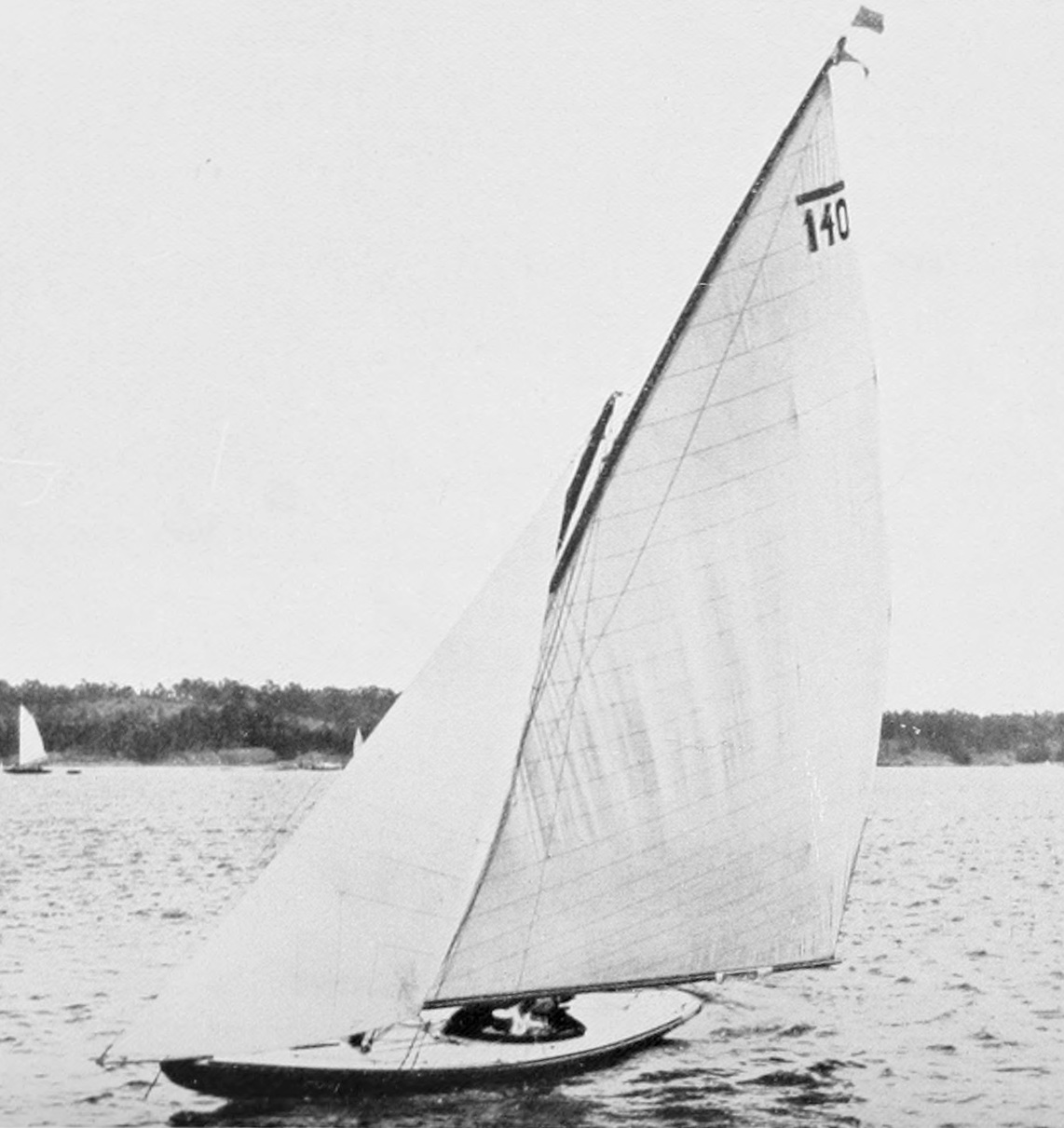
6 Metre

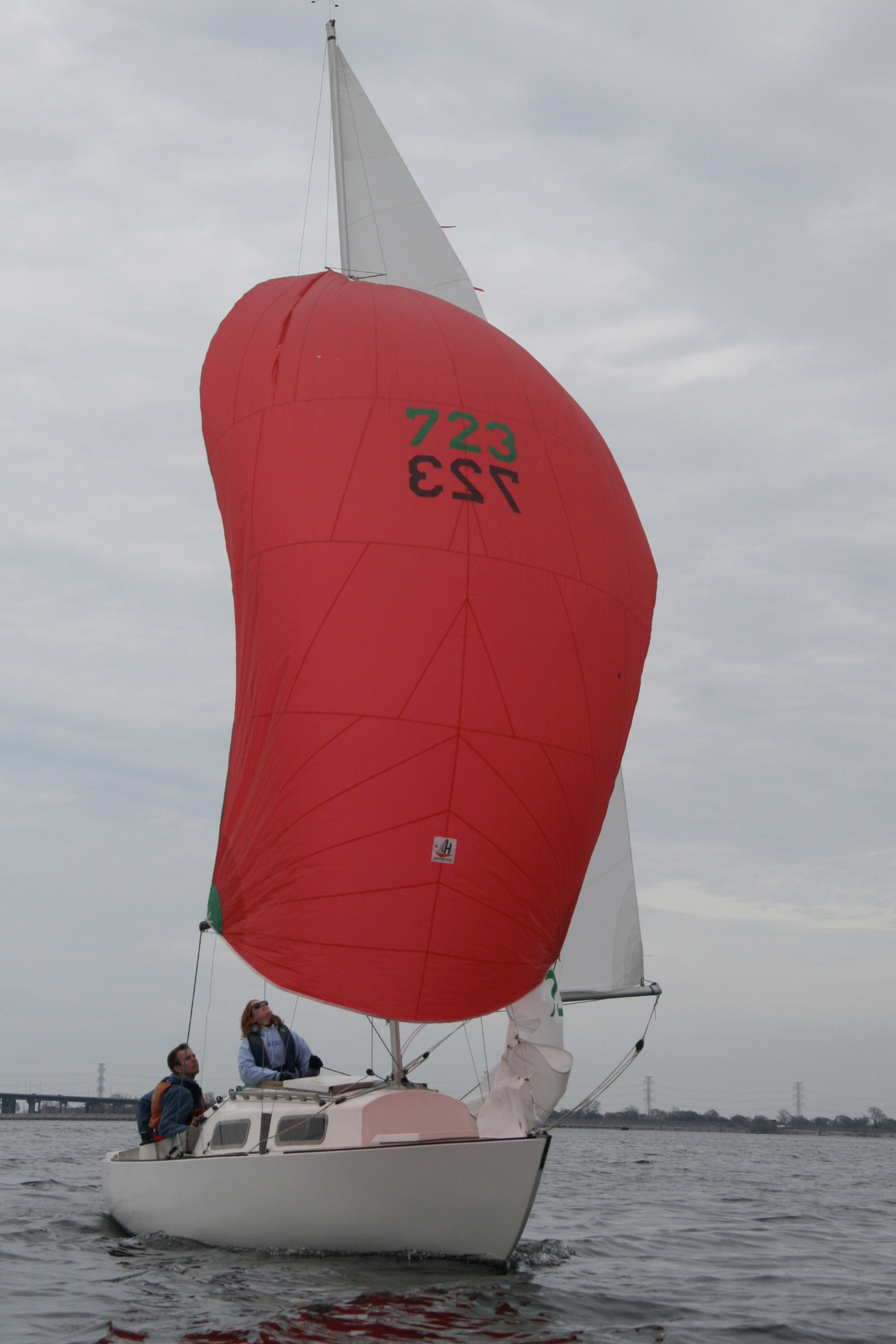
Shark 24

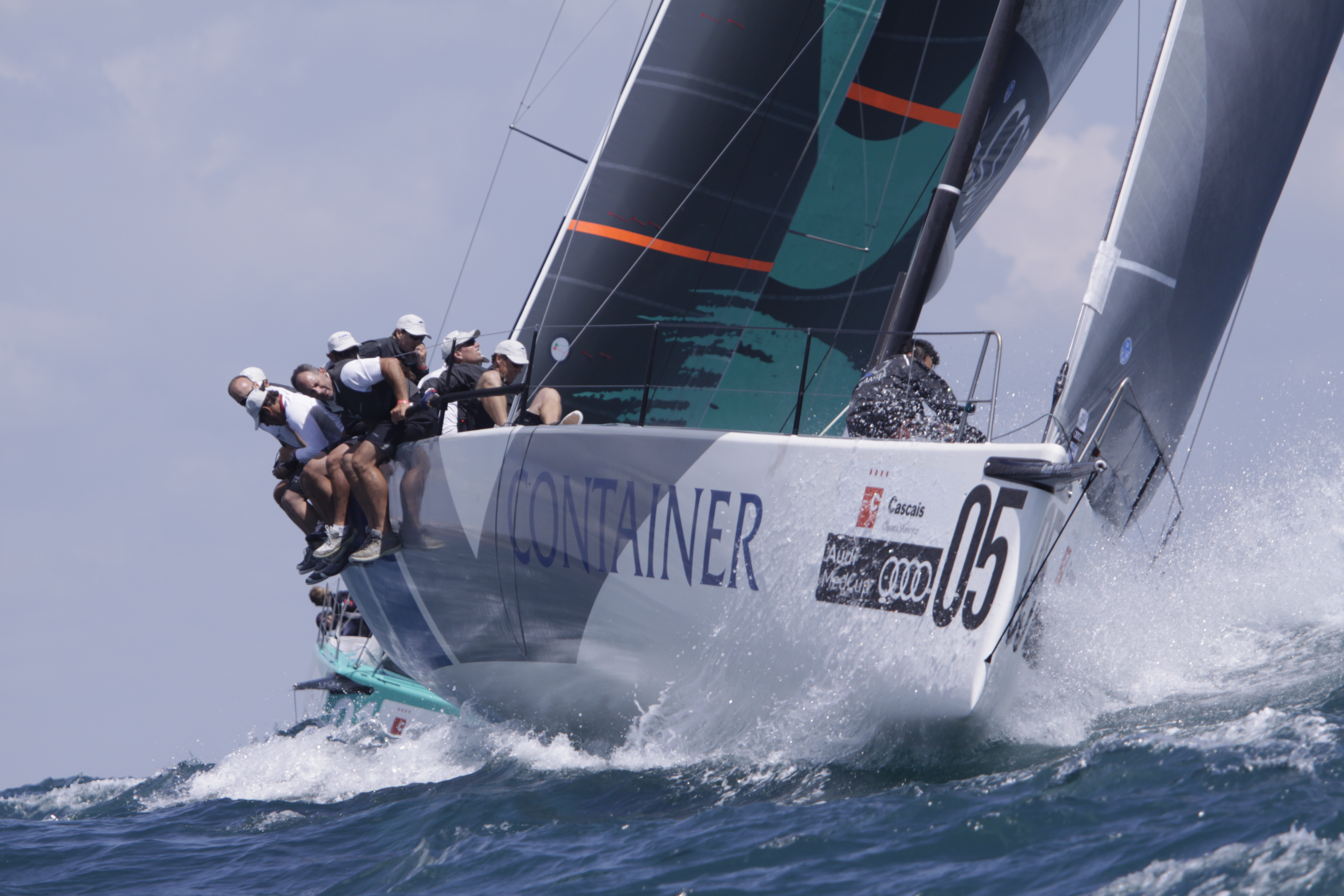
TP 52

Name	Year of first construction	Designer	Builder	Notes
12 Metre	1907	Development class		
2.4 Metre	1980	Development class		
5.5 Metre	1949	Development class		
6 Metre	1907	Development class		
8 Metre	1907	Development class		
Class40	2005	Development class		
ClubSwan 50	2015	Juan Kouyoumdjian	Nautor's Swan	
Dragon	1928	Johan Anker	Børresens, Petticrow's	
Etchells	1966	E. W. Etchells		
Farr 30 (Note: formerly known as Mumm 30)	1995	Bruce Farr	Beneteau; Carroll Marine dk Yachts; McDell Marine; Ovington Boats; Waterline Systems	
Farr 40	1996	Bruce Farr		
Flying 15	1947	Uffa Fox	Ovington Boats	
Hansa 2.3				
Hansa 303				
Hansa Liberty				
H-boat	1969	Hans Groop	Artekno, Botnia, Elvstrøm	
Hai	1930	Gunnar L. Stenbäck	Several	
IMOCA 60	1991	Development class		
J/111	2010	Alan Johnstone	J-Boats	
J/22	1983	Rod Johnstone	J-Boats	
J/24	1977	Rod Johnstone	J-Boats	
J/70	2012	Alan Johnstone	J-Boats	
J/80	1993	Rod Johnstone	J-Boats	
Maxi 72	2014			
Melges 20	2007	Reichel & Pugh	McConaghy Boats; Melges Performance Sailboats	
Melges 24	1992	Reichel & Pugh	Melges Performance Sailboats	
Melges 32	2005	Reichel & Pugh	Melges Performance Sailboats; SOCA Sailboats	
Micro				
Platu 25 (Note: formerly known as Beneteau 25)	1996	Bruce Farr	Bénéteau	
RC44	2007	Russell Coutts		
SB20 (Note: formerly known as Laser SB3)	2002			
Shark 24	1969	George Hinterhoeller	Korneuburg	
Soling	1969	Jan Herman Linge	Børresens	
Soto 40	2010	Javier Soto Acebal		
Sonar	1980			
Splash	1990			
Swan 45	2001	Germán Frers	Nautor's Swan	
Swan 60	1994			
Star	1910	Francis Sweisguth	Bootswerft Mader, others	
Tempest	1965	Ian Proctor		
TP 52	2001	Development class		
Viper 640	1996	Brian Bennett	Viper Boats, Rondar Raceboats	
Yngling	1967	Jan Herman Linge		
X-35	2006	Niels Jeppesen		
X-41	2007	Niels Jeppesen		

=== Multihulls ===
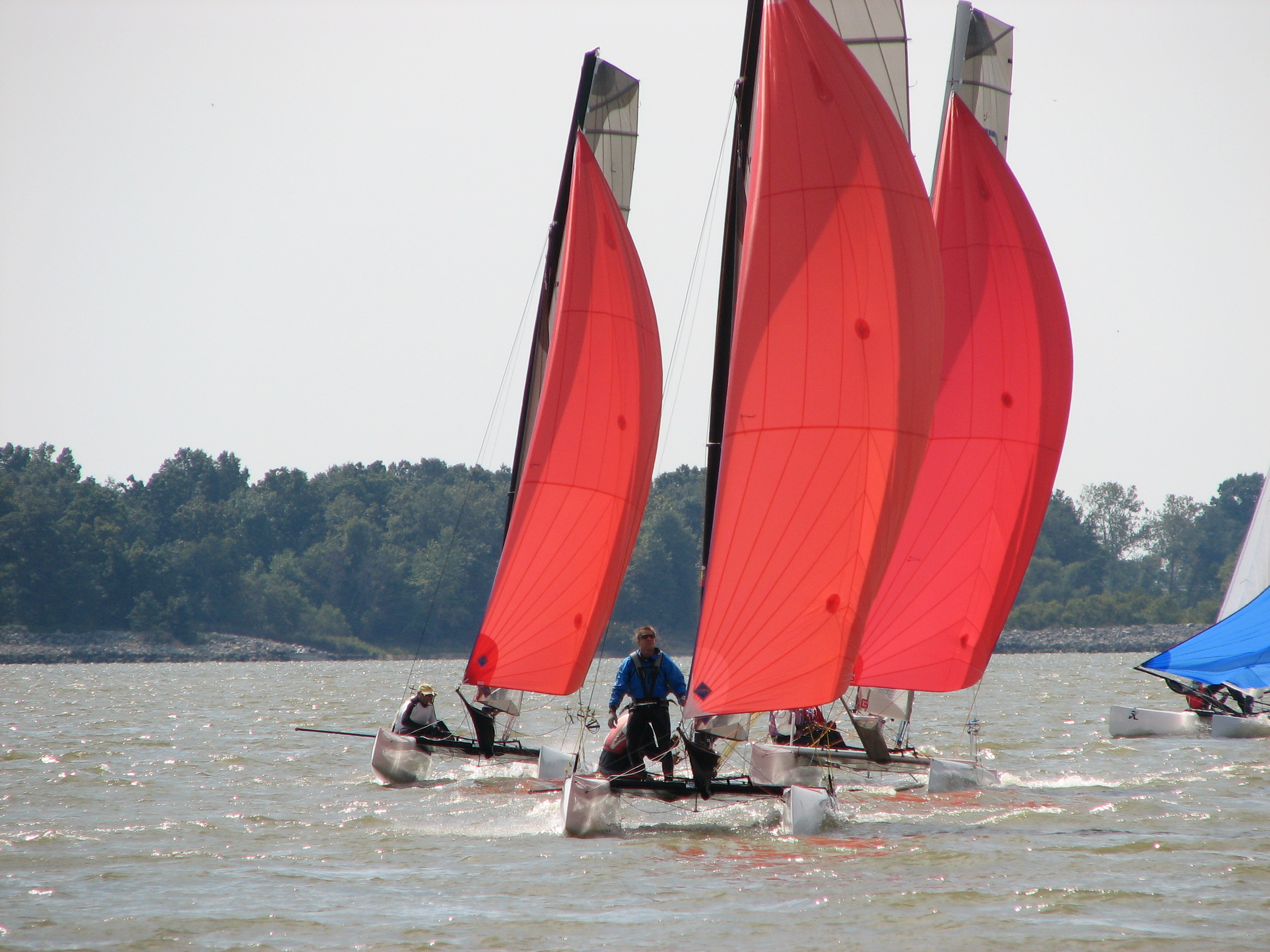
Three Formula 18s

Name	Year of first construction	Designer	Builder	Notes
A-Class		Development class		
Dart 18				
Formula 16		Development class		
Formula 18		Development class		
Hobie 14				
Hobie 16				
Hobie 17	1985	John Wake	Hobie Cat	
Hobie Dragoon				
Hobie Tiger	1995	Hobie Cat Europe	Hobie Cat Europe; Hobie Cat	
Hobie Wildcat				
M32	2010	Göran Marström/Kåre Ljung	Aston Harald Composite AB	
Nacra 20	1998	Morrelli & Melvin	Nacra Sailing	
Nacra Infusion	2008	Morrelli & Melvin	Nacra Sailing	
SL 16				
Topcat K1				
Tornado				
Viper F16				

=== Boards ===
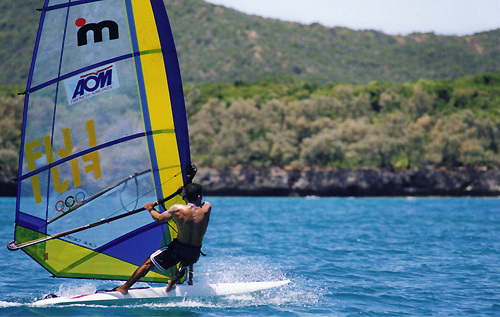
Mistral

Name	Year of first construction	Designer	Builder	Notes
Formula Experience				
Formula Kite				
Formula Windsurfing				
Funboard				
Kona				
Mistral				
Raceboard				
RS:One				
Speed Windsurfing				
Techno 293				

=== Radio-controlled ===
Name	Year of first construction	Designer	Builder	Notes
10 rater (10R)		Development class		
A Class (RA)		Development class		
Marblehead		Development class		
One Metre (IOM)		Development class		
65 Class				
NANO		Provisional class		

== Former World Sailing-classes ==
=== Dinghies ===
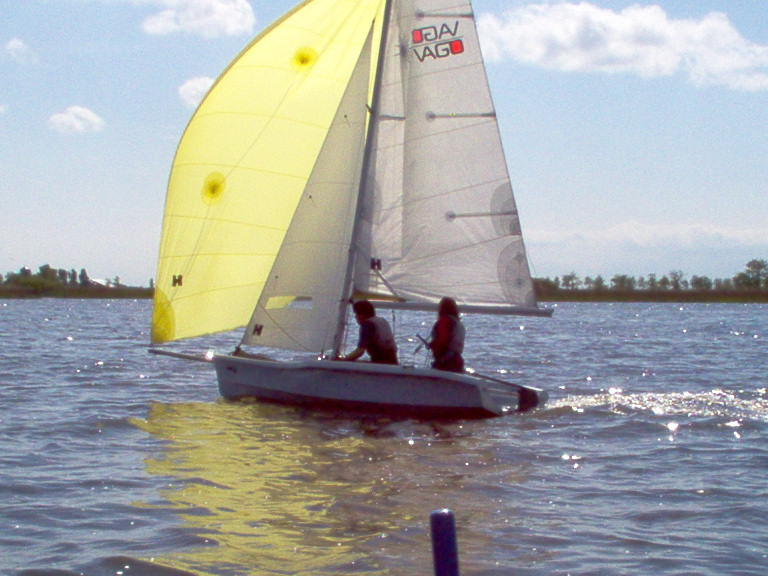
Laser Vago

Name	Year of first construction	Designer	Builder	Notes	Ref
29erXX					
Buzz	1994				
ISO	1993				
Laser Vago	2005				

=== Keelboats and yachts ===
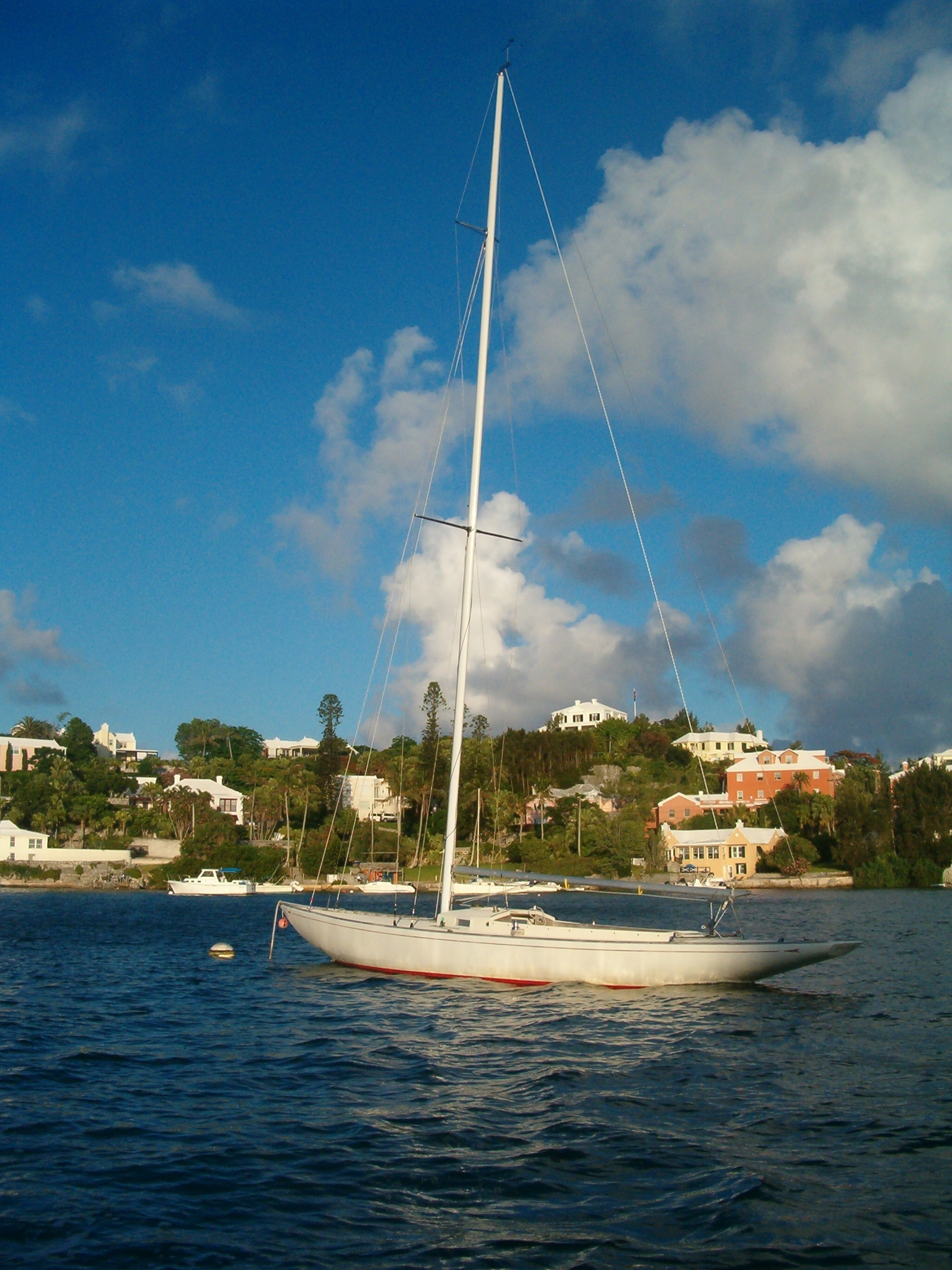
International One Design

Name	Year of first construction	Designer	Builder	Notes	Ref
11:Metre One Design	1991	Ron Holland	Rolf Gyhlenius		
Elliott 6m	2008				
Farr 45 (Note: formerly known as Corel 45)					
Farr Maxi One Design (Note: formerly known as Grand Mistral 80 and Ericsson 80)	1999?				
International One Design	1936	Bjarne Aas			
Mumm 36	1993				
Open 50		Development class			
Sydney 40	1990s (late)				
X-99	1981	Niels Jeppesen	X-Yachts		
Ultimate 20	1995	Jim Antrum	W. D. Schock Corp		
Mini Transgascogne	1988				

=== Multihulls ===
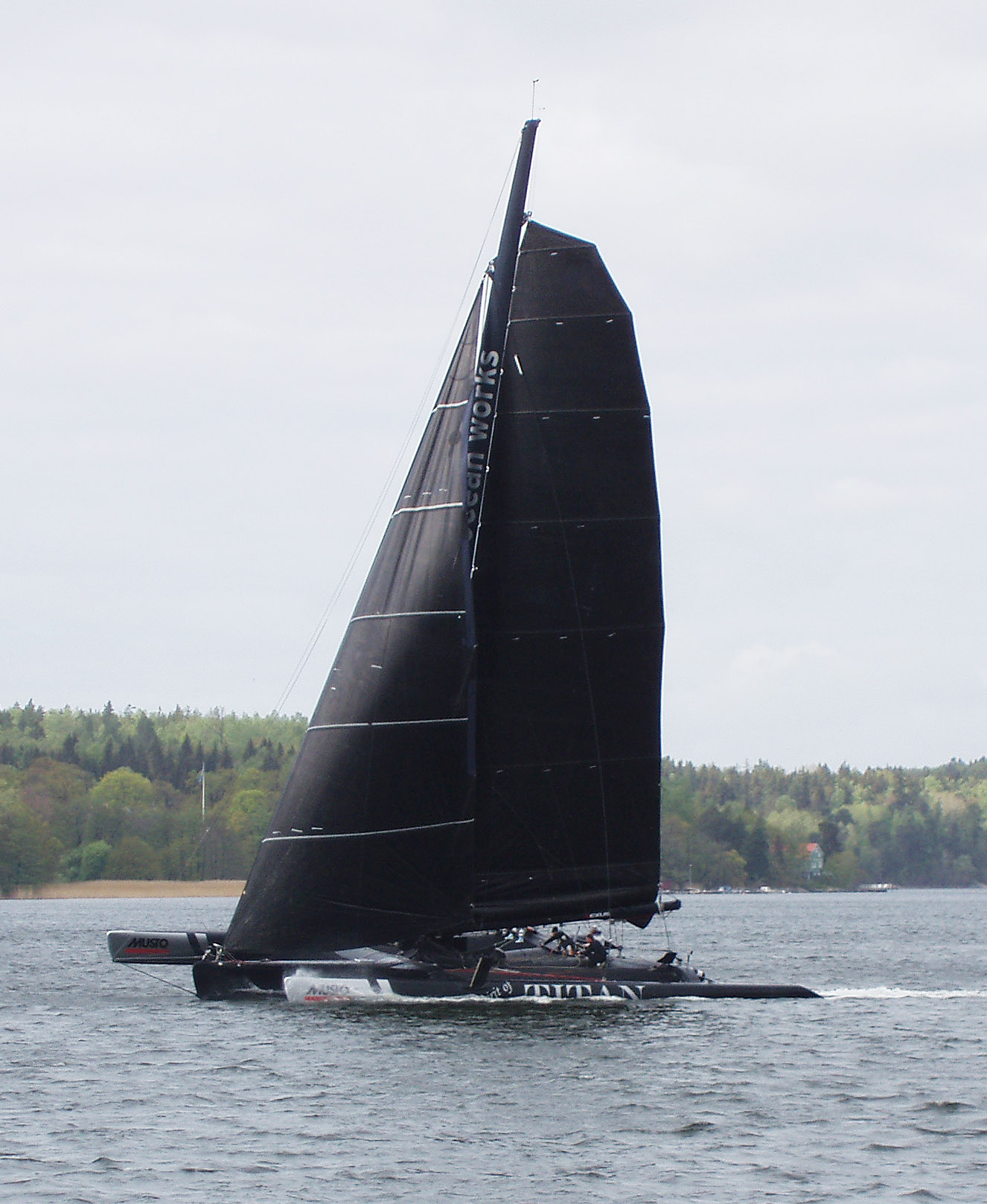
ORMA 60

Name	Year of first construction	Designer	Builder	Notes	Ref
C-Class	1960s	Development class			
Hobie 18	1976	Hobie Alter; Phil Edwards	Hobie Cat		
Nacra F18 Infusion	2007				
ORMA 60	1996	Development class			

=== Boards ===
Name	Year of first construction	Designer	Builder	Notes	Ref
Aloha					
Division I					
Division II					
Division III					
Lechner A-390					
Mistral Junior					
Windglider					

== Other classes and sailboat types ==
=== Dinghies ===
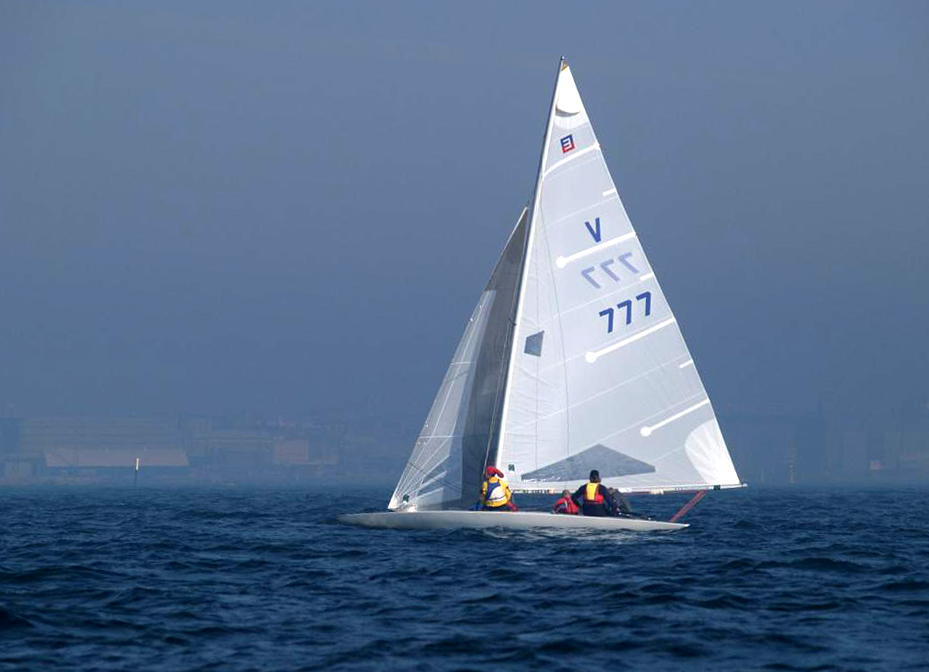
E Scow

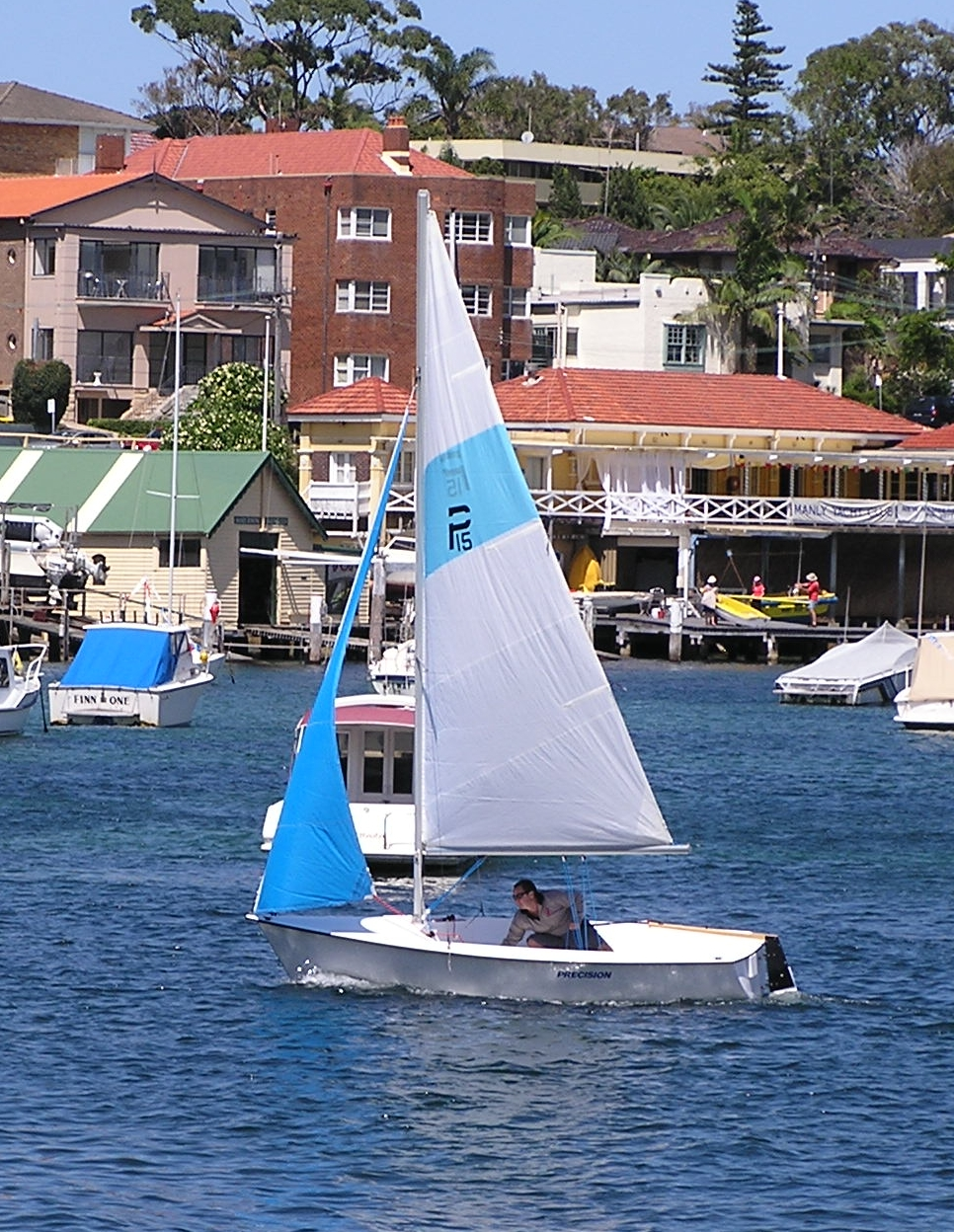
Precision 15

Name	Year of first construction	Designer	Builder	Notes	Ref
2000	1998			formerly the Laser 2000	
3000	1996			Cf. Laser 3000	
4000	1993	Phil Morrison	Rooster Sailing	Laser 4000	
AMF Apollo 16	1977	Bruce Kirby	American Machine and Foundry		
A Scow	1901	John O. Johnson	Johnson Boat Works; Melges Performance Sailboats		
Barnett 1400	1989	Ron & Gerry Hedlund	Barnett Boats & Windward Boatworks		
Beneteau First 14	2017	Samuel Manuard	Beneteau		
Beverly Dinghy	1953	A. Sidney DeWolf Herreshoff	Cape Cod Shipbuilding		
Blue Crab 11	1971	Harry R. Sindle	Lockley Newport Boats & Mobjack Manufacturing		
Bombardier 3.8	1974		Bombardier Limited		
Bombardier 4.8	1982	Bombardier Design	Bombardier Limited		
Bombardier Invitation	1973	Bombardier Design	Bombardier Limited		
Buccaneer 18	1966	Rod Macalpine-Downie and Dick Gibbs	Chrysler Corporation; Texas Marine Industries; Wellcraft Marine Corporation; Gloucester Yachts; Cardinal Yachts; Nickels Boatworks; WindRider LLC		
Buko MKI					
Buko MKII					
Bullet 14	1971		Newport Boats		
Cape Cod Frosty	1984	Thomas Leach	Sailpower Corp and Star Marine, amateur construction from plans		
Cape Cod Gemini	1955	A. Sidney DeWolf Herreshoff	Herreshoff Manufacturing Company; Cape Cod Shipbuilding		
Cape Cod Mercury 15	1940	Sparkman and Stephens	Cape Cod Shipbuilding		
Capri 16.5	1994	Catalina Design Team	Catalina Yachts		
Caprice 15	1968	Cuthbertson & Cassian	Canadian Sailcraft		
Catalina 16.5	1994	Catalina Design Team	Catalina Yachts		
CL 16	1967	Ian Proctor; Graham Dodd; George Blanchard	C&L Boatworks		
C-Lark	1964	Don Martin	Clark Boat Company		
C-Scow	1905				
Cherub	1951	John Spencer	Several		
Constellation 16	1963	Johann Tanzer	Tanzer Industries		
Comet (dinghy)	1922	C. Lowndes Johnson	Whitecap Composites		
Coronado 15	1968	Frank V. Butler	Catalina Yachts		
Designers Choice	1978	Sparkman & Stephens	Howmar Boats		
Dolphin 15 Senior	1964	Glenn and Murray Corcorran	Silverline Boats, Dolphin Sailboat Company		
Dovekie 21	1978	Phil Bolger	Edey & Duff		
El Toro (dinghy)	1939	Charles McGregor	Moore Sailboats; W. D. Schock Corp		
E Scow	1924	Arnold Meyer Sr	Johnson Boat Works; Melges Performance Sailboats		
Farr 3.7	1971	Bruce Farr	Homebuilt		
Firefly (dinghy)	1946	Uffa Fox	Fairey Marine; Rondar Raceboats; Whitecap Composites		
Flipper (US dinghy)	1966	Carter Pyle; Joe Quigg	Newport Boats; Mobjack Manufacturing		
Flipper (Danish dinghy)	1970	Peter Bruun	Intermark Sailcraft ApS		
Flying Eleven	1967				
Flying Ant	1950s				
Flying Scot (dinghy)	1958	Sandy Douglass	Tanzer Industries; Douglass & McLeod; Customflex; Loftland Sail-craft; Flying Scot, Inc.		
Force 5	1972	Fred Scott	AMF Alcort Weeks Yacht Yard		
Geary 18	1928	Ted Geary	Clark Boat Company		
Gloucester 15	1987	Rod Macalpine-Downie and Dick Gibbs	Gloucester Yachts		
Hampton One-Design	1934	Vincent Serio	Vincent Serio		
Holiday 20	1973	Harry R. Sindle	Newport Boats		
Houdini (sailboat)	2011	John Welsford	amateur builders		
Howmar 12	1983	Craig V. Walters	Howmar Boats		
Hunter 140	2003	Hunter Design Team	Hunter Marine		
Hunter 146	2003	Chuck Burns and Hunter Design Team	Hunter Marine		
Hunter 170	1999	Hunter Design Team	Hunter Marine		
Hunter Xcite	2003	Hunter Design Team	Hunter Marine		
Impulse (dinghy)	1975	Arthur Caldwell	Tim Wilson Yacht Design; Formula Sailcraft		
Interclub Dinghy	1946	Sparkman & Stephens	Zephyr Boat Company, Dodson Plastic Corp, O'Day Corp		
Interlake (dinghy)	1933	Francis Sweisguth	Customflex		
Jeanneau Metaf	1971		Jeanneau		
Jet 14	1952	Howard Siddons	Siddons & Sindle, Allen Boat Company		
Kite	1965	Carter Pyle	Newport Boats & Mobjack Manufacturing		
Kona 14	1971	Lyle Hess	Fiberform		
Leeward 16	1962	Luger Industries	Luger Industries		
Lehman 12	1953	Barney Lehman	PlastiGlass; W. D. Schock Corp		
Lido 14	1958	Barney Lehman; W. D. Schock	W. D. Schock Corp		
Manly graduate					
Manly junior					
Marlow-Hunter 18	2011	Glenn Henderson	Hunter Marine		
Menger Cat 15	2001	Bill and Andrew Menger	Menger Boatworks		
Metcalf (dinghy)	1960	Bill Lapworth	W. D. Schock Corp		
Mistral 16	1980		Canadian Yacht Builders		
Mobjack	1956	Roger Moorman	Newport Boats & Mobjack Manufacturing		
Montgomery 12	1972	Lyle Hess	Montgomery Marine Products		
MC Scow	1956	Melges & Johnson	Melges Performance Sailboats; Johnson Boat Works		
Melges 14	2016	Reichel/Pugh	Melges Performance Sailboats		
Melges 15	2020	Reichel/Pugh	Melges Performance Sailboats		
Melges 17	2006	Reichel/Pugh	Melges Performance Sailboats		
M Scow	1965	Johnson/Melges Boat Works	Tanzer Industries, Melges Performance Sailboats, Windward Boatworks		
Mud Hen 17	1981	Reuben Trane	Florida Bay Boat Company; Sovereign Yachts		
Northbridge senior	1960				
Overnighter 16	1964	Johann Tanzer	Tanzer Industries		
Paceship 20	1970	Cuthbertson & Cassian	Paceship Yachts		
P-class	1923	Harry Highet	Several		
Pelican	1950s				
Penguin (dinghy)	1939	Philip Rhodes	W. D. Schock Corp; Jack A. Helms Co. Ron Rawson, Inc. Customflex; Skaneateles Boat & Canoe Co.		
Phantom 14	1977	Jack Howie	Howmar Boats		
Picnic 17	1959	Nils Lucander	General Boats; Lofland Sail-craft		
Precision 13	1985	Stephen Seaton	Precision Boat Works		
Precision 14	1985	Stephen Seaton	Precision Boat Works		
Precision 15	1995	Jim Taylor	Precision Boat Works		
Precision 16	1985	Stephen Seaton	Precision Boat Works		
Precision 185 CB	2001	Jim Taylor	Precision Boat Works		
Puffer (dinghy)	1972	Fred Scott	American Machine and Foundry		
Ranger 16	1987	Gary Mull	Ranger Fiberglass Boats		
Rascal 14	1961	Ray Greene	Ray Greene & Company		
Rhodes 18	1948	Philip Rhodes	Cape Cod Shipbuilding		
RS Neo	2017	Paul Handley; RS Sailing	RS Sailing		
RS Quest	2015	Jo Richards	RS Sailing		
S2 5.5	1982	Don Wennersten	S2 Yachts		
Sabot	1939				date is for US Sabot; other variants
Sea Pearl 21	1982	Ron Johnson	Marine Concepts		
Shrimp (dinghy)	1972	Hubert Vandestadt and Fraser McGruer	Vandestadt and McGruer Limited		
Skimmer (dinghy)	1933	William F. Crosby	homebuilt boat		
Skipjack 15	1965	Harry R. Sindle and Carter Pyle	Lockley Newport Boats & New Design Sailboats		
Skunk 11	1969	Hubert Vandestadt	Vandestadt and McGruer Limited		
Speedball 14	1980	W. Chad Turner	Laguna Yachts		
Spindrift 13	1965	Hubert Vandestadt	Vandestadt and McGruer Limited		
Starling	1970	John Peet	MacKay Boats		
Surprise 15	1969	Harry R. Sindle	Lockley Newport Boats		
Tanzer 14	1970	Johann Tanzer	Tanzer Industries		
Tanzer 16	1963	Johann Tanzer	Tanzer Industries		
Tech Dinghy	1935	George Owen	Herreshoff Manufacturing, Beetle Boat Co., Paceship Yachts, Whitecap Composites		
Thistle (dinghy)	1945	Sandy Douglass	Douglass & McLeod; Clark Boat Company; W. D. Schock Corp; Northwest One Design; Great Midwest Yacht Company		
Tiwal 2	2018	Marion Excoffon	Tiwal SAS		
Tiwal 2L	2022	Marion Excoffon	Tiwal SAS		
Tiwal 2XL	2026	Marion Excoffon	Tiwal SAS		
Tiwal 3	2012	Marion Excoffon	Tiwal SAS	formerly Tiwal 3.2	
Tiwal 3R	2022	Marion Excoffon	Tiwal SAS		
Transit 380	2005	Jim Taylor	Precision Boat Works		
Twitchell 12	1991	Ron Holder	W. D. Schock Corp		
US1	1973	Ralph Kuppersmith & Clark Mills	Advance Sailboat Corp. & Continental Sailcraft		
US Sabot	1939	Charles McGregor	Catalina Yachts; W. D. Schock Corp		
Vanguard 15	1992	Bob Ames	Team Vanguard & LaserPerformance		
Waszp	2016	Andrew McDougall	McConaghy Boats		
Wayfarer	1957	Ian Proctor; Mk 4 Updates: Phil Morrison	Small Craft Ltd; Porter Brothers; Moores Of Wroxham; Hartley Boats		
Widgeon 12	1964	Robert H. Baker	O'Day Corp		
Windmill	1953	Clark Mills	Johannsen Boat Works; Lockley Newport Boats; Advance Sailboat Corp.		
Y Flyer	1938	Alvin Youngquist	Jack A. Helms Co. Jibetech; Turner Marine; Hinterhoeller Limited	Canada, US	

=== Multihulls ===
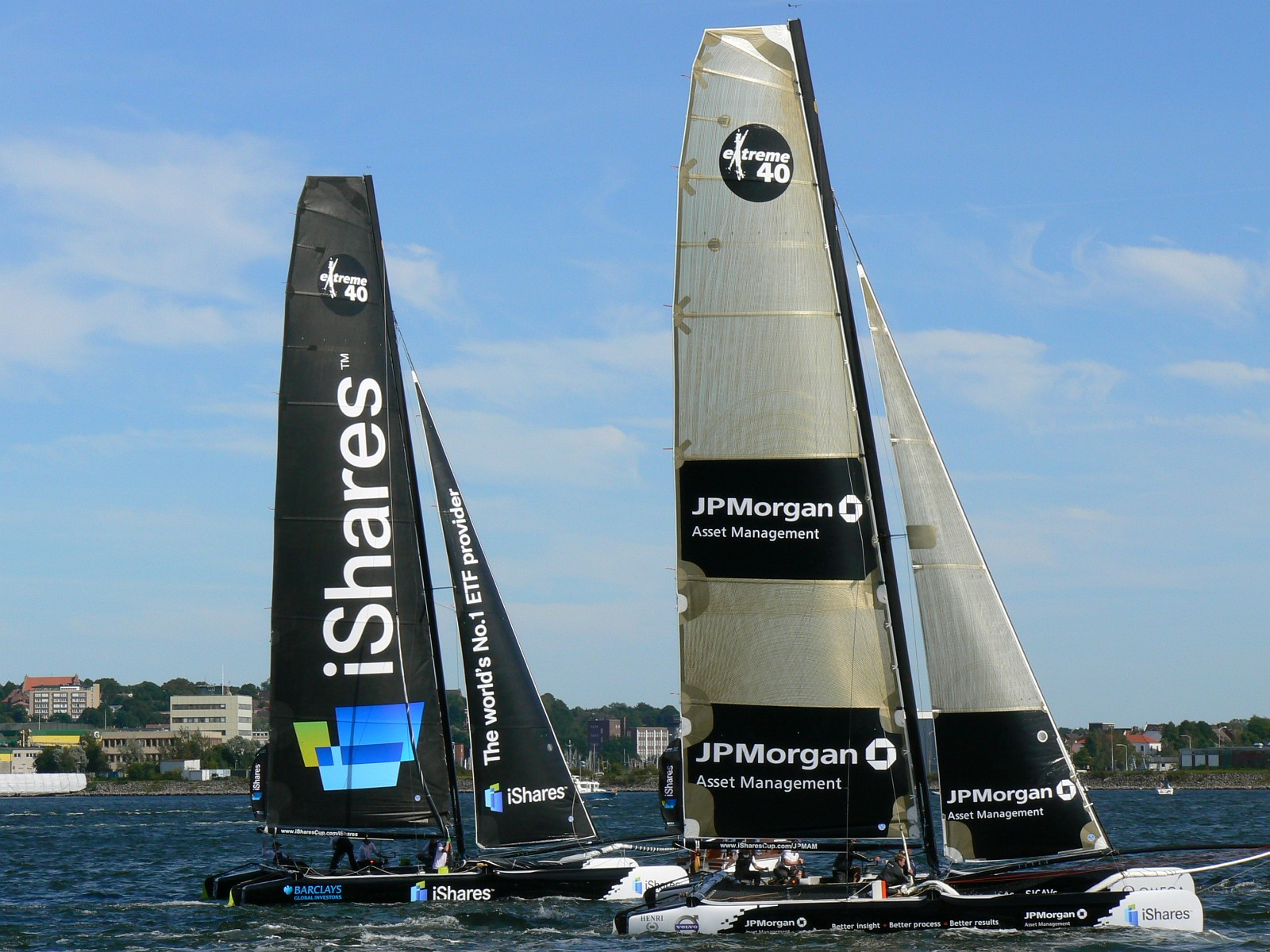
Extreme 40

Name	Year of first construction	Designer	Builder	Notes	Ref
AC45	2010	Oracle Racing	Core Builders		
AC50	2017	Development class			
AC72	2013	Development class			
Alegria 67	2018	Berret Racoupeau Yacht Design	Fountaine-Pajot		
Corsair 24 Mark II	1996	Ian Farrier	Corsair Marine		
Catalina Catamaran	1960	Seymour Paul	W. D. Schock Corp		
Corsair Cruze 970	2012	Corsair Design Team	Corsair Marine		
DC‐14 Phantom	1964	MacLear & Harris	Duncan Sutphen Inc.		
Diam 24	2014	VPLP	Vianney Ancelin		
Extreme 40	2005	Yves Loday	Marstrom Composite		
F-24 Sport Cruiser	1991	Ian Farrier	Corsair Marine		
F-27 Sport Cruiser	1986	Ian Farrier	Corsair Marine		
F-31 Sport Cruiser	1991	Ian Farrier	Corsair Marine		
Flying Phantom Elite	2015	Martin Fischer	Phantom International		
Flying Phantom Essentiel	2017	Gonzalo Redondo and Martin Fischer	Phantom International		
G-Cat 5.0	1976	Hans Geisler	G-Cat Multihulls		
G-Cat 5.7	1980	Hans Geisler	G-Cat Multihulls		
Hobie 14	1967	Hobie Alter	Hobie Cat		
Hobie Bravo	2001	Hobie Cat	Hobie Cat		
Hobie Getaway	2007	Hobie Cat	Hobie Cat		
Hobie Wave	1994	Morrelli & Melvin	Hobie Cat		
Isotope	1964	Frank Meldau	Fiberglass Unlimited		
Lagoon 35	1995	Morrelli and Melvin	Jeanneau; TPI Composites; Construction Navale Bordeaux; Lagoon Catamaran		
Lagoon 37	1995	Van Peteghem/Lauriot-Prevost	Jeanneau; TPI Composites; Construction Navale Bordeaux; Lagoon Catamaran		
Lagoon 39	2013	Van Peteghem/Lauriot-Prevost; Nauta Design	Lagoon Catamaran		
Lagoon 40	2017	Van Peteghem/Lauriot-Prevost; Patrick le Quément; Nauta Design	Lagoon Catamaran		
Lagoon 42	1990	Van Peteghem/Lauriot-Prevost	Jeanneau; TPI Composites; Construction Navale Bordeaux; Lagoon Catamaran		
Lagoon 42-2	2016	Van Peteghem/Lauriot-Prevost; Nauta Design	Lagoon Catamaran		
Lagoon 46	2019	Van Peteghem/Lauriot-Prevost; Patrick le Quément; Nauta Design	Lagoon Catamaran		
Lagoon 47	1992	Van Peteghem/Lauriot-Prevost	Jeanneau; Lagoon Catamaran		
Lagoon 50	2018	Van Peteghem/Lauriot-Prevost; Patrick le Quément; Nauta Design	Lagoon Catamaran		
Lagoon 51	2021	Van Peteghem/Lauriot-Prevost; Patrick le Quément; Nauta Design	Lagoon Catamaran		
Lagoon 52	2011	Van Peteghem/Lauriot-Prevost; Patrick le Quément; Nauta Design	Lagoon Catamaran		
Lagoon 55	2021	Van Peteghem/Lauriot-Prevost; Patrick le Quément; Nauta Design	Lagoon Catamaran		
Lagoon 65	2019	Van Peteghem/Lauriot-Prevost; Patrick le Quément; Nauta Design	Lagoon Catamaran		
Lagoon 77	2017	Van Peteghem/Lauriot-Prevost; Patrick le Quément; Nauta Design	Lagoon Catamaran		
Lagoon 380	1999	Van Peteghem/Lauriot-Prevost	Jeanneau; Construction Navale Bordeaux; Lagoon Catamaran		
Lagoon 400	2009	Van Peteghem/Lauriot-Prevost	Lagoon Catamaran		
Lagoon 410	1997	Van Peteghem/Lauriot-Prevost	Jeanneau; Construction Navale Bordeaux; Lagoon Catamaran		
Lagoon 420	2006	Van Peteghem/Lauriot-Prevost	Lagoon Catamaran		
Lagoon 440	2004	Van Peteghem/Lauriot-Prevost	Lagoon Catamaran		
Lagoon 450	2014	Van Peteghem/Lauriot-Prevost; Patrick le Quément; Nauta Design	Lagoon Catamaran		
Lagoon 470	1998	Van Peteghem/Lauriot-Prevost	Jeanneau; Construction Navale Bordeaux; Lagoon Catamaran		
Lagoon 500	2005	Van Peteghem/Lauriot-Prevost	Lagoon Catamaran		
Lagoon 560	2011	Van Peteghem/Lauriot-Prevost; Patrick le Quément; Nauta Design	Lagoon Catamaran		
Lagoon 570	2000	Van Peteghem/Lauriot-Prevost	Construction Navale Bordeaux; Lagoon Catamaran		
Lagoon 620	2009	Van Peteghem/Lauriot-Prevost; Patrick le Quément; Nauta Design	Lagoon Catamaran		
Maricat 4.3	1976				
Multi One Design (MOD70)	2009	VPLP Design Office	CDK Technologies (Fr): Project manager yard, assembly Decision (Sui): Boatyard, construction of the beams Multiplast (Fr): Boatyard, construction of the floats Lorima (Fr): Construction of the masts and booms		
Nacra 5.2	1975	Tom Roland	Nacra Sailing		
Phantom 14 (catamaran)	1995		Centro Nautico Adriatico		
Phantom 16 (catamaran)	1988		Centro Nautico Adriatico		
Phoenix 18	1964	Dick Gibbs; Rod Macalpine-Downie	Gibbs Boat Company; MFG Boat Company; Skene Boats		
Polynesian Concept	1970	Rudy Choy	W. D. Schock Corp		
Prindle 18	1977	Geoffrey Prindle	Surfglas; Prindle Catamarans; Lear Siegler Inc.		
Prindle 18-2	1983		Prindle Catamarans; Performance Catamarans		
Stiletto 27	1976	Bill Higgins and Don Ansley	Stiletto Catamarans		
Taipan 4.9	1982				
Taipan 5.7	1988				
Trac 14	1980	Richard & Jay McFarlane	AMF Corp		
Trac 16	1983	Steve Nichols	AMF Corp		
Ultim 32/23	2018	Development class			
Windrush 14	1976				

== See also ==
- Classic dinghy classes
- List of boat types
- List of historical ship types
- List of keelboat classes designed before 1970
- Olympic sailing classes
