= Tiwal =

Tiwal may refer to:

- Tiwal (company), French sailboat manufacturer
- Dabakan, Philippine drum
