= Dropstitch inflatable fabric =

Textile product

Dropstitch Inflatable Fabric (also known as double wall fabric, three-dimensional fabric, distance fabric, or drop stitch inflatable fabric) is a textile product composed of two layers of woven fabric connected by threads, referred to as drop yarns or drop stitch threads. When the fabric layers are coated with an airtight material, typically TPU or PVC, the structure becomes inflatable and capable of holding its shape under pressure. The inflated pockets created by the drop yarns provide the fabric with structural rigidity, enabling the creation of flat-sided, pressure-resistant structures.

== History ==
The origins of drop stitch technology can be traced back to the 1950s, when Goodyear developed a process similar to velvet manufacturing, initially calling it "Airmat". This technology was initially employed in the construction of inflatable airplanes. Early drop stitch fabrics faced limitations in thickness, reaching a maximum of approximately six inches. Creating specific shapes required cutting and sewing the fabric, a process that was expensive, time-consuming, and often resulted in inconsistent shapes. A significant advancement came with Earl Bilsky's patent in 1966, assigned to Goodyear Aerospace Corporation, which detailed a method for weaving contoured drop stitch inflatable fabric. This method involved extending the drop yarns to predetermined lengths during weaving, resulting in precise inflatable shapes without the need for cutting and sewing. While Bilsky's patent mentioned wire yarns, drop stitch can be manufactured using various materials, including nylon, rayon, and other natural or synthetic fibers. Dropstitch was used in the creation of gymnastic mats before its widespread use in standup paddleboards and inflatable dinghies.

== Manufacturing ==
The manufacturing of drop stitch fabric involves weaving two layers of fabric in parallel on specialized machines that use hundreds of needles, sometimes exceeding 400. These machines can produce drop stitch fabrics in widths ranging from 5 to 10 feet. Adjusting the spacing between the fabric layers during manufacturing is a complex and time-consuming process, often requiring up to 20 days to modify the needle setup. After the weaving process, an airtight coating, typically TPU or PVC, is applied to both surfaces of the fabric. Two common methods for joining drop stitch components are gluing and welding.
