= Pierce Arrow 18 =

1980s US recreational keelboat

Development
- Designer: Mark Leonard
- Location: United States
- Year: 1982
- Builders: Freedom Yachts; Preston Yachts
- Role: Cruiser
- Name: Pierce Arrow 18

Boat
- Displacement: 1,100 lb (499 kg)
- Draft: 4.00 ft (1.22 m) with daggerboard down

Hull
- Type: monohull
- Construction: fiberglass
- LOA: 18.58 ft (5.66 m)
- LWL: 16.67 ft (5.08 m)
- Beam: 8.00 ft (2.44 m)
- Engine: outboard motor

Hull appendages
- Keel: daggerboard
- Ballast: 400 lb (181 kg)
- Rudder: transom-mounted rudder

Rig
- Rig type: Bermuda rig

Sails
- Sailplan: fractional rigged sloop
- Total sail area: 185.00 sq ft (17.187 m^{2})

The Pierce Arrow 18, also called the Preston 19, is a sailboat that was designed by Mark Leonard as a pocket cruiser and first built in 1982.

== Production ==
The design was initially built by Freedom Yachts, of Rockford, Illinois, United States from 1982 until about 1984. This is not the same company as Freedom Yachts of Rhode Island.

The boat's designer, Mark Leonard, and his brother, Matthew Leonard, built the molds and tooling for the design in Machesney Park, Illinois. Matthew Leonard later purchased a set of parts from Mark Leonard and then built new molds for the design. He established a company, Preston Yachts, in Oak Creek, Wisconsin and built these boats under the name Preston 19, from 1987 until 1990.

== Design ==
The Pierce Arrow 18 is a recreational keelboat, built predominantly of fiberglass. It has a fractional sloop rig, a slightly raked stem, a plumb transom, a transom-hung rudder controlled by a tiller and a retractable daggerboard lifted by a winch. It displaces 1,100 lb (499 kg) and carries 400 lb (181 kg) of ballast.

The boat has a draft of 4.00 ft (1.22 m) with the daggerboard extended and 0.75 ft (0.23 m) with it retracted, allowing operation in shallow water, beaching or ground transportation on a trailer.

The boat is normally fitted with a small 3 to 6 hp (2 to 4 kW) outboard motor for docking and maneuvering.

The design has sleeping accommodation for five people, with a double "V"-berth in the bow cabin, a child-sized settee quarter berth in the main cabin and an aft cabin with a double berth on the starboard side. No galley provisions are fitted. The head is located on the port side of the companionway ladder. Cabin headroom is 58 in (147 cm).

The design has a hull speed of 5.5 kn (10.2 km/h).

== Reception ==
In a 2010 review Steve Henkel wrote, "the PA18 is unusual in several ways. For one thing, she weighs only 1,100 pounds, ready to sail. Also, with her wide beam, she has a bigger Space Index than any of her comp[etitor]s. For still another thing, she has a heavy (400 pound) daggerboard, which must be mechanically lifted by a winch into a trunk just aft of the mast. Best features: With an SA/D over 25 and thus in the "very high" range, and a D/L nearly in the ultralight category, this should be quite fast in light air. The only other boats in this size range with comparable SA/D and D/L ratios are the Picnic 17 and the Newport 17, but neither of these boats have anywhere near the PA18's 400 pounds of ballast. Worst features: Cranking that heavy daggerboard up and down must be a nuisance, and hitting a rock with the board down is likely to be a cause for alarm, if not of damage to the trunk and hull. We searched the Internet for any trace of information on this boat, or her designer or owners, and found none, R.I.P."
