= Beneteau First 14 =

Sailboat class

Development
- Designer: Samuel Manuard
- Location: France; Slovenia
- Year: 2017
- Builders: Seascape; Beneteau
- Role: Sailing dinghy
- Name: Beneteau First 14

Boat
- Crew: One or two
- Displacement: 243 lb (110 kg)
- Draft: 3.22 ft (0.98 m) with daggerboard down

Hull
- Type: monohull
- Construction: glassfibre
- LOA: 14.11 ft (4.30 m)
- Beam: 5.58 ft (1.70 m)

Hull appendages
- Keel: daggerboard
- Rudder: Transom-mounted rudder

Rig
- Rig type: Bermuda rig

Sails
- Sailplan: Fractional rigged sloop
- Mainsail area: 82.9 sq ft (7.70 m^{2})
- Jib/genoa area: 31.2 sq ft (2.90 m^{2})
- Gennaker area: 142.1 sq ft (13.20 m^{2})
- Upwind sail area: 114.1 sq ft (10.60 m^{2})
- Downwind sail area: 256.2 sq ft (23.80 m^{2})

The Beneteau First 14, originally the Seascape 14, is a French one design planing sailing dinghy that was designed by Samuel Manuard as a racer and first built in 2017.

== Production ==
The design was originally built by Seascape in Slovenia starting in 2017, as the Seascape 14. In 2018 Beneteau of France bought a controlling interest in Seascape and renamed the boat the First 14 SE, for Seascape Edition. A new model with the same hull design is called the First 14. As of 2023 both models remained in production.

== Design ==
The Beneteau 14 is a recreational and racing sailboat, built predominantly of a vacuum-infused vinylester glassfibre and foam sandwich for both the hull and the deck. It has a fractional sloop rig; with a roller furling, self-tacking jib; a deck-stepped mast; no spreaders and carbon fibre spars with continuous stainless steel 1X19 wire standing rigging. The hull has a reverse stem; an open, slightly reverse transom; a transom-hung rudder controlled by a tiller and a retractable daggerboard that has two trunks, fore and aft.

The provision of two dagger board trunk slots allows balancing the boat for single handed sailing in catboat configuration or double handed sailing as a sloop. The boat is sailed with one or two sailors and is not fitted with a trapeze.

The boat has a draft of 3.22 ft (0.98 m) with the daggerboard extended and 0.36 ft (0.11 m) with it retracted, allowing operation in shallow water, beaching or ground transportation on a trailer or automobile roof rack.

For reaching and sailing downwind the design may be equipped with a gennaker of 142.1 sq ft (13.20 m^{2}) flown from a retractable bowsprit. Both the gennaker and bowspit are launched and recovered with a single line.

The boat comes with wheels that may be installed on the hull for launching and then stowed at the transom for sailing. A separate launch dolly is a factory option.

== Variants ==
First 14 SE (Seascape 14)
This model was first built by Seascape and introduced in 2017. It was initially called the Seascape 14, then the First 14 until 2021 when it became the First 14 SE. It has carbon fibre spars, a length overall of 14.11 ft (4.3 m) and displaces 148.00 lb (67 kg). It has greater sail area than the later Beneteau 14 model.
First 14
This model was first built by Beneteau and introduced in 2021. It has an aluminium rig and carbon fibre bowsprit, a length overall of 14.11 ft (4.3 m) and displaces 243 lb (110 kg), with a 158.73 lb (72 kg)hull weight.

== Operational history ==
The design was named Boat of the Year: Best Dinghy in 2019 by Sailing World and Best Daysailer for 2019 by Sail Magazine.

In its 2019 "Best Boats" review, Sail Magazine described the boat as a versatile design intended to accommodate sailors of varying skill levels. The review highlighted its twin daggerboard-slot configuration, which allows the boat to be sailed with different rig setups, ranging from mainsail-only operation for training purposes to a sloop rig with a furling jib and asymmetric spinnaker for higher performance sailing.

In a 2019 review, Yacht Hub reported, "the new Beneteau First 14 is a fast, robust sailing yacht. Beneteau yacht designers have focused on design and ergonomics, and this dinghy is an ideal introduction to sailing and the joy of surfing. The First 14's planing hull strives to achieve the best compromise between speed and stability. The dinghy's double centreboard casing means that she can be sailed solo (centreboard further aft and cat rig) or two-up (centreboard further forward and with a set of three sails). "

== See also ==
- List of sailing boat types
