= Hunter 170 =

Sailboat class

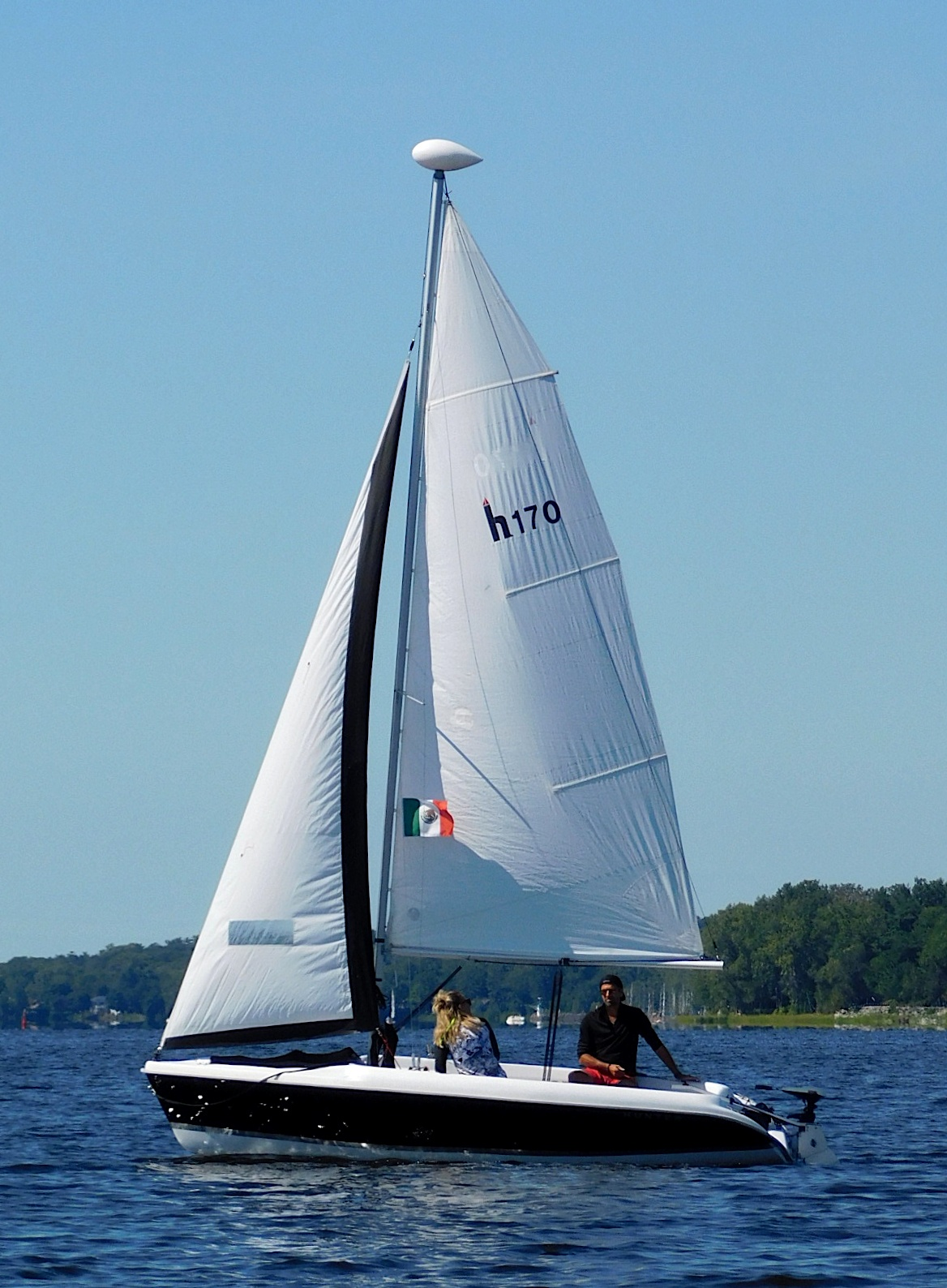

Development
- Designer: Hunter Design Team
- Location: United States
- Year: 1999
- Builder: Hunter Marine
- Name: Hunter 170

Boat
- Crew: six (maximum)
- Displacement: 478 lb (217 kg)
- Draft: 4.49 ft (1.37 m) with centreboard down

Hull
- Type: Monohull
- Construction: ACP
- LOA: 17.08 ft (5.21 m)
- LWL: 12.08 ft (3.68 m)
- Beam: 7.00 ft (2.13 m)

Hull appendages
- Keel: centerboard
- Ballast: none
- Rudder: transom-mounted rudder

Rig
- Rig type: Bermuda rig
- I foretriangle height: 18.95 ft (5.78 m)
- J foretriangle base: 5.54 ft (1.69 m)
- P mainsail luff: 19.42 ft (5.92 m)
- E mainsail foot: 8.37 ft (2.55 m)

Sails
- Sailplan: Fractional rigged sloop
- Mainsail area: 81.27 sq ft (7.550 m^{2})
- Jib/genoa area: 52.49 sq ft (4.876 m^{2})
- Total sail area: 133.76 sq ft (12.427 m^{2})

The Hunter 170 is an American sailing dinghy that was designed the Hunter Design Team and first built in 1999.

== Production ==
The design was built by Hunter Marine in the United States, starting in 1999 but is now out of production.

The design was replaced in production by the slightly larger Marlow-Hunter 18, which was introduced in 2011.

== Design ==
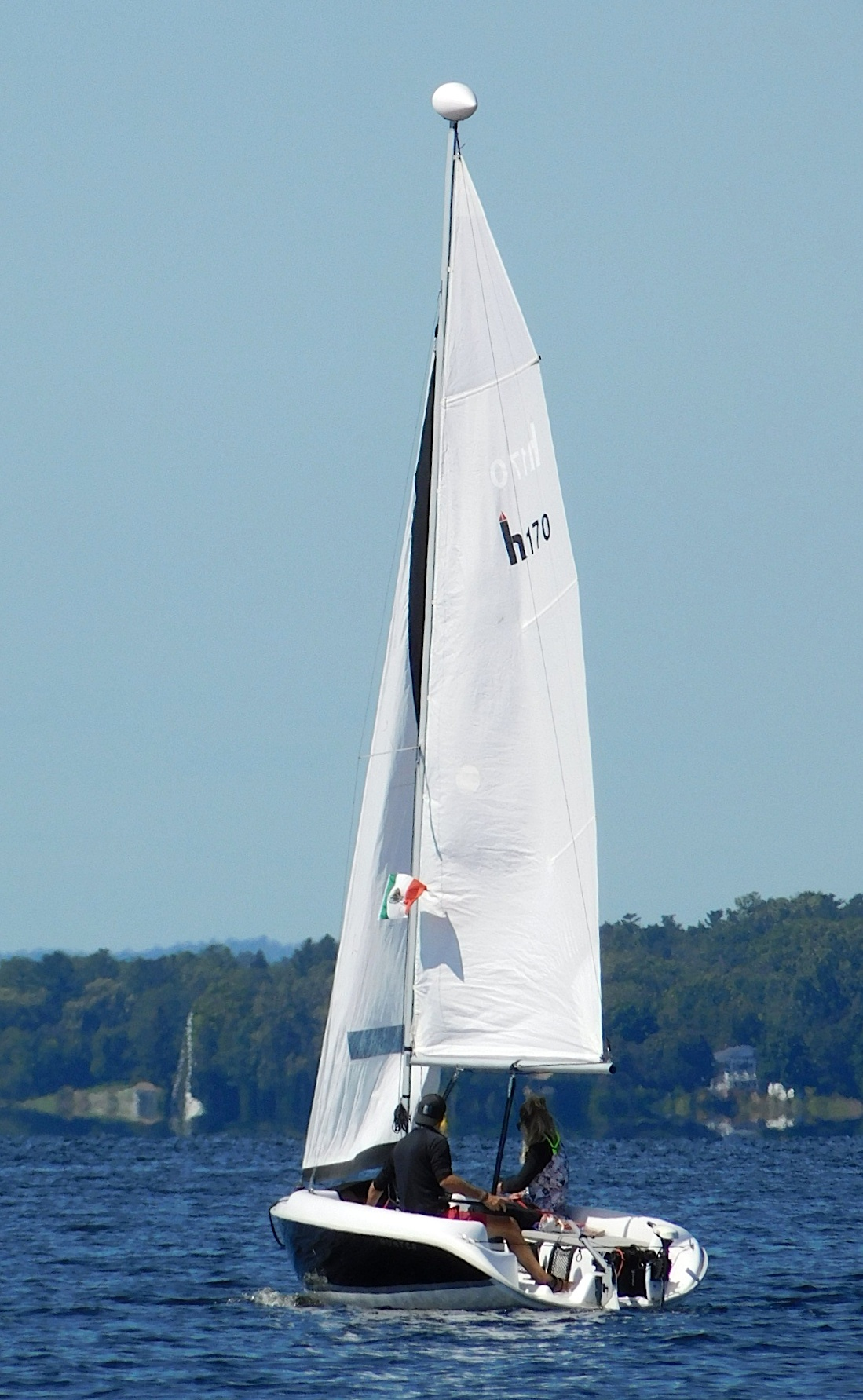
a Hunter 170, showing the open transom design

The Hunter 170 is a small, unsinkable, recreational dinghy, built predominantly of ACP. It has a fractional sloop rig, a raked stem, an open reverse transom, a transom-hung rudder controlled by a tiller and a retractable centerboard.

The boat displaces 478 lb (217 kg), has 1,500 lb (680 kg) of built-in positive flotation and can accommodate up to six people.

The boat has a draft of 4.49 ft (1.37 m) with the centreboard extended and 0.49 ft (0.15 m) with it retracted, allowing beaching or ground transportation on a trailer.

The boat may be fitted with a small outboard motor for docking and maneuvering and a 2.5 hp (2 kW) motor was a factory option. Other factory options included a 202 sq ft (18.8 m^{2}) asymmetrical spinnaker, a road trailer and a launching dolly.

The design has a hull speed of 4.66 kn (8.63 km/h).

== See also ==
- List of sailing boat types

Related development

- Hunter 146
- Marlow-Hunter 18

Similar sailboats

- Laser 2
