= Jeanneau Metaf =

Sailboat class

Development
- Location: France
- Year: 1972
- Builder: Jeanneau
- Role: Cruising sailing dinghy
- Name: Jeanneau Metaf

Boat
- Displacement: 430 lb (195 kg)
- Draft: 3.28 ft (1.00 m) with centerboard down

Hull
- Type: monohull
- Construction: fiberglass
- LOA: 13.12 ft (4.00 m)
- Beam: 5.25 ft (1.60 m)

Hull appendages
- Keel: centerboard
- Rudder: transom-mounted rudder

Rig
- Rig type: Bermuda rig

Sails
- Sailplan: fractional rigged sloop
- Total sail area: 86.00 sq ft (7.990 m^{2})

The Jeanneau Metaf is a French sailing dinghy that was designed as a day sailer and cruiser and first built in 1972.

== Production ==
The design was built by Jeanneau in France in the United States, starting in 1972, but it is now out of production.

== Design ==
The Metaf is a recreational sailboat, built predominantly of fiberglass, with wood trim. It has a fractional sloop rig, with a keel-stepped mast and aluminum spars with stainless steel wire rigging. The hull has a raked stem, a slightly angled transom, a transom-hung rudder controlled by a tiller and a retractable centerboard. It displaces 430 lb (195 kg).

The boat has a draft of 3.28 ft (1.00 m) with the centerboard extended and 0.82 ft (0.25 m) with it retracted, allowing operation in shallow water, beaching or ground transportation on a trailer.

The design has sleeping accommodation for two people, with a double "V"-berth in the cabin. The cabin's headroom is 42.5 in (108 cm).

== See also ==
- List of sailing boat types
