= Hunter 146 =

Sailboat class

Development
- Designer: Chuck Burns and the Hunter Design Team
- Location: United States
- Year: 2003
- Builder: Hunter Marine
- Name: Hunter 146

Boat
- Crew: four (maximum)
- Displacement: 340 lb (154 kg)
- Draft: 3.00 ft (0.91 m) with centreboard down

Hull
- Type: Monohull
- Construction: ACP
- LOA: 14.50 ft (4.42 m)
- Beam: 6.50 ft (1.98 m)

Hull appendages
- Keel: centerboard
- Ballast: none
- Rudder: transom-mounted rudder

Rig
- Rig type: Bermuda rig
- I foretriangle height: 12.00 ft (3.66 m)
- J foretriangle base: 4.58 ft (1.40 m)
- P mainsail luff: 16.58 ft (5.05 m)
- E mainsail foot: 7.83 ft (2.39 m)

Sails
- Sailplan: Fractional rigged sloop
- Mainsail area: 64.91 sq ft (6.030 m^{2})
- Jib/genoa area: 27.48 sq ft (2.553 m^{2})
- Total sail area: 92.39 sq ft (8.583 m^{2})

The Hunter 146 is an American sailing dinghy that was designed by Chuck Burns and the Hunter Design Team as a novice sailboat and first built in 2003.

The design was renamed the Hunter 15 in 2008 and is now referred to as the Marlow-Hunter 15.

== Production ==
The design has been built by Hunter Marine in the United States, starting in 2003 and remains in production under the designation Marlow-Hunter 15.

== Design ==
The Hunter 146 is a small recreational dinghy, built predominantly of ACP. It has a fractional sloop rig, a raked stem, an open reverse transom, a transom-hung rudder controlled by a tiller and a retractable centerboard. It displaces 340 lb (154 kg) and can accommodate up to four people.

The boat has a draft of 3.00 ft (0.91 m) with the centreboard extended and 0.50 ft (0.15 m) with it retracted, allowing beaching or ground transportation on a trailer.

== See also ==
- List of sailing boat types

Related development

- Hunter 140
- Hunter 170
- Marlow-Hunter 18

Similar sailboats

- Laser 2
