= Hunter 140 =

Sailboat class

Development
- Designer: Hunter Design Team
- Location: United States
- Year: 2003
- Builder: Hunter Marine
- Name: Hunter 140

Boat
- Displacement: 225 lb (102 kg)
- Draft: 3.00 ft (0.91 m)

Hull
- Type: Monohull
- Construction: ACP
- LOA: 14.00 ft (4.27 m)
- Beam: 5.83 ft (1.78 m)
- Engine: optional 2.5 hp (2 kW) Outboard motor

Hull appendages
- Keel: centerboard
- Ballast: none
- Rudder: transom-mounted rudder

Rig
- Rig type: Bermuda rig

Sails
- Sailplan: Fractional rigged sloop
- Total sail area: 102 sq ft (9.5 m^{2})

The Hunter 140 is an American dinghy that was designed by the Hunter Design Team as a sailing trainer and first built in 2003.

== Production ==
The design was built by Hunter Marine in the United States starting in 2003, but it is now out of production.

== Design ==
The Hunter 140 is an unsinkable sailing dinghy, built of ACP, thermoformed and UV protected plastic, with a fiberglass mat and injected foam construction, making it unsinkable. It has a fractional sloop rig, an aluminum mast and boom with stainless steel standing rigging, a raked stem, a vertical transom, a transom-hung rudder controlled by a tiller and a retractable centerboard. It displaces 225 lb (102 kg) and can accommodate three occupants.

The boat has a draft of 3.00 ft (0.91 m) with the centreboard extended and 0.50 ft (0.15 m) with it retracted, allowing beaching or ground transportation on a trailer.

Factory options included a roller furling jib, a launching dolly, a road trailer, a motor mount and a 2.5 hp (2 kW) outboard motor for docking and maneuvering.

== See also ==
- List of sailing boat types

Related design

- Hunter 146

Similar sailboats

- Laser 2
