= Marlow-Hunter 18 =

Sailboat class

Development
- Designer: Glenn Henderson
- Location: United States
- Year: 2011
- Builder: Hunter Marine
- Name: Marlow-Hunter 18

Boat
- Crew: 4
- Displacement: 836 lb (379 kg)
- Draft: 52 in (1.32 m)

Hull
- Type: Monohull
- Construction: Fiberglass
- LOA: 18.33 ft (5.59 m)
- LWL: 16.50 ft (5.03 m)
- Beam: 7.17 ft (2.19 m)
- Engine: none

Hull appendages
- Keel: centerboard
- Rudder: transom-mounted rudder

Rig
- Rig type: Bermuda rig

Sails
- Sailplan: Fractional sloop
- Total sail area: 170 sq ft (16 m^{2})

The Marlow-Hunter 18 is an American sailing dinghy that was designed by Glenn Henderson as a day sailer and first built in 2011.

The Marlow-Hunter 18 replaced the similar Hunter 170 in production.

The design was originally marketed by the manufacturer in 2011 as the Hunter 18, but, emerging from bankruptcy, the company became Marlow-Hunter in 2012 and the design was re-designated as the Marlow-Hunter 18.

== Production ==
The design was built by Hunter Marine and later Marlow-Hunter in the United States, starting in 2011 and remained in production through 2019.

== Design ==
The Marlow-Hunter 18 differs from the Hunter 170 in that it has more length and more waterline length, a higher length to beam ratio and more sail area.

The Marlow-Hunter 18 is a small recreational dinghy, built predominantly of fiberglass, with a balsa-cored deck and hull. The hull has a hard chine and a bow hollow. It has a cuddy space covered with a snap-fastener canvas cover for stowage. It has a fractional sloop rig, a plumb stem, an open reverse transom, a transom-hung swing-up rudder controlled by a tiller with an extension and a folding centerboard keel. It displaces 836 lb (379 kg) empty and can carry four people to a maximum of 936 lb (425 kg).

The boat has a draft of 52 in (130 cm) with the centerboard extended and 6 in (15 cm) with it retracted, allowing beaching or ground transportation on a trailer. The boat has no provisions for mounting a motor.

Factory standard equipment includes a jib and a loose-footed mainsail. Factory options include a gennaker.

== Operational history ==
Writing for Sailing magazine in July 2011, famed yacht designer Robert Perry concluded at the 18, "I think this would be an ideal boat to use to teach kids how to sail. It has the look of a modern sport boat with its plumb stem and open transom. With the spinnaker option you should be able to get good performance out of the boat and kids can learn the full range of basic sailing skills in a boat that won't overpower them."

In a review for Sail magazine also in July 2011, writer Charles Doane sailed the boat with Steve Pettengill, "who serves as Hunter’s unofficial Director of Destructive Testing". They sailed the boat in winds of over 20 kn (37 km/h) with full sail and even the gennaker. Doane noted, "Though over-canvassed, the boat handled very well. Steering was precise, and we had no trouble keeping upright by playing the main when sailing on the wind. The controls are simple, effective and easy to handle. The high boom makes it unnecessary to duck when tacking, and a substantial centerline toerail and comfortably curved cockpit coaming make it easy to push your body out quickly to windward when heeling. The only thing lacking is a centerline hiking strap to hook your feet under, but this would be easy to retrofit." After the sail he concluded, "I feel I can recommend this boat highly. Handled by sane people, it would be lots of fun to just knock around in. Obviously, it’s a blast to sail in the heavy stuff as well."

== See also ==
- List of sailing boat types

Related development

- Hunter 146
- Hunter 170
