= Topaz Vibe =

Sailboat class

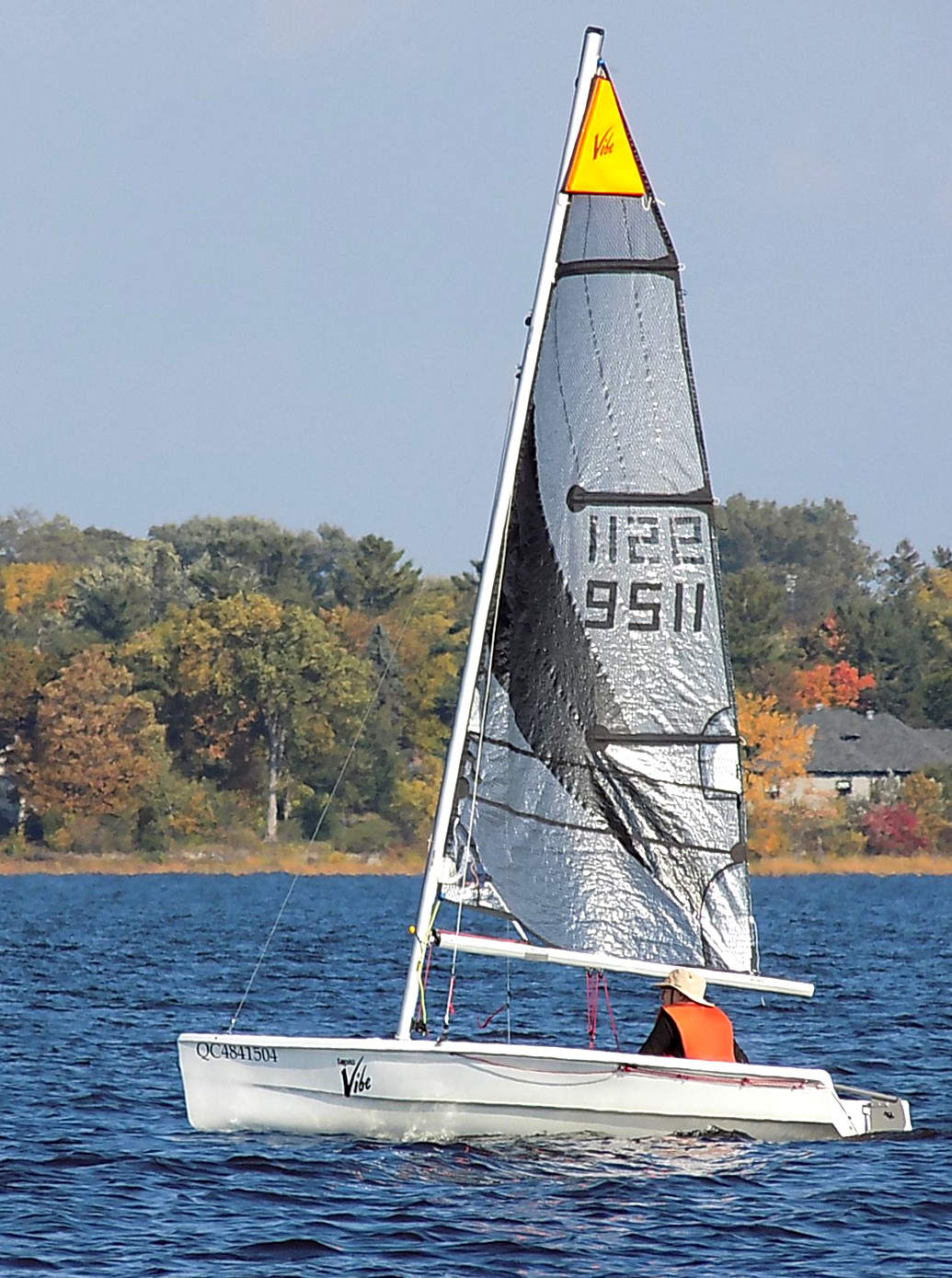

Development
- Designer: Ian Howlett & Rob White
- Year: 2006
- Builder: Topper International
- Name: Topaz Vibe

Boat
- Crew: 1–3
- Trapeze: Yes

Hull
- Type: Monohull
- Construction: Topaz TRILAM
- Hull weight: 70 kg (150 lb)
- LOA: 3.80 m (12 ft 6 in)
- Beam: 1.66 m (5 ft 5 in)

Hull appendages
- Keel: Centreboard

Sails
- Mainsail area: 6.90 m^{2} (74.3 sq ft); 8.12 m^{2} (87.4 sq ft)
- Jib/genoa area: 2.21 m^{2} (23.8 sq ft); 2.30 m^{2} (24.8 sq ft)
- Spinnaker area: 8.41 m^{2} (90.5 sq ft); 10.58 m^{2} (113.9 sq ft)

Racing
- RYA PN: 1185/1140

The Topaz Vibe is a British sailing dinghy designed by Ian Howlett and Rob White. Built by Topper International, it was introduced in 2006. There are two models, the Vibe and the Vibe X, with the latter carrying larger sails. The Vibe is a World Sailing Learn to Sail class.

== Design ==
The Vibe is a small recreational dinghy, with the hull built predominantly of trilam polyethylene. It has a fractional sloop rig, a raked stem, an open reverse transom, a transom-hung rudder controlled by a tiller and a retractable daggerboard keel. It displaces 154 lb (70 kg).

The Vibe has a beamy and chined hull and was designed as a performance hiking dinghy, though can be fitted with a single trapeze.

== Variants ==
Vibe
Base model with 98 sq ft (9.1 m^{2}) of sail area, plus a gennaker.
Vibe X
Model with larger sail area and larger gennaker.

== See also ==
- List of sailing boat types
