= Trac 14 =

Sailboat class

Development
- Designer: Richard McFarlane; Jay McFarlane
- Location: United States
- Year: 1980
- No. built: 1500
- Builder: AMF Alcort division of AMF Corp
- Role: Sailing dinghy
- Name: Trac 14

Boat
- Displacement: 195 lb (88 kg)
- Draft: 0.60 ft (0.18 m)

Hull
- Type: Catamaran
- Construction: Fiberglass
- LOA: 14.08 ft (4.29 m)
- Beam: 7.50 ft (2.29 m)

Hull appendages
- Keel: none
- Rudder: dual transom-mounted rudders

Rig
- Rig type: Bermuda rig

Sails
- Sailplan: Fractional rigged sloop
- Mainsail area: 119 sq ft (11.1 m^{2})
- Jib/genoa area: 29 sq ft (2.7 m^{2})
- Total sail area: 148.00 sq ft (13.750 m^{2})

Racing
- D-PN: 83.5

The Trac 14 is an American catamaran sailing dinghy that was designed by Australians Richard McFarlane and Jay McFarlane as a one-design racer and first built in 1980.

The design is a licensed version of the 1976 Windrush 14, which was originally known as the Surfcat and built by Windrush Catamarans of Australia. The Trac 14 is 25 lb (11 kg) heavier than the Windrush 14.

== Production ==
The Trac 14 design was built under license from Windrush Catamarans by the AMF Alcort division of AMF, Inc. in the United States. The company commenced production in 1980 and produced 1500 by the time it went out of business in 2012.

== Design ==
The Trac 14 is a recreational sailboat, built predominantly of fiberglass. It has a fractional sloop rig with hard-coated aluminum spars. The mainsail has seven full sail battens. The dual hulls have spooned raked stems, plumb transoms, dual transom-hung rudders controlled by a tiller, equipped with a hiking extension. The boat displaces 195 lb (88 kg).

The boat has a draft of 0.60 ft (0.18 m). The hulls have no keels and instead rely on their curved shape to reduce leeway. This hull arrangement allows easy beaching. The hulls fold under the trampoline to reduce the beam to 6.25 ft (1.91 m) for ground transportation on a trailer.

For sailing the design is equipped with a three-part downhaul and a roller furling jib. There is no trapeze, but the mast rake is adjustable while sailing.

The design has a Portsmouth Yardstick racing average handicap of 83.5 and is normally raced with a crew of two sailors.

== See also ==
- List of sailing boat types
- List of multihulls

Related development

- Trac 16
