= Hobie 14 =

Sailboat class

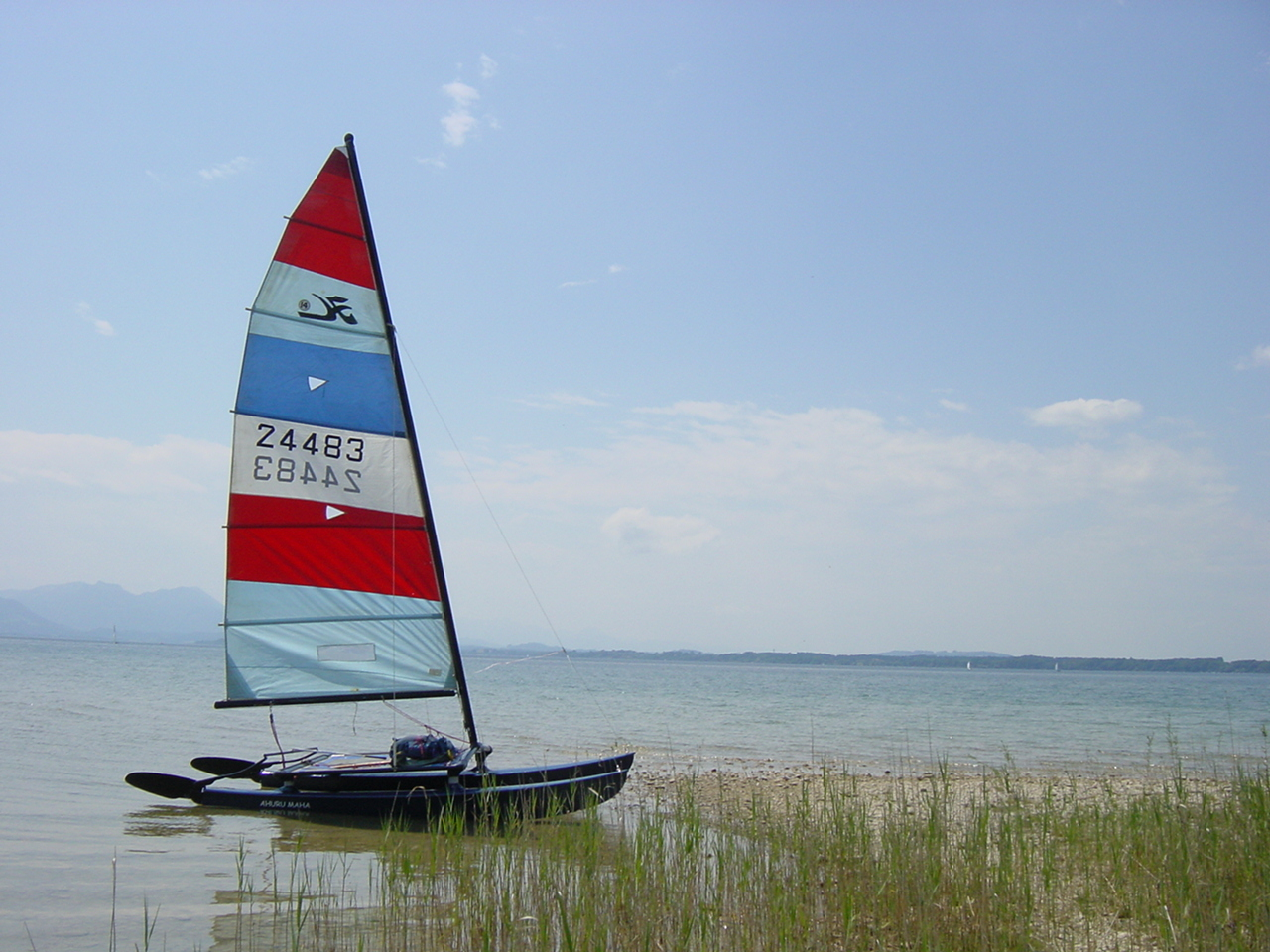

Development
- Designer: Hobie Alter
- Location: United States
- Year: 1967
- Builder: Hobie Cat
- Role: Sailing dinghy
- Name: Hobie 14

Boat
- Displacement: 240 lb (109 kg)
- Draft: 8 in (20 cm)

Hull
- Type: Catamaran
- Construction: Fiberglass
- LOA: 14.00 ft (4.27 m)
- Beam: 7.67 ft (2.34 m)

Hull appendages
- Keel: none
- Rudder: transom-mounted rudders

Rig
- Rig type: Bermuda rig or cat rig

Sails
- Sailplan: Fractional rigged sloop
- Mainsail area: 118.00 sq ft (10.963 m^{2})
- Jib/genoa area: 30.00 sq ft (2.787 m^{2})
- Total sail area: 148.00 sq ft (13.750 m^{2})

The Hobie 14 is an American catamaran sailing dinghy that was designed by Hobie Alter and first built in 1967.

The design was developed into the Hobie 16 in 1971.

== Production ==
The Hobie 14 was the initial design produced by Hobie Cat and led to a large family of similar boats that have been produced in numbers exceeding 200,000.

The design was built by Hobie Cat in the United States from 1967 until 2004 and in Europe until the late 2000s, but it is now out of production.

== Design ==
The Hobie 14 is a recreational sailboat, built predominantly of fiberglass over a foam core. In its base model it has a fully battened catboat rig with a rotating mast and aluminum spars. A jib can be added to make it a fractional sloop rig and a trapeze is optional. The asymmetrical hulls have spooned raked stems, vertical transoms and dual transom-hung rudders controlled by a tiller. The design has an elevated trampoline for the crew. The boat has no keels, relying on the curved shape of the hulls below the waterline to prevent leeway when sailing to windward. The design displaces 240 lb (109 kg).

The boat has a draft of 8 in (20 cm) and was designed to be sailed from a beach. It can be transported on a trailer.

The design has a Portsmouth Yardstick racing average handicap of 86.4 and is raced with a crew of one or two sailors.

== Variants ==
Hobie 14
Model with a single sail catboat rig.
Hobie 14 Turbo
Model with a mainsail and jib, fractional sloop rig. A trapeze is optional

== Operational history ==
The Hobie 14 is a World Sailing competition class.

In a 1994 review Richard Sherwood wrote, "The Hobie 16 and 18 ... are faster and perhaps more popular, but the Hobie 14 was the first ... This very fast boat has been clocked at over 24 mph ... Hobies are, with Sunfish, found at resorts all over the world. There are racing fleets to match. There are regional area, national, and world championships."

== See also ==
- List of sailing boat types
- List of multihulls

Related development

- Hobie 16
