= Flying Phantom Essentiel =

Sailboat class

Development
- Designer: Gonzalo Redondo and Martin Fischer
- Location: France
- Year: 2015
- Builder: Phantom International
- Role: Sailing dinghy
- Name: Flying Phantom Essentiel

Boat
- Displacement: 375 lb (170 kg)

Hull
- Type: Catamaran
- Construction: epoxy/glass sandwich
- LOA: 18.04 ft (5.50 m)
- Beam: 8.37 ft (2.55 m)

Hull appendages
- Keel: retractable hydrofoils
- Rudder: transom-mounted rudders

Rig
- Rig type: Bermuda rig

Sails
- Sailplan: Fractional rigged sloop
- Mainsail area: 182.99 sq ft (17.000 m^{2})
- Jib/genoa area: 53.82 sq ft (5.000 m^{2})
- Gennaker area: 215.28 sq ft (20.000 m^{2})
- Total sail area: 236.00 sq ft (21.925 m^{2})

The Flying Phantom Essentiel, (English: Essential), is a French hydrofoil catamaran sailing dinghy that was designed by Gonzalo Redondo and Martin Fischer and first built in 2017.

The Flying Phantom Essentiel is intended as an easier-to-sail hydrofoil for beginners than the Flying Phantom Elite. The company described the design goals as "an 18' all around boat easy to use, able to foil in a wide range of conditions and attract new people to foiling. This foil configuration makes the boat to be more user friendly and less physically demanding for the crew."

== Production ==
The design was built by Phantom International in Dinard, France starting 2017, but the company ceased operations that same year and it is now out of production.

== Design ==
The Flying Phantom Essentiel is a racing sailboat, built predominantly of an epoxy/glass sandwich. It has a fractional sloop rig, with an aluminum mast. The hulls have reverse-raked stems, vertical transoms, transom-hung rudders controlled by a tiller and retractable hydrofoils. It displaces 375 lb (170 kg).

The dual rudders are L-shaped, while the dual hydrofoil daggerboards are L-shaped. All are made from pre-preg, autoclave-cured carbon fibre.

The boat's mainsail and jib are made from polyester laminate, while the gennaker is polyester.

== See also ==
- List of sailing boat types
- List of multihulls

Related development

- Flying Phantom Elite
