= Trac 16 =

Sailboat class

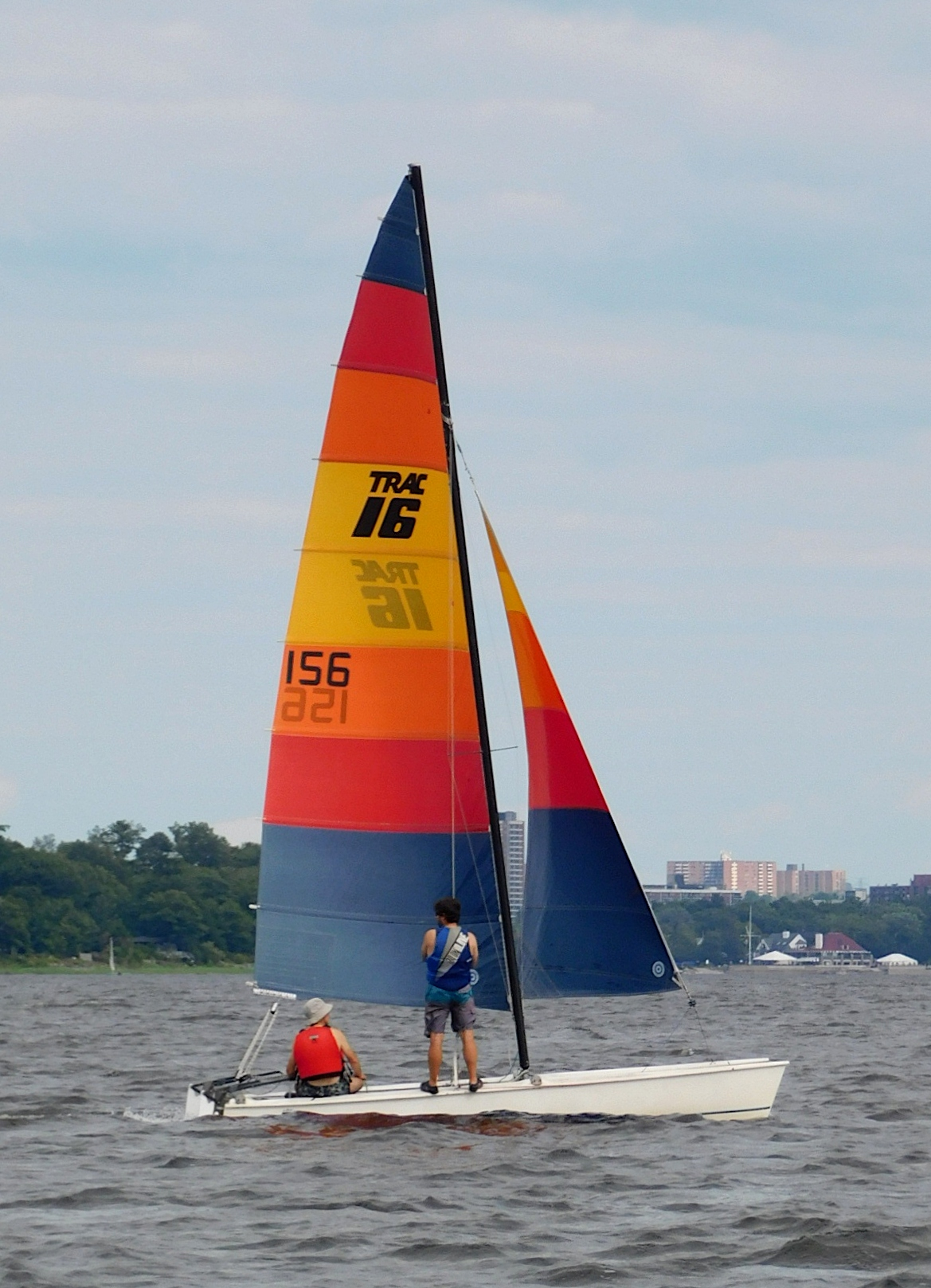
- TRAC 16

Development
- Designer: Steve Nichols
- Location: United States
- Year: 1983
- No. built: 600
- Builder: AMF Alcort
- Role: Sailing dinghy
- Name: Trac 16

Boat
- Displacement: 359 lb (163 kg)
- Draft: 9 in (23 cm)

Hull
- Type: catamaran
- Construction: fiberglass
- LOA: 16.42 ft (5.00 m)
- LWL: 15.92 ft (4.85 m)
- Beam: 8.00 ft (2.44 m)

Hull appendages
- Keel: none
- Rudder: twin transom-mounted rudders

Rig
- Rig type: Bermuda rig

Sails
- Sailplan: fractional rigged sloop
- Total sail area: 194.00 sq ft (18.023 m^{2})

The Trac 16 (sometimes styled as the TRAC-16 or Trac-16) is an American catamaran sailboat that was designed by Steve Nichols as a day sailer and first built in 1983.

== Production ==
The design was built in the United States by the AMF Alcort division of American Machine and Foundry, starting in 1983. A total of 600 boats were completed, but it is now out of production.

== Design ==
The Trac 16 is a recreational sailing dinghy, with a fractional sloop rig and its hulls built of fiberglass. The hulls have raked stems and plumb transoms with dual transom-hung rudders controlled by a tiller. The boat displaces 359 lb (163 kg).

The boat has no keels, but the hulls are asymmetrical and the "banana" shape provides some counter to leeway when sailing upwind. The boat has a draft of 9 in (23 cm), allowing operation in shallow water, beaching or ground transportation on a trailer.

The design has a hull speed of 5.35 kn (9.91 km/h).

== See also ==
- List of multihulls
- List of sailing boat types

Related development

- Trac 14

Similar sailboats

- Hobie 16
