= Barnett 1400 =

Sailboat class

Development
- Designer: Ron Hedlund and Gerry Hedlund
- Location: United States
- Year: 1989
- No. built: 1,000
- Builders: Barnett Boats; Windward Boatworks
- Role: One-design racer
- Name: Barnett 1400

Boat
- Displacement: 140 lb (64 kg)
- Draft: 1.33 ft (0.41 m) with the daggerboard down

Hull
- Type: Monohull
- Construction: Fiberglass
- LOA: 13.83 ft (4.22 m)
- Beam: 4.42 ft (1.35 m)

Hull appendages
- Keel: daggerboard
- Rudder: transom-mounted rudder

Rig
- Rig type: Catboat rig

Sails
- Sailplan: Catboat
- Mainsail area: 75.00 sq ft (6.968 m^{2})
- Total sail area: 75.00 sq ft (6.968 m^{2})

Racing
- D-PN: 96.0 (suspect)

The Barnett 1400 is an American sailing dinghy that was designed by Ron Hedlund and Gerry Hedlund as a one-design racer and first built in 1989.

== Production ==
The design was first built in 1989 by Barnett Boats in the United States in Libertyville, Illinois, then Kenosha, Wisconsin and later Green Lake, Wisconsin. When Barnett Boats went out of business in 2007 the company assets were acquired by Windward Boatworks of Middleton, Wisconsin and production continued. A total of 1,000 boats have been produced and the design remains in production.

== Design ==
The Barnett 1400's design goals were that it would be an "easy to sail, and fast to rig sailboat with comfort and speed in mind".

The Barnett 1400 is a recreational sailboat, built predominantly of fiberglass, with positive internal flotation and a wide beam. It has an unstayed catboat rig with a loose-footed sail, raised via a halyard and anodized aluminum spars. The hull design features a raked stem, a vertical transom, a transom-hung, kick-up rudder controlled by a tiller and a retractable daggerboard. It displaces 140 lb (64 kg).

The boat has a draft of 1.33 ft (0.41 m) with the daggerboard extended and 0.40 ft (0.12 m) with it retracted, allowing beaching or ground transportation on a trailer or car roof rack.

For sailing the design is equipped with a 3:1 mechanical advantage boom vang. The mainsheet is led to the daggerboard trunk.

The design has a Portsmouth Yardstick racing average handicap of 96.0 (suspect). The boat can carry three people, but is normally raced by one sailor.

== Operational history ==
In a 1994 review Richard Sherwood wrote, "the 1400 will carry three adults, but two is better, and the most fun on any board boat is to sail it alone. There is a traditional halyard, and with a loose-footed sail and no stays, preparing the boat for cartopping is simple. The beam is fairly wide, providing higher-than-average board boat stability — but on board boats, expect to get wet."

== See also ==
- List of sailing boat types

Similar sailboats

- Laser (dinghy)
- Sunfish (sailboat)
