= Flying Phantom Elite =

Sailboat class

Development
- Designer: Martin Fischer
- Location: France
- Year: 2015
- Builder: Phantom International
- Role: One-design racer
- Name: Flying Phantom Elite

Boat
- Displacement: 363 lb (165 kg)

Hull
- Type: Catamaran
- Construction: Carbon fibre and Nomex honeycomb sandwich
- LOA: 18.11 ft (5.52 m)
- Beam: 9.84 ft (3.00 m)

Hull appendages
- Keel: retractable hydrofoils
- Rudder: transom-mounted rudders

Rig
- Rig type: Bermuda rig

Sails
- Sailplan: Fractional rigged sloop
- Mainsail area: 199.18 sq ft (18.504 m^{2})
- Jib/genoa area: 53.82 sq ft (5.000 m^{2})
- Gennaker area: 258.33 sq ft (24.000 m^{2})
- Total sail area: 253.00 sq ft (23.504 m^{2})

The Flying Phantom Elite is a French hydrofoil catamaran sailing dinghy that was designed by Martin Fischer and draws on the work of Alex Udin, Franck Cammas and the Groupama sailing team. It is intended as a one-design racer and was first built in 2015.

The Flying Phantom Essentiel was developed in 2017 as an easier to sail hydrofoil than the Flying Phantom Elite.

== Production ==
The design was built by Phantom International in Dinard France from 2015 to about 2017, but the company is no longer in business and it is now out of production.

== Design ==
The Flying Phantom Elite is a racing sailboat, built predominantly of a pre-preg carbon fibre and Nomex honeycomb sandwich. It has a fractional sloop rig with a carbon fibre mast. The hulls have reverse-raked stems, vertical transoms, transom-hung rudders controlled by a tiller and retractable hydrofoils. It displaces 363 lb (165 kg).

The dual rudders are T-shaped, while the dual hydrofoil daggerboards are L-shaped. All are made from pre-preg, autoclave-cured carbon fibre.

The boat's mainsail and jib are made from VXM Black Technora membrane, while the gennaker is polyester.

== See also ==
- List of sailing boat types
- List of multihulls

Related development

- Flying Phantom Essentiel
