= Rascal 14 =

Sailboat class

- Class symbol

Development
- Designer: Ray Greene
- Location: United States
- Year: 1961
- No. built: 3,000
- Builder: Ray Greene & Company
- Role: Sailing dinghy
- Name: Rascal 14

Boat
- Displacement: 400 lb (181 kg)
- Draft: 3.00 ft (0.91 m) with the centerboard down

Hull
- Type: Monohull
- Construction: Fiberglass
- LOA: 14.42 ft (4.40 m)
- LWL: 13.83 ft (4.22 m)
- Beam: 6.00 ft (1.83 m)

Hull appendages
- Keel: centerboard
- Rudder: transom-mounted rudder

Rig
- Rig type: Bermuda rig

Sails
- Sailplan: Fractional rigged sloop
- Mainsail area: 72 sq ft (6.7 m^{2})
- Jib/genoa area: 49 sq ft (4.6 m^{2})
- Spinnaker area: 160 sq ft (15 m^{2})
- Total sail area: 121 sq ft (11.2 m^{2})

Racing
- D-PN: 108.9

The Rascal 14 is an American sailing dinghy that was designed by Ray Greene and first built in 1961.

The Rascal 14 design was developed into the slightly modified Rascal II.

== Production ==
The design was built by Ray Greene & Company in the United States. The company built 3,000 examples of the design starting in 1961, but production had ended by the time the company went out of business in 1975.

== Design ==
The Rascal 14 is a recreational sailboat, built predominantly of fiberglass, with teak wood trim. It has a fractional sloop rig with black-colored, hard-coated aluminum spars and a tabernacle-mounted mast. The hull has a spooned plumb stem, a vertical transom, a transom-hung rudder controlled by a tiller and a retractable centerboard mounted in an enclosed trunk. It displaces 400 lb (181 kg) and can be fitted with a 160 sq ft (15 m^{2}) spinnaker.

The boat has a draft of 3.00 ft (0.91 m) with the centerboard extended and 11 in (28 cm) with it retracted, allowing beaching or ground transportation on a trailer.

For sailing the design is equipped with a jib window and adjustable jib tracks. Foam flotation provides positive buoyancy and the boat has two storage lockers, one forward and one aft.

The design has a Portsmouth Yardstick racing average handicap of 108.9 and is normally raced with a crew of two sailors.

== Operational history ==
Sail magazine named the Rascal a "breakthrough boat", due to its intended role for beginners and first-time boat buyers.

== See also ==
- List of sailing boat types
