= Topper Topaz =

Sailboat class

Topper Topaz Uno
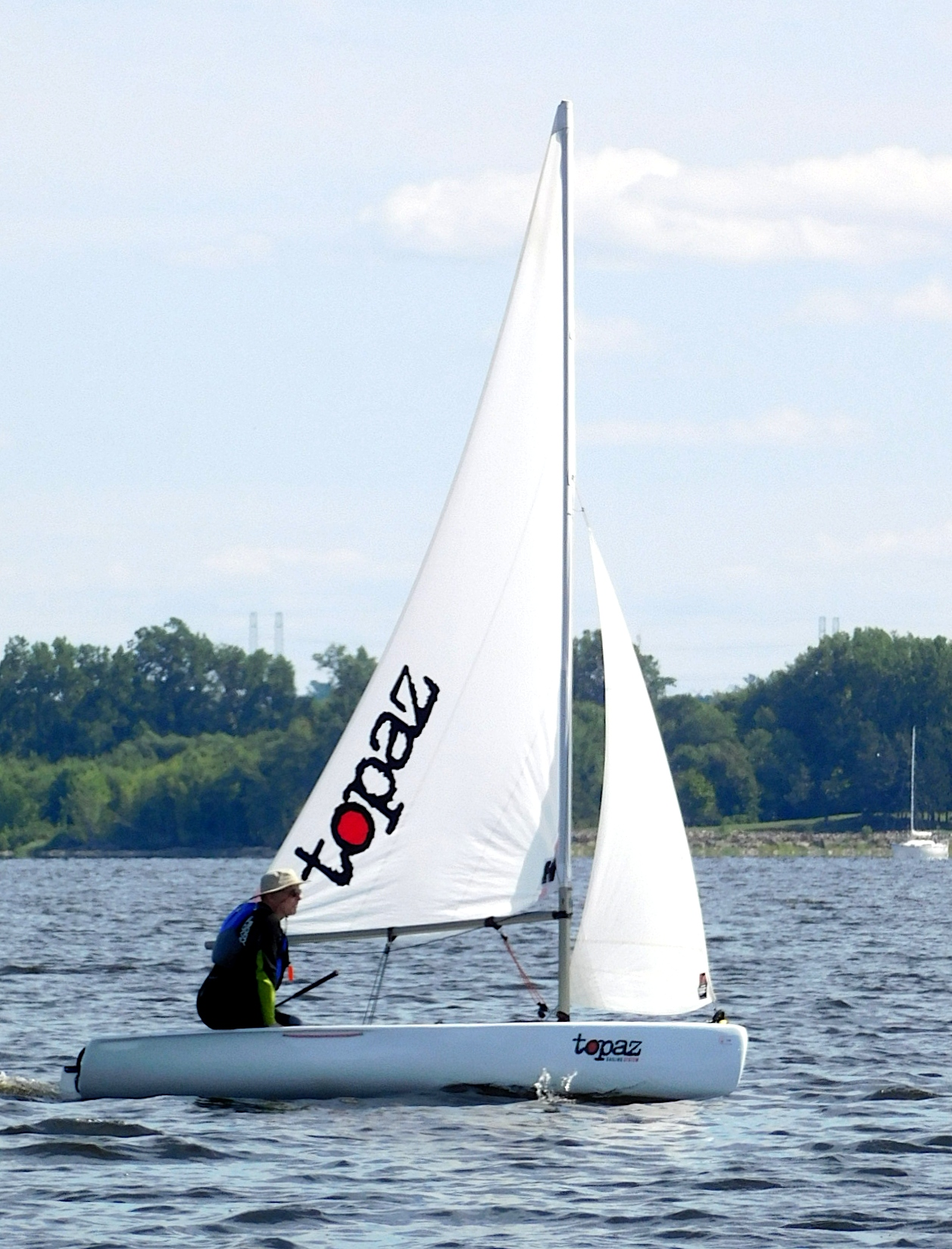
- Topaz Uno Plus

Development
- Location: United Kingdom
- Builder: Topper International
- Name: Topper Topaz Uno

Boat
- Crew: One or two
- Displacement: 60 kg (132 lb) hull

Hull
- Type: Monohull
- Construction: tri-laminate
- LOA: 3.86 m (12.7 ft)
- Beam: 1.45 m (4.8 ft)

Hull appendages
- Keel: daggerboard
- Ballast: none
- Rudder: transom-mounted rudder

Rig
- Rig type: Bermuda rig

Sails
- Sailplan: Fractional rigged sloop
- Mainsail area: 5.64 m^{2} (60.7 sq ft)
- Jib/genoa area: 1.75 m^{2} (18.8 sq ft)
- Total sail area: 7.39 m^{2} (79.5 sq ft)

The Topper Topaz is a British single-handed or two-handed sailing dinghy that was designed as a beginner and intermediate racer.

The boat is referred to by the manufacturer as the Topaz System, as the basic hull can be fitted with four interchangeable rig and sail combinations, with the aim of matching performance to sailor skill level.

The design is recognized as an International Sailing Federation (ISAF) Learn To Sail Class and was named Best Dinghy by Sail Magazine.

== Production ==
The design is built by Topper International in the United Kingdom.

== Design ==
The Topaz is a recreational sailboat, with the hull built from a Metalicene superlinear polyethylene and honeycomb structure tri-laminate. It has a fractional sloop rig, with a tapered mast, a plumb stem, a reverse transom, a transom-hung rudder controlled by a tiller with a hiking stick and a daggerboard. The hull displaces 60 kg (132 lb)

== Variants ==
Topaz Uno Plus
This base model has a dacron mainsail and jib with an area totalling 7.39 m^{2} (79.5 sq ft)
Topaz Race
This model has a clear, fully-battened mylar mainsail and jib with an area totalling 8.68 m^{2} (93.4 sq ft)
Topaz Race X
This model has a clear, fully-battened mylar mainsail and jib with an area totalling 8.68 m^{2} (93.4 sq ft), plus an 8.41 m^{2} (90.5 sq ft) asymmetrical spinnaker.
Topaz Tres X
This model has a clear, fully-battened mylar mainsail and jib with an area totalling 8.68 m^{2} (93.4 sq ft), plus an asymmetrical 8.41 m^{2} (90.5 sq ft) spinnaker and a trapeze.

== Operational history ==
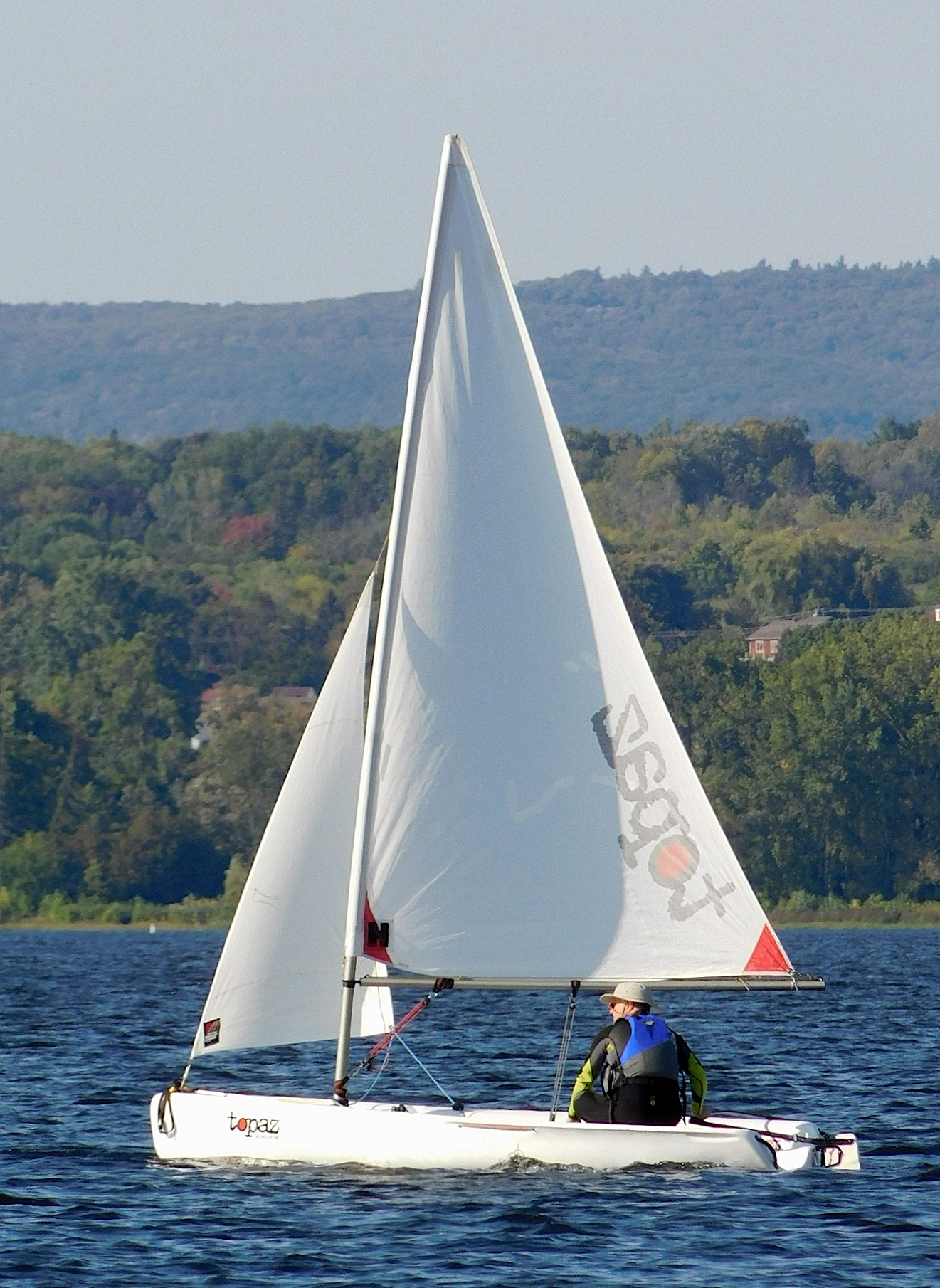
Topper Topaz Uno Plus

An evaluation published in Yachts and Yachting concluded that the Race X model provides "seriously fast sailing for the club sailor right through to a professional sailor. The asymmetric system is simple, easy to use and easy to rig and takes the boat to yet another level only found in boats costing twice the retail price." About the Tres the report states, "Once the kite [spinnaker] is up, the Tres fairly shoots away. Reaching performance is truly in the apparent wind sailing league".

In a Sailing World article in 2017, American writer Tim Zimmermann praised the design as the ideal boat for a family with young children learning to sail. He indicated that the boat combines excitement, durability, versatility, is fast to rig and de-rig, "semi-indestructible", affordable and able to accommodate a three or more children, or a child and an adult.

== See also ==
- List of sailing boat types

Similar sailboats

- Laser (dinghy)
- Laser 2
