= Laser 4000 =

Racing dinghy designed by Phil Morrison

Laser 4000 (4000)
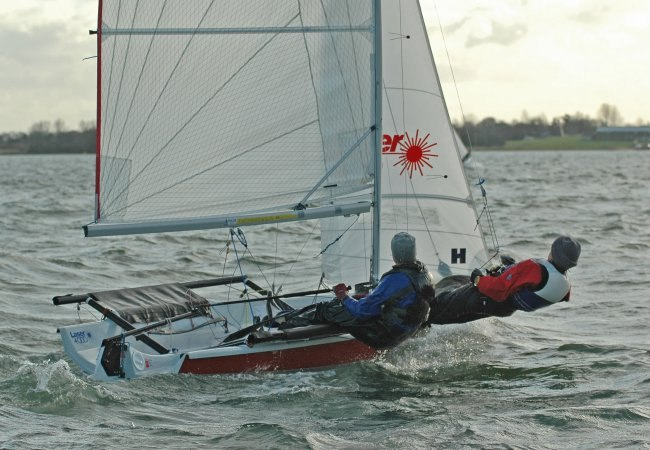
- A Laser 4000 sailing upwind

Development
- Designer: Phil Morrison
- Year: 1994
- Design: One-design
- Name: Laser 4000 (4000)

Boat
- Crew: 2
- Trapeze: One

Hull
- Type: Monohull
- Construction: Fiberglass
- LOA: 4.64 metres (15.2 ft)
- Beam: 1.50 metres (4.9 ft); 2.30 metres (7.5 ft)

Rig
- Mast height: 7.10 metres (23.3 ft)

Sails
- Mainsail area: 10.80 square metres (116.3 sq ft)
- Jib/genoa area: 3.90 square metres (42.0 sq ft)
- Spinnaker area: 17.10 square metres (184.1 sq ft)

Racing
- D-PN: 80.7
- RYA PN: 911

The Laser 4000 (now "4000") is a racing dinghy designed by Phil Morrison crewed by two people. Its one-design weight-equalised system enables physically differing sailors to compete on a level playing field. It is most popular in Europe, particularly the UK, France and Italy.

The 4000 is a fast, planing skiff-style dinghy with a trapeze for the crew and trampolines for the helm. Upwind, the boat does not point especially close to the wind, but its fully battened sails give enough power to keep up with similar-sized boats. Downwind, however is where the boat excels due to its asymmetrical spinnaker (a.k.a. gennaker). In a force 3 the 4000 will plane and the crew will make full use of the trapeze wire. However, force 4-5 is when the boat performs its optimum. The 4000 is fast enough to make use of the apparent wind to reach the bottom of the racecourse sooner.

In lighter winds, many crews make use of the jibing gennaker pole when sailing downwind. This allows them to show a larger part of the spinnaker to the wind whilst sailing further away from the wind direction.

== Features ==
The Laser 4000 was designed in 1994 by Phil Morrison. It is a sloop rigged dinghy constructed from fiberglass. It features a single trapeze as well as an open, self-draining cockpit. Instead of a conventional kicking strap it features a gnav system, which pushes down on the boom from the top, instead of pulling from the bottom. This allows greater space for the crew to move from side to side. Boat manufacture is well known to be of a very high quality and durability, thus hulls from the very first molds are still competing effectively.

However recently Laser has handed over the rules and administration of the class to the Laser 4000 class association and thus there is significant scope for boat improvement. Many people want to see the addition of carbon spars and lighter hulls (nickname = 4 tonner!). However, the class is adamant that it will stay a one class design and not a class open to unlimited modification such as the International 14 class.

== Friendly competition ==
Over the years Laser 4000 events have given the fleet a reputation as competitive but friendly, with the day's racing followed by lively evening socials. The equalisation system coupled with relatively low sheet loads mean that a good variety of people are able to sail the boat.

There are currently 3 very populated and active classes in Italy, France and the United Kingdom. The 2023 Eurocup will be held in France and the 2024 Europeans will be in Riva del Garda.

== Equalisation system ==
A long-running problem in dinghy racing is that light sailors are faster in light winds due to their lesser displacement and heavier sailors gain speed in stronger winds due to their increased righting moment. In the early 90s Laser addressed this problem with their equalisation system for both the Laser 5000 and Laser 4000.

When racing one of these boats, lightweight crews are required to carry up to 4 lead weights in their boat (securely fastened in the centre). To compensate for their lack of capsize-preventing leverage, they are also allowed to extend the boat's rack outwards, effectively making the boat wider. Conversely, heavier crews will carry fewer weights, but must sail with narrower racks. Thus each team's total weight and leverage is equalised. The Laser 4000 equalisation system accommodates helms and crews weighing from 59 to 94 kg (130 to 207 lb) each. Beyond that range the traditional wind strength advantages and disadvantages come into play.

Years of competitive racing have proved the system to be effective with all sizes of crews winning in all wind strengths. Several other racing dinghy classes have adopted a similar equalisation systems.

As with many modern racing dinghies, the Laser 4000 is one-design, meaning that strict rules govern the modification of the boat, its sailing and equipment. This is to prevent an expensive competition of "modification racing", where only those who could afford the latest gadgets would stand a chance of winning.

== See also ==
- Laser Performance, manufacturer of the Laser 4000 and many other dinghies
