= Picnic 17 =

Sailboat class

- P

Development
- Designer: Nils Lucander
- Location: United States
- Year: 1959
- No. built: 350
- Builders: General Boats; Lofland Sail-craft
- Role: Sailboat/powerboat cruiser hybrid
- Name: Picnic 17

Boat
- Displacement: 700 lb (318 kg)
- Draft: 2.25 ft (0.69 m) with centerboard down

Hull
- Type: monohull
- Construction: fiberglass
- LOA: 17.00 ft (5.18 m)
- LWL: 15.33 ft (4.67 m)
- Beam: 6.50 ft (1.98 m)
- Engine: outboard motor or a Berkeley jet-pump

Hull appendages
- Keel: centerboard
- Ballast: none
- Rudder: transom-mounted rudder

Rig
- Rig type: Bermuda rig

Sails
- Sailplan: fractional rigged sloop
- Total sail area: 187.00 sq ft (17.373 m^{2})

The Picnic 17 is an American trailerable boat that was designed by Nils Lucander as a sailboat/powerboat cruiser hybrid and first built in 1959.

== Production ==
The design was built by General Boats of Edenton, North Carolina and also Lofland Sail-craft of Wichita, Kansas, both in the United States. Production was started in 1959 and ended in 1972, with 350 boats were completed.

== Design ==
The Picnic 17 is a recreational boat, built predominantly of fiberglass. It has a fractional sloop rig, a raked stem, a slightly angled transom, a transom-hung rudder controlled by a tiller and a retractable centerboard. It displaces 700 lb (318 kg) and has no ballast.

The boat has a draft of 2.25 ft (0.69 m) with the centerboard extended and 0.83 ft (0.25 m) with it retracted, allowing operation in shallow water, beaching or ground transportation on a trailer.

The boat maybe optionally fitted with an outboard motor of up to 40 hp (30 kW). It could also be powered by a Briggs & Stratton lawnmower engine coupled to a Berkeley jet pump. It was designed to be able to tow waterskiers under power.

For sailing downwind the design may be equipped with a symmetrical spinnaker.

The design has sleeping accommodation for two people, although the manufacturer claimed it could sleep five people. It has a double "V"-berth in the bow cabin. The galley is located on the port side at the companionway ladder. The head is located opposite the galley on the starboard side. Cabin headroom is 46 in (117 cm).

The design has a hull speed of 5.2 kn (9.6 km/h).

== Operational history ==
In a 2010 review Steve Henkel wrote, "this is one of the first fiberglass sailboats, sold beginning around 1959, and was claimed by the marketer to do "everything." Even though she's only 17 feet long, she supposedly sleeps five (though we don't see where), Even though she weighs only 700 pounds all up (i.e., with spars and sails), she supposedly can handle a 40-horse outboard, plane, and tow waterskiers. The flared hull shape supposedly deflects spray so the cockpit stays bone dry. But she never caught on, though available new for thirteen years—perhaps because she didn't live up to her advertised capabilities. Best features: If you really want to waterski behind your sailboat, this is one of the few sailboats specifically designed to do that—though we'd rather opt for a ski boat to tow skiers, plus a separate sailboat to go sailing. Worst features: Her narrow waterline beam combined with big rig (compared to her comps, the Picnic has the highest SA/D) tends to make her a bit tippy in a breeze."

== See also ==
- List of sailing boat types
