= Sea Pearl 21 =

Sailboat class

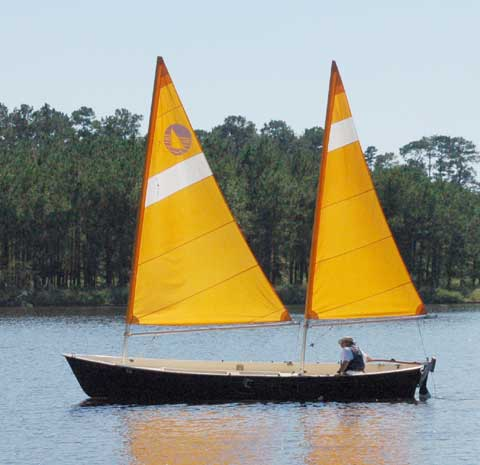

Development
- Designer: Ron Johnson
- Location: United States
- Year: 1982
- No. built: 415
- Builder: Marine Concepts
- Role: Day sailer

Boat
- Displacement: 600 lb (272 kg)
- Draft: 2.50 ft (0.76 m) with centerboard down

Hull
- Type: monohull
- Construction: fiberglass
- LOA: 21.00 ft (6.40 m)
- LWL: 19.00 ft (5.79 m)
- Beam: 5.50 ft (1.68 m)
- Engine: outboard motor

Hull appendages
- Keel: centerboard or leeboards
- Ballast: 360 lb (163 kg) of water (optional)
- Rudder: transom-mounted rudder

Rig
- Rig type: ketch

Sails
- Sailplan: cat rigged ketch
- Total sail area: 136.00 sq ft (12.635 m^{2})

The Sea Pearl 21 is a sailing dinghy built by Marine Concepts, of Tarpon Springs, Florida, United States, starting 1982, with 415 boats completed, but it is now out of production.

== Design ==
The Sea Pearl 21 is a development of, or at least inspired by, the 1929 Herreshoff Carpenter design by L. Francis Herreshoff.

The Sea Pearl 21 is a recreational dinghy or a keelboat, if fitted with the optional ballast tanks holding 360 lb (163 kg) of water. The boat is built predominantly of fiberglass, with wood trim and has forward decking. It is a cat rigged ketch, with two unstayed masts. A lug sail rig was optional. The hull has a raked stem; an angled, canoe transom; a transom-hung rudder controlled by a tiller and a retractable, trunk-mounted centerboard or optionally twin leeboards. It displaces 600 lb (272 kg), has positive foam flotation making it unsinkable and can carry 360 lb (163 kg) of water ballast, if fitted with the optional tanks. The ballast is drained for road transport.

There is also a trimaran version, with outriggers for stability, giving a 14.00 ft (4.27 m) beam and a displacement of 950 lb (431 kg) that was first built in 1993.

The centerboard-equipped model has a draft of 2.50 ft (0.76 m) with the centerboard extended and 6 in (15 cm) with it retracted, allowing operation in shallow water, beaching or ground transportation on a trailer.

The boat may be fitted with a small 3 to 6 hp (2 to 4 kW) outboard motor for docking and maneuvering.

The design has two cockpits, an aft, self-draining one and a forward, non-self-draining one. Sleeping accommodations for two people are available in the forward cockpit, under a folding canvas cabin roof and with the removable cockpit thwart stowed.

The design has a hull speed of 5.8 kn (10.7 km/h).

== Reception ==
In a 2010 review Steve Henkel wrote, "this little decked-over double-ended cat ketch is said to have its design origins in L. Francis Herreshoff's 'Carpenter,' designed in 1929 ... —though we see only a minor resemblance. The Sea Pearl comes with a tonneau cover for the forward cockpit, which is non-self-bailing, but also can be rigged with an optional 'canvas cabin.' A small steering cockpit aft of the mizzen is self-bailing. The base boat has a centerboard, but optional leeboards are available, as are twin lug rigs and water ballast tanks carrying 360 pounds ... Best features: Foam flotation makes her unsinkable. Split rig (main and mizzen) permit playing with trim, such as flying the sails wing and wing downwind. Being considerably lighter than her comp[etitor]s, she is easier to rig, launch, and retrieve on a ramp. Worst features: Narrow and dory-like, the hull has little initial stability—big crew may be necessary in heavy air to keep her on her feet. Boom vangs, an option, should have been made standard, as they are essential to enjoyable sailing. Though it would be fairly simple, no provision has been made for a third mast position where either the main or the mizzen could be stepped, giving her additional versatility."

In a 2015 review in Boats.com noted, "the Sea Pearl is a double ender along the lines of an old whaleboat. The boat is half-decked with two cockpits and 2 mast Marconi rig. Reefing is simple by just rotating the masts. A handy convertible tent that looks somewhat like a pram hood can cover the forward cockpit area, or can be rolled up when not needed."
