= Tiwal (company) =

French sailboat manufacturer

- Type: Private
- Industry: Sailboat manufacturing
- Founded: 2012
- Founder: Marion Excoffon, Emmanuel Bertrand
- Headquarters: Plescop, France
- Website: tiwal.com

Tiwal is a French sailboat manufacturer that manufactures inflatable sailing dinghies used for sport and leisure. It is headquartered in Plescop, France and also has a subsidiary in the USA.

== History ==
Founder Marion Excoffon developed the design for Tiwal's inflatable dinghies when her father refused to lend her his houseboat in 2008. Using her design, she founded Tiwal with her partner Emmanuel Bertrand in Theix-Noyalo in August 2012 before the company eventually moved operations into a warehouse in Plescop. Tiwal unveiled its first sailboat at the 2012 Paris Boat Show. It was also exhibited at the Annapolis Boat Show.

Tiwal established a subsidiary in the United States in 2014. It also exhibited the Tiwal 3.2 at the 2014 London Boatshow.

Tiwal participated in the 2018 Annapolis Boat Show. The company also presented the Tiwal 2 at the Boot Düsseldorf boat show in 2018. A Tiwal sailboat was also exhibited at the Museum of Modern Art in New York in the same year.

Since 2015, Tiwal has also hosted the Tiwal Cup, a regatta using Tiwal inflatable dinghies, in the Gulf of Morbihan in Brittany. Tiwal has also held Tiwal Cups in New Zealand.

== Economic development ==
Tiwal boats are sold in more than 50 countries, with a strong international presence, particularly in the USA. The company generates approximately 80% of its turnover from exports. More than 3,000 Tiwal dinghies sail around the world.

== Design ==
Tiwal uses drop-stitch technology hulls which, after high-pressure inflation, provide a highly rigid structure. All hulls feature a patented hydrodynamic V-shaped hull, designed to enhance performance and manoeuvrability in different sailing conditions. The sails are developed in partnership with North Sails, an international sail manufacturer.

== Model launch history ==
- Tiwal 3 released in 2012
- Tiwal 2 released in 2019
- Tiwal 3R released in 2022
- Tiwal 2L released in 2022
- Tiwal 2XL released in 2025
- Tiwal 3R Max released in 2026

== Technical specifications ==
All Tiwal inflatable dinghy models
| Model | Tiwal 3 | Tiwal 3R | Tiwal 3R Max | Tiwal 2 | Tiwal 2L | Tiwal 2XL |
|---|---|---|---|---|---|---|
| Length overall | 11' (3.35m) | 11' (3.35m) | 11'2" (3.40m) | 9'8" (2.95m) | 11'4" (3.45m) | 13' (3.95m) |
| Beam | 5'4" (1.62m) | 5'4" (1.62m) | 5'4" (1.62m) | 4'11" (1.50m) | 4'11" (1.50m) | 5'2" (1.56m) |
| Draft | 2'5" (75cm) | 2'5" (75cm) | 2'5" (75cm) | 2'5" (75cm) | 2'5" (75cm) | 2'5" (75cm) |
| Weight | 110 lb (50 kg) | 121 lb (55 kg) | 134 lb (61kg) | 90 lb (40 kg) | 103 lb (47kg) | 120 lb (54kg) |
| Height overall | 17'8" (5.40m) | 17'8" (5.40m) | 17'8" (5.40m) | 17'8" (5.40m) | 17'8" (5.40m) | 17'8" (5.40m) |
| Mast height | 16'1" (4.90m) | 16'1" (4.90m) | 16'1" (4.90m) | 16'1" (4.90m) | 16'1" (4.90m) | 16'1" (4.90m) |
| Inflatable hull dimensions | 10'6" x 4'6" (3.20m x 1.36m) | 10'6" x 4'6" (3.20m x 1.36m) | 10'6" x 4'6" (3.20m x 1.36m) | 9'2" x 4'11" (2.80m x 1.50m) | 10'10" x 4'11" (3.30m x 1.50m) | 12'6" x 5'2" (3.80m x 1.56m) |
| Hull pressure | 11 psi | 11 psi | 11 psi | 11 psi / 3 psi | 11 psi / 3 psi | 11 psi / 3 psi |
| Sail area | 56 to 75ft² (5.2 to 7.2m²) | 67 to 77 ft² (6.2 to 7.2m²) | 67 to 77 ft² (6.2 to 7.2m²) + jib 21ft² (2m²) + gennaker 32ft² (3m²) | 52 to 64ft² (4.8 to 6m²) | 56 to 75ft² (5.2 to 7.2m²) | 75 to 97ft² (7 to 9m²) + jib 21ft² (2m²) |
| Max capacity | 2 adults | 2 adults | 2 adults | 1 adult | 2 adults | 3 adults |
| Production years | 2012 - present | 2022 - present | 2026 - present | 2019 - present | 2022 - present | 2025 - present |
| Boats built | 2600 | 200 | 300 | 250 | - | - |
| MFG | Europe | Europe | Europe | Europe | Europe | Europe |
| Transport | 2 bags | 2 bags + 1 sail bag | 3 bags + 1 sail bag | 2 bags | 2 bags | 2 bags + 1 sail bag |
| Assembly time | 20 minutes | 25 minutes | 30 to 40 minutes | 15 minutes | 15 minutes | 25 minutes |
| Description | inflatable sailing dinghy for versatile use - solo or duo | inflatable sailing dinghy for sporting use - single or duo | inflatable sailing dinghy for sporting use - single or duo | inflatable sailing dinghy for recreational use - solo | inflatable sailing dinghy for recreational use - solo or duo | inflatable sailing dinghy for recreational use - family |

== International Success & Awards ==
- Tiwal 3 - Sailing World's Boat of the Year 2014
- Tiwal 3 - Best of the Best Reddot Award 2014
- Tiwal 2 - Sailing World's Boat of the Year 2020
- Tiwal 2 - Sail's Best Boats Winner 2020
- Tiwal 3R - Sailing World's Boat of the Year 2023
- Tiwal 3R - Sail's Best Boats Winner 2023
