= F-24 Sport Cruiser =

Sailboat class

- ꟻF24

Development
- Designer: Ian Farrier
- Location: United States
- Year: 1991
- Builder: Corsair Marine
- Role: Cruiser
- Name: F-24 Sport Cruiser

Boat
- Displacement: 1,800 lb (816 kg)
- Draft: 4.67 ft (1.42 m) with daggerboard down

Hull
- Type: trimaran
- Construction: fiberglass
- LOA: 24.17 ft (7.37 m)
- LWL: 23.58 ft (7.19 m)
- Beam: 17.92 ft (5.46 m)
- Engine: outboard motor

Hull appendages
- Keel: daggerboard
- Rudder: transom-mounted rudder

Rig
- Rig type: Bermuda rig

Sails
- Sailplan: fractional rigged sloop
- Total sail area: 401.00 sq ft (37.254 m^{2})

The F-24 Sport Cruiser is an American trailerable trimaran that was designed by Ian Farrier as a cruising version of the Farrier F-24. It was first built in 1991.

Based on the larger F-27 Sport Cruiser, the F-24 Sport Cruiser design was developed into the Corsair 24 Mark II, also called the F-24 Mark II in 1994.

== Production ==
The design was built by Corsair Marine in the United States, from 1991 to 1994, but it is now out of production.

== Design ==
The F-24 Sport Cruiser is a recreational sailboat, built predominantly of vacuum bag molded fiberglass, Kevlar, carbon fiber over a foam core. It has a fractional sloop rig with a rotating mast. The hull and outriggers have nearly plumb stems and reverse transoms. The hull has an open transom, a transom-hung rudder controlled by a tiller and a retractable daggerboard. It displaces 1,800 lb (816 kg) and carries no ballast.

The beam is 17.92 ft (5.46 m) with the outriggers deployed and 8.17 ft (2.49 m) them folded.

The boat has a draft of 4.67 ft (1.42 m) with the daggerboard extended and 12 in (30 cm) with it retracted, allowing operation in shallow water, beaching or ground transportation on a trailer.

The design has sleeping accommodation for two adults and two children. The galley is equipped with a stove and a sink. A head is also provided.

The design has a hull speed of 6.51 kn (12.06 km/h).

== See also ==
- List of sailing boat types
