= Corsair Cruze 970 =

Sailboat class

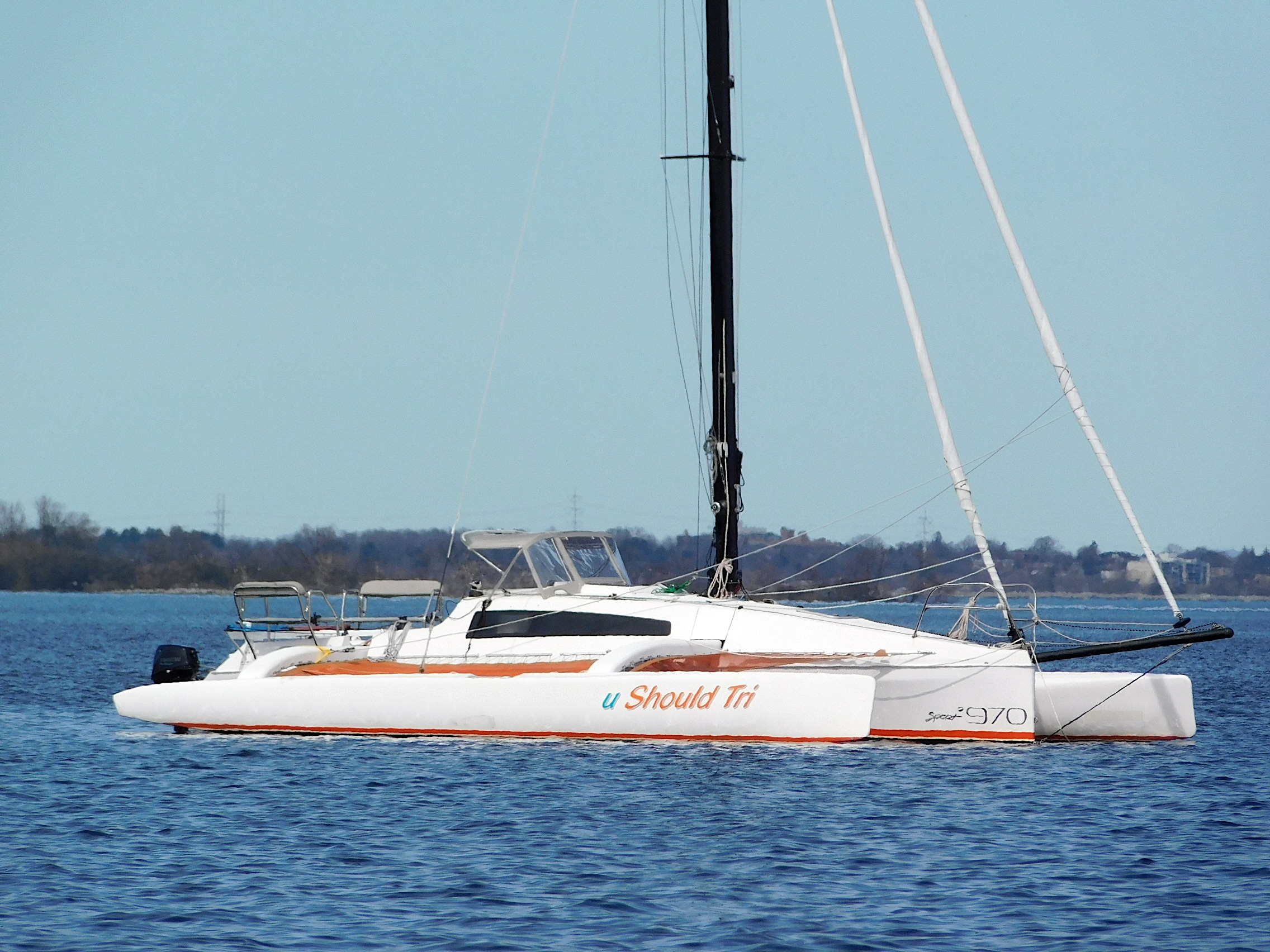
- [T]970

Development
- Designer: Corsair Design Team
- Location: Vietnam
- Year: 2012
- Builder: Corsair Marine
- Role: Cruiser
- Name: Corsair Cruze 970

Boat
- Displacement: 4,808 lb (2,181 kg)
- Draft: 6.89 ft (2.10 m) with daggerboard down

Hull
- Type: trimaran
- Construction: fiberglass
- LOA: 31.82 ft (9.70 m)
- LWL: 31.00 ft (9.45 m)
- Beam: 22.57 ft (6.88 m)
- Engine: outboard motor

Hull appendages
- Keel: daggerboard
- Rudder: transom-mounted rudder

Rig
- Rig type: Bermuda rig

Sails
- Sailplan: fractional rigged sloop
- Mainsail area: 417.64 sq ft (38.800 m^{2})
- Jib/genoa area: 217 sq ft (20.2 m^{2})
- Spinnaker area: 992.43 sq ft (92.200 m^{2})
- Other sails: Screecher: 448 sq ft (41.6 m^{2})
- Upwind sail area: 634.64 sq ft (58.960 m^{2})

The Corsair Cruze 970, also called the Corsair 970, is a Vietnamese trailerable sailboat that was designed by the Corsair Design Team as a cruiser and first built in 2012. The boat is a development of the Corsair 31.

== Production ==
The design has been built by Corsair Marine in Vietnam since 2012 and remains in production.

== Design ==
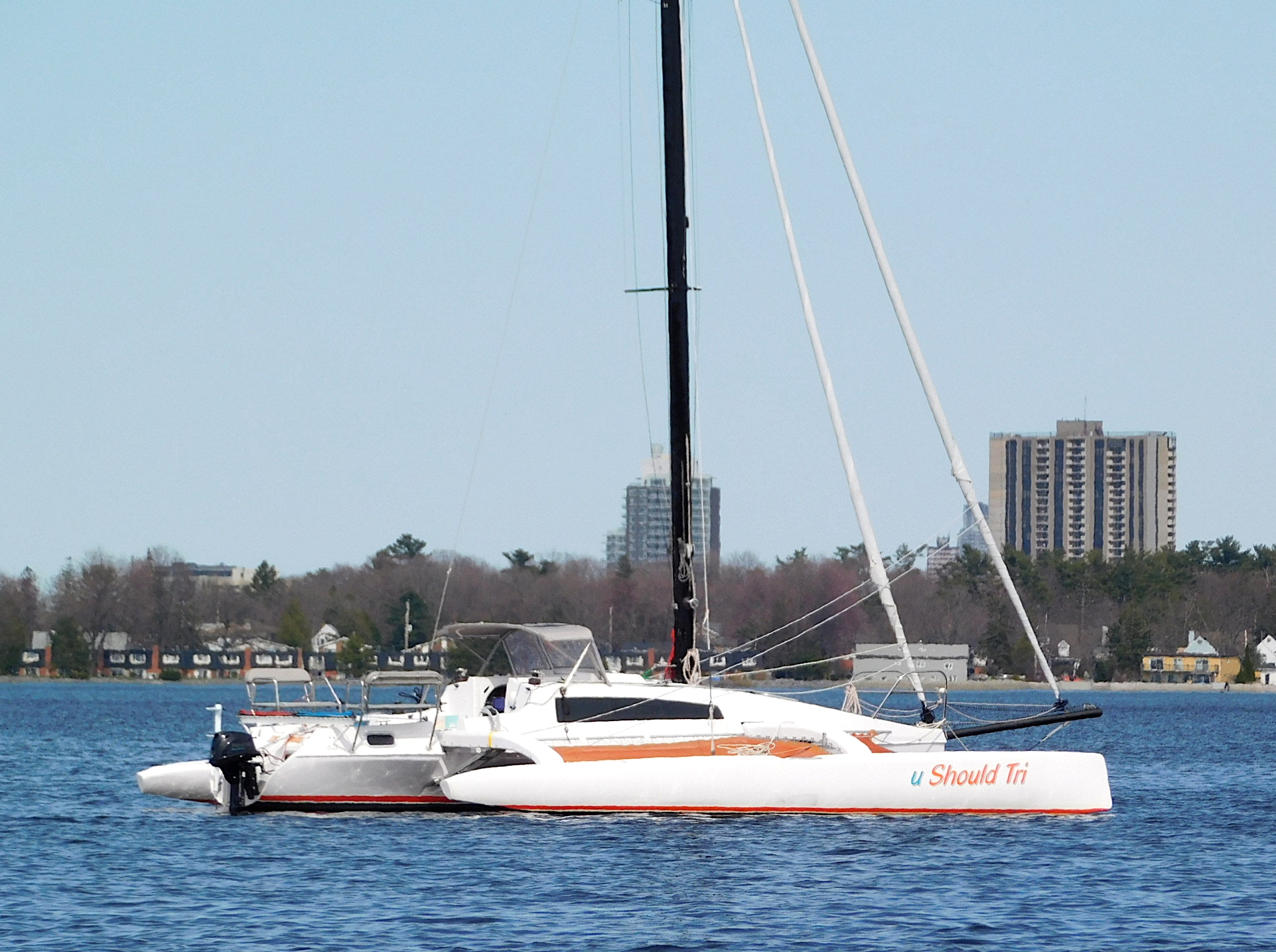
Corsair Cruze 970

The design is based on the Corsair 31, which was in turn based on the Farrier F-31. The designer, Ian Farrier, had sold the rights to the F-31 to Corsair in 2000.

The Corsair Cruze 970 is a recreational trimaran, built predominantly of fiberglass over a PVC core. It has a fractional sloop rig with a rotating airfoil mast and a bowsprit. the hull and outriggers have plumb stems and transoms. The main hull has a kick-up, transom-hung rudder controlled by a tiller and a retractable daggerboard. It displaces 4,808 lb (2,181 kg) and carries no ballast.

The boat has a draft of 6.89 ft (2.10 m) with the daggerboard extended and 1.48 ft (0.45 m) with it retracted, allowing operation in shallow water, beaching or ground transportation on a trailer.

The design has a beam of 8.33 ft (2.54 m) with the outriggers folded for docking or trailering and 22.57 ft (6.88 m) with them unfolded for sailing.

The boat is normally fitted with a small outboard motor for docking and maneuvering. The recommended engine is a 9.9 hp (7 kW) Yamaha Corporation four stroke, high thrust, extra long shaft.

The design has sleeping accommodation for four people, with a double "V"-berth in the bow cabin and an aft cabin with a double berth. The galley is located on the starboard side just forward of the companionway ladder. The galley is equipped with a two-burner stove and a sink. The head is located just aft of the bow cabin on both sides. The fresh water tank has a capacity of 40 U.S. gallons (150 L; 33 imp gal) and the holding tank has a capacity of 13 U.S. gallons (49 L; 11 imp gal).

For sailing the design may be equipped with 448 sq ft (41.6 m^{2}) screecher or a spinnaker of 992.43 sq ft (92.200 m^{2}).

The design has a hull speed of 7.56 kn (14.00 km/h).

== Operational history ==
Naval architect Robert Perry wrote in a 2013 for Sailing magazine, "I don't think you would spend much time under power in this tri. The SA/D is 36.47, and that's a lot of sail power per pound, easily enough to give you very good light air boat speed. The mast is a rotating wing. A carbon fiber bowsprit allows you to fly either a 448-square-foot screecher or an 893-square-foot chute. That is enough off-the-wind sail area to provide for some very exciting sailing. For some comparison, the 893-square-foot spinnaker is bigger than the entire rig of the Cal 40."

In a 2014 review for Cruising World, Tim Murphy wrote that the "970 features much thinner, higher-aspect-ratio foils that are optimized for speeds in the teens and higher. (A note to those who haven't sailed Corsairs before: Those boat speeds are real. Try it!) ... We sailed the 970 in light air. With the screacher up in 8 to 10 knots of breeze, we posted 6.6 knots just above 60 degrees apparent, then cracked off and made 7.6 knots."

== See also ==
- List of sailing boat types
