= F-27 Sport Cruiser =

Sailboat class

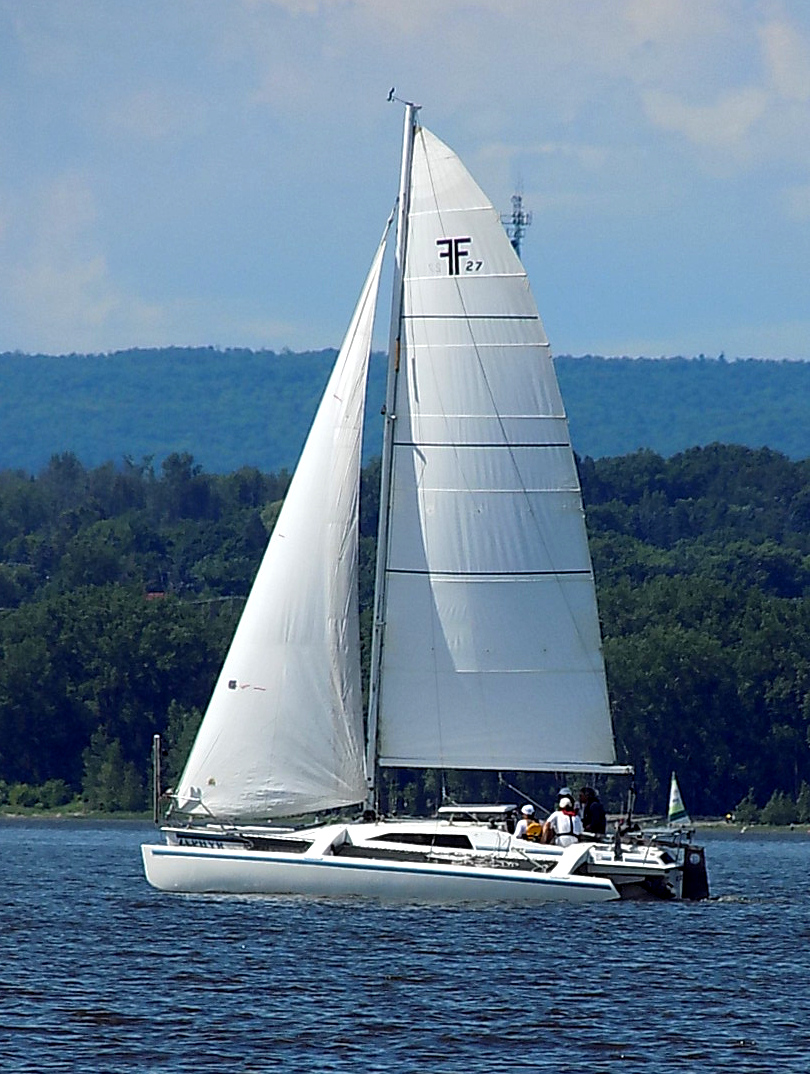

Development
- Designer: Ian Farrier
- Location: United States
- Year: 1985
- No. built: 450
- Builder: Corsair Marine
- Name: F-27 Sport Cruiser

Boat
- Draft: 1.5 m (4.9 ft) (board down); 0.36 m (1.2 ft) (board up)

Hull
- Type: trimaran
- Construction: Carbon fiber, fiberglass, Kevlar and foam
- Hull weight: 1,180 kg (2,600 lb)
- LOA: 8.25 m (27.1 ft)
- LWL: 8 m (26 ft)
- Beam: 5.82 m (19.1 ft); 2.57 m (8.4 ft) (folded)

Hull appendages
- Keel: Daggerboard

Rig
- Rig type: Fractional rigged sloop
- Mast height: 11.28 m (37.0 ft)

Sails
- Mainsail area: 25 m^{2} (270 sq ft)
- Jib/genoa area: 16.3 m^{2} (175 sq ft)
- Spinnaker area: 76.4 m^{2} (822 sq ft)
- Total sail area: 117.7 m^{2} (1,267 sq ft)

The F-27 Sport Cruiser is an American trailerable trimaran sailboat that was designed by New Zealander Ian Farrier in 1984–1985.

== Production ==
The boat was built by Corsair Marine in the United States between 1986 and February 1997, with 450 examples completed. The F-27 was replaced in production by the derivative F-28 design, later designated as the Corsair 28.

== Development ==
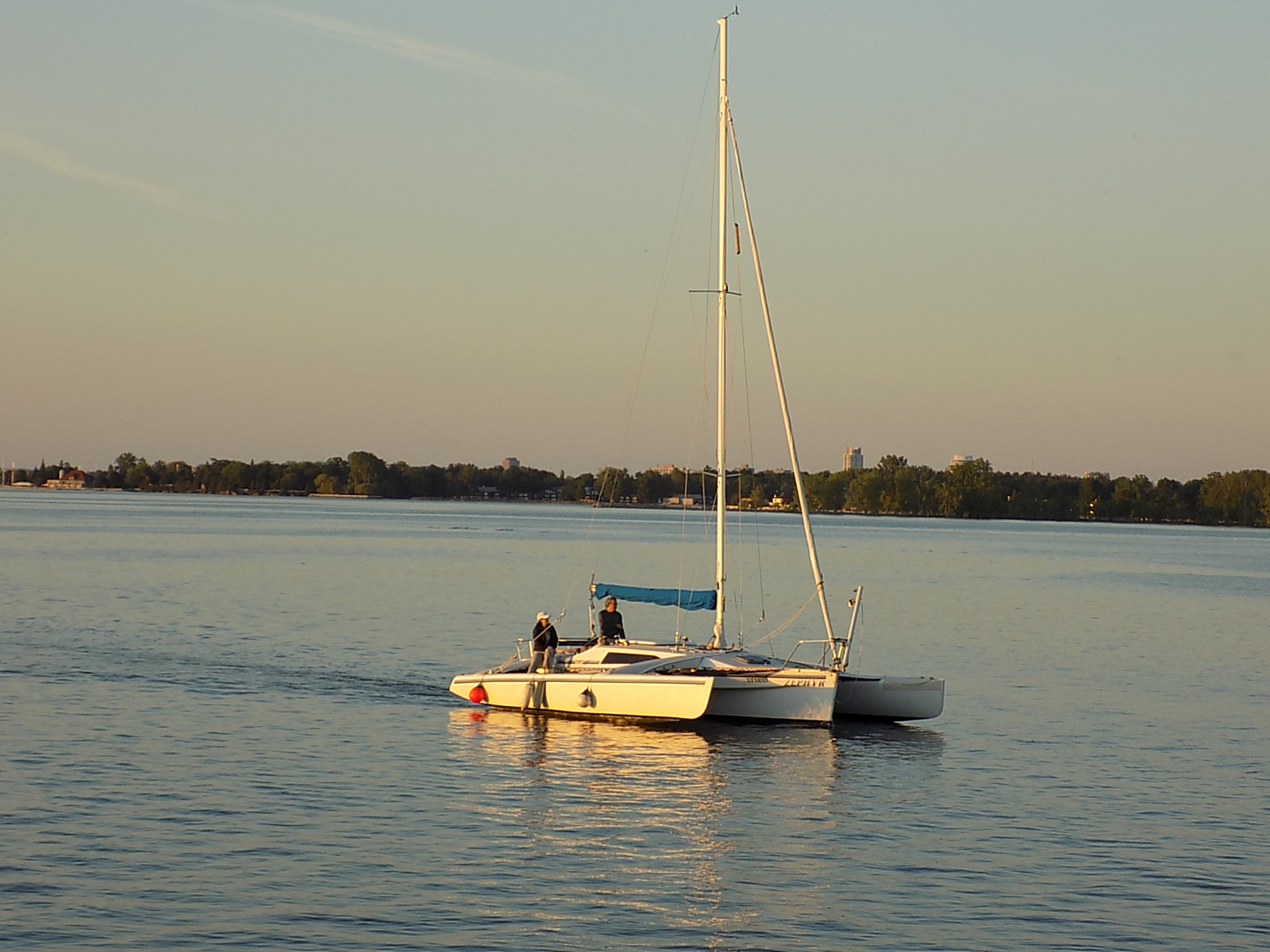
F-27 Sport Cruiser

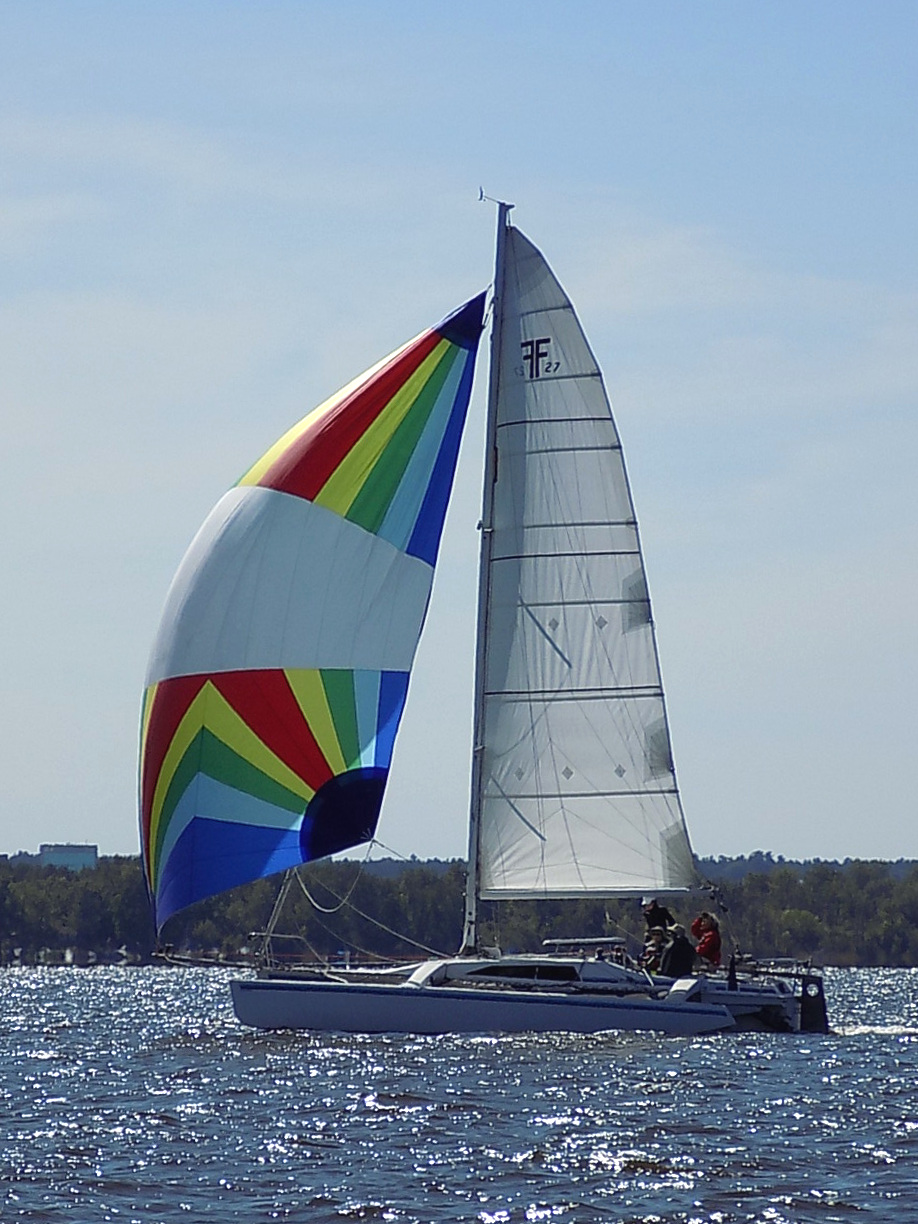
F-27 Sport Cruiser

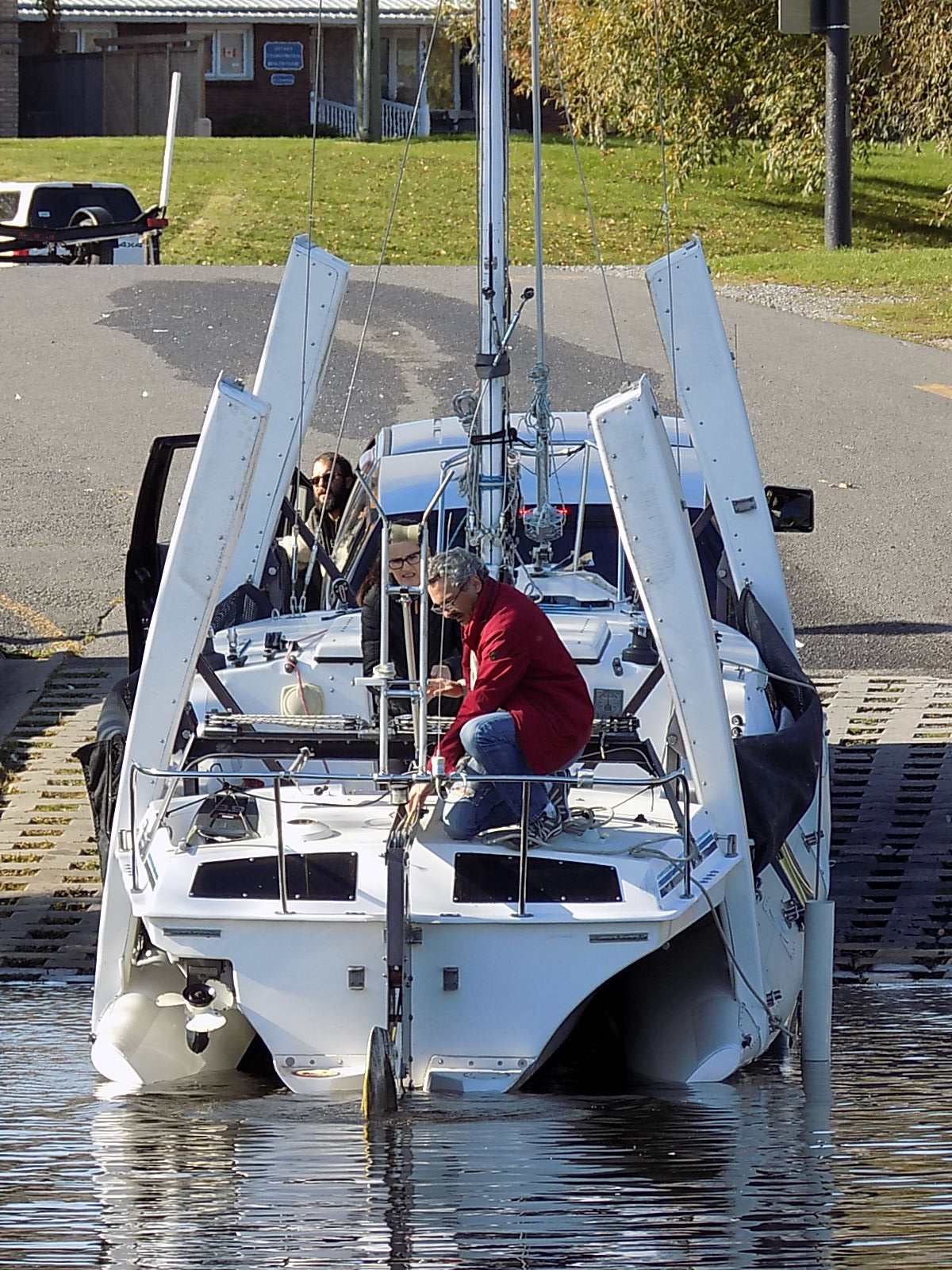
A Corsair F-27 Sport Cruiser is loaded onto a trailer on a boat ramp, with its pontoons folded.

The F-27's concept started in 1973 in Australia when Farrier developed and patented the outrigger folding system that made the design possible. Ten years later Wal-Mart heir John T. Walton approached Farrier about designing a boat and setting up production in the United States. Farrier agreed to take on the project on the condition that he had control of all aspects of the enterprise from design to production. Walton agreed and so Farrier moved his family to the US in March 1984 and started work in the position of Vice President. A location was found in Chula Vista, near San Diego, California and Corsair Marine was established.

Corsair started with the construction of the fiberglass molds to complete the prototype F-27. The prototype was completed and launched in May 1985. It was named Superfox in honor of Farrier's previous boat, a Tramp 19 named Flying Fox. The prototype was successful and production molds were built. The factory was relocated to larger facilities in the same neighborhood, this time with 10,000 sq ft (930 m^{2}) of floor space.

Over the first few years, new production techniques, such as vacuum bag moulding, were introduced that increased efficiency and allowed more boats to be produced. In 1987 the factory was expanded to 27,000 sq ft (2,500 m^{2}), by leasing the existing second half of the building and putting in an intervening door. In 1986 six boats were produced. This increased to 12 in 1987 and 33 in 1988. In 1989 the 100th boat was completed. A production peak was achieved in 1991, with 101 boats completed.

Farrier left the company in 1991, conflicting with Walton over "growing concerns about company directions", but having established production and wishing to move back to Australia to work on his F-31 Sport Cruiser design. He re-established connections with the company once Corsair had been sold to Paul Koch in 1994, but severed all ties in 2000. Farrier described the relationship between himself and Corsair as "disappointing", but added "however, this takes nothing away from the F-27 and our joint achievements".

== Design ==
The F-27 is a small recreational trimaran, built predominantly of carbon-fiber-reinforced polymer, fiberglass, Kevlar and foam. It has a fractional sloop rig, a transom-hung rudder and a daggerboard keel. It displaces 2,600 lb (1,179 kg).

All variants of the boat have a draft of 4.92 ft (1.50 m) with the centerboard extended and 1.17 ft (0.36 m) with it retracted, allowing beaching or ground transportation on a trailer.

The boat is normally fitted with a small outboard motor located in an aft deck well, for docking and maneuvering.

The F-27 has a hull speed of 6.87 kn (12.72 km/h).

== Variants ==
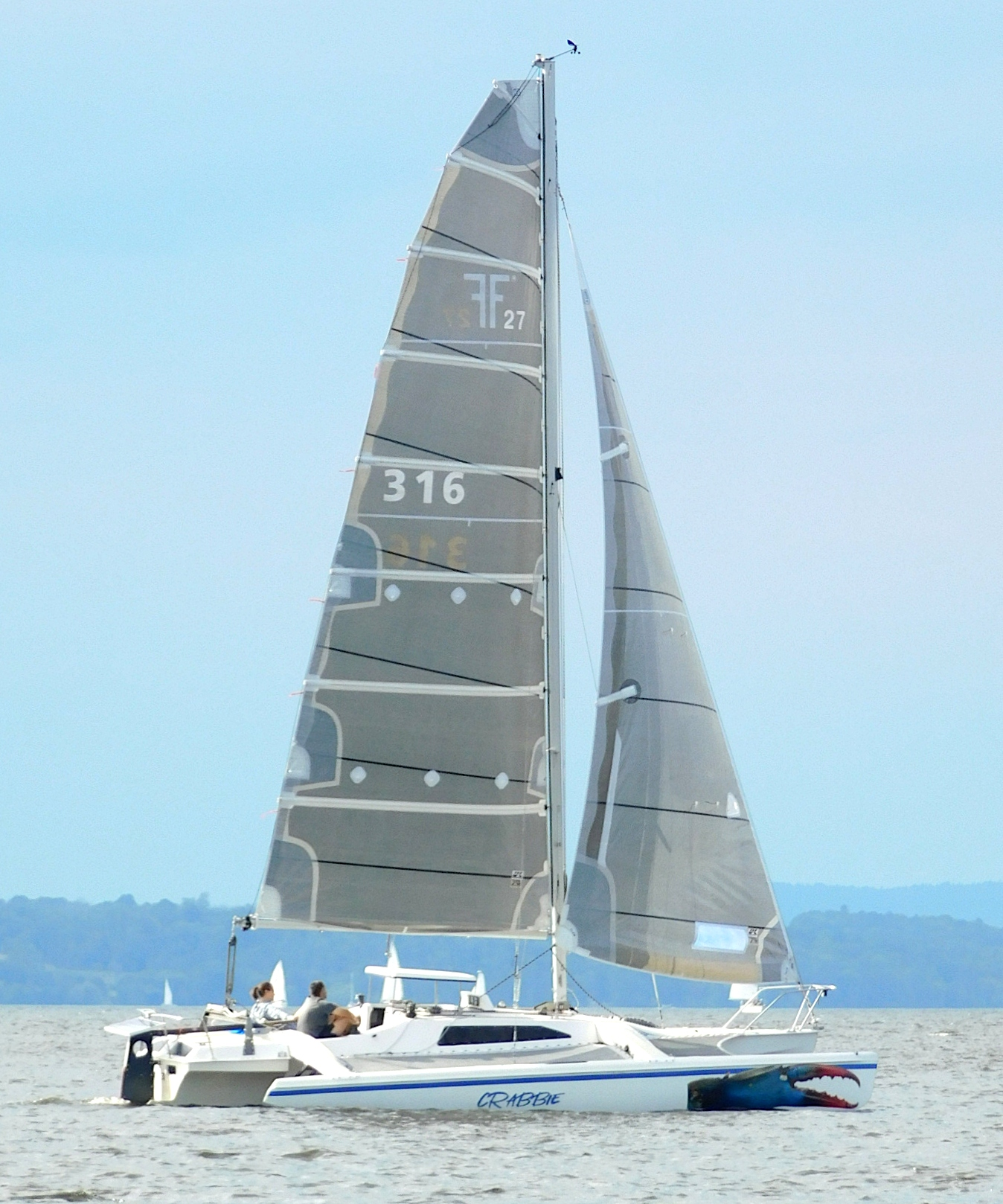
F-27 Sport Cruiser

F-27 Sport Cruiser
This model was designed by Ian Farrier and commercially introduced in 1986 after the prototype first sailed in May 1985. It has a length overall of 27.08 ft (8.3 m), a waterline length of 26.25 ft (8.0 m), displaces 2,600 lb (1,179 kg).
Corsair 27
This model was designed by Ian Farrier and built between 1986 and 1997, until replaced in production by the F-28. It has a non-rotating mast, a length overall of 27.00 ft (8.2 m), a waterline length of 26.25 ft (8.0 m), displaces 2,690 lb (1,220 kg). The fuel tank holds 4 U.S. gallons (15 L; 3.3 imp gal) and the fresh water tank has a capacity of 18 U.S. gallons (68 L; 15 imp gal). It has a spinnaker of 775 sq ft (72.0 m^{2}).
F-28 and Corsair 28
This model was designed by Ian Farrier and introduced in February 1997, it was later re-designated as the Corsair 28 in 2001. It was built using the same molds as the F-27. It has a length overall of 28.52 ft (8.7 m), a waterline length of 26.25 ft (8.0 m), displaces 2,690 lb (1,220 kg). It has an asymmetrical spinnaker of 780 sq ft (72 m^{2}) and a screacher of 358 sq ft (33.3 m^{2}).
Corsair 28R and RS
Corsair 28 with a rotating mast and bow sprit both made from carbon fiber.
Corsair 28CC
Corsair 28 with a center cockpit.

== Operational history ==
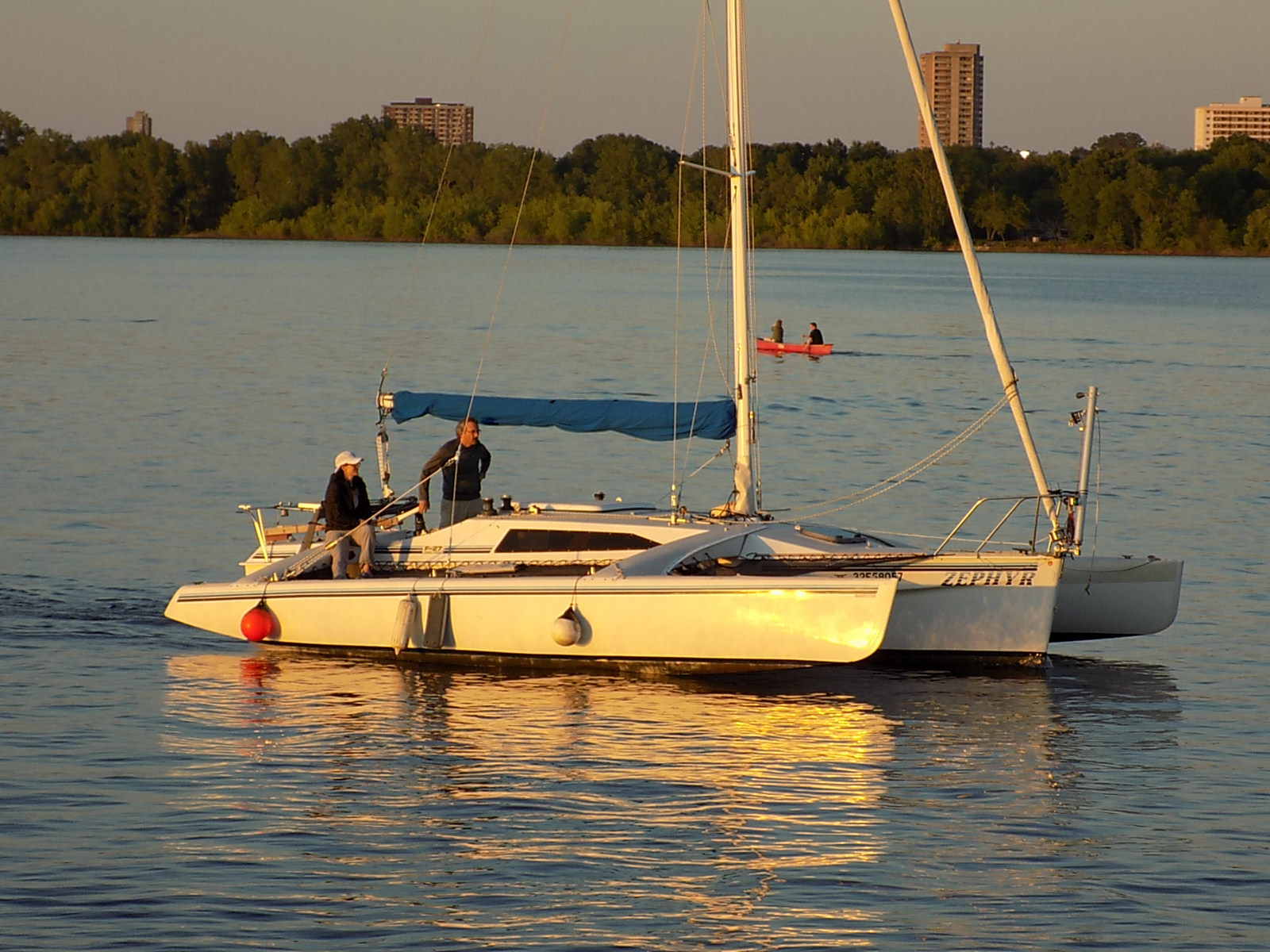
Corsair F-27 Sport Cruiser

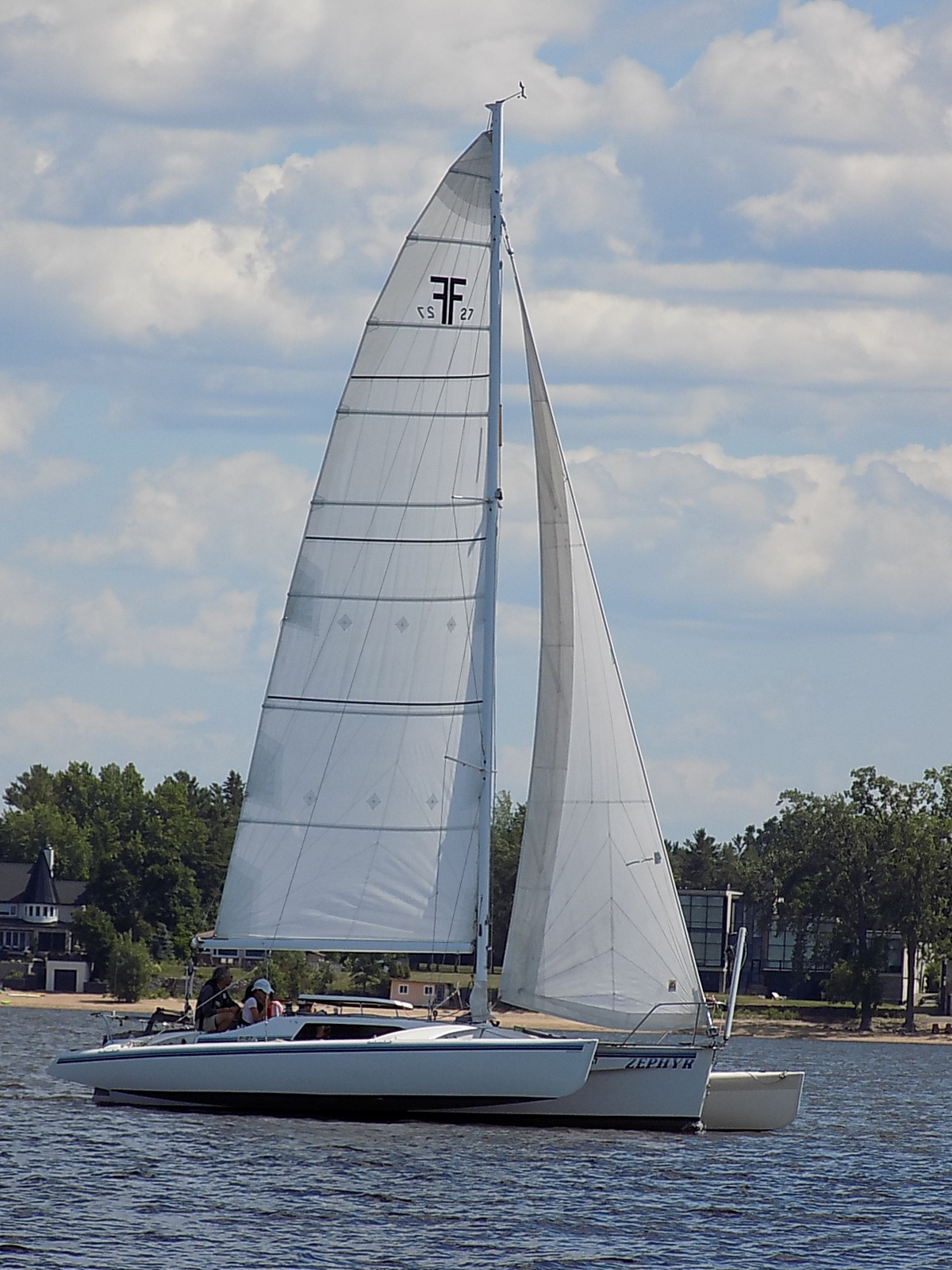
Corsair F-27 Sport Cruiser

The prototype F-27, Super Fox, was first raced by a two-man crew, consisting of Farrier and factory worker Corky Perry, in the 1985 Two Man Around Catalina Race and won the race based on handicap, setting the course record. The boat started last, but passed the entire monohull fleet on the first windward leg in 20 to 25 kn (37 to 46 km/h) winds. The boat also won the 1986 race in very light winds, crewed by Farrier and John Walton.

The first F-27 ocean crossing was part of the 1987 Trans Pac Race from Long Beach, California to Hawaii. It was completed by the F-27 Killer Frog, owned and sailed by Mark Robson, with John Walton as crew. The boat averaged 8 kn (15 km/h) during the 12 day voyage. It covered 250 mi (402 km) on one day of the race.

The first Atlantic Ocean crossing was made by an F-27 named Olijfe, owned by Adrian Went. It sailed from Cape Cod to the Netherlands via England in 23 days.

In 1990 two F-27s were sailed from the US mainland to Hawaii, one single-handedly.

Also in 1990, the Australian Multihull Offshore Championships, was won by the F-27 Aquatec, becoming the first trailerable multihull sailboat to win the seven-race series.

In August 1990, F-27s became the first multihull sailboats invited to compete in the National Offshore One Design Regatta held at Newport, Rhode Island.

The second Atlantic crossing in an F-27 was in June 1991, by Dr. Werner Stolz and Roswitha Schadt.

Farrier wrote, "While it is nice to know that the F-27 is seaworthy enough to cross oceans, it is a little small for this, and ocean crossing is not a recommended purpose."

Two F-27s sailed in the 1993 Miami-Key Largo race, averaging 18.2 kn (33.7 km/h) and 17.9 kn (33.2 km/h) over the 43 mi (69 km) race course.

In January 1995 Sail magazine named the F-27 as one of several boat designs that "had a significant and positive impact on sailing over the past 25 years".

The F-27 was inducted into the American Sailboat Hall of Fame on 29 January 2004.

In 2016, Sailing magazine's technical editor Bob Perry described the F-27 as "a great boat".

== See also ==
- List of sailing boat types
- List of multihulls

Related development

- F-31 Sport Cruiser

Similar sailboats

- Stiletto 27
