= F27 =

F27 or F-27 may refer to:

- F-27 Sport Cruiser, a trimaran sailboat design
- Fokker F27 Friendship, a 1955 Dutch turboprop airliner
  - Fairchild F-27, a 1958 American variant of the turboprop airliner
- HMS Lynx (F27), a 1955 British Royal Navy Leopard-class Type 41 anti aircraft frigate
- Fluorine-27 (F-27 or ^{27}F), an isotope of fluorine
