= Topaz Taz =

Type of dinghy

Development
- Designer: Ian Howlett
- Name: Topaz Taz

Boat
- Crew: 1–2

Hull
- Type: Monohull
- Construction: Topaz TRILAM
- Hull weight: 40 kg (88 lb)
- LOA: 2.95 m (9 ft 8 in)
- Beam: 1.20 m (3 ft 11 in)

Hull appendages
- Keel: Daggerboard

Sails
- Mainsail area: 5.39 m^{2} (58.0 sq ft)
- Jib/genoa area: 4.39 m^{2} (47.3 sq ft)

Racing
- RYA PN: 1500/1550

The Topaz Taz is a sailing dinghy created by Topper International designed for between 1 or 2 children. The Taz is an ISAF ‘Learn to Sail’ class.

== Performance and design ==
The Taz is an easy to sail, two-sail dinghy designed for one or two children (or an adult and a child). Designed by Ian Howlett, the Taz is built with a trilam construction with a choice of a dacron or mylar sail.
