= Phantom 14 =

Sailboat class

Development
- Designer: Jack Howie
- Location: United States
- Year: 1977
- No. built: 9,000
- Builder: Howmar Boats
- Role: Racer
- Name: Phantom 14

Boat
- Displacement: 120 lb (54 kg)
- Draft: 2.83 ft (0.86 m) with daggerboard down

Hull
- Type: Monohull
- Construction: Fiberglass
- LOA: 14.21 ft (4.33 m)
- LWL: 10.50 ft (3.20 m)
- Beam: 4.42 ft (1.35 m)

Hull appendages
- Keel: daggerboard
- Rudder: transom-mounted rudder

Rig
- Rig type: Lateen rig

Sails
- Sailplan: Lateen
- Mainsail area: 84.50 sq ft (7.850 m^{2})
- Total sail area: 84.50 sq ft (7.850 m^{2})

Racing
- D-PN: 103.7

The Phantom 14 is an American sailing dinghy that was designed by Jack Howie as a racer and first built in 1977. It is a board sailboat, similar to the Sunfish.

== Production ==
The design was built by Howmar Boats in Edison, New Jersey, United States from 1977 until the company went out of business in 1983. A total of 9,000 boats were completed, but it is now out of production.

== Design ==
The Phantom 14 is a recreational sailboat, built predominantly of fiberglass. It has a Lateen rig, a raked stem, a vertical transom, a transom-hung rudder controlled by a tiller and a retractable daggerboard. It displaces 120 lb (54 kg).

The boat has a draft of 2.83 ft (0.86 m) with the daggerboard extended and 0.31 ft (0.094 m) with it retracted, allowing beaching or ground transportation on a trailer or car roof rack.

The design uses sail sleeves, with the hard-coated aluminum spars inserted into the sleeves to rig the boat. This results in less aerodynamic drag and creates an even sail shape. The boat is equipped with hiking straps and has a storage compartment in the cockpit. The hull has a high bow design and molded in coaming to reduce the submarining of the bow that is common with "board boats". The sail halyard is routed through the coaming.

The design has a Portsmouth Yardstick racing average handicap of 103.7 (suspect) and is normally raced by one sailor.

== See also ==
- List of sailing boat types
- DC‐14 Phantom - a boat with a similar name
- Phantom (dinghy) - a catboat with a similar name
- Phantom 14 (catamaran) - a boat with the same name
- Phantom 16 (catamaran) - a boat with a similar name

Similar sailboats

- Dolphin 15 Senior
- Sunfish (sailboat)
