= DC-14 Phantom =

Sailboat class

DC‐14 Phantom
- DC-14 P Class symbol

Development
- Designer: MacLear & Harris
- Location: United States
- Year: 1964
- Builder: Duncan Sutphen Inc.
- Role: Sailing dinghy
- Name: DC‐14 Phantom

Boat
- Displacement: 350 lb (159 kg)
- Draft: 2.18 ft (0.66 m) with the daggerboards down

Hull
- Type: Catamaran
- Construction: Fiberglass
- LOA: 14.18 ft (4.32 m)
- Beam: 6.67 ft (2.03 m)

Hull appendages
- Keel: dual daggerboards
- Rudder: dual transom-mounted rudders

Rig
- Rig type: Bermuda rig

Sails
- Sailplan: Fractional rigged sloop
- Total sail area: 140.00 sq ft (13.006 m^{2})

The DC‐14 Phantom is an American catamaran sailing dinghy that was designed by MacLear & Harris and first built in 1964.

== Production ==
The design was built by Duncan Sutphen Inc. in the United States, but it is now out of production.

== Design ==
The DC‐14 Phantom is a recreational sailboat, with its hulls built predominantly of fiberglass. It has a fractional sloop rig with a rotating mast. The hulls have raked stems, vertical transoms, dual transom-hung, kick-up rudders controlled by a tiller and retractable daggerboards. The boat displaces 350 lb (159 kg) and has a central trampoline, stretched over a frame that mounts the hulls.

The boat has a draft of 2.18 ft (0.66 m) with the daggerboards extended and 6 in (15 cm) with them retracted, allowing beaching or ground transportation on a trailer. For transport or storage the hulls can be detached from the trampoline frame.

== See also ==
- List of sailing boat types
- List of multihulls

Similar sailboats

- Phantom 14 - an American lateen-rigged sailboat design, with a similar name
- Phantom 14 (catamaran) - an Italian sailboat design, with a similar name
- Phantom 16 (catamaran) - an Italian sailboat design, with a similar name
- Phantom (dinghy) - a British catboat design, with a similar name
