= Farrier F-24 =

Sailboat class

- ꟻF24

Development
- Designer: Ian Farrier
- Location: United States
- Year: 1992
- Builder: Corsair Marine
- Role: Racer-Cruiser
- Name: Farrier F-24

Boat
- Displacement: 1,800 lb (816 kg)
- Draft: 4.67 ft (1.42 m) with daggerboard down

Hull
- Type: trimaran
- Construction: fiberglass
- LOA: 24.17 ft (7.37 m)
- LWL: 23.58 ft (7.19 m)
- Beam: 17.92 ft (5.46 m)
- Engine: outboard motor

Hull appendages
- Keel: daggerboard
- Rudder: transom-mounted rudder

Rig
- Rig type: Bermuda rig
- I foretriangle height: 31.20 ft (9.51 m)
- J foretriangle base: 7.52 ft (2.29 m)
- P mainsail luff: 29.50 ft (8.99 m)
- E mainsail foot: 10.50 ft (3.20 m)

Sails
- Sailplan: fractional rigged sloop
- Mainsail area: 154.88 sq ft (14.389 m^{2})
- Jib/genoa area: 117.31 sq ft (10.898 m^{2})
- Total sail area: 272.19 sq ft (25.287 m^{2})

The Farrier F-24, also called the Corsair F-24, is an American trailerable trimaran that was designed by Ian Farrier as a racer-cruiser and first built in 1991.

The Farrier F-24 design was developed into the Corsair 24 Mark II, also called the F-24 Mark II, in 1994, and the F-24 Sport Cruiser in 1994.

== Production ==
The design was built by Corsair Marine in the United States, from 1991 to 1994, but it is now out of production.

== Design ==
The Farrier F-24 is a recreational sailboat, built predominantly of fiberglass. It has a fractional sloop rig with a rotating mast. The hull and outriggers have nearly plumb stems and reverse transoms. The hull has a transom-hung rudder controlled by a tiller and a retractable daggerboard. It displaces 1,800 lb (816 kg) and carries no ballast.

The beam is 17.92 ft (5.46 m) with the outriggers deployed and 8.17 ft (2.49 m) them folded.

The boat has a draft of 4.67 ft (1.42 m) with the daggerboard extended and 12 in (30 cm) with it retracted, allowing operation in shallow water, beaching or ground transportation on a trailer.

The design has a hull speed of 6.51 kn (12.06 km/h).

== See also ==
- List of sailing boat types

Related development

- Farrier F-22
