= F-31 Sport Cruiser =

Sailboat class

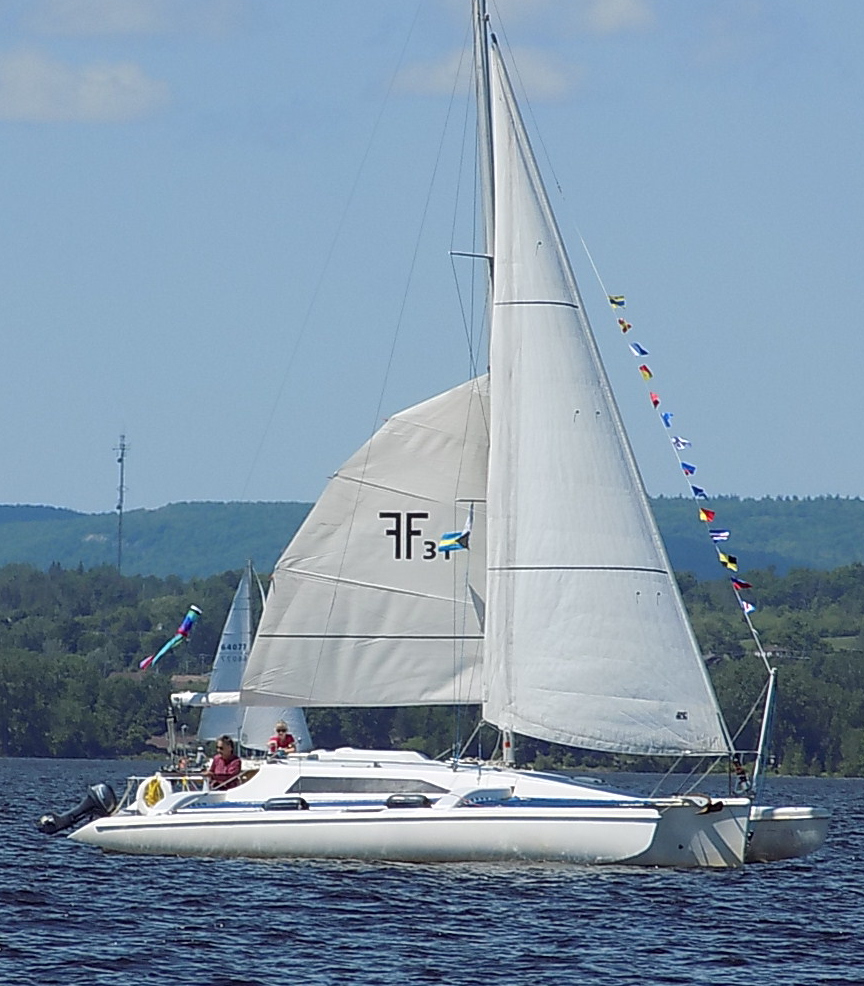
- F-31 with mainsail reefed

Development
- Designer: Ian Farrier
- Location: United States
- Year: 1991
- Builder: Corsair Marine
- Name: F-31 Sport Cruiser

Boat
- Displacement: 3,630 lb (1,647 kg)
- Draft: 5.50 ft (1.68 m) with daggerboard down

Hull
- Type: Trimaran
- Construction: Fiberglass
- LOA: 30.83 ft (9.40 m)
- LWL: 30.00 ft (9.14 m)
- Beam: 22.42 ft (6.83 m)
- Engine: Outboard motor

Hull appendages
- Keel: daggerboard
- Rudder: internally-mounted spade-type rudder

Rig
- Rig type: Bermuda rig

Sails
- Sailplan: Fractional rigged sloop
- Total sail area: 599 sq ft (55.6 m^{2})

The F-31 Sport Cruiser is a family of American trailerable trimaran sailboats that was designed by New Zealander Ian Farrier and first built in 1991.

The F-31 is the production development of the Farrier F-9, which were built by custom shops in small numbers and by amateur builders from plans. The first F-9 prototype was launched on 29 September 1991.

== Production ==
The boats were built by Corsair Marine in the United States, starting in 1991, but are now out of production.

== Design ==
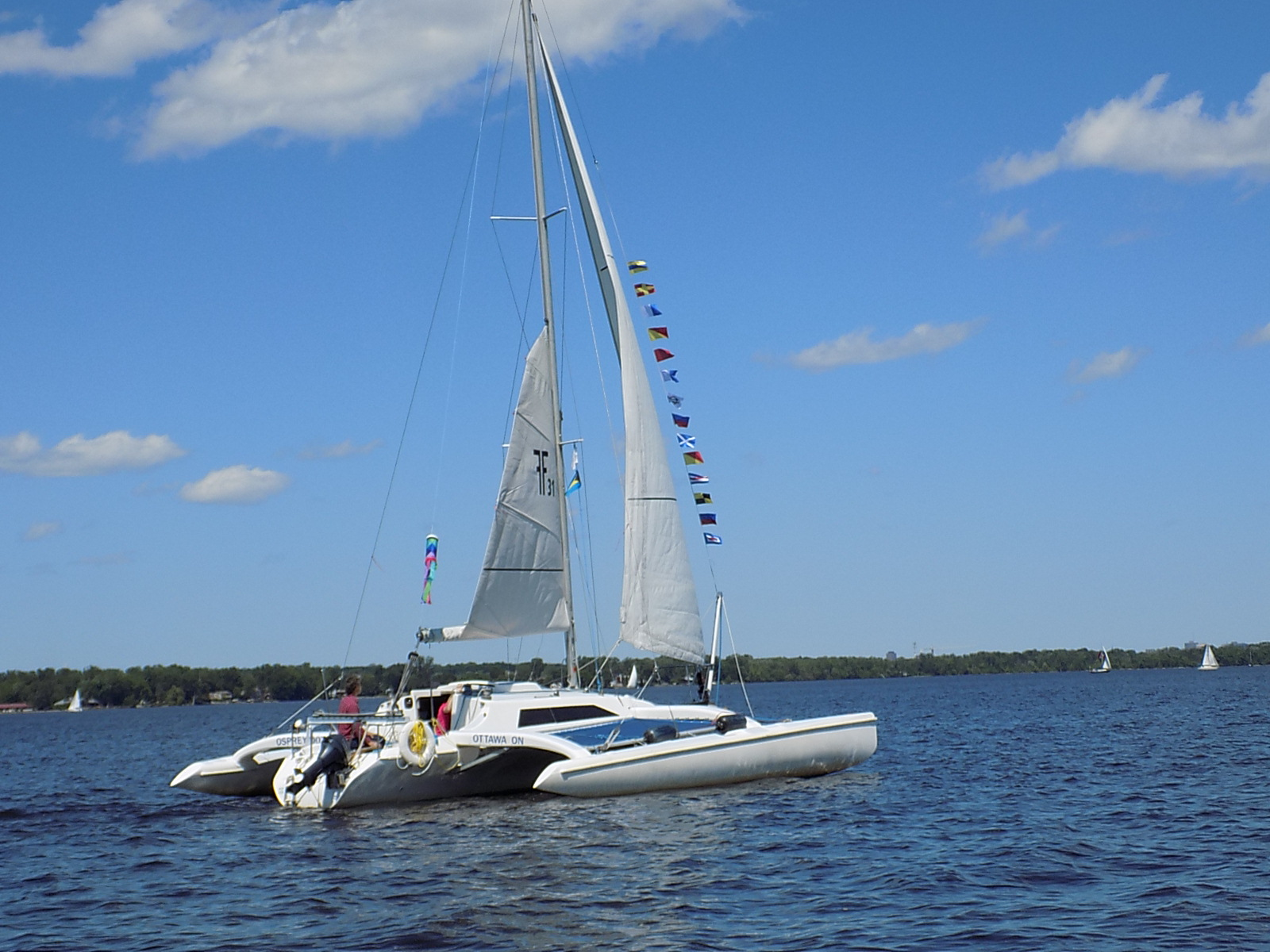
F-31

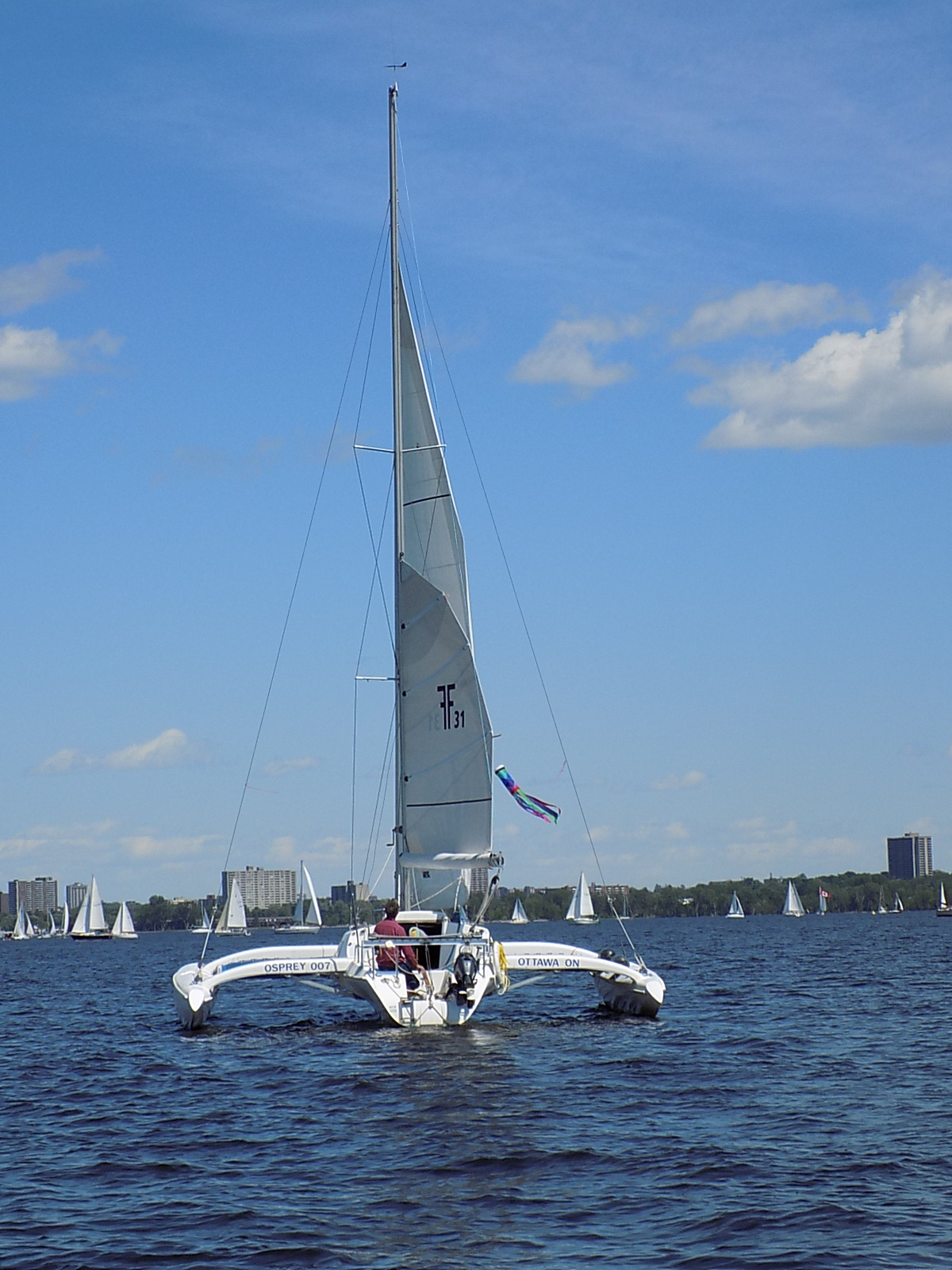
F-31

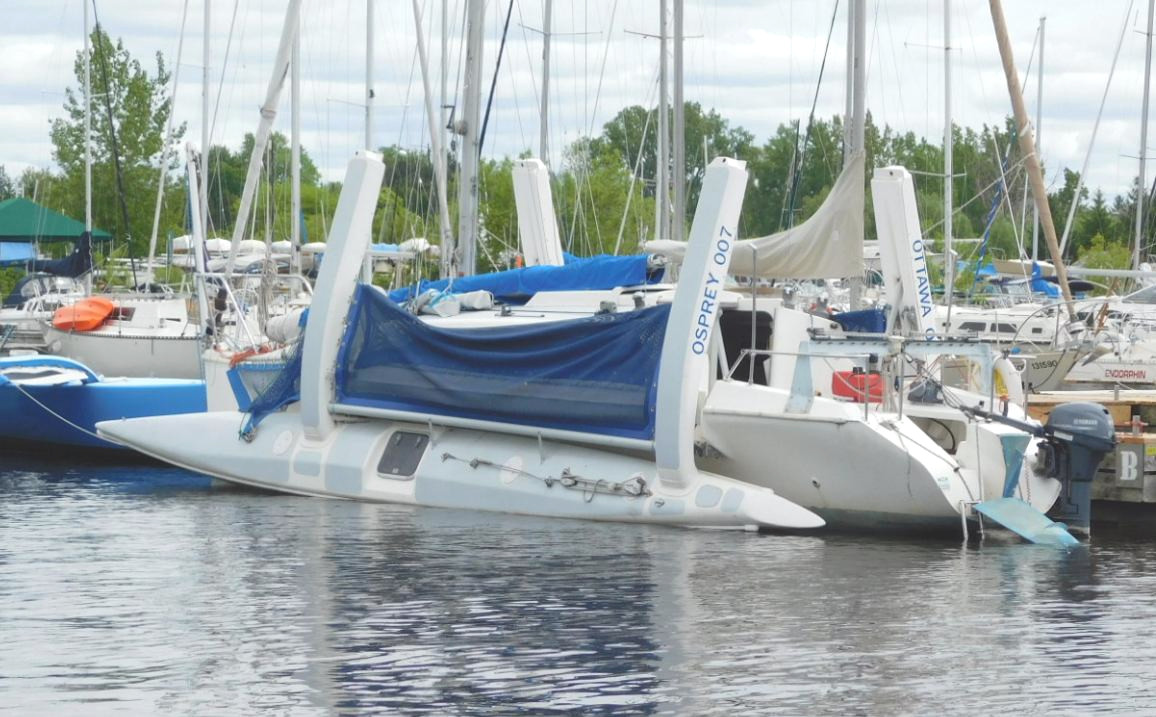
Corsair F31 with its outriggers folded

The F-31 is a small recreational trimaran, built predominantly of fiberglass. The hull is constructed with a rigid PVC foam core, vacuum bagged moulded to the skins, while the structural beams are reinforced with carbon fiber.

It has a fractional sloop rig, a plumb stem, a reverse transom, an internally-mounted spade-type rudder controlled by a tiller and a retractable daggerboard, mounted at 18°, with the daggerboard trunk stepping the mast. The outrigger floats are folding for storage or ground transportation on a trailer, with a maximum width of under eight feet for highway transport. The outrigger floats fold into cutouts in the lower hull to reduce trailering width. When deployed the outriggers are set at a fixed 8° to the hull, so that they are upright and thus symmetrical, when each is in the water. Due to the employment of a daggerboard, the design can easily be beached.

The boat is normally fitted with a small outboard motor of typically 9.9 to 15 hp (7 to 11 kW) for docking and maneuvering.

== Operational history ==
In 1992 the F-31 was named the Australian Sailboat of the Year. In April 1992 Fred Gan's F-31 Ostac Triumph won the bi-annual Australian Offshore Multihull Championships. In the associated Brisbane to Gladstone Ocean Race, Bobsled, a 67-foot, million dollar, racing monohull boat, sponsored by Société Générale, made headlines in breaking the monohull record by an impressive hour and a half. The trailerable F-31 caught and passed Bobsled, finishing an hour and fifteen minutes ahead.

In a 2000 review, writer Bob Perry of Sailing Magazine wrote of the F-31, "In looking at the accommodations, it would be better not to compare this design to a monohull with a similar LOA but, instead, to compare displacements. There is no question that the 31-foot Farrier tri has less interior volume than a standard 31-foot monohull, but you cannot trail[er] most 31-foot monohulls. The F-31 has comfortable accommodations for two couples, and boat speed that will blow the doors off a 31-foot monohull...Ian designs handsome boats. The F-31 is no exception... Just be aware that this 31-footer is capable of sailing with some big monohulls."

== Variants ==
F-9A
The initial F-9, designed for amateur construction from plans. More than 300 completed.
F-9AX
A version of the F-9A with expanded interior space, with a 15% wider center hull for more room and a 16% higher load capacity. Trailering beam was also increased to 2.9 m (9.5 ft).
F-9R
A high performance racing version of the F-9A with a rotating mast.
F-31 Sport Cruiser
This model was designed by Ian Farrier and built by Corsair Marine. It improved over the F-9 in having a smaller folded width for trailering of under 8 ft (2.4 m). It has a length overall of 30.83 ft (9.4 m), a waterline length of 30.00 ft (9.1 m) and displaces 3,630 lb (1,647 kg). The boat has a draft of 5.50 ft (1.68 m) with the daggerboards down and 1.67 ft (0.51 m) with the daggerboards up. The fresh water tank has a capacity of 20 U.S. gallons (76 L; 17 imp gal). The boat has a hull speed of 7.34 kn (13.59 km/h).
Corsair 31
This model was designed by Ian Farrier and built by Corsair Marine. After Corsair and Ian Farrier ended their business relationship in 2000, Corsair continued to develop the F-31's design and renamed the modified design the Corsair 31. It has a length overall of 30.83 ft (9.4 m), a waterline length of 30.00 ft (9.1 m) and displaces 4,600 lb (2,087 kg). The boat has a draft of 5.50 ft (1.68 m) with the daggerboards down and 1.33 ft (0.41 m) with the daggerboards up. Options included a racing package, with a bowsprit and carbon fiber spars. It was built in an aft-cockpit and center-cockpit version. It has a hull speed of 7.34 kn (13.59 km/h).

== See also ==
- List of sailing boat types
- List of multihulls

Related development

- F-27 Sport Cruiser
