= Farrier F-22 =

Sailboat class

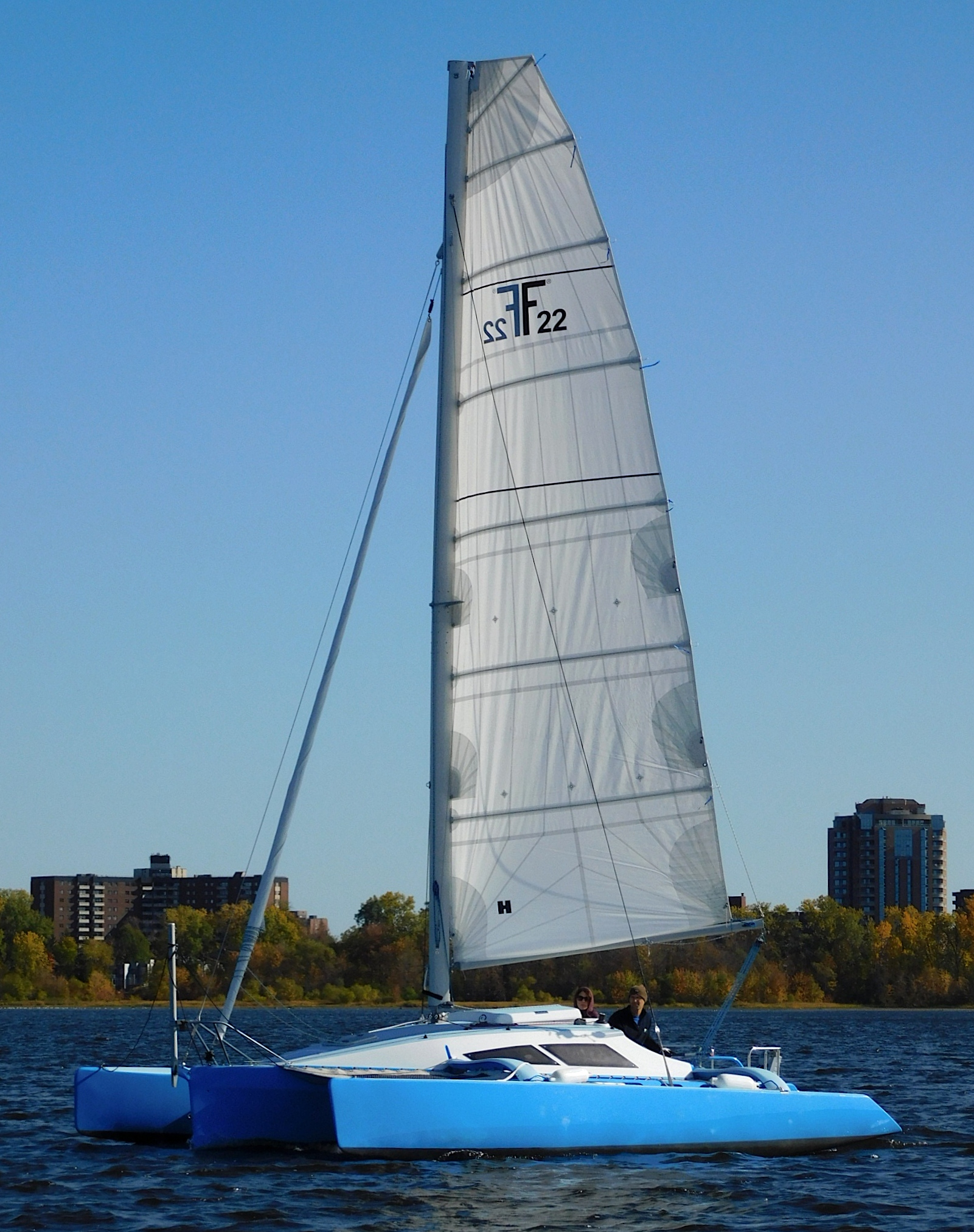
- Farrier F-22A
- ꟻF22

Development
- Designer: Ian Farrier
- Location: New Zealand
- Year: 2014
- Builder: Farrier Marine
- Name: Farrier F-22

Boat
- Displacement: 1,300 lb (590 kg)
- Draft: 4.92 ft (1.50 m), daggerboard down

Hull
- General: Main hull and two outrigger floats
- Type: Trimaran
- Construction: Fiberglass
- LOA: 22.92 ft (6.99 m)
- LWL: 22.25 ft (6.78 m)
- Beam: 18.08 ft (5.51 m)
- Engine: Outboard motor

Hull appendages
- Keel: daggerboard
- Ballast: none
- Rudder: transom-mounted rudder

Rig
- Rig type: Bermuda rig

Sails
- Sailplan: Fractional rigged sloop Masthead sloop
- Total sail area: 328 sq ft (30.5 m^{2})

The Farrier F-22 is a New Zealand trailerable trimaran sailboat that was designed by Ian Farrier and first built in 2014.

== Production ==
The design is built by Farrier Marine in New Zealand and was in production as of 2019.

== Design ==
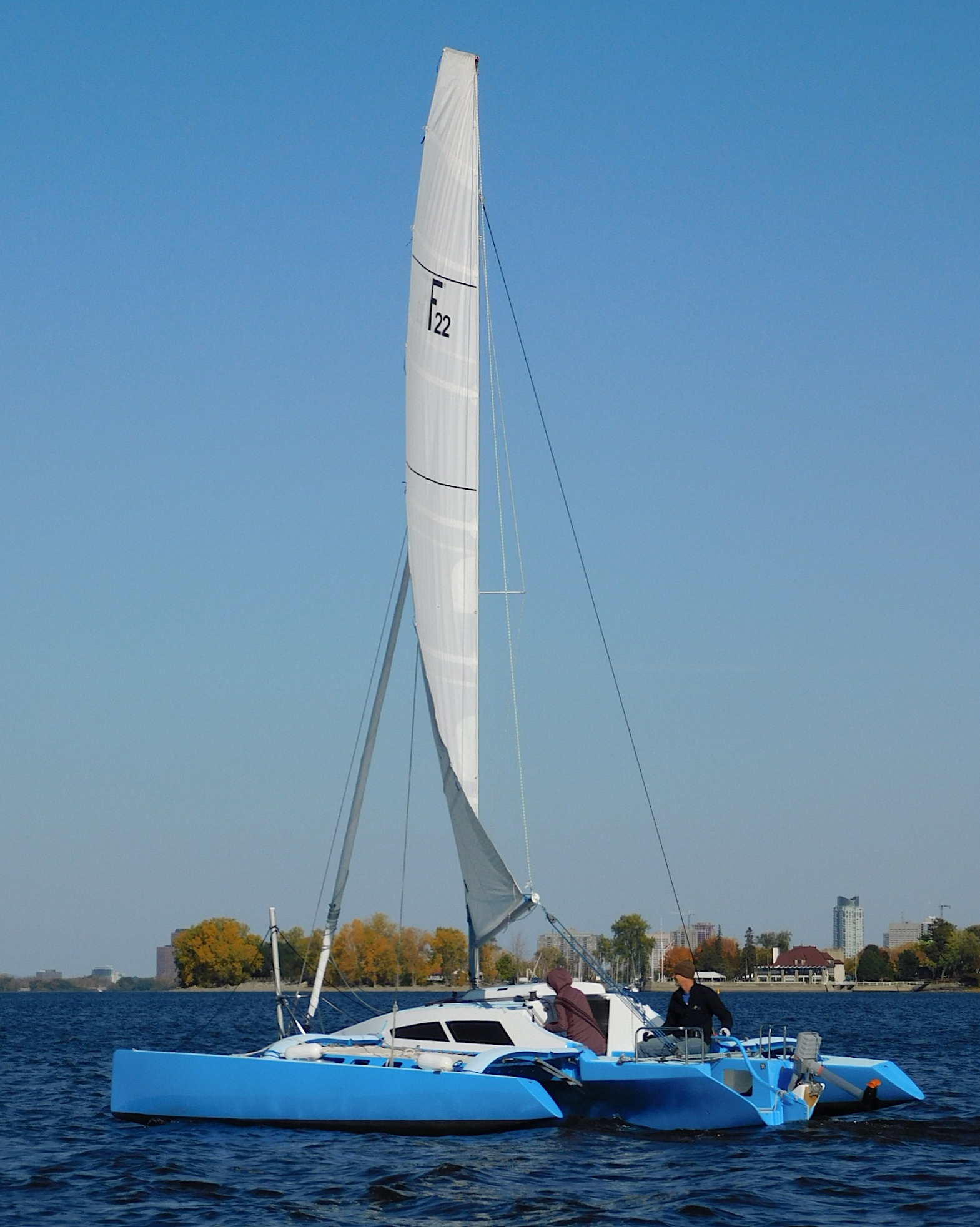
Farrier F-22A

The Farrier F-22 is a recreational trimaran, built predominantly of fiberglass with a foam core. It has a fractional sloop rig, with a rotating mast, plumb stems, reverse transoms, a main hull transom-hung rudder controlled by a tiller and a daggerboard or optional centreboard. It has a bare weight of 1,300 to 1,500 lb (590 to 680 kg) and has a float displacement of 3,078 lb (1,396 kg).

The main hull has a self-draining, open transom.

The boat has a draft of 4.92 ft (1.50 m) with the daggerboard extended and 1.00 ft (0.30 m) with it retracted, allowing beaching or ground transportation on a trailer. The beam is 18.08 ft (5.51 m) with the hulls extended for sailing and 8.20 ft (2.50 m) with them retracted for ground transport or docking.

The cabin has 5.33 ft (1.62 m) of headroom, or 6.17 ft (1.88 m) with the optional pop-top installed and in the open position. The cabin is 7.17 ft (2.19 m) wide and has two settee berths and a forward "V"-berth. A modular alcohol-fire stove and a head are both optional

The boat is normally fitted with a small outboard motor for docking and maneuvering. It can be fitted with a spinnaker of 611 sq ft (56.8 m^{2}) or a screecher of 315 sq ft (29.3 m^{2}).

== Variants ==
Farrier F-22
Base model with an aluminum mast of 31.5 ft (9.6 m) for cruising. Built off-shore.
Farrier F-22S
Premium model, with an aluminum mast of 31.5 ft (9.6 m) for cruising, with options included, built in New Zealand.
Farrier F-22R
Racing model with a deeper rudder, a carbon fibre daggerboard and a carbon fibre mast of 35.4 ft (10.8 m) and simple, lighter interior. Built in New Zealand
Farrier F-22XR
Model for dedicated class racing, under development.

== Operational history ==
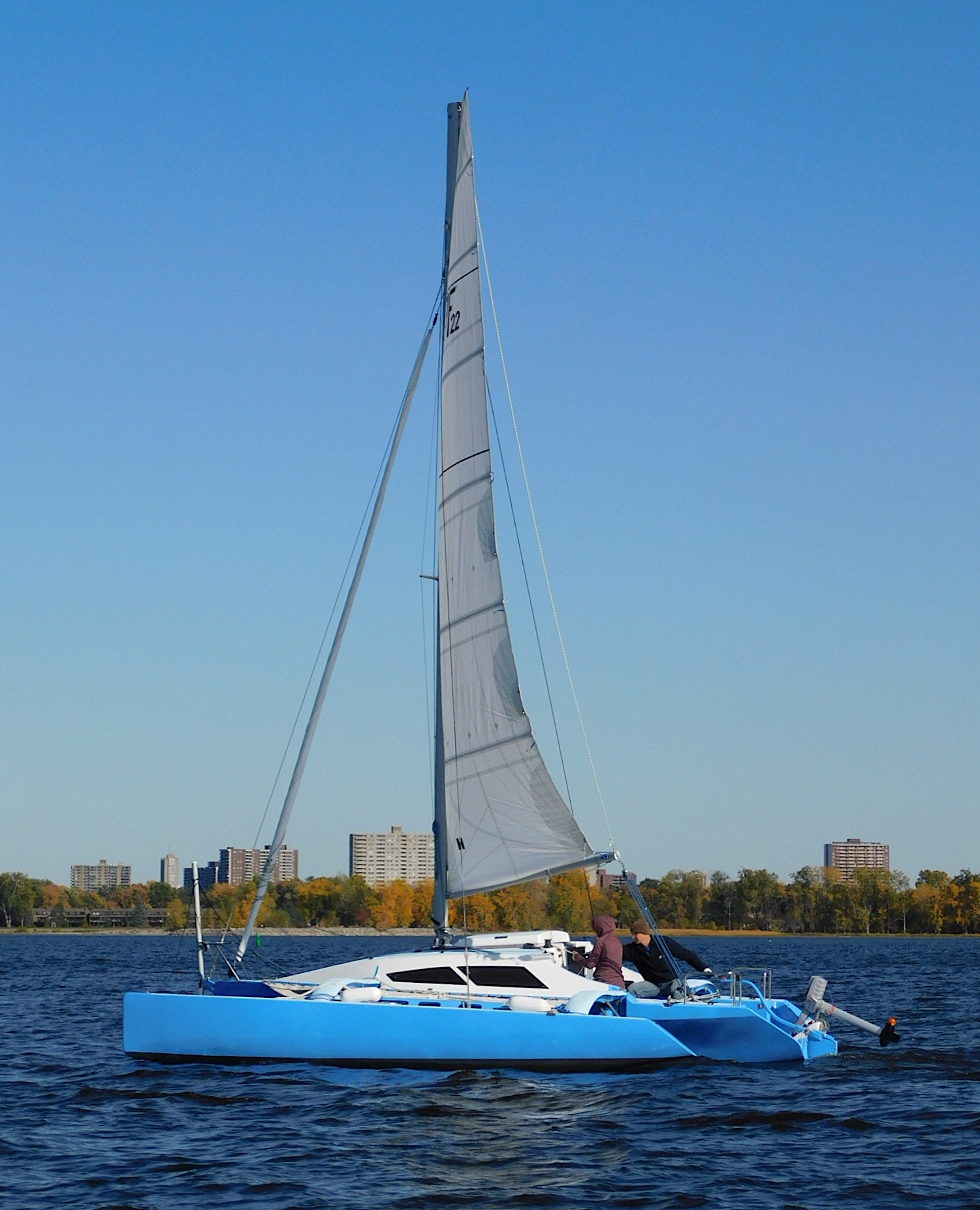
Farrier F-22A with Torqeedo electric outboard motor

The design was named Sail magazine's winner of the "Best Boats 2019".

Naval architect Robert Perry wrote a review in Sailing Magazine in 2017, praising the details, "there is a single, deep centerboard with a board-down draft of 4 feet 11 inches. The cassette-style rudder make beaching and trailering a breeze. Board- and rudder-up draft is 12 inches. Max beam is 18 feet 1 inch. Note the flat profile to the hull through the middle then it kicks up around station 8. The main hull has that typical inverted bell shape that provides volume where you need it for accommodations and a narrow BWL for speed. There is a very clever galley module that disappears into the seatback area when not being used. This would be camping-style cruising in the F-22 but it would make a great singlehander."

In a 2019 review in Sail, Adam Cort described sailing the design, "Under sail, in near perfect conditions, we easily hit 7.5 knots and occasionally just over 8 sailing hard on the wind in just 10 knots of breeze. Bearing away and unrolling the screecher our speed shot up to 10 then 11.5 knots, eventually touching 14 as we left a wake that would have made a Volvo Ocean Race veteran proud. Yeah, she’s fast. Better still, the helm remained responsive and nicely balanced throughout, while the boat’s amas offer sufficient buoyancy to ensure you don’t have to worry about burying the bows."

== See also ==
- List of sailing boat types

Related development

- Farrier F-24
