= Vacuum molding =

Vacuum molding most commonly refers to the metal casting process. It may also refer to:

- Vacuum forming, a plastic forming process
- Vacuum bag molding, a composite material forming process
