= Corsair 24 =

Sailboat class

Corsair 24 Mark II
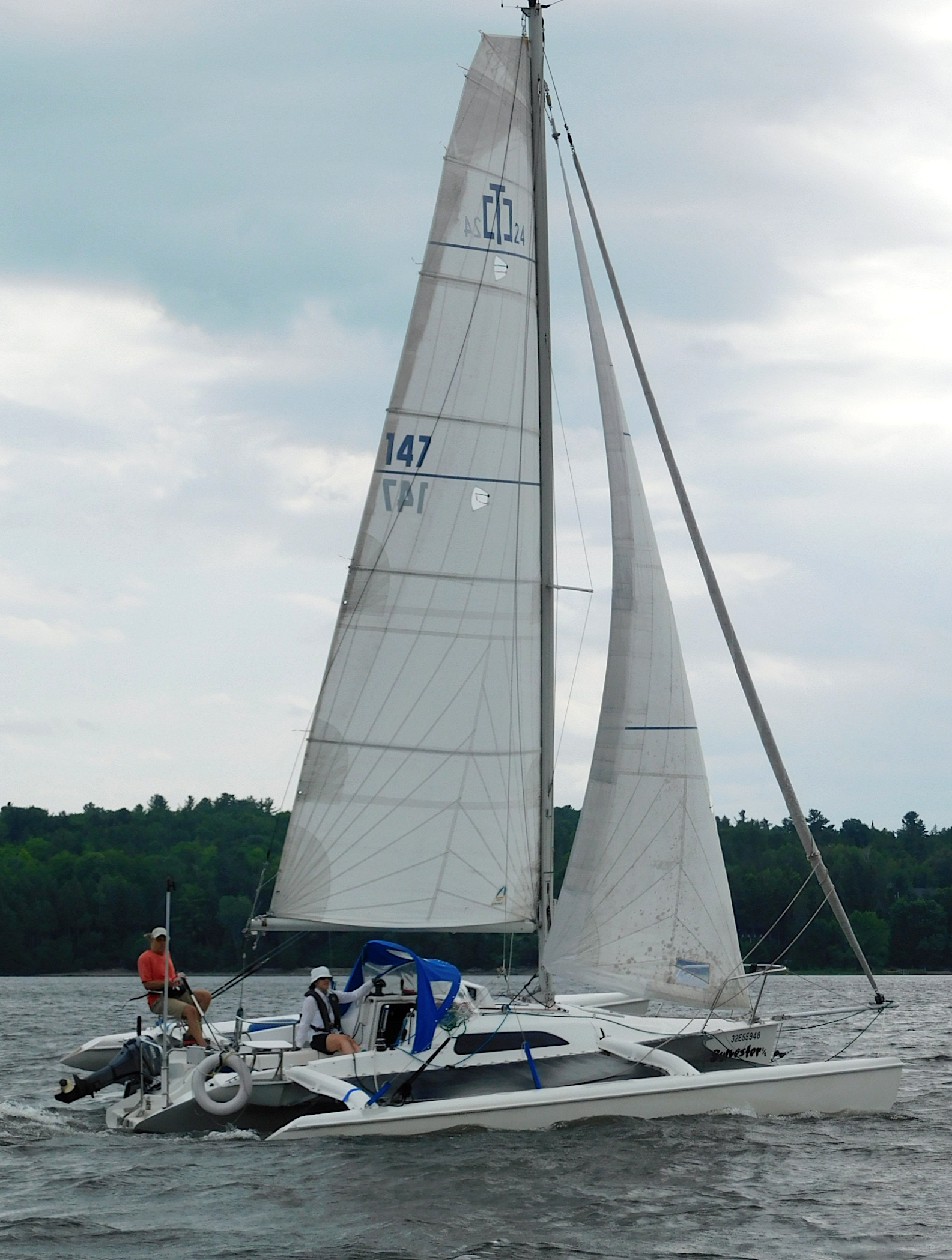
- Corsair 24 Mark I
- [T]24

Development
- Designer: Ian Farrier
- Location: United States
- Year: 1996
- No. built: 200
- Builder: Corsair Marine
- Role: Racer-Cruiser
- Name: Corsair 24 Mark II

Boat
- Displacement: 1,690 lb (767 kg)
- Draft: 5.00 ft (1.52 m) with daggerboard down

Hull
- Type: trimaran
- Construction: fiberglass
- LOA: 24.00 ft (7.32 m)
- LWL: 23.58 ft (7.19 m)
- Beam: 17.94 ft (5.47 m)
- Engine: outboard motor

Hull appendages
- Keel: daggerboard
- Rudder: transom-mounted rudder

Rig
- Rig type: Bermuda rig

Sails
- Sailplan: fractional rigged sloop
- Mainsail area: 243 sq ft (22.6 m^{2})
- Jib/genoa area: 122 sq ft (11.3 m^{2})
- Gennaker area: 570 sq ft (53 m^{2})
- Total sail area: 365.00 sq ft (33.910 m^{2})

The Corsair 24, also called the Corsair F-24, is an American trailerable sailboat that was designed by Ian Farrier as a racer-cruiser. The boat was produced in two versions, the centerboard-equipped Mark I and the daggerboard Mark II.

The Corsair 24 is a development of the Farrier F-24.

== Production ==
The design was built by Corsair Marine in the United States, starting in the early 1990s as the F-24. The name was changed to the Corsair 24 in 2000 when Farrier left the company and some minor changes made to the design. Production ran until 2003, with 200 Mark II boats completed, but it is now out of production.

== Design ==
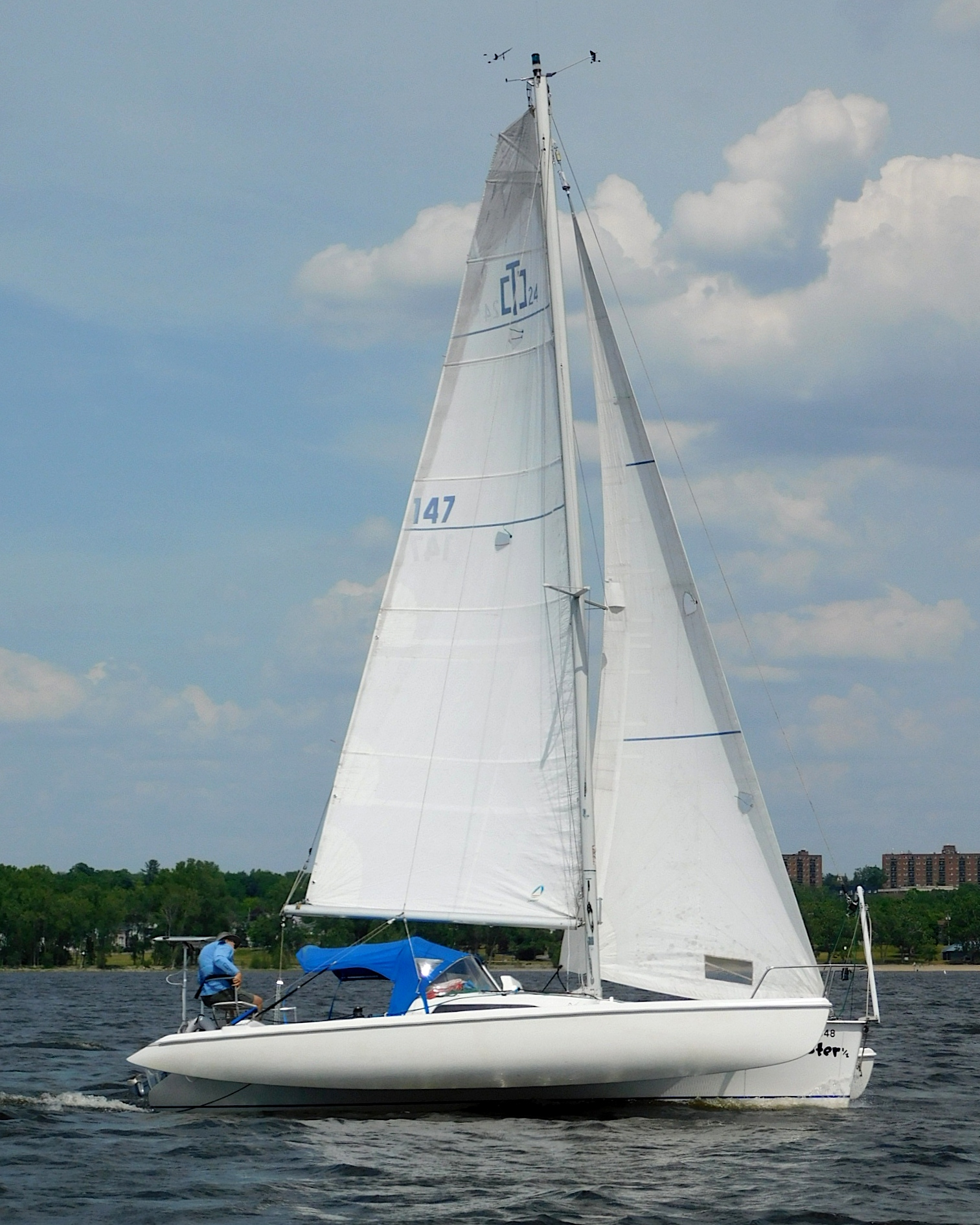
Corsair 24 Mark I

The Corsair 24 is a recreational trimaran, built predominantly of fiberglass with a fractional sloop rig and folding bowsprit. The hull and the folding outriggers have nearly-plumb stems and reverse transoms. The main hull mounts a transom-hung rudder controlled by a tiller with an extension. It has foam flotation to make it unsinkable. The boat is normally fitted with a small outboard motor for docking and maneuvering.

The design has sleeping accommodation for two adults and two children, with a small double "V"-berth in the bow cabin and quarter berths in the main cabin. A cabin "pop-top" adds some headroom when open. A galley is optional, as is the portable head. The cabin was described by Darrell Nicholson in a Practical Sailor review as "cramped and limited".

For sailing downwind the design may be equipped with an asymmetrical spinnaker of 570 sq ft (53 m^{2}).

The design has a hull speed of 6.51 kn (12.06 km/h).

The Mark I has a centerboard, a fixed mast and a displacement of 1,800 lb (816 kg).

The improved Mark II model has a daggerboard, a rotating mast and a displacement of 1,650 lb (748 kg). The Mark II has a draft of 5.00 ft (1.52 m) with the daggerboard down and 12 in (30 cm) with it retracted, allowing operation in shallow water, beaching or ground transportation on a trailer with the outriggers folded.

== Operational history ==
A 2018 review by Drew Frye in Practical Sailor said of the Mark I, "whether you’re downsizing from a cruising cat, or upsizing from the family Hobie, the F-24 offers the sports car of youthful dreams, on a budget. Is it worth paying three times as much as you would for a 24-foot mono-hull with more room? Not if you’re looking for cabin space and need an enclosed head. On the other hand, if fun sailing is the goal, the dollar-to-grin ratio is very high. Market demand is dependable and you will get your money back. It’s not the best beginners boat."

In a 2019 review for Practical Sailor, Darrell Nicholson described the Mark II as, "flat out fast and well built, but compared to a monohull (and you've heard this before), expensive and cramped down below."

== See also ==
- List of sailing boat types

Related development

- Farrier F-22
