= Solution (dinghy) =

Class of single handed hiking dinghies

- Class symbol

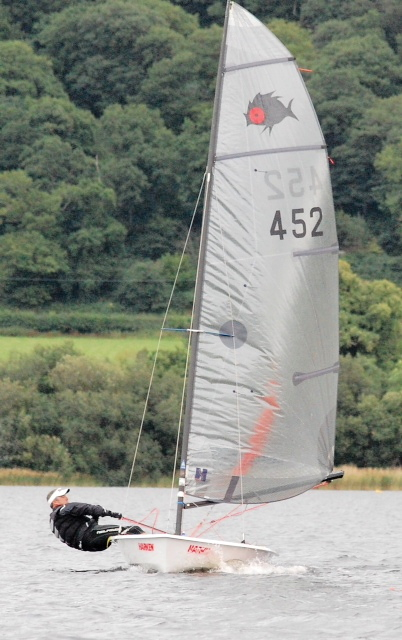
- Solution dinghy sailing in race conditions

Development
- Designer: Kevin Clark and Andrew Elliott
- Year: 2005
- Name: Solution

Boat
- Crew: 1

Hull
- Type: Monohull
- Construction: Foam sandwich epoxy
- Hull weight: 56 kg (123 lb)
- LOA: 3.9 m (12 ft 10 in)
- Beam: 1.75 m (5 ft 9 in)

Rig
- Mast height: 5.9 m (19 ft 4 in)

Sails
- Mainsail area: 8.5 m^{2} (91 sq ft)

Racing
- RYA PN: 1089

The Solution is a single handed hiking dinghy designed for helms in the 65 to 85 kg (10 to 14 Stone) weight range. It has a light epoxy hull, self draining cockpit, high aspect rig, semi battened 8.5 sq. metre sail, and full complement of dual controls.

== History ==
The original design by Kevin Clark and Andrew Elliott dates from 2005. The design is similar to that of the Phantom, though aimed at lighter sailors. The boat was originally marketed by Red Eye Sails with the name Red Eye Solution, the hulls being manufactured by Ovington Boats. The boat was reviewed by Yachts and Yachting, by Dinghy Magazine and by Sail-World. In 2008 the entire Solution operation was taken over by Ovington. The Red Eye fish logo was retained, and remains the class symbol. Several design changes were introduced at this time.

- GRP mainsheet tower (previously metal)
- Recessed adjustable forestay block (previously a raised block)
- Straight transom bar and rudder stock
- Selden mast and boom
- New Hyde sail

== Characteristics ==
All Solution hulls are of foam sandwich epoxy vacuum bagged construction, with a fully draining cockpit and wide side decks for comfortable hiking. The hull, sails, rig and foils are a strict one design to control costs. However, considerable freedom is allowed in the placement of fittings to allow boats to be tailored to personal preference.

The mast is a sealed section with a halyard running inside the track to help prevent inversion on capsize. The mast has single spreaders and lower shrouds to allow adjustment for different helms and conditions. The forestay is adjustable to allow depowering in conjunction with a cascade style kicker. A pivoting centreboard and rudder are made of moulded glass fibre construction. The laminate sails are available in two cuts to suit different sailors.

== Sailing clubs with Solution dinghies ==
Solution dinghies are sailed at the following clubs in the UK:

- Bala
- Blakeny
- Bough Beech
- Bowmoor
- Bradford on Avon
- Broxbourne
- Burghfield
- Calshot
- Chase
- Clevedon
- Delph
- Fishers Green SC
- Grafham Water
- Gunfleet
- Hickling Broad
- Hunts
- Hykeham
- Lee on the Solent
- Leigh and Lowton
- Llandudno
- Lyme Regis
- Newhaven and Seaford S.C.
- Melton Mowbray
- North Staffs
- Northampton
- Ogston
- Olton Mere
- Overy Staithe
- Oxford
- Penzance
- Pevensey Bay Sailing Club
- Portishead
- Redditch
- Redesmere
- Rhosneigr
- Ripon
- Rutland
- Seafarers
- Severn
- South Shields
