= Dolphin 15 Senior =

Sailboat class

- Class symbol

Development
- Designer: Glenn Corcorran and Murray Corcorran
- Location: United States
- Year: 1964
- No. built: 9,000
- Builders: Silverline Boats; Dolphin Sailboat Company
- Name: Dolphin 15 Senior

Boat
- Displacement: 170 lb (77 kg)
- Draft: 1.54 ft (0.47 m) with the daggerboard down

Hull
- Type: Monohull
- Construction: Fiberglass
- LOA: 14.50 ft (4.42 m)
- LWL: 13.50 ft (4.11 m)
- Beam: 5.08 ft (1.55 m)

Hull appendages
- Keel: daggerboard
- Rudder: transom-mounted rudder

Rig
- Rig type: Lateen rig

Sails
- Sailplan: Lateen
- Mainsail area: 85 sq ft (7.9 m^{2})
- Total sail area: 85 sq ft (7.9 m^{2})

Racing
- D-PN: 106.2

The Dolphin 15 Senior, sometimes referred to as just the Dolphin Senior, is an American sailing dinghy that was designed by brothers Glenn Corcorran and Murray Corcorran and first built in 1964.

== Production ==
The design was built by Silverline Boats in Moorhead, Minnesota, United States, until 1980 when the company closed. Production was then assumed by the Dolphin Sailboat Company of Independence, Missouri from 1981 to 1985 when it ceased business. The boat design is now out of production.

== Design ==
The Dolphin 15 Senior is a recreational sailboat, built predominantly of fiberglass. It has a lateen rig, a spooned, raked stem, a vertical transom, a rounded, transom-hung rudder controlled by a tiller and a retractable fiberglass daggerboard. The rudder is fiberglass, with an aluminum head. The boat displaces 170 lb (77 kg).

The boat has a draft of 1.54 ft (0.47 m) with the daggerboard extended and 3 in (7.6 cm) with it retracted, allowing beaching or ground transportation on a trailer or car roof rack.

For sailing the design has hiking bars, a high freeboard and a molded splashguard in front of the mast. It has a small, square, open stowage compartment molded into the hull, just aft of the mast.

The design has a Portsmouth Yardstick racing average handicap of 106.2 and is normally raced by one sailor.

== Operational history ==
In a 1994 review Richard Sherwood notes that the, "Dolphin is a lateen-rigged cat board boat, slightly longer than most. Capacity for reasonable sailing is two adults."

Randle B. Moore wrote about the design in 2011, saying, "the Dolphin Senior is one of many small sailboats patterned after the world's most produced boat, the Sunfish. The Dolphin is slightly larger than a Sunfish and will hold two full size adults easily."

== See also ==
- List of sailing boat types

Similar sailboats

- Phantom 14
- Super Porpoise
- Sunfish (sailboat)
