= Farrier Trailertri 720 =

1976 trimaran sailboat

Farrier Trailertri 18
Development
- Designer: Ian Farrier
- Location: Australia
- Year: 1976
- Role: day sailer for 2-4 adults
- Name: Farrier Trailertri 18

Boat
- Draft: 1.3 m (4.3 ft) (board down); 0.43 m (1.4 ft) (board up)

Hull
- Type: trimaran
- Construction: marine plywood
- Hull weight: 750 kg (1,650 lb)
- LOA: 7.2 m (24 ft)
- LWL: 6.6 m (22 ft)
- Beam: 4.98 m (16.3 ft); 2.44 m (8.0 ft) (folded)

Hull appendages
- Keel: centreboard

Rig
- Rig type: masthead Bermuda or Marconi rig
- Mast height: 9.32 m (30.6 ft)

Sails
- Mainsail area: 14.4 m^{2} (155 sq ft)
- Jib/genoa area: 11.3 m^{2} (122 sq ft)
- Spinnaker area: 54 m^{2} (580 sq ft)
- Total sail area: 25.7 m^{2} (277 sq ft)

The Farrier Trailertri 720 (also known as Farrier TT720) is a trailerable 1976 trimaran sailboat designed by Ian Farrier that was sold in plan form, targeted at owner builders assembling from marine plywood, and marketed as a day sailer.

== See also ==
- List of multihulls
- Farrier Marine
