= Phantom 14 (catamaran) =

Sailboat class

Development
- Location: Italy
- Year: 1995
- Builder: Centro Nautico Adriatico
- Role: Sailing dinghy
- Name: Phantom 14

Boat
- Crew: one
- Displacement: 198 lb (90 kg)
- Draft: 1.50 ft (0.46 m) with centreboards down

Hull
- Type: Catamaran
- Construction: Glassfibre foam sandwich
- LOA: 14.11 ft (4.30 m)
- Beam: 7.22 ft (2.20 m)

Hull appendages
- Keel: twin centreboards
- Rudder: twin transom-mounted rudders

Rig
- Rig type: Catboat rig, optional sloop rig

Sails
- Sailplan: Catboat
- Mainsail area: 107.00 sq ft (9.941 m^{2})
- Total sail area: 107.00 sq ft (9.941 m^{2})

The Phantom 14, also called the Phantom 14', is an Italian catamaran sailing dinghy that was first built in 1995.

== Production ==
The design has been built by Centro Nautico Adriatico in Italy since 1995 and remains in production.

== Design ==
The Phantom 14 is a recreational sailboat, built predominantly of glassfibre, with a foam core. It has a stayed catboat rig or sloop rig with the additional of the optional jib. It has a rotating, watertight anodized aluminum mast and full battened Dacron mainsail. The hulls have raked stems, vertical transoms, transom-hung, kick-up rudders controlled by a tiller and retractable kick-up centreboards. The boat displaces 198 lb (90 kg).

The boat has a draft of 1.50 ft (0.46 m) with the centerboards extended and 0.23 ft (0.070 m) with them retracted, allowing beaching or ground transportation on a trailer or car roof rack. A two-piece mast is available to facilitate ground transport and storage.

The boat can be sailed with one or two people.

== See also ==
- List of sailing boat types
- List of multihulls

Similar sailboats

- DC‐14 Phantom - a boat with a similar name
- Phantom (dinghy) - a 14.50 foot catboat with a similar name
- Phantom 14 - a 14 foot Lateen-rigged sailboat with the same name
- Phantom 16 (catamaran) - a boat with a similar name
