= Farrier Trailertri 18 =

Development
- Designer: Ian Farrier
- Location: Australia
- Year: 1976
- Role: day sailer for 2-3 adults
- Name: Farrier Trailertri 18

Boat
- Draft: 1.14 m (3.7 ft) (board down); 0.36 m (1.2 ft) (board up)

Hull
- Type: trimaran
- Construction: marine plywood
- Hull weight: 770 kg (1,700 lb)
- LOA: 5.64 m (18.5 ft)
- LWL: 5.19 m (17.0 ft)
- Beam: 4.27 m (14.0 ft); 2.39 m (7.8 ft) (folded)

Hull appendages
- Keel: centreboard

Rig
- Rig type: masthead Bermuda or Marconi rig
- Mast height: 7 m (23 ft)

Sails
- Mainsail area: 7.9 m^{2} (85 sq ft)
- Jib/genoa area: 7.1 m^{2} (76 sq ft)
- Spinnaker area: 10.7 m^{2} (115 sq ft)
- Total sail area: 25.7 m^{2} (277 sq ft)

The Farrier Trailertri 18 is a trailerable 1976 trimaran sailboat designed by Ian Farrier that was sold in plan form, targeted at owner builders assembling from marine plywood, and marketed as a day sailer.

== See also ==
- List of multihulls
- Farrier Marine
