= Dolphin 17 =

Sailboat class

Development
- Designer: Glenn Corcorran and Murray Corcorran
- Location: United States
- Year: 1970
- No. built: 740
- Builders: Universal Plastic Products; Silverline Boats
- Name: Dolphin 17

Boat
- Displacement: 725 lb (329 kg)
- Draft: 4.25 ft (1.30 m) with centerboard down

Hull
- Type: Monohull
- Construction: Fiberglass
- LOA: 16.75 ft (5.11 m)
- LWL: 15.00 ft (4.57 m)
- Beam: 6.00 ft (1.83 m)

Hull appendages
- Keel: centerboard
- Rudder: transom-mounted rudder

Rig
- Rig type: Bermuda rig
- I foretriangle height: 21.67 ft (6.61 m)
- J foretriangle base: 5.50 ft (1.68 m)
- P mainsail luff: 19.16 ft (5.84 m)
- E mainsail foot: 7.00 ft (2.13 m)

Sails
- Sailplan: Masthead sloop
- Mainsail area: 67.06 sq ft (6.230 m^{2})
- Jib/genoa area: 59.59 sq ft (5.536 m^{2})
- Total sail area: 126.65 sq ft (11.766 m^{2})

Racing
- D-PN: 97.8

The Dolphin 17 is an American trailerable sailboat that was designed by Glenn Corcorran and Murray Corcorran and first built in 1970.

== Production ==
The design was initially built by Universal Plastic Products, first in Houston, Texas, United States and later in Coffeyville, Kansas when the company relocated there. It was then built by Silverline Boats in Moorhead, Minnesota, although that company closed in 1980 and the design is now out of production. A total of 740 examples of the type were completed.

== Design ==
The Dolphin 17 is a recreational sailboat, built predominantly of fiberglass, with wood trim. It has a masthead sloop rig, including a backstay, aluminum spars, a spooned raked stem, a vertical transom, a transom-hung, kick-up fiberglass rudder controlled by a tiller with an extension and a retractable fiberglass centerboard. Unusually, the jib is not mounted to the forestay.

The boat has a draft of 4.25 ft (1.30 m) with the centerboard extended and 1.08 ft (0.33 m) with it retracted, allowing beaching or ground transportation on a trailer or car roof rack.

For sailing the design is equipped with a self-bailing cockpit, a mainsheet traveler and a boom vang. There are three stowage lockers fitted, two on either side and one in the stern of the boat.

The design has a Portsmouth Yardstick racing average handicap of 97.8 and is normally raced with a crew of two sailors.

== Variants ==
Dolphin 17
This open boat with a foredeck model displaces 725 lb (329 kg) and carries 200 lb (91 kg) of ballast.
Dolphin 17C
This model is equipped with a cuddy cabin with a single window per side and displaces 800 lb (363 kg) and carries 200 lb (91 kg) of ballast.

== Operational history ==
In a 1994 review Richard Sherwood wrote, "in addition to the open design, there is a cabin model available. As might be expected, it is slightly heavier and has a reduced sail area. Capacity in either model is six adults; the cabin model sleeps two. The Dolphin 17 has covered storage on both sides of the mast, as well as aft storage."

== See also ==
- List of sailing boat types

Similar sailboats

- Siren 17
