= Stiletto 27 =

1970s American catamaran

Development
- Designer: Bill Higgins and Don Ansley
- Location: United States
- Year: 1976
- No. built: 500
- Builder: Stiletto Catamarans
- Name: Stiletto 27

Boat
- Displacement: 1,100 lb (499 kg)
- Draft: 4.00 ft (1.22 m), daggerboards down

Hull
- Type: Multihull
- Construction: Fiberglass
- LOA: 26.83 ft (8.18 m)
- LWL: 24.00 ft (7.32 m)
- Beam: 13.83 ft (4.22 m)
- Engine: outboard motor

Hull appendages
- Keel: daggerboard
- Ballast: none
- Rudder: dual transom-mounted rudders

Rig
- Rig type: Bermuda rig

Sails
- Sailplan: Fractional rigged sloop
- Mainsail area: 230 sq ft (21 m^{2})
- Jib/genoa area: 159 sq ft (14.8 m^{2})
- Spinnaker area: 750 sq ft (70 m^{2})
- Total sail area: 336 sq ft (31.2 m^{2})

The Stiletto 27 is an American catamaran sailboat that was designed by Bill Higgins and Don Ansley as a racer/cruiser and first built in 1976.

The design was originally marketed by the manufacturer just as the Stiletto, but later became the Stiletto 27 to differentiate it from the later 1983 Stiletto 30 and 1985 Stiletto 23 designs.

== Production ==
The design was built by Stiletto Catamarans (a division of Force Engineering) in the United States. A total of 500 were built, but it is now out of production.

== Design ==
The Stiletto 27 is a recreational catamaran, built predominantly of fiberglass, with an epoxy and Nomex core. It has a fractional sloop rig with a full-roach mainsail, raked stems, slightly reverse transoms, transom-hung rudders controlled by a tiller and a single, centrally mounted daggerboard keel.

The racing versions are heavier and incorporate extra sails, sheet winches and a 6:1 downhaul. A 750 sq ft (70 m^{2}) spinaker and pivoting centerboard are optional for both cruising and racing versions.

The boat has a draft of 4.00 ft (1.22 m) with the daggerboard extended and 0.75 ft (0.23 m) with it retracted, allowing beaching or ground transportation on a trailer. For ground transport the design collapses to a width of 7.95 ft (2.42 m).

Both hulls have double berths, while the port hull houses the portable head. The starboard hull houses the galley. Further sleeping space can be created with the use of a deck tent.

Access to each hull is via the raised Lexan skylight, which are slid forward for access. Additional portlights are in the hull sides, two per hull. The boat is normally fitted with a small outboard motor for docking and maneuvering.

Roller furling headsails are optional. Other factory options include jiffy reefing, a halyard winch, jib sheet winches and a reduced-area cruising mainsail.

The design has a hull speed of 6.56 kn (12.15 km/h).

== Operational history ==
In an account in Sail magazine published in May 1982, writer Robby Robinson describes the design's performance, "I was pleasantly surprised at Stiletto’s maneuverability. She is heavy enough (1,100 pounds) to have some carry, and the centerline daggerboard helps her spin quite nimbly from one tack to the other. Her high aspect rudders stall somewhat, especially if you're attempting to bear off without much way on. Still, she responds to sheet adjustment and rudder wriggling better than most boats, and her rapid acceleration is a real plus in tight quarters."

== Variants ==
Stiletto 27
This model was designed by Bill Higgins and Don Ansley and introduced in 1976. It displaces 1,100 lb (499 kg).
Stiletto 27 Championship Edition
This model was designed by Bill Higgins and introduced in 1977. It displaces 1,200 lb (544 kg).
Stiletto 27 Special Edition
This model was designed by Bill Higgins and introduced in 1978. It displaces 1,570 lb (712 kg).
Stiletto 27 GT
This model two daggerboards, one in each hull.
