= Silver Line Boats =

American boat manufacturer

- Founded: 1959; 67 years ago
- Defunct: 1980
- Fate: Brand acquired by Internautic Marine Group
- Headquarters: Moorhead, Minnesota, United States

Silver Line Boats or Silverline Boats was formed in 1959 in Moorhead, Minnesota, United States. They sold medium-sized motorboats made of fiberglass. They also built and sold fiberglass sailboats. For the next twenty years, the company built thousands of boats and sold them around the world. First, the name was spelled Silver Line, was later changed to Silverline. Silver Line also tried manufacturing snowmobiles, but the sales didn't take off very well. The factory was closed in 1980 and the name has since gone to a new boat company, Internautic Marine Group.

== Boats ==
- Dolphin 15 Senior
- Dolphin 17
