= Phantom 16 (catamaran) =

Sailboat class

Development
- Location: Italy
- Year: 1988
- Builder: Centro Nautico Adriatico
- Role: Sailing dinghy
- Name: Phantom 16

Boat
- Crew: one
- Displacement: 265 lb (120 kg)
- Draft: 1.50 ft (0.46 m) with centreboards down

Hull
- Type: Catamaran
- Construction: glassfibre foam sandwich
- LOA: 15.91 ft (4.85 m)
- Beam: 7.55 ft (2.30 m)

Hull appendages
- Keel: twin centreboards
- Rudder: twin transom-mounted rudders

Rig
- Rig type: Bermuda rig

Sails
- Sailplan: Fractional rigged sloop
- Mainsail area: 301.00 sq ft (27.964 m^{2})
- Total sail area: 301.00 sq ft (27.964 m^{2})

The Phantom 16, also called the Phantom 16', is an Italian catamaran sailing dinghy that was first built in 1988.

== Production ==
The design has been built by Centro Nautico Adriatico in Italy since 1988 and remains in production.

== Design ==
The manufacturer describes the boat's design as "a compromise, since it strikes the right balance between practicality and fun."

The Phantom 16 is a recreational sailboat, built predominantly of glassfibre, with a foam core. It has a stayed fractional rigged sloop rig. It has a rotating, watertight anodized aluminum mast and full battened Dacron mainsail. The hulls have raked stems, vertical transoms, transom-hung, kick-up rudders controlled by a tiller and retractable kick-up centreboards. The boat displaces 265 lb (120 kg) and can be fitted with a gennaker.

The boat has a draft of 1.50 ft (0.46 m) with the centerboards extended and 0.25 ft (0.076 m) with them retracted, allowing beaching or ground transportation on a trailer or car roof rack. A two-piece mast is available to facilitate ground transport and storage.

The boat can be sailed with one to three people.

== See also ==
- List of sailing boat types
- List of multihulls

Related development

- Phantom 14 (catamaran)

Similar sailboats

- DC‐14 Phantom - a boat with a similar name
- Phantom (dinghy) - a 14.50 foot catboat with a similar name
- Phantom 14 - a 14 foot Lateen-rigged sailboat with a similar name
