= Corsair Marine =

Sailboat builder

Corsair Marine International is a sailboat builder that builds trailerable trimarans. Since 1984, Corsair Marine has sold more than 2,500 trimarans. Dealers represent and service Corsair Marine's trimarans in 6 regions of the US and 19 other locations internationally. Currently, Corsair Marine builds 24', 28', 31', and 37' trimarans in different configurations. Since October 2010, the company belongs to the Australian boat builder Seawind Catamarans. The production facility is located in Vietnam.

== History ==
Corsair Marine was founded in 1984 in Chula Vista, California, by John T. Walton (son of Sam Walton, founder of the retail corporation, Wal-Mart). The boat designer Ian Farrier was part of the management team. Farrier had patented a hull folding system in 1975, and designed and built the company's first product, the Corsair F-27. Farrier stayed with the company until 1991 when he decided to pursue his own business interests.

In 1994, John Walton sold Corsair Marine to Paul Koch who was the company's Australian Dealer at the time. Koch also owned a boat building company in Australia called OSTAC and had worked with Ian Farrier, so when Koch bought Corsair Marine, he invited Farrier to rejoin. Farrier agreed and worked at Corsair Marine for the next six years. When Farrier left in 2000 to pursue his own business interests again with Farrier Marine, Corsair Marine purchased all rights to his F-24, F-28, and F-31 trimaran designs. Subsequently, the branding changed from the Farrier branding of "F-" to the Corsair style using the "C". By way of example, the "F-31" trimaran became the "C31" or "Corsair 31" trimaran.

In 2006 Corsair Marine relocated headquarters and production facility from California to Ho Chi Minh City (HCMC), Vietnam, to reduce costs. Vietnam was chosen for its political stability, FDI (foreign direct investment) provisions, booming economy, and its pool of talented labour. Some staff from California relocated to Vietnam to facilitate the migration of the business and the setting up and running of the factory.

In October 2010, Corsair was acquired by the Australian company Seawind Catamarans. Seawind moved some of the catamaran production lines to the joint Vietnam facility. The Seawind group has over 200 staff.

== Models ==
- Corsair F-27 (1985)
- Corsair F-24 (1991–2006)
- Corsair 31 (1990–2013): The C31 also comes in three different models. In June 2010, Borge Ousland and Thorleif Thorleifsson will set off in a Corsair Marine 31UC trimaran and attempt to sail around the North Pole (circumnavigate the Arctic Ocean).
- Corsair 24 Mark II (1996)
- Corsair 28 (2001–2016): The C28 comes in three different configurations: the C28 CR Cruiser (Centre Cockpit), the C28 CE (Centre Cockpit), and the C28 RS Racer (Aft Cockpit).
- Sprint 750 (2005–2016) (24') MK II: The Sprint 750 is a day sailor that won Sailing World Magazine's 2007 Sportboat of the Year.
- Dash 750 (2009–2016) (24'): The Dash 750, a pocket cruiser, was launched by Corsair Marine in January 2009.
- Corsair 36 (2011): The C36 was a large cruising trimaran.
- Cruze 970 (2014)
- Pulse 600 (2014)
- Corsair 970 Sport (2017) The 970 sport is a more powerful lighter weight racing version of her tamer Cruze variant.
- Corsair 760 (2017) Introduced in 2017, the 760 is a 24' trailerable, weekend cruiser.
- Corsair 37 (2017): The C37 comes in two models and is the biggest of Corsair Marine's trimarans.
- Corsair 880 (2020)

== See also ==
- Farrier Marine
- List of multihulls
- Dragonfly Trimarans
