= Phantom (dinghy) =

Sailboat class

Development
- Designer: Paul Wright & Brian Taylor
- Location: United Kingdom
- Year: 1971
- No. built: 1,000
- Builders: Butler Boats, Ovington Boats, Vander Craft
- Role: One-design racer
- Name: Phantom

Boat
- Displacement: 134 lb (61 kg)
- Draft: 2.80 ft (0.85 m) with the centreboard down

Hull
- Type: Monohull
- Construction: Fibreglass, wood, composite material
- LOA: 14.50 ft (4.42 m)
- LWL: 13.83 ft (4.22 m)
- Beam: 5.50 ft (1.68 m)

Hull appendages
- Keel: centreboard
- Rudder: transom-mounted rudder

Rig
- Rig type: Catboat rig

Sails
- Sailplan: Catboat
- Mainsail area: 105.00 sq ft (9.755 m^{2})
- Total sail area: 105.00 sq ft (9.755 m^{2})

The Phantom is a British sailing dinghy that was designed by Paul Wright and Brian Taylor as a one-design racer and first built in 1971.

== Production ==
The design was at one time built by Butler Boats and Vander Craft, both located in the United Kingdom. It is now constructed by Ovington Boats, which is also in the United Kingdom. Ovington-built boats are still sold by Vander Craft.

The boat can also be amateur-built from plans, using the stitch and glue construction method.

== Design ==
The Phantom is a recreational sailboat, with the hull built predominantly of a fibreglass foam sandwich laminate. The hull has hard chines and a deep V-shaped bow to promote planing. It has a stayed mast, typically made from carbon fibre along with the boom. It has a catboat rig, a raked stem, a vertical transom, a transom-hung rudder controlled by a tiller and a retractable centreboard. It displaces 134 lb (61 kg).

The boat has a draft of 2.80 ft (0.85 m) with the centreboard extended and 6 in (15 cm) with it retracted, allowing beaching or ground transportation on a trailer or car roof rack.

== Operational history ==
A review in Go Sail noted of the design, "with her lightweight hull and large rig on a stayed mast she has a high power to weight ratio, but is stable and responsive. There is no trapeze or spinnaker and she can carry a wide range of helm weights".

== See also ==
- List of sailing boat types
- DC‐14 Phantom - a boat with a similar name
- Phantom 14 - a lateen-rigged boat with the same name
- Phantom 14 (catamaran) - a boat with a similar name
- Phantom 16 (catamaran) - a boat with a similar name

Similar sailboats

- Laser (dinghy)
- RS Aero
