= Farrier Marine =

New Zealand manufacturer

Farrier Marine is a catamaran and trimaran manufacturer based in Christchurch, New Zealand.

The sailing boats produced by this shipyard are designed by Ian Farrier (1947-2017), and have a unique patented folding system without hinges in the beams or the critical beam to float join, allowing overall beam to be varied in seconds by just one person.

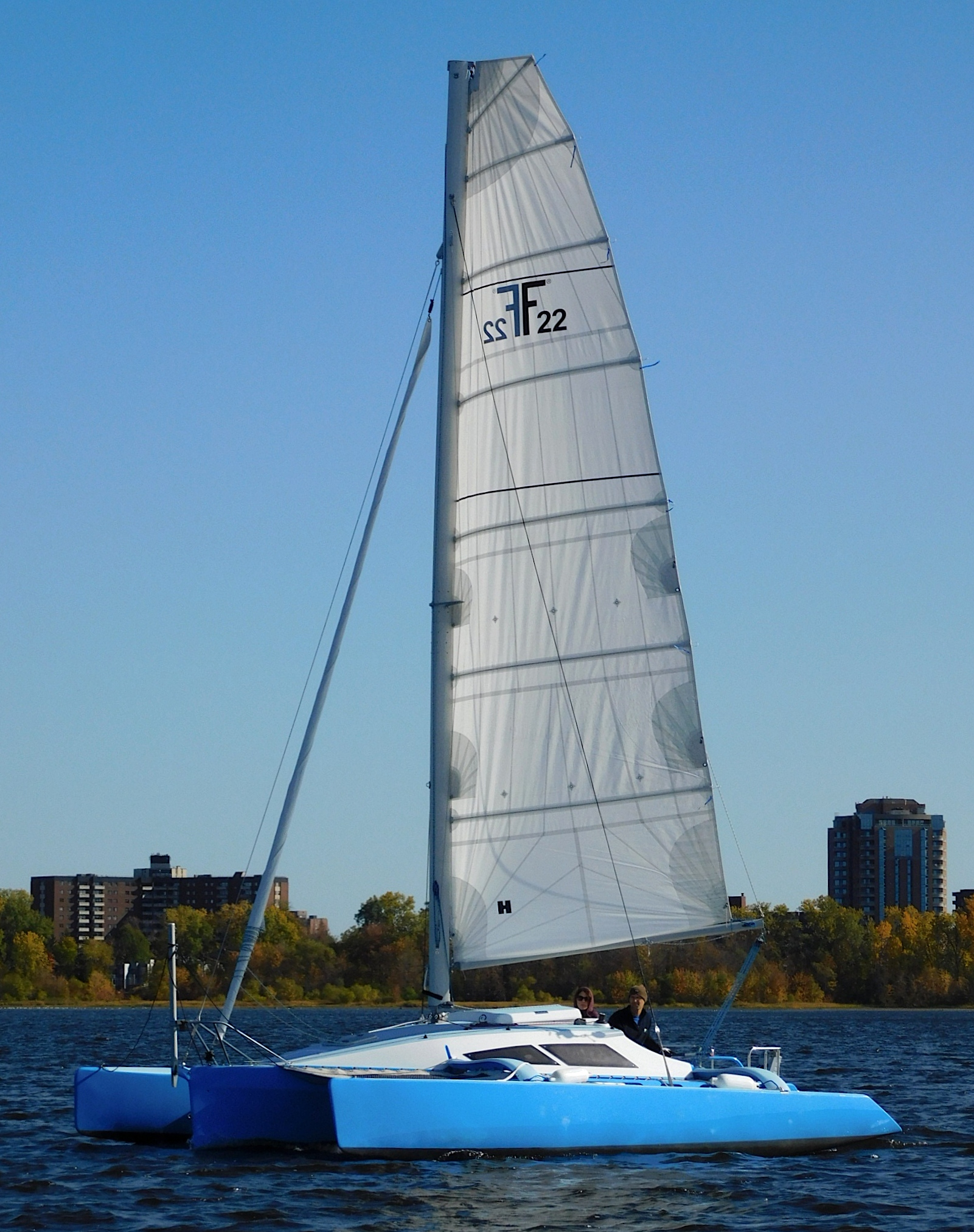
Farrier F-22 trimaran sailboat

== History ==
After gaining hands-on experience from building and sailing his own sailboats, Ian Farrier designed a trimaran folding system and applied in 1973 for a patent that was granted in 1975 as the Farrier Folding System.

In 1974, the original prototype was built and launched by Farrier in Australia, followed in 1976 by the first Trailertri 18, and in 1980 by the first production fiberglass Farrier trimaran, the 'Tramp', that was named Australian Boat of the Year in 1981.

In 1984, Ian Farrier funded by Corsair Marine in the US and started designing and building the F-27 trimaran Super Fox which set a race record in her first official event - the Two Man Around Catalina Race, a feat she repeated on 1986. In 1989, The F-27 CORSAIR won the multihull division of the Newport - Ensenada Race.

For the first time in history the Nippon Ocean Racing Club recognised the F-27 as an official class in 1990, and during the same year the F-27 AQUA TEC won the Australian Multihull Offshore Championships (AMOC). F-27s were also the first multihulls invited to compete in the National Offshore One Design Regatta (N.O.O.D.).

In 1991, Ian Farrier decided to leave the management of Corsair Marine to focus on new designs, but continued under a licencing agreement. Shortly thereafter the F-9A design was launched by Farrier Marine, together with the F-31 (production version of F-9A), that in 1992 was named Australian Sailboat of the Year. They were followed by the F-25C, the F-31, and the Corsair F-28, judged as Sailing World's 1998 Performance Multihull Sailboat of the Year.

In 2001, Ian Farrier decided to part from Corsair Marine, stating that Farrier Marine had provided Corsair with all its production guides in the past, while regularly monitoring construction, quality and specification compliance, all of which took considerable time. After the separation, more time could be devoted to providing a larger range of both lower cost and more technically advanced designs, such as the F-22, F-32, F-33, F-39, F-41 and F-44SC. After abandoning Corsair Marine, Farrier announced a plan version of the F-33 production model named the F-32. In 2003, the F-33 was launched in Australia. In September 2007, the first F-39 was launched, followed in May 2008 by the first F-22, in July 2009 by the release of the F-32SR design and in November 2010 by the F-85SR design.

December 2010 marked the first F-22 production float hull made and on 2011 the F-22 production version was released. However, after the 2011 Christchurch earthquake work on the new projects slowed a little, although the shipyard didn't suffer real casualties, apart from some damage at the moldmaker's factory, on the wall and floor.

== Product line ==
=== Current ===
Farrier Marine's current product line is composed of the following models:

==== Trimarans ====
- F-22 and F-22R (2013)
- The following may continue to be built, but are not built by Farrier Marine itself.
- F-32 (2007) and F-32SR (2009) - "home builders version of the F-33 [replacing] the F-9 design series"
- F-33 (2003) - "production design intended to be a maxi trailerable sport cruiser, while still being manageable single-handed"
- F-36 (before 1996)- "A true ocean going cruiser, and demountable for transporting on a trailer (but not folding)".
- F-39 (2007) - "Another new design that folds for marina docking - based on the F-36 - available only to experienced builders"
- F-82A and F-82R - replaced the F-25A and F-25C, with many improvements and updated features. Can be built in all carbon epoxy, the same as the F-25C, but faster.
- F-85SR (2010)

==== Catamarans ====
- F-45 - Redesigned version of the F-44SC, with improved body and curved foils, in late-stage development as of 2016.
- F-45R - Racing variant of the F-45, with larger sails and carbon-fiber body, in late-stage development as of 2016.

=== Former ===
Note that these former models were designed by Ian Farrier earlier in his career but may not have been produced by Farrier Marine.

==== Trimarans ====
- Command 10 (1983)
- Trailertri 18 (1976)
- Trailertri 680 (1977)
- Tramp (TRAMP) (1980) - Australian Boat of the Year, 1981. "The first production Farrier design (19' 6" long), originally built by Haines Hunter in Australia in 1980. An open cockpit day sailer, it was also built in the US for a while where it was known as the 'Eagle'. Now discontinued but sometimes available on the used boat market."
- Trailertri 720 (1983)
- F-9 (F-9A, F-9R, F-9AX) (1991) which evolved to the F-31, whose plans were subsequently frequently updated then sold in 2000 to Corsair Marine, where design changes were applied to produce the Corsair 31.
- Farrier F-24 (1992)
- Farrier F-24 Mk II (1994) - Sailing World's 1996 Performance Multihull of the Year.
- F-25A (1993) - "An earlier design for amateur builders [...] replaced by the F-82A & F-82R".
- F-25C (1995) - discontinued high performance carbon/epoxy kit boat, partly replaced by F-82R.
- F-31R (1996)
- F-27 (1985) - American Sailboat Hall of Fame. "The second production Farrier design (450 built) and then superseded by the F-28."
- F-28 (1997) - Sailing World's 1998 'Performance Multihull Sailboat of the Year'. Upgrade of the F-27 "using the same float, beam, and main hull molds, but with a number of key improvements in rig and structure".

==== Catamarans ====
- F-41 (2002) - Ian Farrier's first catamaran design, a "French style luxury cruiser catamaran". Marketed as "A new ocean going catamaran design for amateur builders", it is no longer current as the design has since evolved to the F-44 production boats.
- F-44R - "A very high performance version of the F-41", "the racing version of the Farrier F-41, with more waterline length, a taller rig, and a lower profile cabin for less windage and weight".
- F-44SC - The 'super cruiser' version of the F-44 with extra internal room. Built by Multihulls Direct, under license.

== See also ==
- List of multihulls
