= Screecher =

Sail that combines the features of a spinnaker and a reacher

A screacher is a sail that combines the features of a spinnaker and a reacher.

Its similarity with a spinnaker is that it is not attached to a stay along its luff, and typically has a slightly larger curvature than a genoa. Luff shape and tension is maintained by the halyard and a bolt rope which is woven into the sail itself, and it is this stiff tensioned rope which allows the sail to be furled on itself. In addition, many screachers are gybed by allowing the sail to fly free and pass in front of the bolt rope and invert, much in the same way that an asymmetrical spinnaker is gybed. Tacking with a screacher may require furling and re-setting. The similarity with a genoa is that it is typically a white sail, and the clews always overlap the mast.
