= Vacuum bag moulding =

Vacuum bag moulding is the primary composite manufacturing process for producing laminated structures. It is common in the aerospace industry.

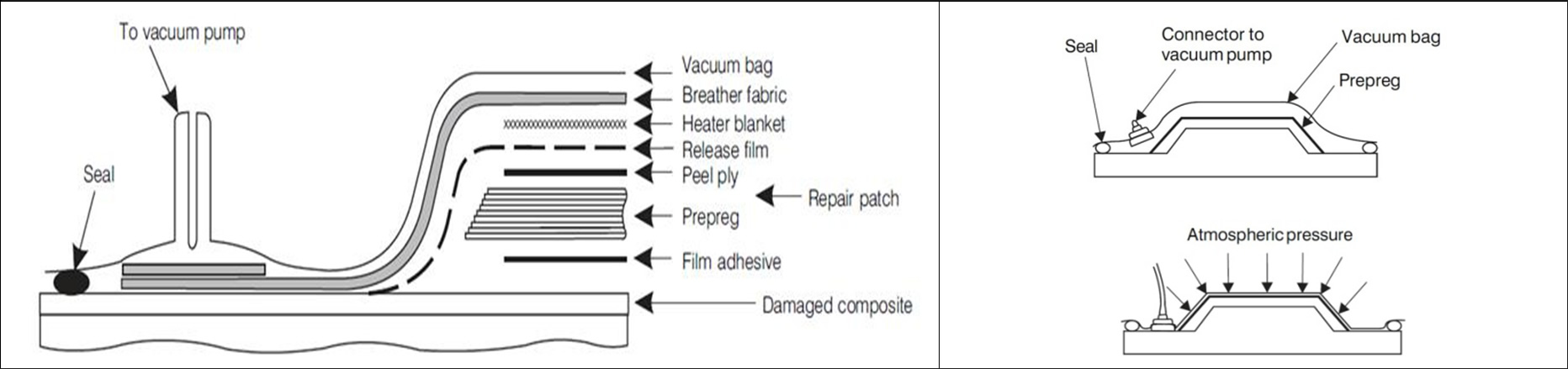
Vacuum bag moulding and different parts used in this process

== Process ==
It utilizes a flexible film to enclose the part and seal it from the outside air. The vacuum bag material is accessible in a tube shape or a sheet of material. Then, a vacuum is drawn on the vacuum bag, and atmospheric pressure compresses the part during the cure. When a tube-shaped bag is used, the entire part can be enclosed within the bag. When utilizing sheet bagging materials, the edges of the vacuum bag are sealed against the edges of the mould surface to enclose the part against an air-tight mould. When bagged in this way, the lower mould is a rigid structure and the upper surface of the part is formed by the flexible membrane vacuum bag. The flexible membrane can be a reusable silicone material or an extruded polymer film. A vacuum is drawn on the part (and held) during cure after sealing the part inside the vacuum bag. This process can be fulfilled at either ambient or elevated temperature with ambient atmospheric pressure acting upon the vacuum bag. A vacuum pump is used usually to draw a vacuum. A cost-effective method of drawing a vacuum is with a venturi vacuum and air compressor.

== History ==
Vacuum bag moulding emerged in the 1950s as composite materials gained popularity in aerospace and military applications. The method was developed to improve resin control and fiber compaction in comparison to hand lay-up techniques. Over the decades, the process evolved with improvements in vacuum pump technology, sealing materials, and reusable silicone bagging systems. Today, it remains a reliable method in industries requiring high performance and precision in fiber-reinforced plastics.

== Vacuum bag ==
It is built of strong rubber-coated fabric or a polymer film used to compress the part during cure or hardening. In some purposes, the bag encloses the entire material, or in other purposes, a mould is used to form one face of the laminate with the bag being a single layer to seal to the outer edge of the mould face. When using a tube-shaped bag, the ends of the bag are sealed and the air is drawn out of the bag through a nipple using a vacuum pump. Consequently, uniform pressure approaching one atmosphere is applied to the surfaces of the object inside the bag, holding parts together while the adhesive cures. The whole bag may be put in a temperature-controlled oven, oil bath or water bath and gently heated to accelerate curing.

Vacuum bagging is used broadly in the composites industry as well. Carbon fiber fabric and fiberglass, along with epoxies and resins are popular materials laminated together with a vacuum bag operation.

== Woodworking applications ==
Vacuum bags are used to laminate curved and irregular shaped workpieces in commercial woodworking facilities.

Polyurethane or vinyl materials are used to make the bag typically. A tube-shaped bag is open at both ends. The piece or pieces to be glued are placed into the bag and the ends sealed. One method of sealing open ends of the bag is by placing a clamp on each end of the bag. A plastic rod is laid across the end of the bag, then, the bag is folded over the rod. A plastic sleeve with an opening in it is then snapped over the rod. This procedure forms a seal at both ends of the bag when the vacuum is ready to be drawn.

Sometimes, a "platen" is used inside the bag for the piece being glued to lie on. The platen has a series of small slots cut into it, to allow the air under it to be evacuated. The platen must have rounded corners and edges to restrict the vacuum from tearing the bag.

When a curved part is to be glued in a vacuum bag, the pieces being glued must be placed over a solidly built form, or have an air bladder placed under the form. This air bladder has access to "free air" outside the bag. It is used to create an equal pressure under the form, restricting it from being crushed.

== Applications ==
Vacuum bag moulding is widely used in industries where high strength-to-weight ratios are critical. Besides aerospace, the technique is prominent in:

- Marine industry: Used for producing lightweight boat hulls and decks with high structural integrity.
- Automotive: Applied in fabricating car body panels and racing components due to its weight-saving advantages.
- Wind energy: Employed in the manufacture of wind turbine blades to ensure even resin distribution and minimal void content.
- Sports equipment: Items like skis, snowboards, and hockey sticks benefit from consistent lamination.

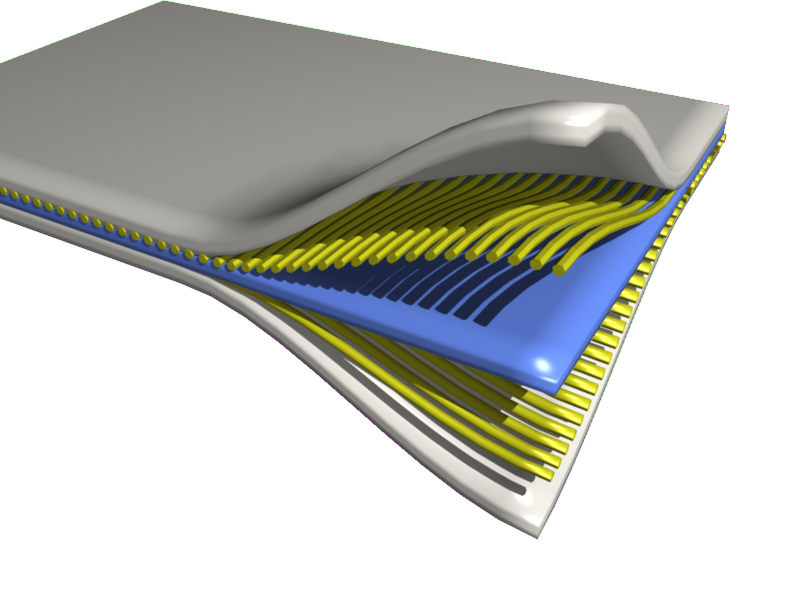
Composite lay-up

== Advantages ==
Vacuum bag moulding offers several notable benefits:

- Improved mechanical properties due to better resin-fiber compaction.
- Reduced voids and air pockets in the laminate.
- Greater uniformity in thickness and resin distribution.
- Cleaner and safer work environment compared to open-moulding methods.

== Limitations ==
Despite its advantages, the method has certain drawbacks:

- Labour-intensive: Requires careful setup and monitoring.
- Material limitations: Not suitable for all types of resins or large parts without extra tooling.
- Complexity: Tight sealing and pressure control demand skilled operators.
