= Daggerboard =

Retractable centreboard for sailing craft

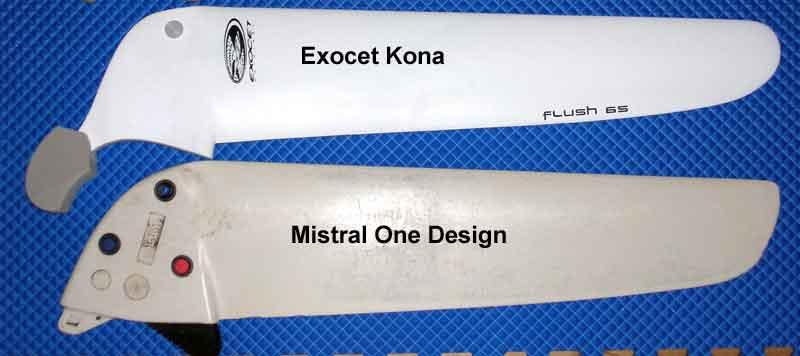
Windsurf daggerboards from Exocet Kona and Mistral One Design

A Laser has a daggerboard, which can be pulled up through the centre of the hull.

A daggerboard is a retractable centreboard used by various sailing craft. While other types of centreboard may pivot to retract, a daggerboard slides in a casing. The shape of the daggerboard converts the forward motion into a windward lift, countering the leeward push of the sail. The theoretical centre of lateral resistance is on the trailing edge of the daggerboard.

== General ==
A daggerboard is a removable vertical keel that is inserted through a "trunk" in the center of a vessel's hull, usually amidships. Daggerboards are usually found in small sailing craft such as day sailers, which are easily handled by a single person. Daggerboards are not usually ballasted but are locked in place by a clip or pin. Unlike a centreboard, which can be set at different angles to the hull of the boat, daggerboards are generally limited to a single perpendicular position relative to the hull. If a daggerboard is located off center, it is called a leeboard or a bilgeboard.

The characteristic which differentiates daggerboards from other centerboards and swing keels is that daggerboards are easily removable, even when the boat is underway. Centerboards and swing keels, common alternatives to fixed keels, can pivot up and down but are fixed to the hull. The freedom of movement of dagger- and centerboards allows them to swing or slide up into the hull of the boat, which is advantageous when sailing in shallow waters. The pivoting centerboard or swing keel can swing up when it strikes an object which helps prevents the sort of damage to which fixed keels or daggerboards are subject. Daggerboards can be raised and lowered as needed but will generally be damaged if not retracted before impact with the bottom or with floating objects.

Many small sailboats use a daggerboard instead of a fixed keel. This allows these boats to be more easily moved on trailers, sailed in shallow waters, and easily beached. Daggerboards also afford an opportunity to reduce drag when racing because they can be retracted when not needed (i.e. when sailing downwind or in very light winds).

Catamarans are stable because of their multihull designs which utilize daggerboards.

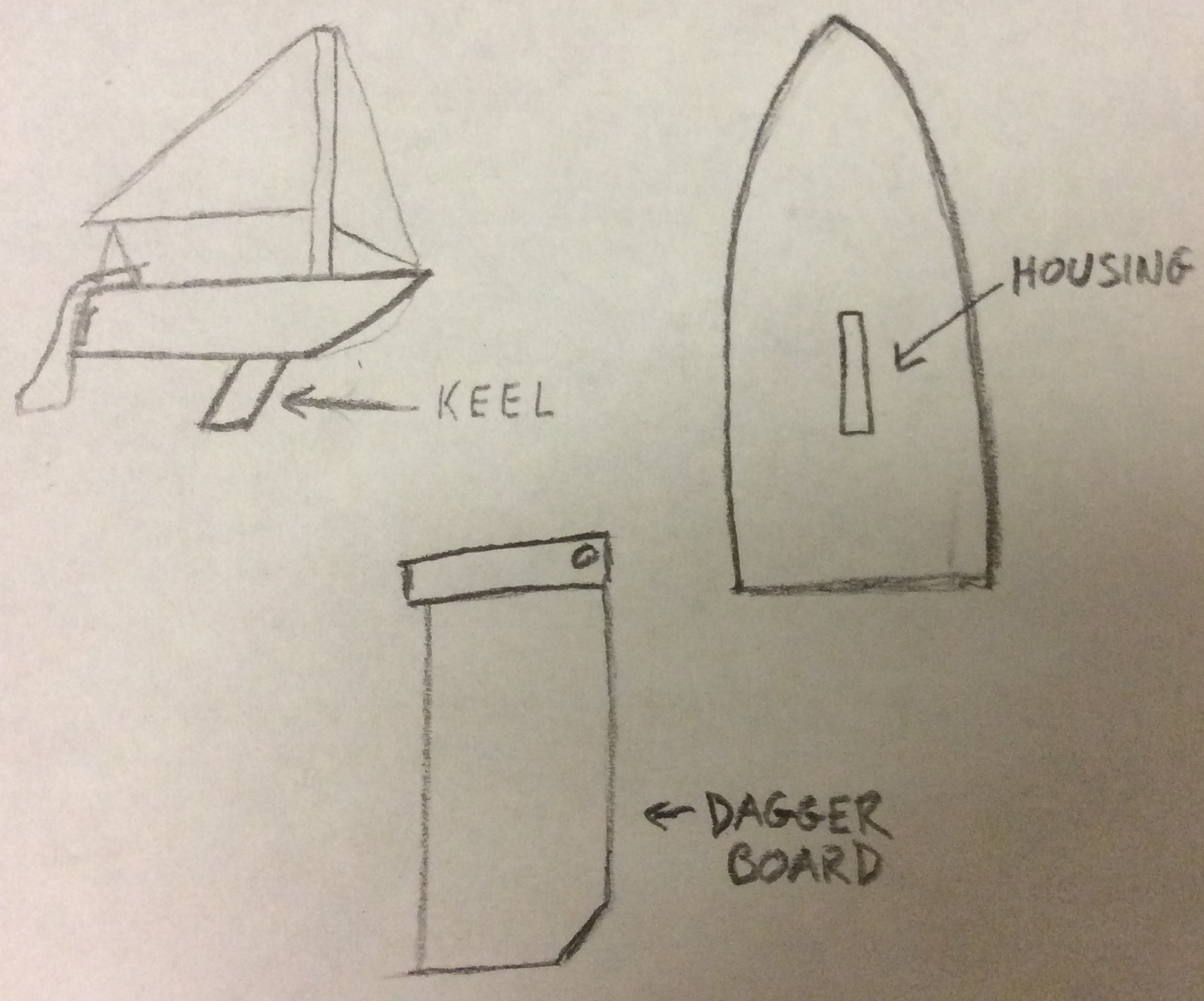
Keel is vertically removable

Daggerboards are often made of wood; the problem with wood is that wood rots over time. Alternate materials for daggerboards are metal (aluminum/steel) and fiberglass. A daggerboard boat can be costly to manufacture. If not well-made, the daggerboard will transfer vibrations from the trunk through the hull.

=== Purpose ===
The purpose of the daggerboard (or any keel) is to balance the force of the wind on the sails. Without a daggerboard or keel, a sailboat could not sail up-wind and would simply be blown sideways.

During a storm, daggerboards can help reduce the tendency of a small boat to tip over ("breach") due to waves. A catamaran in a storm would lift the leeward hull daggerboard and fully extend the upwind daggerboard. If there is no wind and an outboard motor is being used, lifting the daggerboards will ensure the least drag.

When a small sailboat flips on its side, the keel can also be used to right the boat. Standing on the keel gives the sailor additional leverage to roll the hull upright. The centerboard, daggerboard, or bilgeboard can be used as a platform upon which to stand, providing increased leverage, in the event the dinghy overturns via a capsize or turtle.

=== How it works ===
Because water is denser than air, the force generated by wind against the much larger surface area of the sails can be equalized by the force of a relatively small daggerboard pushing in the water below the hull. A daggerboard fits into a trunk that runs through the hull of the rig. When the board is in the trunk it keeps the water out while in use due to how tightly wedged it is. It is held in place by a pin on the forward end or a shock cord. The daggerboard puts a counterforce from the wind pushing on the sails. Daggerboards are often long and thin to reduce drag and increase effective lift, thus providing a better lift-to-drag ratio.

=== History ===
In 2008, a 55-foot-long (17 m) daggerboard ship was found using deep scan sonar equipment off the southern shore of Lake Ontario, the only such vessel known to have been found in the Great Lakes. Vessels of this type were used for a short time in the early 19th century.

In the early 19th century daggerboards were infrequently being used on American schooners. These schooners were used for nearby coastal trade of cotton, wheat, and apples. A sunken 1833 daggerboard schooner was found in the great lakes with the help of sonar equipment. Knowing this, daggerboards have been around since late in the 17th century. Daggerboards can be found on monohulls which is the classic sailboat and multihulls called catamarans. An early form of daggerboard was a “sliding keel”, designed by John Schank and used in HMS Trial in 1790.

Daggerboards come in all different shapes and sizes, some curved or s-shaped. Curved daggerboards started to appear thirty to forty years ago. The first prototype was made in 1985 by Ian Farrier. The benefits of vertical lift generated by curved daggerboards are nominal. When actually sailing, curved daggerboards - not to be confused with hydrofoils - do not make a drastic change.

== Boats with daggerboards ==
Generally, daggerboards are used on dinghies, and smaller rigs such as 10 to 40 feet for racing but there is a large number of custom and semi-custom catamaran builders who offer daggerboards as an option. Daggerboard rigs may be faster than fixed keels because fixed keels have so much hydrodynamic drag by the shape. Some makes which utilize a daggerboard design are: The Sunfish (dinghy), Mirror Dinghy, Laser, Vanguard 15.
