= Marsh Hen =

Cat rigged sharpie sailboat

- M H

Development
- Designer: Reuben Trane
- Location: United States
- Year: 1981
- No. built: 40
- Builder: Florida Bay Boat Company
- Role: Cruiser
- Name: Marsh Hen

Boat
- Displacement: 650 lb (295 kg)
- Draft: 3.25 ft (0.99 m) with centerboard down

Hull
- Type: Monohull
- Construction: Fiberglass
- LOA: 17.33 ft (5.28 m)
- LWL: 16.25 ft (4.95 m)
- Beam: 6.25 ft (1.91 m)
- Engine: Outboard motor

Hull appendages
- Keel: centerboard
- Rudder: transom-mounted rudder

Rig
- Rig type: cat rig

Sails
- Sailplan: Sprit rigged catboat
- Mainsail area: 155.00 sq ft (14.400 m^{2})
- Total sail area: 155.00 sq ft (14.400 m^{2})

The Marsh Hen is a sharpie with a catboat spritsail rig built from 1981 to 2003 by several US companies including Custom Fiberglass and Sovereign America.

It is a centerboard boat, built predominantly of fiberglass, with teak wood trim. The double-ended, canoe-type hull has a plumb stem, an angled transom, a shallow-draft, transom-hung rudder controlled by a teak tiller and retractable centerboard. It displaces 650 lb (295 kg).

The boat has a draft of 3.25 ft (0.99 m) with the centerboard extended and 6 in (15 cm) with it retracted.

The boat can be fitted with a well-mounted outboard motor and can be rowed.

The open-boat design has a dodger that was factory-supplied as standard equipment. This acts as a sort of cabin top to provide sleeping accommodation for two people. The boat has a built-in ice chest and a portable-type head along with six lockers for stowage.

For sailing the design is equipped with built-in flotation and a self-bailing cockpit.

In a 1994 review Richard Sherwood wrote that the "hull shape has evolved from working boats of the Chesapeake, and the rudder and spritsail rig are also traditional. The Marsh Hen was designed as a pocket cruiser."

Related development

- Bay Hen 21
- Peep Hen 14
