= Sovereign Princess 24 =

1980s American recreational keelboat

Development
- Designer: Arthur Edmunds
- Location: United States
- Year: 1981
- Builder: Sovereign Yachts
- Role: Cruiser

Boat
- Displacement: 3,250 lb (1,474 kg)
- Draft: 2.33 ft (0.71 m)

Hull
- Type: monohull
- Construction: fiberglass
- LOA: 24.00 ft (7.32 m)
- LWL: 18.50 ft (5.64 m)
- Beam: 8.00 ft (2.44 m)
- Engine: outboard motor

Hull appendages
- Keel: fin keel
- Ballast: 1,350 lb (612 kg)
- Rudder: transom-mounted rudder

Rig
- Rig type: Bermuda rig
- I foretriangle height: 28.42 ft (8.66 m)
- J foretriangle base: 10.20 ft (3.11 m)
- P mainsail luff: 23.00 ft (7.01 m)
- E mainsail foot: 8.50 ft (2.59 m)

Sails
- Sailplan: masthead sloop
- Mainsail area: 97.75 sq ft (9.081 m^{2})
- Jib/genoa area: 144.94 sq ft (13.465 m^{2})
- Total sail area: 242.69 sq ft (22.547 m^{2})

The Sovereign Princess 24 is an American sailboat that was designed by Arthur Edmunds as a cruiser and first built in 1981.

Like the Sovereign 23 family of boats and the Sovereign 7.0, the Sovereign Princess 24 is a development of Edmunds' S2 7.0 design, using the same hull molds, with a new deck design.

== Production ==
The design was built by Sovereign Yachts in Port Richey, Florida, United States, starting in 1981, but it is now out of production.

== Design ==
The Sovereign Princess 24 is a recreational keelboat, built predominantly of fiberglass, with wood trim. It has a masthead sloop rig with a 12 in (30 cm) bowsprit, a raked stem, a plumb transom, a transom-hung rudder controlled by a tiller or optional wheel and a fixed fin shoal draft keel or optional deeper keel. It displaces 3,250 lb (1,474 kg) and carries 1,350 lb (612 kg) of ballast.

The boat has a draft of 2.33 ft (0.71 m) with the standard keel and 3.67 ft (1.12 m) with the optional deeper draft keel.

The boat is normally fitted with a small outboard motor for docking and maneuvering.

The design has sleeping accommodation for four people, with a double "V"-berth in the bow cabin and two straight settee berths in the main cabin. The galley is located on the starboard side of the companionway ladder. The galley is equipped with a two-burner stove, icebox and a sink. The head is located on the port side of the companionway.

For sailing the design is equipped with a jib or one of a series of larger genoas.

The design has a hull speed of 5.76 kn (10.67 km/h).
