= S2 22 =

1980s US recreational keelboat

Development
- Designer: Don Wennersten, Graham & Schlageter
- Location: United States
- Year: 1985
- No. built: 21
- Builder: S2 Yachts
- Role: Cruiser

Boat
- Displacement: 2,300 lb (1,043 kg)
- Draft: 3.50 ft (1.07 m)

Hull
- Type: monohull
- Construction: fiberglass
- LOA: 22.00 ft (6.71 m)
- LWL: 18.75 ft (5.72 m)
- Beam: 8.00 ft (2.44 m)
- Engine: outboard motor

Hull appendages
- Keel: wing keel
- Ballast: 700 lb (318 kg)
- Rudder: transom-mounted rudder

Rig
- Rig type: Bermuda rig
- I foretriangle height: 26.00 ft (7.92 m)
- J foretriangle base: 7.80 ft (2.38 m)
- P mainsail luff: 25.30 ft (7.71 m)
- E mainsail foot: 10.00 ft (3.05 m)

Sails
- Sailplan: fractional rigged sloop
- Mainsail area: 126.50 sq ft (11.752 m^{2})
- Jib/genoa area: 101.40 sq ft (9.420 m^{2})
- Total sail area: 227.90 sq ft (21.173 m^{2})

The S2 22 is a recreational keelboat built by S2 Yachts in Holland, Michigan, United States, from 1985 until 1987, with 21 boats completed.

The S2 22 is derived from the 1983 Graham & Schlageter-designed S2 6.9, which itself was a development of the 1980 Wennersten S2 6.7 design.

The S2 22 is built predominantly of solid fiberglass, with wood trim. It has a fractional sloop rig, a raked stem, a plumb transom, a transom-hung rudder controlled by a tiller and a fixed wing keel. It displaces 2,300 lb (1,043 kg) and carries 700 lb (318 kg) of ballast.

The boat has a draft of 3.50 ft (1.07 m) with the standard keel and is normally fitted with a small outboard motor for docking and maneuvering.

The design has a hull speed of 5.8 kn (10.7 km/h).
