= G&S =

G&S may refer to:

- Gilbert and Sullivan, a 19th-century comic opera partnership
- Gavin & Stacey, a BBC comedy TV series
- Geek & Sundry, a commercial YouTube Channel and multimedia production company.
- Graham & Schlageter, an American sailboat design firm active from 1975 to 1989
- Geography & Space, a YouTube channel.
