= Mud hen (disambiguation) =

Mud hen is an alternative name for the American coot (Fulica americana).

Mud hen or mudhen may also refer to:

== Birds ==
- Hawaiian coot, another species of Fulica
- Hawaiian gallinule, another bird species within the Rallidae family

== Nicknames ==
- Mud hen, a lake trout with a particularly dark coloration
- Mud Hen, the U.S. Air Force nickname for the F-15E Strike Eagle
- Mud Hen 17, a sailboat named after the American coot
- Mudhen, a nickname for the D&RGW K-27 locomotive
- Project Mudhen, a Central Intelligence Agency project focused on columnist Jack Anderson
- Toledo Mud Hens, a minor league baseball team named for the bird

== See also ==
- Mud Hen Lake (disambiguation)
