= S2 8.0 A =

Sailboat class

Development
- Designer: Arthur Edmunds and Leon Slikkers
- Location: United States
- Year: 1974
- No. built: 40
- Builder: S2 Yachts
- Role: Cruiser
- Name: S2 8.0 A

Boat
- Displacement: 4,600 lb (2,087 kg)
- Draft: 2.42 ft (0.74 m)

Hull
- Type: monohull
- Construction: fiberglass
- LOA: 26.00 ft (7.92 m)
- LWL: 21.42 ft (6.53 m)
- Beam: 8.00 ft (2.44 m)
- Engine: Universal Atomic 4 gasoline engine

Hull appendages
- Keel: shoal draft fin keel
- Ballast: 1,800 lb (816 kg)
- Rudder: internally-mounted spade-type

Rig
- Rig type: Bermuda rig

Sails
- Sailplan: masthead sloop
- Total sail area: 282.00 sq ft (26.199 m^{2})

The S2 8.0 A is an American sailboat that was designed by Arthur Edmunds and Leon Slikkers as a cruiser and first built in 1974. The designation indicates the approximate length overall in meters.

The S2 8.0 A was the first of three 8.0-designated designs that all use the same hull, but different decks. The 8.0 A was replaced by the S2 8.0 B in 1976, which has a longer cabin coach house. The 1975 S2 8.0 C model has a center cockpit. The 8.0 A was initially marketed as the "8.0 Sloop" and was later known as the 8.0 A to avoid confusion with the later models that replaced it in production.

== Production ==
The design was built by S2 Yachts in Holland, Michigan, United States from 1974 until 1975, with 40 boats completed, but it is now out of production.

== Design ==
The S2 8.0 A is a recreational keelboat, built predominantly of fiberglass. It has a masthead sloop rig, a raked stem, a plumb transom, an internally mounted spade-type rudder controlled by a tiller and a fixed shoal draft fin keel or optional deep draft fin keel. It displaces 4,600 lb (2,087 kg) and carries 1,800 lb (816 kg) of lead ballast.

The boat has a draft of 2.42 ft (0.74 m) with the standard shoal draft keel and 4.00 ft (1.22 m) with the optional deep draft keel.

The boat is fitted with a Universal Atomic 4 gasoline engine for docking and maneuvering. The fuel tank holds 21 U.S. gallons (79 L; 17 imp gal).

The design has sleeping accommodation for four people, with a double "V"-berth in the bow cabin and a straight settee in the main cabin on the port side that opens into a double berth. The main cabin also has a folding table that hinges down from a cabin bulkhead. The galley is located on the starboard side, just forward of the companionway ladder. The galley is L-shaped and is equipped with a two-burner stove, an ice box and a sink. The head is located just aft of the bow cabin on the port side.

The design has a hull speed of 6.2 kn (11.5 km/h).

== Reception ==
In a 1976 review in Boating magazine Dick Rath and John Schieffelin wrote, "In appearance, the S2 8.0 Meter takes a little getting used to—she is both sleek and stout looking. In order to achieve standing headroom below, Edmunds and S2 had to give her startlingly high freeboard, plus a prominent trunk cabin. But the wallsided effect is softened considerably through the use of a double cove stripe, and the height of the trunk cabin is disguised by its modern, curving, bubble shape that flows into the cockpit coamings. Her rig adds a touch of the racing sailboat to her—quite tall, with a small mainsail, large foretriangle, and black anodized spars, it shows an IOR influence. With her pleasingly curved sheer, aggressively raked bow, and chopped-off stern, the S2 8.0 Meter looks rather racy and contemporary for an out-and-out cruising boat."
