= Hunter 49 =

Sailboat class

Development
- Designer: Glenn Henderson & Hunter Design Team
- Location: United States
- Year: 2007
- Builder: Hunter Marine
- Name: Hunter 49

Boat
- Displacement: 32,813 lb (14,884 kg)
- Draft: 5.50 ft (1.68 m)

Hull
- Type: Monohull
- Construction: Fiberglass
- LOA: 49.92 ft (15.22 m)
- LWL: 43.83 ft (13.36 m)
- Beam: 14.75 ft (4.50 m)
- Engine: Yanmar 75 hp (56 kW) diesel engine

Hull appendages
- Keel: wing keel
- Ballast: 12,544 lb (5,690 kg)
- Rudder: internally-mounted spade-type rudder

Rig
- Rig type: Bermuda rig
- I foretriangle height: 54.58 ft (16.64 m)
- J foretriangle base: 16.50 ft (5.03 m)
- P mainsail luff: 51.58 ft (15.72 m)
- E mainsail foot: 21.83 ft (6.65 m)

Sails
- Sailplan: Fractional B&R rigged sloop
- Mainsail area: 563.00 sq ft (52.304 m^{2})
- Jib/genoa area: 450.29 sq ft (41.833 m^{2})
- Total sail area: 1,013.28 sq ft (94.137 m^{2})

The Hunter 49 is an American sailboat that was designed by Glenn Henderson and the Hunter Design Team as a cruiser and first built in 2007.

== Production ==
The design was built by Hunter Marine in the United States, starting in 2007, but it is now out of production.

== Design ==
The Hunter 49 is a recreational keelboat, built predominantly of fiberglass, with wood trim. The hull has a solid fiberglass laminate bottom, with balsa-cored sides. It has a fractional sloop B&R rig, a stainless steel arch-mounted mainsheet traveler, a raked stem, a walk-through reverse transom with a swimming platform and folding ladder, an internally mounted spade-type rudder controlled by dual wheels and a fixed wing keel. A deep draft fin keel was optional. The wing keel version displaces 32,813 lb (14,884 kg) and carries 12,544 lb (5,690 kg) of ballast, while the fin keel version displaces 35,661 lb (16,176 kg) and carries 11,216 lb (5,087 kg) of ballast.

The boat has a draft of 5.50 ft (1.68 m) with the standard wing keel and 7.00 ft (2.13 m) with the optional deep draft keel.

The boat is fitted with a Japanese Yanmar turbocharged diesel engine of 75 hp (56 kW), with a 100 hp (75 kW) engine optional. The fuel tank holds 150 U.S. gallons (570 L; 120 imp gal) and the fresh water tank has a capacity of 200 U.S. gallons (760 L; 170 imp gal). There is a 52 U.S. gallons (200 L; 43 imp gal) holding tank.

Factory standard equipment included a roller furling self-tacking genoa, full-roach mainsail, anodized spars, an emergency tiller, electric anchor winch, marine VHF radio, knotmeter, depth sounder, AM/FM radio DVD player and CD player with four speakers, dual anchor rollers, hot and cold water transom shower, fog bell and air horn, teak interior and cabin sole, two fully enclosed heads with showers, private forward and aft cabins, a dinette table that converts to a double berth, complete set of kitchen dishes, microwave oven, front-loading refrigerator, dual sinks, three-burner gimbaled liquid petroleum gas stove and oven with a range hood and life jackets. Factory options included a deep draft keel, bow thruster, electric sail handling winch, mast-furling mainsail, a four cabin layout, desk and work bench in place of one aft cabin, air conditioning, ice maker or wine cooler (but not both), bimini top, dodger, clothing washer and drier and leather cushions. The headroom in the salon below decks is 81 in (206 cm).

The design has a hull speed of 8.87 kn (16.43 km/h).

== Operational history ==
In a 2006 review of the first Hunter 49 built, Bill Springer of Sail magazine wrote of its sailing qualities, "I was impressed with the 49’s upwind performance in light air. In 8 to 12 knots of wind and flat water, we logged 7 knots of boatspeed and tacked through 80 degrees. It took some time to accelerate out of the tacks, but once we got the sails dialed in, the boat tracked well and held consistent speed. Broad- and beam-reaching through the night, with winds in the high 20s, speeds were consistently in the 8-to-9-knot range and occasionally topped 10 knots. Some trouble with the autopilot had us hand-steering through the windiest hours." He found some faults with the design, "the steering did feel a bit stiff, the grabrails in the saloon had some give, and the recessed lighting near the companionway may not appeal to everyone. Overall, the boat was condo-comfortable, but also handled the passage without trouble."

Cruising World writer Mark Pillsbury reviewed the first boat built in 2007 and wrote about its sailing qualities, "A stiff boat, the 49 heeled just moderately in 15-plus knots of wind as we scooted north along the New Jersey shore. The high, 4-foot-8-inch freeboard makes boarding from a floating dock a challenge (Pettengill bought a small step stool to keep aboard), but it ensures a dry cockpit, even when the breeze pipes up. Sitting to leeward on a seat designed to let the helmsman lean back against the lifelines and pushpit with feet inboard and a knee on either side of the wheel, I found the boat a pleasure to sail. The helm was balanced, and the boat tracked nicely on a close reach through confused seas with the GPS at 7 knots and better in about 17 knots of true wind."

== See also ==
- List of sailing boat types

Similar sailboats

- C&C 50
