= Sovereign 7.0 =

1980s American recreational keelboat

Development
- Designer: Arthur Edmunds
- Location: United States
- Year: 1980
- Builder: Sovereign Yachts
- Role: Cruiser
- Name: Sovereign 7.0

Boat
- Displacement: 2.33 lb (1 kg)
- Draft: 2.33 ft (0.71 m)

Hull
- Type: monohull
- Construction: fiberglass
- LOA: 23.00 ft (7.01 m)
- LWL: 18.50 ft (5.64 m)
- Beam: 8.00 ft (2.44 m)
- Engine: outboard motor

Hull appendages
- Keel: fin keel
- Ballast: 1,350 lb (612 kg)
- Rudder: transom-mounted rudder

Rig
- Rig type: Bermuda rig
- I foretriangle height: 29.00 ft (8.84 m)
- J foretriangle base: 9.90 ft (3.02 m)
- P mainsail luff: 23.00 ft (7.01 m)
- E mainsail foot: 8.50 ft (2.59 m)

Sails
- Sailplan: masthead sloop
- Mainsail area: 97.75 sq ft (9.081 m^{2})
- Jib/genoa area: 143.55 sq ft (13.336 m^{2})
- Total sail area: 241.30 sq ft (22.418 m^{2})

The Sovereign 7.0 is an American sailboat that was designed by Arthur Edmunds as a cruiser and first built in 1980.

The Sovereign 7.0 is a development of Edmonds' S2 7.0 design, using the same hull molds. The Sovereign 23 and Sovereign Princess 24 were also built from the same molds.

== Production ==
The design was built by Sovereign Yachts in the United States, starting in 1980, but it is now out of production.

== Design ==
The Sovereign 7.0 is a recreational keelboat, built predominantly of hand-laid fiberglass, with wood trim. It has a masthead sloop rig, a raked stem, a plumb transom, a transom-hung rudder controlled by a tiller and a fixed shoal-draft fin keel. It displaces 3,350 lb (1,520 kg) and carries 1,350 lb (612 kg) of lead ballast.

The boat has a draft of 2.33 ft (0.71 m) with the standard keel.

The boat is normally fitted with a small outboard motor for docking and maneuvering, although an inboard diesel engine was a factory option.

The design has sleeping accommodation for four people, with a double "V"-berth in the bow cabin and two straight settee berths in the main cabin. The galley is located on the starboard side of the companionway ladder and is equipped with an icebox, a stainless steel sink and an optional stove. The enclosed head is located on the port side of the companionway. The cabin sole is teak and holly and the cabin headroom is 64 in (163 cm).

For sailing the design may be equipped with a jib or a number of larger genoas.

The design has a hull speed of 5.76 kn (10.67 km/h).

== Operational history ==
In a 1979 review in Cruising World, noted, "the Sovereign 7.0 Meter is a cruising sloop with a complete inventory of running gear. The hand-laid hull has a long, shoal-draft keel with lead ballast providing stiff sailing and self-righting ability. The deep freeboard gives an exceptionally dry boat and excellent sea-handling capability."
