= Sovereign 23 =

1980s American recreational keelboat

Development
- Designer: Sovereign Design Group
- Location: United States
- Year: 1981
- Builder: Sovereign Yachts
- Role: Cruiser
- Name: Sovereign 23

Boat
- Displacement: 3,250 lb (1,474 kg)
- Draft: 2.33 ft (0.71 m)

Hull
- Type: monohull
- Construction: fiberglass
- LOA: 23.00 ft (7.01 m)
- LWL: 18.50 ft (5.64 m)
- Beam: 8.00 ft (2.44 m)
- Engine: outboard motor

Hull appendages
- Keel: fin keel
- Ballast: 1,350 lb (612 kg)
- Rudder: transom-mounted rudder

Rig
- Rig type: Bermuda rig
- I foretriangle height: 28.42 ft (8.66 m)
- J foretriangle base: 10.20 ft (3.11 m)
- P mainsail luff: 23.00 ft (7.01 m)
- E mainsail foot: 8.50 ft (2.59 m)

Sails
- Sailplan: masthead sloop
- Mainsail area: 97.75 sq ft (9.081 m^{2})
- Jib/genoa area: 144.94 sq ft (13.465 m^{2})
- Total sail area: 242.69 sq ft (22.547 m^{2})

Racing
- PHRF: 252

The Sovereign 23 and Sovereign 24 are a family of American sailboats that was designed by Arthur Edmunds as cruisers and first built in 1981.

The boat was also sold as the Sovereign 23 Adventure and a simplified, budget version with a different deck was sold as the Sovereign Antares 24.

The Sovereign 23 and 24 are developments of Edmunds' S2 7.0, using the same hull mold, as are the Sovereign 7.0 and the Sovereign Princess 24.

== Production ==
The designs were built by Sovereign Yachts in the United States, from 1981 until 1996, but it is now out of production.

== Design ==
The Sovereign 23 and 24 are recreational keelboats, built predominantly of fiberglass, with wood trim. They have masthead sloop rigs, raked stems, plumb transoms, transom-hung rudders controlled by tillers and a fixed fin keel or shoal draft keel. They displace 3,250 lb (1,474 kg) and carry 1,350 lb (612 kg) of ballast. The Sovereign 24 differs in having a 12 in (30 cm) bowsprit added.

The boats have a draft of 3.67 ft (1.12 m) with the standard keel and 2.33 ft (0.71 m) with the optional shoal draft keel.

The boats are normally fitted with a small 3 to 6 hp (2 to 4 kW) outboard motor for docking and maneuvering.

The design two different factory interior layouts. Interior A has sleeping accommodation for four people, with a double "V"-berth in the bow cabin and two a straight settee berths in the main cabin. The galley is located on both sides of the companionway ladder, with a two-burner stove to starboard and a sink to port. The head is located on the port side beside the galley and has a privacy door.

Interior B also has sleeping accommodation for four people, with a double "V"-berth in the bow cabin and two straight settee berths in the main cabin. The galley is located on both sides of the companionway ladder, with a two-burner stove to starboard and a sink to port. The head is located in the bow cabin on the port side.

In both layouts the cabin headroom is 67 in (170 cm).

For sailing the design may be equipped with a jib or one of a series of larger genoas

The design has a PHRF racing average handicap of 252 and a hull speed of 5.8 kn (10.7 km/h).

== Operational history ==
In a 2010 review Steve Henkel wrote, "Here's one of those boats that started life as a 23-footer, and a year or two later, without changing the hull, the marketers deemed that the boat had become a 24-footer, belatedly deciding to add the bowsprit as part of the length (which, of course, is not usual industry practice) ... Best features: Headroom and cabin space are very good for a 23-footer. Worst features: The statistics and specifications given in various Sovereign brochures are so inconsistent that we can't help but wonder about the accuracy of the company's claimed specifications. Be cautious before buying."
