= Antares 17 =

Sailboat class

Development
- Location: United States
- Year: 1987
- Builder: Sovereign Yachts
- Role: Day sailer-cruiser
- Name: Antares 17

Boat
- Displacement: 1,150 lb (522 kg)
- Draft: 1.83 ft (0.56 m)

Hull
- Type: monohull
- Construction: fiberglass
- LOA: 17.00 ft (5.18 m)
- LWL: 14.50 ft (4.42 m)
- Beam: 7.00 ft (2.13 m)
- Engine: outboard motor

Hull appendages
- Keel: fin keel
- Ballast: 480 lb (218 kg)
- Rudder: transom-mounted rudder

Rig
- Rig type: Bermuda rig

Sails
- Sailplan: fractional rigged sloop
- Total sail area: 138.00 sq ft (12.821 m^{2})

The Antares 17 is an American trailerable sailboat that was designed as a daysailer and pocket cruiser and first built in 1987.

The Antares 17 is a development of the Sovereign 17, with a new deck design.

== Production ==
The design was built by Sovereign Yachts in the United States, starting in 1987, but it is now out of production.

== Design ==
The Antares 17 is a recreational keelboat, built predominantly of fiberglass. It has a fractional sloop rig; a cuddy cabin; a spooned, raked stem, an angled transom, a transom-hung rudder controlled by a tiller and a fixed fin keel or stub keel and centerboard. It displaces 1,150 lb (522 kg) and carries 480 lb (218 kg) of ballast.

The fixed keel model of the boat has a draft of 1.83 ft (0.56 m).

The boat is normally fitted with a small outboard motor in a stern well, for docking and maneuvering.

The design has sleeping accommodation for two people, with two berths in the open cockpit. The galley is located in the cuddy cabin, with a stove to port and a sink to starboard, with the portable-type head in between. An ice chest may be stowed in the forepeak.

The design has a hull speed of 5.1 kn (9.4 km/h).

== See also ==
- List of sailing boat types
