= S2 27 =

Sailboat class

Development
- Designer: Graham & Schlageter
- Location: United States
- Year: 1985
- No. built: 85
- Builder: S2 Yachts
- Role: Cruiser
- Name: S2 27

Boat
- Displacement: 5,000 lb (2,268 kg)
- Draft: 4.75 ft (1.45 m)

Hull
- Type: monohull
- Construction: fiberglass
- LOA: 26.58 ft (8.10 m)
- LWL: 23.33 ft (7.11 m)
- Beam: 9.25 ft (2.82 m)
- Engine: inboard engine

Hull appendages
- Keel: fin keel
- Ballast: 2,100 lb (953 kg)
- Rudder: transom-mounted rudder

Rig
- Rig type: Bermuda rig
- I foretriangle height: 34.00 ft (10.36 m)
- J foretriangle base: 10.00 ft (3.05 m)
- P mainsail luff: 28.67 ft (8.74 m)
- E mainsail foot: 12.00 ft (3.66 m)

Sails
- Sailplan: masthead sloop
- Mainsail area: 172.02 sq ft (15.981 m^{2})
- Jib/genoa area: 170.00 sq ft (15.794 m^{2})
- Total sail area: 342.02 sq ft (31.775 m^{2})

The S2 27 is an American sailboat that was designed by Graham & Schlageter as a cruiser and first built in 1985.

== Production ==
The design was built by S2 Yachts in Holland, Michigan, United States from 1985 until 1987 with 85 boats completed, but it is now out of production.

== Design ==
The S2 27 is a recreational keelboat, built predominantly of balsa-cored AME 4000 resin fiberglass, with wood trim. It has a masthead sloop rig, a raked stem, a plumb transom, a transom-hung rudder controlled by a tiller and a fixed fin keel. It displaces 5,000 lb (2,268 kg) and carries 2,100 lb (953 kg) of ballast.

The boat has a draft of 4.75 ft (1.45 m) with the standard keel and is fitted with an inboard engine for docking and maneuvering.

The design has sleeping accommodation for four people, with a double "V"-berth in the bow cabin, an L-shaped settee and a straight settee in the main cabin. The galley is located on the port side just forward of the companionway ladder. The galley is U-shaped and is equipped with a two-burner stove, an ice box and a sink. The head is located at the companionway on the starboard side. Cabin headroom is 72 in (183 cm).

For sailing downwind the design may be equipped with a symmetrical spinnaker.

The design has a hull speed of 6.47 kn (11.98 km/h).

== See also ==
- List of sailing boat types
