= Sovereign 30 =

Sailboat of which only one was built

Development
- Designer: Sovereign Design Group
- Location: United States
- Year: 1998
- No. built: one
- Builder: Sovereign America
- Role: Cruiser
- Name: Sovereign 30

Boat
- Displacement: 6,800 lb (3,084 kg)
- Draft: 3.33 ft (1.01 m)

Hull
- Type: monohull
- Construction: fiberglass
- LOA: 30.00 ft (9.14 m)
- LWL: 23.00 ft (7.01 m)
- Beam: 8.33 ft (2.54 m)
- Engine: Yanmar 18 hp (13 kW) diesel engine

Hull appendages
- Keel: fin keel
- Ballast: 2,400 lb (1,089 kg)
- Rudder: internally-mounted spade-type rudder

Rig
- Rig type: Bermuda rig
- I foretriangle height: 38.50 ft (11.73 m)
- J foretriangle base: 12.50 ft (3.81 m)
- P mainsail luff: 34.60 ft (10.55 m)
- E mainsail foot: 10.90 ft (3.32 m)

Sails
- Sailplan: cutter rigged sloop
- Mainsail area: 188.57 sq ft (17.519 m^{2})
- Jib/genoa area: 240.63 sq ft (22.355 m^{2})
- Total sail area: 429.20 sq ft (39.874 m^{2})

The Sovereign 30 is an American sailboat that was designed by the Sovereign Design Group as a cruiser and first built in 1998.

The Sovereign 30 is a development of the Sovereign 28.

== Production ==
The design was built by Sovereign America in the United States, starting in 1998, with only one prototype built, before the company went out of business. The prototype was used as a factory demonstrator and was eventually sold to a private owner.

== Design ==
The Sovereign 30 is a recreational keelboat, built predominantly of fiberglass, with wood trim. It is a cutter rigged sloop with a center cockpit, a raked stem, a plumb transom, an internally mounted spade-type rudder controlled by a wheel and a fixed fin keel. It displaces 6,800 lb (3,084 kg) and carries 2,400 lb (1,089 kg) of ballast.

The boat has a draft of 3.33 ft (1.01 m) with the standard keel and is fitted with a Japanese Yanmar diesel engine of 18 hp (13 kW) for docking and maneuvering.

The design has a bow and a stern cabin. The galley is equipped with a two-burner alcohol-fired stove and an ice box. The head is fully enclosed and includes a shower. The fresh water tank has a capacity of 20 U.S. gallons (76 L; 17 imp gal).

The boat can be transported on a three-axle trailer with surge brakes.

The design has a hull speed of 6.43 kn (11.91 km/h).
