= S2 Yachts =

Sailboat manufacturer

- Company type: Privately held company
- Industry: Boat building
- Founded: 1974
- Founder: Leon Slikkers
- Headquarters: Holland, Michigan, United States
- Key people: President: Leon Slikkers
- Products: Sailboats

S2 Yachts is an American boat builder based in Holland, Michigan. From 1974 until 1989 the company specialized in the design and manufacture of fiberglass sailboats and it continues as a builder of motorboats.

The company was founded by Leon Slikkers in 1974 and remained in business in 2019 as the parent company of Tiara Yachts.

== History ==
Slikkers had initially founded a motorboat manufacturing company, Slickcraft. He sold the company to AMF Corporation in 1969 and stayed on as president of the new AMF division until 1973, when he became disenchanted with AMF. The sale of his company to AMF included a non-compete clause that precluded Slikkers from establishing another power boat manufacturing company for a period of some years. The agreement did not include sailboats, so Slikkers founded S2 Yachts in a newly constructed plant that included strict production efficiencies and quality control mechanisms. For instance the fiberglass hulls were constructed in a climate-controlled room and remained in their molds until the majority of the interiors had been fitted, ensuring minimum deformation of the hulls. The new company hired many experienced workers and also signed up experienced boat dealers to sell the product line.

Author Steve Henkel conjectured that the new company name, S2 Yachts, indicated "Slikkers second company".

S2 Yachts hired naval architect and designer Arthur Edmunds to design several sailboats between 1974 and 1980. S2 also hired the firm of Graham & Schlageter to design the popular S2 7.9 one-design racer and many of the company's later, more racing-oriented boats for production, including the S2 6.9, S2 9.1, S2 10.3, S2 22 and the S2 35.

S2 Yachts started building power boats once the clause had expired in the late 1970s, as the Tiara Yachts line of boats. Tiara Yachts remained in business in 2019. Slikkers eventually bought back Slickcraft at a fraction of the price he had sold it for. Sailboat production ended in 1989, due to the downturn in the sailboat industry, but the company continued as a motorboat builder.

In 1989 the company was contacted by the class association for the S2 7.9, a popular sailboat racing boat. The association asked if the design could be put back into limited production and the company agreed, with a stipulation of a minimum order of ten boats to restart production. Despite an effort by the association and the S2 dealership network to drum up orders, the ten boat minimum was not met and production was not resumed. Practical Sailor magazine termed this incident, "an unfortunate commentary on the sailboat industry" and noted it marked the end of sailboat production for S2 directly. However, in 1990 and again in 1994 small production runs of S2 7.9s were constructed by S2's Tiara division.

The company had a good reputation for the quality construction of its sailboats, including good interior fit-outs. Practical Sailor noted, "the S2s were well-built. Whereas other production companies frequently cheapened or upgraded models from year to year to find marketing niches, S2 made boats to sell near the high end of the production boat market, and kept the quality at a consistent level."

In a 2011 Cruising World review, Gregg Nestor wrote that S2, "sailboats are recognized for their performance, distinctive styling, and quality craftsmanship, and during its short history, S2 Yachts produced several sailboats that are still admired."

== Boats ==
Summary of sailboats built by S2:

- S2 8.0 A 1974
- S2 7.0 1975
- S2 8.0 C 1975
- S2 6.8 1976
- S2 8.0 B 1976
- S2 11.0 A 1977
- S2 9.2 A 1977
- S2 9.2 C 1977
- S2 7.3 1978
- S2 7.9 FK 1979
- S2 6.7 1980
- S2 6.7 FK 1980
- S2 11.0 C 1980
- S2 8.5 1980
- S2 7.9 1981
- S2 10.3 1982
- S2 5.5 1982
- S2 6.9 1983
- S2 9.1 1983
- S2 8.6 1984
- S2 22 1985
- S2 27 1985
- S2 35 1986

== See also ==
- List of sailboat designers and manufacturers
