= S2 5.5 =

Sailboat class

Development
- Designer: Don Wennersten
- Location: United States
- Year: 1982
- No. built: 70
- Builder: S2 Yachts
- Role: Racer-Day sailer

Boat
- Displacement: 600 lb (272 kg)
- Draft: 4.00 ft (1.22 m) with centerboard down

Hull
- Type: monohull
- Construction: fiberglass
- LOA: 18.00 ft (5.49 m)
- LWL: 16.25 ft (4.95 m)
- Beam: 7.67 ft (2.34 m)

Hull appendages
- Keel: centerboard
- Rudder: transom-mounted rudder

Rig
- Rig type: Bermuda rig
- I foretriangle height: 19.50 ft (5.94 m)
- J foretriangle base: 6.00 ft (1.83 m)
- P mainsail luff: 23.50 ft (7.16 m)
- E mainsail foot: 10.00 ft (3.05 m)

Sails
- Sailplan: fractional rigged sloop
- Mainsail area: 117.50 sq ft (10.916 m^{2})
- Jib/genoa area: 58.50 sq ft (5.435 m^{2})
- Total sail area: 176.00 sq ft (16.351 m^{2})

The S2 5.5, also called the Grand Slam 5.5, is an American sailing dinghy that was designed by Don Wennersten as a racer and day sailer and first built in 1982. The designation indicates the approximate length overall in meters.

The design was the smallest boat S2 Yachts produced and its only dingy model.

== Production ==
The design was built by S2 Yachts in Holland, Michigan, United States from 1982 until 1983, with 70 boats completed, but it is now out of production.

== Design ==
The S2 5.5 is a recreational sailboat, built predominantly of fiberglass, with wood trim. It has a fractional sloop rig, a raked stem, a plumb transom, a transom-hung rudder controlled by a tiller and a retractable centerboard. It displaces 600 lb (272 kg) and has a small cuddy cabin for stowage.

The boat has a draft of 4.00 ft (1.22 m) with the centerboard extended. With it retracted the boat can operate in shallow water, be beached or ground transported on a trailer.

The design has a hull speed of 5.4 kn (10.0 km/h).

== See also ==
- List of sailing boat types
