= S2 9.1 =

Sailboat class

Development
- Designer: Graham & Schlageter
- Location: United States
- Year: 1983
- No. built: 127
- Builder: S2 Yachts
- Role: Racer
- Name: S2 9.1

Boat
- Displacement: 7,850 lb (3,561 kg)
- Draft: 5.50 ft (1.68 m)

Hull
- Type: monohull
- Construction: fiberglass
- LOA: 29.83 ft (9.09 m)
- LWL: 25.00 ft (7.62 m)
- Beam: 10.50 ft (3.20 m)
- Engine: Yanmar 2GM 15 hp (11 kW) diesel engine

Hull appendages
- Keel: fin keel
- Ballast: 3,200 lb (1,451 kg)
- Rudder: transom-mounted rudder

Rig
- Rig type: Bermuda rig
- I foretriangle height: 41.30 ft (12.59 m)
- J foretriangle base: 12.00 ft (3.66 m)
- P mainsail luff: 35.30 ft (10.76 m)
- E mainsail foot: 13.67 ft (4.17 m)

Sails
- Sailplan: masthead sloop
- Mainsail area: 241.28 sq ft (22.416 m^{2})
- Jib/genoa area: 247.80 sq ft (23.021 m^{2})
- Total sail area: 489.08 sq ft (45.437 m^{2})

Racing
- Class association: MORC

The S2 9.1 is an American sailboat that was designed by Graham & Schlageter as a Midget Ocean Racing Club (MORC) racer and first built in 1983. The boat was built in a variety of models. The designation indicates the approximate length overall in meters.

== Production ==
The design was built by S2 Yachts in Holland, Michigan, United States from 1983 until 1987 with 127 boats completed, but it is now out of production.

== Design ==
The S2 9.1 is a racing keelboat, built predominantly of fiberglass, with wood trim. It has a masthead sloop rig, a raked stem, a plumb transom, a transom-hung rudder controlled by a tiller and a fixed fin keel.

The boat is fitted with a Japanese Yanmar 2GM diesel engine of 15 hp (11 kW) for docking and maneuvering. The fuel tank holds 15 U.S. gallons (57 L; 12 imp gal) and the fresh water tank has a capacity of 15 U.S. gallons (57 L; 12 imp gal).

The first seven boats built were delivered to customers with a shorter mast, now known as the "9.1 SM". Owners of those boats thought the design was under-powered and a mast about 1.3 ft (0.4 m) taller, along with sails with more area were used on later boats and became the standard for the class.

== Variants ==
S2 9.1 SM
This original short mast-equipped model has a mast that is approximately 1.3 ft (0.4 m) shorter than the later standard mast. The boat has a length overall of 29.83 ft (9.1 m), a waterline length of 25.00 ft (7.6 m) and displaces 7,850 lb (3,561 kg). It has a draft of 5.50 ft (1.68 m) with the standard keel. The design has a hull speed of 6.7 kn (12.4 km/h).
S2 9.1
This model has a length overall of 29.83 ft (9.1 m), a waterline length of 25.00 ft (7.6 m), displaces 7,850 lb (3,561 kg) and carries 3,200 lb (1,451 kg) of ballast. The boat has a draft of 5.50 ft (1.68 m) with the standard fin keel. The design has a hull speed of 6.7 kn (12.4 km/h).
S2 9.1 SD
This shoal draft keel model has a length overall of 29.83 ft (9.1 m), a waterline length of 25.00 ft (7.6 m) and displaces 7,850 lb (3,561 kg). The boat has a draft of 4.50 ft (1.37 m) with the shoal draft keel. The design has a hull speed of 6.7 kn (12.4 km/h).
S2 9.1 SE
This model has a length overall of 29.83 ft (9.1 m), a waterline length of 25.83 ft (7.9 m) and displaces 7,600 lb (3,447 kg). The boat has a draft of 5.40 ft (1.65 m) with the standard keel. The design has a hull speed of 6.81 kn (12.61 km/h).

== Operational history ==
The boat is supported by an active class club that organizes racing events, the S2 9.1 Meter North American One Design Class Association.

In a 2002 review Bill Brockway reported in Sailing World, "one successful racer from Seattle says that his S2 9.1 tall-rig boat is a good all-rounder in medium air, best upwind at the upper end of a No. 1, and can sail well going deep on a downwind leg."

== See also ==
- List of sailing boat types
