= S2 8.6 =

Sailboat class

Development
- Designer: Arthur Edmunds
- Location: United States
- Year: 1983
- No. built: 150
- Builder: S2 Yachts
- Role: Cruiser
- Name: S2 8.6

Boat
- Displacement: 7,600 lb (3,447 kg)
- Draft: 4.50 ft (1.37 m)

Hull
- Type: monohull
- Construction: fiberglass
- LOA: 28.00 ft (8.53 m)
- LWL: 22.50 ft (6.86 m)
- Beam: 9.50 ft (2.90 m)
- Engine: Yanmar 2GM 20 hp (15 kW) diesel engine

Hull appendages
- Keel: fin keel
- Ballast: 3,000 lb (1,361 kg)
- Rudder: skeg-mounted/internally-mounted spade-type/transom-mounted rudder

Rig
- Rig type: Bermuda rig
- I foretriangle height: 37.00 ft (11.28 m)
- J foretriangle base: 11.00 ft (3.35 m)
- P mainsail luff: 31.00 ft (9.45 m)
- E mainsail foot: 12.00 ft (3.66 m)

Sails
- Sailplan: masthead sloop
- Mainsail area: 186.00 sq ft (17.280 m^{2})
- Jib/genoa area: 203.50 sq ft (18.906 m^{2})
- Total sail area: 389.50 sq ft (36.186 m^{2})

The S2 8.6 is an American sailboat that was designed by Arthur Edmunds as a cruiser and first built in 1983. The designation indicates the approximate length overall in meters.

== Production ==
The design was built by S2 Yachts in Holland, Michigan, United States from 1983 until 1987, with 150 boats completed, but it is now out of production.

== Design ==
The S2 8.6 is a recreational keelboat, built predominantly of hand-laid fiberglass, with wood trim. The hull is solid fiberglass, while the decks are cored with end-grain balsa. It has a masthead sloop rig, a raked stem, a reverse transom, an internally mounted spade-type rudder controlled by a tiller and a fixed fin keel. It displaces 7,600 lb (3,447 kg) and carries 3,000 lb (1,361 kg) of lead ballast.

The boat has a draft of 4.50 ft (1.37 m) with the standard keel and 3.92 ft (1.19 m) with the optional shoal draft keel.

The boat is fitted with a Japanese Yanmar 2GM 20 hp (15 kW) diesel engine for docking and maneuvering. The aluminum fuel tank holds 18 U.S. gallons (68 L; 15 imp gal).

The design has sleeping accommodation for five people, with a double "V"-berth in the bow cabin and two a straight settee berths in the main cabin, the one on the starboard side being extra long. The galley is located on the port side just forward of the companionway ladder. The galley is L-shaped and is equipped with a two-burner alcohol-fired stove, an icebox and a sink. The head is located just aft of the bow cabin on the starboard side and includes a shower. The fresh water tank has a capacity of 37 U.S. gallons (140 L; 31 imp gal).

The design has a hull speed of 6.36 kn (11.78 km/h).

== Operational history ==
In a 2011 Cruising World review Gregg Nestor wrote, "the S2 8.6 is a very comfortable and easily managed coastal cruiser and club racer. It’s relatively stiff, its helm feels balanced, and it tracks well. On most points of sail, it compares favorably with other boats of similar size and type."

== See also ==
- List of sailing boat types
