= Sovereign 26 =

1980s US recreational keelboat

Development
- Designer: Sovereign Design Group
- Location: United States
- Year: 1982
- Builder: Sovereign Yachts
- Role: Cruiser
- Name: Sovereign 26

Boat
- Displacement: 3,200 lb (1,451 kg)
- Draft: 2.17 ft (0.66 m)

Hull
- Type: monohull
- Construction: fiberglass
- LOA: 26.00 ft (7.92 m)
- LWL: 23.00 ft (7.01 m)
- Beam: 8.00 ft (2.44 m)

Hull appendages
- Keel: fin keel
- Ballast: 1,000 lb (454 kg)

Rig
- Rig type: Bermuda rig

Sails
- Sailplan: masthead sloop

The Sovereign 26 is an American sailboat that was designed by the Sovereign Design Group as a cruiser and first built in 1982.

== Production ==
The design was built by Sovereign Yachts in the United States, starting in 1982, but it is now out of production.

== Design ==
The Sovereign 26 is a recreational keelboat, built predominantly of fiberglass. It has a masthead sloop rig and a fixed fin keel. It displaces 3,200 lb (1,451 kg) and carries 1,000 lb (454 kg) of ballast.

The boat has a draft of 2.17 ft (0.66 m) with the standard shoal draft keel.

The design has a hull speed of 6.43 kn (11.91 km/h).
