= Captiva 35 =

Sailboat class

Development
- Designer: Walter Scott
- Location: United States
- Year: 1980
- Builders: Captiva Yachts; Sovereign Yachts
- Role: Cruiser
- Name: Captiva 35

Boat
- Displacement: 15,100 lb (6,849 kg)
- Draft: 5.17 ft (1.58 m)

Hull
- Type: monohull
- Construction: fiberglass
- LOA: 34.75 ft (10.59 m)
- LWL: 29.58 ft (9.02 m)
- Beam: 11.67 ft (3.56 m)
- Engine: inboard motor

Hull appendages
- Keel: fin keel
- Ballast: 4,300 lb (1,950 kg)
- Rudder: skeg-mounted rudder

Rig
- Rig type: Bermuda rig

Sails
- Sailplan: masthead sloop
- Total sail area: 550.00 sq ft (51.097 m^{2})

The Captiva 35 is an American sailboat that was designed by Walter Scott as a cruiser and first built in 1980.

The Captiva 35 design was developed into the Allmand 35 in 1981.

== Production ==
The design was built starting in 1980 by Captiva Yachts of Clearwater, Florida and later by Sovereign Yachts of Port Richey, Florida, both in the United States, but it is now out of production.

== Design ==
The Captiva 35 is a recreational keelboat, built predominantly of fiberglass, with wood trim. It has a masthead sloop with aluminum spars, a raked stem, a reverse transom, a skeg-mounted rudder controlled by a wheel and a fixed fin keel. It displaces 15,100 lb (6,849 kg) and carries 4,300 lb (1,950 kg) of ballast.

The boat has a draft of 5.17 ft (1.58 m) with the standard keel and is fitted with a diesel engine for docking and maneuvering.

The design has sleeping accommodation for seven people in three cabins. There is a bow cabin with a "V"-berth, a U-shaped dinette in the main cabin that forms a double berth, plus a main cabin single settee berth, and aft cabin with a double berth. The galley is located on the starboard side just forward of the companionway ladder. The galley is L-shaped and is equipped with a three-burner stove and a double sink. A navigation station is opposite the galley, on the port side. The head is located just aft of the bow cabin on the port side and includes a shower. The fresh water tank has a capacity of 95 U.S. gallons (360 L; 79 imp gal)

The design has a hull speed of 7.29 kn (13.50 km/h).

== See also ==
- List of sailing boat types
