= Sovereign 17 =

1980s American recreational keelboat

Development
- Designer: Sovereign Design Group
- Location: United States
- Year: 1980
- Builders: Sovereign Yachts; Custom Fiberglass Products
- Role: Day sailer-cruiser
- Name: Sovereign 17

Boat
- Displacement: 1,350 lb (612 kg)
- Draft: 1.83 ft (0.56 m)

Hull
- Type: monohull
- Construction: fiberglass
- LOA: 17.00 ft (5.18 m)
- LWL: 14.50 ft (4.42 m)
- Beam: 7.00 ft (2.13 m)
- Engine: outboard motor

Hull appendages
- Keel: fin keel
- Ballast: 625 lb (283 kg)
- Rudder: transom-mounted rudder

Rig
- Rig type: Bermuda rig
- I foretriangle height: 17.33 ft (5.28 m)
- J foretriangle base: 6.16 ft (1.88 m)
- P mainsail luff: 16.16 ft (4.93 m)
- E mainsail foot: 7.75 ft (2.36 m)

Sails
- Sailplan: fractional rigged sloop
- Mainsail area: 62.62 sq ft (5.818 m^{2})
- Jib/genoa area: 53.38 sq ft (4.959 m^{2})
- Total sail area: 116.00 sq ft (10.777 m^{2})

The Sovereign 17 is an American sailboat that was designed by the Sovereign Design Group as a daysailer and pocket cruiser and first built in 1980. It was sold under a variety of names, including the Sovereign 18, Sovereign 5.0, Sovereign 5M and Adventurer 17.

The Antares 17 is a development of the Sovereign 17, with a new deck design.

== Production ==
The design was built by Sovereign Yachts, a division of Custom Fiberglass Products, in the United States, starting in 1980, but it is now out of production.

== Design ==
The Sovereign 17 is a recreational keelboat, built predominantly of fiberglass, with wood trim. It has a fractional sloop rig; a spooned, raked stem; an angled transom; a transom-hung rudder controlled by a tiller and a fixed shoal draft fin keel. It displaces 1,350 lb (612 kg) and carries 625 lb (283 kg) of ballast.

The boat has a draft of 1.83 ft (0.56 m) with the standard keel and is normally fitted with a small 3 to 6 hp (2 to 4 kW) outboard motor for docking and maneuvering.

The design has sleeping accommodation for three people, with a small double "V"-berth in the bow and a straight quarter berth aft. The galley is located on the starboard side just forward of the companionway ladder. The galley is L-shaped and is equipped with a sink. The head is located just aft of the bow bunk on the port side. Cabin headroom is 48 in (122 cm).

The design has a hull speed of 5.1 kn (9.4 km/h).

== Operational history ==
In a 2010 review Steve Henkel wrote, "Best features: Shallow draft is good for exploring shoal waters. She's trailerable (approximate towing weight is just under 2,000 lbs.), and short enough to fit into a standard sized garage. Self-bailing cockpit is deep and comfortable. Worst features: The Sovereign 5.0's V-berth has less than six feet of usable length because of its narrow foot end—good for small kids but not adults. There's only one quarter berth in most versions, so we suppose that makes her a boat for single moms or dads. Her rig is undersized for winds below about eight knots, so she'll need a small outboard to get her home in most typical harbor conditions. When the wind does pipe up, she will slide off considerably on close reaches and beats to windward due to her very shallow keel and absence of a centerboard. The shorter Capri 16, a comp[etitor], could sail rings around her."

== See also ==
- List of sailing boat types
