= Mud Hen Lake =

Mud Hen Lake or Mud Hen Lakes may refer to:

- Mud Hen Lake, Minnesota, a populated place
- Mud Hen Lake, a lake in Daniels, Wisconsin
- Mud Hen Lakes, lakes in Dakota County, Minnesota

== See also ==
- Mud hen (disambiguation)
