= Tiara Yachts =

American boat manufacturer

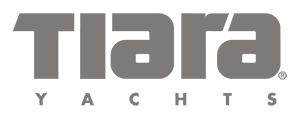

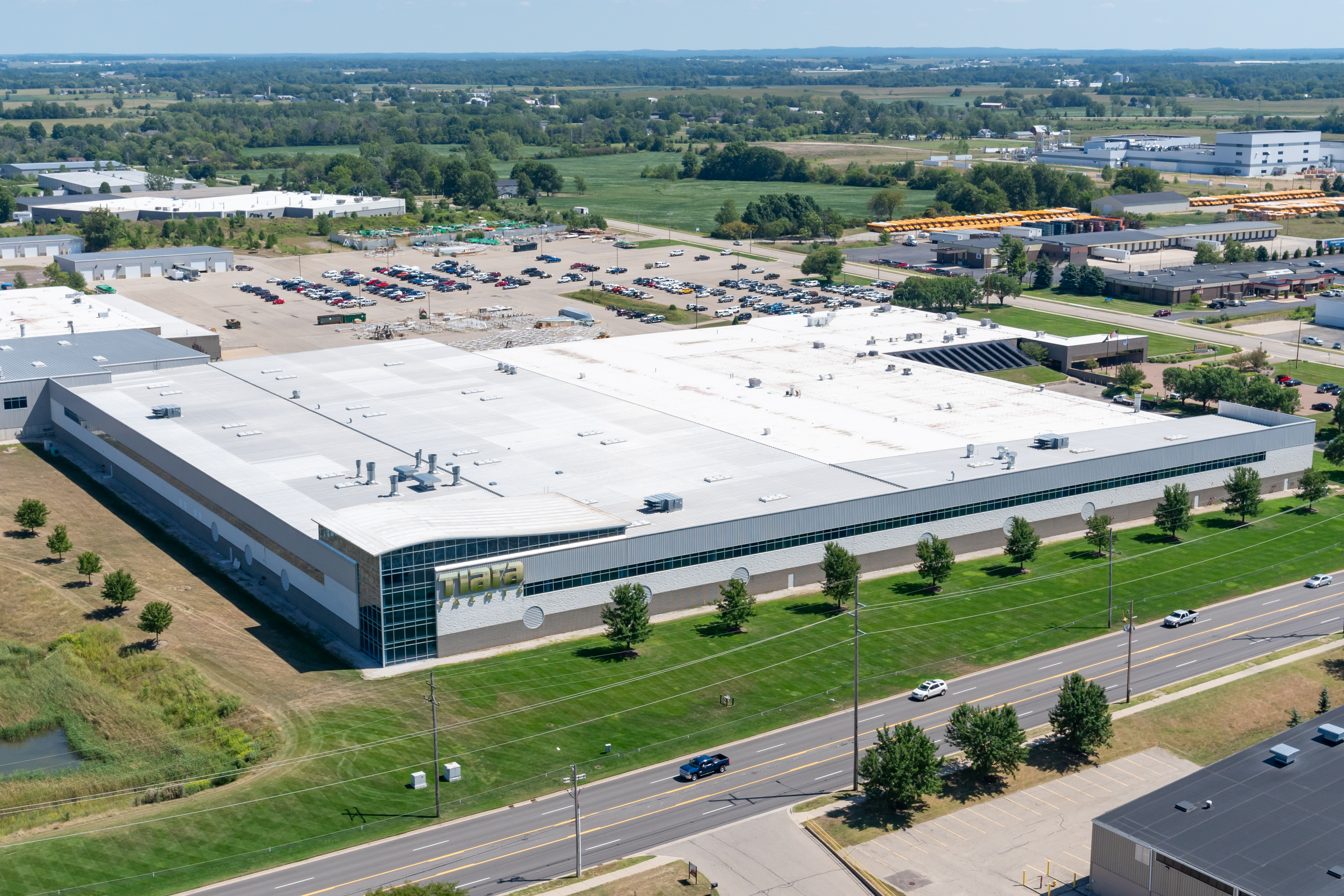
- Tiara Yachts manufacturing headquarters in Holland, Mich.
- Founded: February 18, 1974
- Founder: Leon Slikkers
- Headquarters: Holland, Michigan, United States
- Website: tiarayachts.com

Tiara Yachts is a boat manufacturer headquartered in Holland, Michigan, and is one of the oldest privately held boat manufacturers in the United States. The company, founded in 1974 by Leon Slikkers, manufactures inboard and outboard yachts ranging from 34–60 feet.

== History of Company ==
Tiara Yachts traces its roots back to January 1955, when a 27-year-old Slikkers began building wooden runabouts under the SlickCraft name in a small shop in Holland, Michigan. Slikkers had previously worked for Chris-Craft before venturing out on his own.

Slikkers was an early pioneer of the use of Fiberglass and began experimenting with fiberglass hull construction almost immediately. By 1960, Slickcraft was building fiberglass hulls in-house and had phased out its line of molded Plywood models.

In 1962, production expanded to a 29,000-square-foot former roller rink in Holland and would continue to grow and expand in the subsequent decade.

Slikkers sold SlickCraft to AMF Corporation in 1969 and remained president before venturing out on his own once more. S2 Yachts was founded on February 18, 1974, with an original focus on building sailboats. The Tiara Yachts powerboat division was added soon after, followed by the Pursuit fishing boat line.

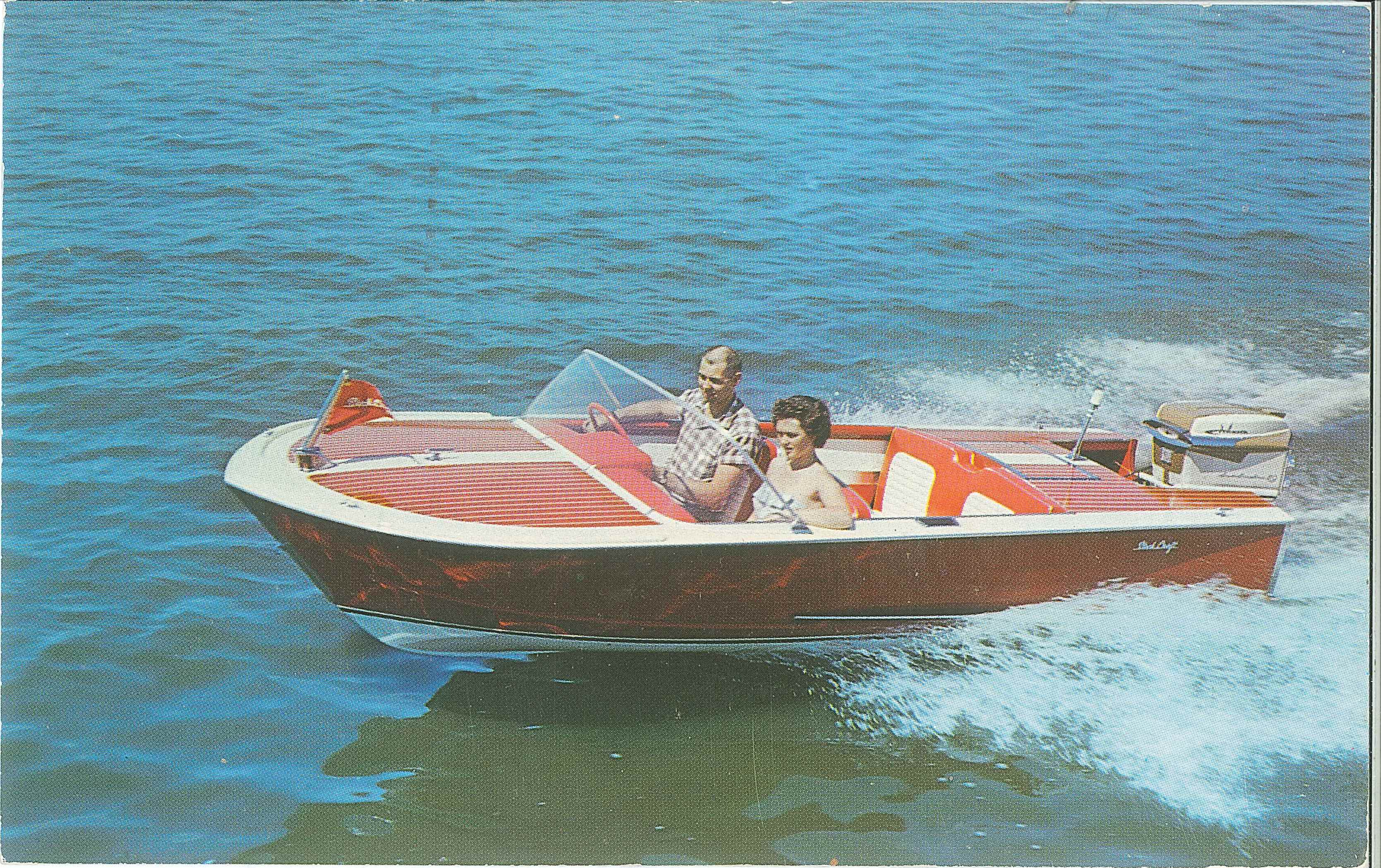
Leon and Delores Slikkers pictured in a SlickCraft wooden runabout in the late 1950s.

At the same time, construction began on a new 72,000-square-foot manufacturing facility at 725 E. 40th Street, where the plant remains to this day. Demand for boats was so high that production began as soon as the walls and roof were raised. One of Slikkers’ sons or another trusted employee would guard the plant each night until windows and doors could be installed.

In 1983, the Slikkers family purchased the SlickCraft name back from AMF and began producing boats under the banner until the late 1980s.

Slikkers’ remained at the helm of the company until 2001, when eldest son David assumed the role of CEO. Sons Robert and Tom were named presidents of Tiara and Pursuit, respectively.

In 2004, innovation and customer satisfaction collided when Tiara partnered with Volvo Penta, making history and becoming one of the first boat builders in the world to use Volvo Penta’s revolutionary new propulsion system, the Volvo Penta IPS on the Tiara Yachts 38 Open. The future of boating lay in the innovative pod propulsion system that offered unparalleled benefits as a unique alternative to the traditional shaft drive.

Tiara Yachts also partners closely with outboard engine manufacturer Mercury Marine. Tiara and Mercury collaborated in 2019 ahead of the launch of the Verado V12 600 HP engine, as Tiara created the first product designed specifically around the new propulsion package.

Tom Slikkers was named CEO in 2012 and ushered in the Coupe line before introducing an outboard-powered lineup, then known as Tiara Sport. The 38 LS (Luxury Sport) debuted in the fall of 2017 as the first outboard-powered Tiara. Its focus on performance without sacrificing luxury quickly set it apart from other vessels in its class; the 38 LS was recognized as the 2018 Miami International Boat Show Innovation Award winner.

In 2022 Tiara Yachts launched the EX 60, the largest and most innovative model in their portfolio to date.

Tiara Yachts remains family owned and employs over 650 employees as of 2025.
