= S2 8.0 B =

1970s US recreational keelboat

Development
- Designer: Arthur Edmunds
- Location: United States
- Year: 1976
- No. built: 426
- Builder: S2 Yachts
- Role: Cruiser
- Name: S2 8.0 B

Boat
- Displacement: 4,600 lb (2,087 kg)
- Draft: 4.00 ft (1.22 m)

Hull
- Type: monohull
- Construction: fiberglass
- LOA: 26.00 ft (7.92 m)
- LWL: 21.42 ft (6.53 m)
- Beam: 8.00 ft (2.44 m)
- Engine: inboard motor

Hull appendages
- Keel: fin keel
- Ballast: 1,800 lb (816 kg)
- Rudder: internally-mounted spade-type rudder

Rig
- Rig type: Bermuda rig
- I foretriangle height: 29.80 ft (9.08 m)
- J foretriangle base: 11.50 ft (3.51 m)
- P mainsail luff: 26.10 ft (7.96 m)
- E mainsail foot: 9.00 ft (2.74 m)

Sails
- Sailplan: masthead sloop
- Mainsail area: 117.45 sq ft (10.911 m^{2})
- Jib/genoa area: 171.35 sq ft (15.919 m^{2})
- Total sail area: 288.80 sq ft (26.830 m^{2})

The S2 8.0 B is an American sailboat that was designed by Arthur Edmunds as a cruiser and first built in 1976. The designation indicates the approximate length overall in meters. The design uses the same hull as the S2 8.0 A and the S2 8.0 C.

== Production ==
The design was built by S2 Yachts in Holland, Michigan, United States, between 1976 and 1983, with 426 boats completed, but it is now out of production.

== Design ==
The S2 8.0 B is a recreational keelboat, built predominantly of fiberglass, with wood trim. It has a masthead sloop rig, a raked stem, a slightly angled transom, an internally mounted spade-type rudder controlled by a tiller and a fixed fin keel, shoal draft keel or keel and centerboard. It displaces 4,600 lb (2,087 kg) and carries 1,800 lb (816 kg) of lead ballast.

A version with a tall rig was also available, with a mast about 1.65 ft (0.50 m) taller.

The fin keel-equipped version of the boat has a draft of 4.00 ft (1.22 m), while the optional shoal draft keel has a draft of 2.50 ft (0.76 m). The centerboard-equipped version has a draft of 6.00 ft (1.83 m) with the centerboard extended and 2.50 ft (0.76 m) with it retracted, allowing operation in shallow water or ground transportation on a trailer.

The boat is fitted with an inboard engine for docking and maneuvering, with a saildrive optional.

The design has sleeping accommodation for four people, with a double "V"-berth in the bow cabin, a straight settee berth on the port side in the main cabin and an aft quarter berth on the port side. The galley is located on the starboard side at the companionway ladder. The galley is L-shaped and is equipped with a two-burner stove, an ice box and a sink. The head is located just aft of the bow cabin on the port side. Cabin headroom is 70 in (178 cm).

The design has a hull speed of 6.2 kn (11.5 km/h).
