= Sovereign 28 =

Sailboat class

Development
- Location: United States
- Year: 1983
- Builder: Sovereign Yachts
- Role: Cruiser
- Name: Sovereign 28

Boat
- Displacement: 6,800 lb (3,084 kg)
- Draft: 3.25 ft (0.99 m)

Hull
- Type: monohull
- Construction: fiberglass
- LOA: 28.00 ft (8.53 m)
- LWL: 23.00 ft (7.01 m)
- Beam: 8.33 ft (2.54 m)
- Engine: BMW diesel engine

Hull appendages
- Keel: fin keel
- Ballast: 2,400 lb (1,089 kg)
- Rudder: internally-mounted spade-type rudder

Rig
- Rig type: Bermuda rig
- I foretriangle height: 33.60 ft (10.24 m)
- J foretriangle base: 12.70 ft (3.87 m)
- P mainsail luff: 27.80 ft (8.47 m)
- E mainsail foot: 11.00 ft (3.35 m)

Sails
- Sailplan: cutter rigged sloop
- Mainsail area: 152.90 sq ft (14.205 m^{2})
- Jib/genoa area: 213.36 sq ft (19.822 m^{2})
- Total sail area: 366.26 sq ft (34.027 m^{2})

The Sovereign 28 is an American sailboat that was designed as a cruiser and first built in 1983.

The design was developed into the Sovereign 30 in 1998.

== Production ==
The design was built by Sovereign Yachts in the United States, starting in 1983, but it is now out of production.

== Design ==
The Sovereign 28 is a recreational keelboat, built predominantly of fiberglass, with wood trim. It has a cutter rig with a bowsprit, a center cockpit, a clipper bow, an angled transom, an internally mounted spade-type rudder controlled by a wheel and a fixed fin keel. It displaces 6,800 lb (3,084 kg) and carries 2,400 lb (1,089 kg) of ballast.

The boat has a draft of 3.25 ft (0.99 m) with the standard keel.

The boat is fitted with a German BMW diesel engine for docking and maneuvering. The fuel tank holds 17 U.S. gallons (64 L; 14 imp gal) and the fresh water tank has a capacity of 19 U.S. gallons (72 L; 16 imp gal).

The design has sleeping accommodation for four people, with a double "V"-berth in the bow cabin and an aft cabin with a double berth. The galley is located on the port side just aft of the bow cabin. The galley is equipped with a two-burner stove, icebox and a sink. The head is located on the starboard side of the companionway and includes a shower.

The design has a hull speed of 6.43 kn (11.91 km/h).

== See also ==
- List of sailing boat types
