= S2 35 =

Sailboat class

Development
- Location: United States
- Year: 1986
- No. built: 35
- Builder: S2 Yachts
- Role: Cruiser
- Name: S2 35

Boat
- Displacement: 14,000 lb (6,350 kg)
- Draft: 4.25 ft (1.30 m)

Hull
- Type: monohull
- Construction: fiberglass
- LOA: 35.17 ft (10.72 m)
- LWL: 28.33 ft (8.63 m)
- Beam: 11.50 ft (3.51 m)
- Engine: Volvo 28 hp (21 kW) diesel engine

Hull appendages
- Keel: fin keel
- Ballast: 6,100 lb (2,767 kg)
- Rudder: internally-mounted spade-type rudder

Rig
- Rig type: Bermuda rig
- I foretriangle height: 45.00 ft (13.72 m)
- J foretriangle base: 14.20 ft (4.33 m)
- P mainsail luff: 38.67 ft (11.79 m)
- E mainsail foot: 14.20 ft (4.33 m)

Sails
- Sailplan: masthead sloop
- Mainsail area: 274.56 sq ft (25.507 m^{2})
- Jib/genoa area: 319.50 sq ft (29.683 m^{2})
- Total sail area: 594.06 sq ft (55.190 m^{2})

The S2 35 is an American sailboat that was designed by Graham & Schlageter as a cruiser. The design is also referred to as the S2 35C for "center cockpit", although there was no other configuration model built. At its introduction in 1986, S2 Yachts marketed the boat as the S2 35 Mid Cockpit.

== Production ==
The design was built by S2 Yachts in Holland, Michigan, United States from 1986 until 1987, with 35 boats completed, but it is now out of production.

== Design ==
The S2 35 is a recreational keelboat, built predominantly of hand-laid AME 4000 resin fiberglass with an end grain balsa core. The trim is teak. It has a masthead sloop rig with double mast spreaders. The hull has a raked stem, a reverse transom with a swimming platform, an internally mounted spade-type rudder controlled by a wheel and a fixed fin keel. It displaces 14,000 lb (6,350 kg) and carries 6,100 lb (2,767 kg) of ballast.

The boat has a draft of 4.25 ft (1.30 m) with the standard keel.

The boat is fitted with a Swedish Volvo diesel engine of 28 hp (21 kW) for docking and maneuvering. The fuel tank holds 32 U.S. gallons (120 L; 27 imp gal) and the fresh water tank has a capacity of 70 U.S. gallons (260 L; 58 imp gal).

The design has sleeping accommodation for six people, with a double "V"-berth in the bow cabin, two straight settee berths in the main cabin around a spit dinette table and an aft cabin with a queen-sized berth on the starboard side. The galley is located on the starboard side just aft of the companionway ladder. The galley is equipped with a two-burner stove, an oven, icebox and a sink. There is also a full navigation station. The head is located just aft of the companionway on the port side and includes a shower with a teak floor grate. An additional external shower is located on the swim platform. It has entrance doors to the aft cabin and the main salon. Cabin headroom is 75 in (191 cm) throughout.

Cabin ventilation is provided by eight opening ports, four deck hatches and four dorade vents.

The design has a hull speed of 7.13 kn (13.20 km/h).

== See also ==
- List of sailing boat types
