= S2 7.3 =

1978 US recreational keelboat

Development
- Designer: Arthur Edmunds
- Location: United States
- Year: 1978
- No. built: 404
- Builder: S2 Yachts
- Role: Racer-Cruiser

Boat
- Displacement: 3,250 lb (1,474 kg)
- Draft: 4.00 ft (1.22 m)

Hull
- Type: monohull
- Construction: fiberglass
- LOA: 23.83 ft (7.26 m)
- LWL: 18.50 ft (5.64 m)
- Beam: 8.00 ft (2.44 m)
- Engine: outboard motor

Hull appendages
- Keel: fin keel
- Ballast: 1,300 lb (590 kg)
- Rudder: internally-mounted spade-type rudder

Rig
- Rig type: Bermuda rig
- I foretriangle height: 29.00 ft (8.84 m)
- J foretriangle base: 10.25 ft (3.12 m)
- P mainsail luff: 25.00 ft (7.62 m)
- E mainsail foot: 8.50 ft (2.59 m)

Sails
- Sailplan: masthead sloop
- Mainsail area: 106.25 sq ft (9.871 m^{2})
- Jib/genoa area: 148.63 sq ft (13.808 m^{2})
- Total sail area: 254.88 sq ft (23.679 m^{2})

Rating
- PHRF: 228

The S2 7.3 is a recreational keelboat. The designation indicates the approximate length overall in meters. The design was built by S2 Yachts in Holland, Michigan, United States from 1978 until 1987, with 404 boats completed, but it is now out of production.

== Design ==
The S2 7.3 is built predominantly of fiberglass, with wood trim. It has a masthead sloop rig, a raked stem, a slightly reverse transom, an internally mounted spade-type rudder controlled by a tiller and a fixed fin keel or optional shoal draft keel that was designed by Graham & Schlageter. It displaces 3,250 lb (1,474 kg) and carries 1,300 lb (590 kg) of lead ballast.

The boat has a draft of 4.00 ft (1.22 m) with the standard keel and 2.83 ft (0.86 m) with the optional shoal draft keel.

The boat is normally fitted with a small 3 to 6 hp (2 to 4 kW) outboard motor for docking and maneuvering.

The design has sleeping accommodation for four people, with a double "V"-berth in the bow cabin and two straight settee berths in the main cabin. The galley is located on the port side abeam the companionway ladder and is equipped with a single sink. The head is located in the bow cabin on the port side, under the "V"-berth. Cabin headroom is 60 in (152 cm) and the fresh water tank has a capacity of 15 U.S. gallons (57 L; 12 imp gal).

The design has a PHRF racing average handicap of 228 and a hull speed of 5.8 kn (10.7 km/h).

== Reception ==
In a 2010 review Steve Henkel wrote, "best features: Good space below for a 24-footer. Worst features: The old-fashioned keel design exposes so much wetted surface that we can't help but assume it slows her down in light air, compared with her comps."
