= S2 6.9 =

1980s US recreational keelboat

Development
- Designer: Don Wennersten, Graham & Schlageter
- Location: United States
- Year: 1983
- No. built: 174
- Builder: S2 Yachts
- Role: Racer-Cruiser
- Name: S2 6.9

Boat
- Displacement: 2,200 lb (998 kg)
- Draft: 4.50 ft (1.37 m) with keel down

Hull
- Type: monohull
- Construction: fiberglass
- LOA: 22.00 ft (6.71 m)
- LWL: 18.75 ft (5.72 m)
- Beam: 8.00 ft (2.44 m)
- Engine: outboard motor

Hull appendages
- Keel: lifting keel
- Ballast: 770 lb (349 kg)
- Rudder: transom-mounted rudder

Rig
- Rig type: Bermuda rig
- I foretriangle height: 26.00 ft (7.92 m)
- J foretriangle base: 7.80 ft (2.38 m)
- P mainsail luff: 25.30 ft (7.71 m)
- E mainsail foot: 10.00 ft (3.05 m)

Sails
- Sailplan: fractional rigged sloop
- Mainsail area: 126.50 sq ft (11.752 m^{2})
- Jib/genoa area: 101.40 sq ft (9.420 m^{2})
- Total sail area: 227.90 sq ft (21.173 m^{2})

Racing
- PHRF: 205

The S2 6.9, also marketed as the S2 6.9 Grand Slam, is an American trailerable sailboat that was designed by Don Wennersten and Graham & Schlageter as racer-cruiser and first built in 1983. The designation indicates the approximate length overall in meters.

The S2 6.9 is a development of the 1980 S2 6.7. It was later developed into the wing keel-equipped S2 22 in 1985.

== Production ==
The design was built by S2 Yachts in Holland, Michigan, United States from 1983 until 1986, with 174 boats completed, but it is now out of production.

== Design ==
The S2 6.9 was derived from the 6.7 and used the same Wennersten-designed hull. S2 Yachts engaged Graham & Schlageter to make changes to the cockpit, cabin, sailplan and the keel, however the result was a boat that was no faster than the 6.7.

The S2 6.9 is a recreational keelboat, built predominantly of fiberglass, with wood trim. It has a fractional sloop rig, a raked stem, a plumb transom, a transom-hung rudder controlled by a tiller and a lifting keel operated via a winch from the cockpit. It displaces 2,200 lb (998 kg) and carries 770 lb (349 kg) of ballast. The ballast is split with 430 lb (195 kg) in the keel and 340 lb (154 kg) in the hull.

The boat has a draft of 4.50 ft (1.37 m) with the lifting keel extended and 10 in (25 cm) with it retracted, allowing operation in shallow water, beaching or ground transportation on a trailer.

The boat is normally fitted with a small 3 to 6 hp (2 to 4 kW) outboard motor for docking and maneuvering.

The design has sleeping accommodation for four people, with a double "V"-berth in the bow cabin and two straight settees in the main cabin. The galley is located on the port side just aft of the bow cabin and is equipped with an ice box. The head is located just aft of the bow cabin on the starboard side, beside the keel trunk. Cabin headroom is 48 in (122 cm).

The design has a PHRF racing average handicap of 205 and a hull speed of 5.8 kn (10.7 km/h).

== Reception ==
In a 2010 review Steve Henkel wrote, "best features: The ten-inch draft and smooth bottom with keel up makes her easy to launch and retrieve to a trailer, Worst features: The lifting keel takes a winch to lift its 430 pounds straight up. (The other 340 pounds of ballast is in the hull.)"
