= G&S 27 =

Sailboat class

Development
- Designer: Graham & Schlageter
- Location: United States
- Year: 1986
- Builder: various
- Role: Racer

Boat
- Displacement: 5,100 lb (2,313 kg)
- Draft: 5.00 ft (1.52 m)

Hull
- Type: monohull
- Construction: fiberglass
- LOA: 27.00 ft (8.23 m)
- LWL: 22.50 ft (6.86 m)
- Beam: 9.00 ft (2.74 m)
- Engine: outboard motor

Hull appendages
- Keel: fin keel
- Ballast: 1,975 lb (896 kg)
- Rudder: transom-mounted rudder

Rig
- Rig type: Bermuda rig
- I foretriangle height: 35.00 ft (10.67 m)
- J foretriangle base: 10.50 ft (3.20 m)
- P mainsail luff: 29.00 ft (8.84 m)
- E mainsail foot: 12.25 ft (3.73 m)

Sails
- Sailplan: fractional rigged sloop masthead sloop
- Mainsail area: 177.63 sq ft (16.502 m^{2})
- Jib/genoa area: 183.75 sq ft (17.071 m^{2})
- Total sail area: 361.38 sq ft (33.573 m^{2})

Racing
- Class association: MORC

The G&S 27 is an American sailboat that was designed by Graham & Schlageter as a Midget Ocean Racing Club (MORC) racer and first built in 1986.

The boat is very similar to the Mariah 27, also designed by Graham & Schlageter in 1986.

== Design ==
The G&S 27 is a racing keelboat, built predominantly of fiberglass. It has a masthead sloop rig, a raked stem, a plumb transom, a transom-hung rudder controlled by a tiller and a fixed fin keel. It displaces 5,100 lb (2,313 kg) and carries 1,975 lb (896 kg) of ballast.

The boat has a draft of 5.00 ft (1.52 m) with the standard keel and is normally fitted with a small outboard motor for docking and maneuvering.

The design has a hull speed of 6.36 kn (11.78 km/h).

== See also ==
- List of sailing boat types
