= S2 8.0 C =

1970s US recreational keelboat

Development
- Designer: Arthur Edmunds
- Location: United States
- Year: 1975
- No. built: 210
- Builder: S2 Yachts
- Role: Cruiser
- Name: S2 8.0 C

Boat
- Displacement: 5,200 lb (2,359 kg)
- Draft: 4.00 ft (1.22 m)

Hull
- Type: monohull
- Construction: fiberglass
- LOA: 26.00 ft (7.92 m)
- LWL: 21.42 ft (6.53 m)
- Beam: 8.00 ft (2.44 m)
- Engine: inboard motor

Hull appendages
- Keel: fin keel
- Ballast: 1,800 lb (816 kg)
- Rudder: internally-mounted spade-type rudder

Rig
- Rig type: Bermuda rig
- I foretriangle height: 30.30 ft (9.24 m)
- J foretriangle base: 11.50 ft (3.51 m)
- P mainsail luff: 26.10 ft (7.96 m)
- E mainsail foot: 9.00 ft (2.74 m)

Sails
- Sailplan: masthead sloop
- Mainsail area: 117.45 sq ft (10.911 m^{2})
- Jib/genoa area: 174.23 sq ft (16.186 m^{2})
- Total sail area: 291.68 sq ft (27.098 m^{2})

The S2 8.0 C is a recreational keelboat built by S2 Yachts in Holland, Michigan, United States, starting in 1975, with 210 boats completed, but it is now out of production.

The S2 8.0 A, S2 8.0 B and the 8.0 C all share the same hull design, with different deck configurations and interior arrangements used. The number designation indicates the approximate length overall in meters and the "C" indicates "center cockpit".

== Design ==
The S2 8.0 C isbuilt predominantly of fiberglass, with wood trim. It has a masthead sloop rig, a raked stem, a slightly angled transom, an internally mounted spade-type rudder controlled by a wheel and a fixed fin keel or shoal draft keel. It has a center cockpit, displaces 5,200 lb (2,359 kg) and carries 1,800 lb (816 kg) of ballast.

The boat has a draft of 4.00 ft (1.22 m) with the standard keel and 2.5 ft (0.76 m) with the optional shoal draft keel. The boat is fitted with an inboard engine for docking and maneuvering.

The design has sleeping accommodation for four people, with a dinette table and benches in the bow that converts into a double "V"-berth and an aft cabin with a double berth. The galley is located on the port side just forward of the companionway ladder. The galley is equipped with a two-burner stove, an ice box and a sink. A navigation station is opposite the galley, under the cockpit. The head is located on the starboard side amidships.

For sailing the design may be equipped with a number of jibs or genoas.

The design has a hull speed of 6.2 kn (11.5 km/h).
