= S2 10.3 =

Sailboat class

Development
- Designer: Graham & Schlageter
- Location: United States
- Year: 1982
- No. built: 45
- Builder: S2 Yachts
- Role: Racer-Cruiser
- Name: S2 10.3

Boat
- Displacement: 10,500 lb (4,763 kg)
- Draft: 6.16 ft (1.88 m)

Hull
- Type: monohull
- Construction: fiberglass
- LOA: 33.75 ft (10.29 m)
- LWL: 28.00 ft (8.53 m)
- Beam: 11.33 ft (3.45 m)
- Engine: Yanmar 2GM diesel engine

Hull appendages
- Keel: fin keel
- Ballast: 4,500 lb (2,041 kg)
- Rudder: internally-mounted spade-type rudder

Rig
- Rig type: Bermuda rig
- I foretriangle height: 45.00 ft (13.72 m)
- J foretriangle base: 13.50 ft (4.11 m)
- P mainsail luff: 40.00 ft (12.19 m)
- E mainsail foot: 13.00 ft (3.96 m)

Sails
- Sailplan: masthead sloop
- Mainsail area: 260.00 sq ft (24.155 m^{2})
- Jib/genoa area: 303.75 sq ft (28.219 m^{2})
- Total sail area: 563.75 sq ft (52.374 m^{2})

The S2 10.3 is an American sailboat that was designed by Graham & Schlageter as a racer-cruiser and first built in 1982. The designation indicates the approximate length overall in meters.

== Production ==
The design was built by S2 Yachts in Holland, Michigan, United States from 1982 to 1987, with 45 boats built.

== Design ==
The S2 10.3 is a recreational keelboat, built predominantly of fiberglass, with wood trim. It has a masthead sloop rig, a raked stem, a reverse transom, an internally mounted spade-type rudder controlled by a tiller and a fixed fin keel or shoal draft keel. It displaces 10,500 lb (4,763 kg) and carries 4,500 lb (2,041 kg) of ballast.

The boat has a draft of 6.16 ft (1.88 m) with the standard keel and 4.92 ft (1.50 m) with the optional shoal draft keel.

The boat is fitted with a Japanese Yanmar 2GM diesel engine for docking and maneuvering.

The design has sleeping accommodation for eight people, with a double "V"-berth in the bow cabin, two straight settee berths in the main cabin and two aft cabins with double berths. The galley is located on the starboard side just forward of the companionway ladder. The galley is L-shaped and is equipped with a two-burner stove and a sink. A navigation station is opposite the galley, on the port side. The head is located just aft of the bow cabin on the port side.

For sailing downwind the design may be equipped with a symmetrical spinnaker.

The design has a hull speed of 7.09 kn (13.13 km/h).

== See also ==
- List of sailing boat types
