= Mud Hen 17 =

Gaff rigged US-built sharpie sailboat

Development
- Designer: Reuben Trane
- Location: United States
- Year: 1981
- Builders: Florida Bay Boat Company; Sovereign Yachts
- Name: Mud Hen 17

Boat
- Displacement: 650 lb (295 kg)
- Draft: 3.50 ft (1.07 m) with centerboard down

Hull
- Type: monohull
- Construction: fiberglass
- LOA: 17.33 ft (5.28 m)
- LWL: 16.23 ft (4.95 m)
- Beam: 6.25 ft (1.91 m)

Hull appendages
- Keel: centerboard
- Rudder: transom-mounted rudder

Rig
- Rig type: gaff rig

Sails
- Sailplan: catboat
- Mainsail area: 155.00 sq ft (14.400 m^{2})
- Total sail area: 155.00 sq ft (14.400 m^{2})

The Mud Hen 17, also called the Mud Hen, is an American sharpie, named for the bird. It was designed by the Reuben Trane and first built in 1981.

== Production ==
The design was built by the Florida Bay Boat Company and by Sovereign Yachts in the United States, from 1981 to 1986, but it is now out of production.

== Design ==
The Mud Hen 17 is a recreational sailboat, built predominantly of fiberglass, with wood trim. It is a gaff rigged catboat rig with a plumb stem, an angled, transom, a transom-hung rudder controlled by a tiller and a retractable centerboard. It displaces 650 lb (295 kg).

The boat is an open dinghy, but may be fitted with a canvas dodger.

The boat has a draft of 3.50 ft (1.07 m) with the centerboard extended and 6 in (15 cm) with it retracted, allowing operation in shallow water, beaching or ground transportation on a trailer.

The design has a hull speed of 5.4 kn (10.0 km/h).

== Operational history ==
The boat is supported by an active class club, PeepHens.org.
