= Sovereign 20 =

1980s American recreational keelboat

Development
- Designer: Sovereign Design Group; Johannes "Jopie" Helsen
- Location: United States
- Year: 1982
- Builder: Sovereign Yachts
- Role: Day sailer-cruiser
- Name: Sovereign 20

Boat
- Displacement: 1,700 lb (771 kg)
- Draft: 2.00 ft (0.61 m)

Hull
- Type: monohull
- Construction: fiberglass
- LOA: 20.00 ft (6.10 m)
- LWL: 17.00 ft (5.18 m)
- Beam: 7.17 ft (2.19 m)
- Engine: outboard motor

Hull appendages
- Keel: shoal draft fin keel
- Ballast: 600 lb (272 kg)
- Rudder: transom-mounted rudder

Rig
- Rig type: Bermuda rig

Sails
- Sailplan: masthead sloop
- Total sail area: 189.00 sq ft (17.559 m^{2})

The Sovereign 20 is an American sailboat that was designed by the Sovereign Design Group as an daysailer and cruiser and first built in 1982.

The Sovereign 20 is a development of the Montego 20, designed by Johannes "Jopie" Helsen.

== Production ==
The design was built by Sovereign Yachts in the United States, between 1982 and 1997, but it is now out of production. An improved Mark II version was also produced.

== Design ==
The Sovereign 20 is a recreational keelboat, built predominantly of fiberglass, with wood trim. It has a masthead sloop rig; a spooned, raked stem; a plumb transom; a transom-hung rudder controlled by a tiller and a fixed fin, shoal draft keel. It displaces 1,700 lb (771 kg) and carries 600 lb (272 kg) of ballast.

The boat has a draft of 2.00 ft (0.61 m) with the standard shoal draft keel.

The boat is normally fitted with a small 3 to 6 hp (2 to 4 kW) outboard motor for docking and maneuvering.

The design has sleeping accommodation for four people, with a double "V"-berth in the bow cabin and two straight settee berths in the main cabin. The galley is located on both sides just aft of the bow cabin. Cabin headroom is 50 in (127 cm).

The design has a hull speed of 5.5 kn (10.2 km/h).

== Operational history ==
In a 2010 review Steve Henkel wrote, "we have never liked the Sovereign series of boats. We think that as new boats they were grossly overpriced (particularly near the end of their production runs); they were poor sailers relative to their comp[etitor]s; and their marketers made wild claims. Example from a brochure on the Sovereign 20 Mk II in 1997, when the company was about to close: 'The 20 Mk II is ... probably the best mini-cruiser available today.' A quick look at the specs ... shows that except for her two-foot fixed keel, which effectively ruins whatever upwind sailing performance she might otherwise have had, she is very similar in size and weight to her comp[etitor]s—all of which sail better than she does, are easier to handle at a launching ramp, and cost a lot less to buy when new. Best features: When new, the Sovereign topsides finish was usually above average in smoothness and gloss. Worst features: Her 1997 price was a whopping $24,995 FOB Port Richey, FL. A fair price for that year's market? We'd say $11,000 new, sailaway. Her Space Index is lowest in her group. And her rudder hangs below the protection of her shallow keel."
