= S2 6.8 =

1978 US recreational keelboat

Development
- Designer: Don Wennersten and Arthur Edmunds
- Location: United States
- Year: 1976
- No. built: 150
- Builder: S2 Yachts
- Role: Racer-Cruiser
- Name: S2 6.8

Boat
- Displacement: 2,900 lb (1,315 kg)
- Draft: 4.5 ft (1.4 m) with centerboard down

Hull
- Type: monohull
- Construction: fiberglass
- LOA: 22.33 ft (6.81 m)
- LWL: 18.25 ft (5.56 m)
- Beam: 8.00 ft (2.44 m)
- Engine: outboard motor

Hull appendages
- Keel: shoal draft keel with optional centerboard
- Ballast: 1,100 lb (499 kg)
- Rudder: transom-mounted rudder

Rig
- Rig type: Bermuda rig
- I foretriangle height: 26.70 ft (8.14 m)
- J foretriangle base: 9.10 ft (2.77 m)
- P mainsail luff: 23.80 ft (7.25 m)
- E mainsail foot: 8.00 ft (2.44 m)

Sails
- Sailplan: masthead sloop
- Mainsail area: 95.20 sq ft (8.844 m^{2})
- Jib/genoa area: 121.49 sq ft (11.287 m^{2})
- Total sail area: 216.69 sq ft (20.131 m^{2})

Racing
- PHRF: 240

The S2 6.8 is a recreational keelboat. The designation indicates the approximate length overall in meters. With an optional red and orange hull and sail stripe trim package, the boat was sold as the S2 6.8 Exciter. It was built by S2 Yachts in Holland, Michigan, United States from 1978 until 1978, with 150 boats completed.

Designed by Don Wennersten and Arthur Edmunds, the S2 6.8 is a recreational keelboat, built predominantly of fiberglass, with wood trim. It has a masthead sloop rig, a raked stem, an angled transom, a transom-hung rudder controlled by a tiller and a fixed shoal draft keel with an optional cast iron centerboard. It displaces 2,900 lb (1,315 kg) and carries 1,100 lb (499 kg) of lead ballast.

The keel-only-equipped version of the boat has a draft of 2.00 ft (0.61 m), while the centerboard-equipped version has a draft of 4.50 ft (1.37 m) with the centerboard extended and 2.00 ft (0.61 m) with it retracted, allowing operation in shallow water, beaching or ground transportation on a trailer.

The boat is normally fitted with a small 3 to 6 hp (2 to 4 kW) outboard motor for docking and maneuvering.

The design has sleeping accommodation for four people, with a double "V"-berth in the bow cabin and two straight settee berths in the main cabin. The galley is located on the port side at the companionway ladder. The galley is equipped with a sink. The head is located under the "V"-berth in the bow cabin on the port side. Cabin headroom is 51 in (130 cm).

The design has a PHRF racing average handicap of 240 and a hull speed of 5.7 kn (10.6 km/h).

== Reception ==
In a 2010 review Steve Henkel wrote, "Here is a 1970s-style flush-deck offering from S2 ... The S2 6.8 was offered with either a keel-centerboard arrangement ... or as a plain shoal-draft keel (same hull without the centerboard). Best features: the big, flat forward deck is ideal for sunbathing, assuming cure not short-tacking upwind with a 150% decksweeper jib. Her cockpit looks big and comfortable, with high coamings for good back support. Worst features: To our eyes she's not a pretty boat; we think the flush deck and lack of springy sheer give her a tubby look, With the lowest SA/D ratio, the highest D/L ratio, and the highest Motion Index among her comp[etitor]s, she is apt to be slower (note the relatively high PHRF rating) though more stable and comfortable in a seaway. With only one small forward hatch and no opening ports for ventilation, she wouldn't be a good choice for extended cruising in hot climates."
