= G&S 30 =

Sailboat class

Development
- Designer: Graham & Schlageter
- Location: United States
- Year: 1979
- Builder: Various custom builders
- Role: Racer

Boat
- Displacement: 5,650 lb (2,563 kg)
- Draft: 5.30 ft (1.62 m)

Hull
- Type: monohull
- Construction: fiberglass
- LOA: 30.00 ft (9.14 m)
- LWL: 23.00 ft (7.01 m)
- Beam: 9.57 ft (2.92 m)
- Engine: BMW diesel engine/outboard motor

Hull appendages
- Keel: fin keel
- Rudder: internally-mounted spade-type rudder

Rig
- Rig type: Bermuda rig
- I foretriangle height: 32.90 ft (10.03 m)
- J foretriangle base: 9.30 ft (2.83 m)
- P mainsail luff: 37.75 ft (11.51 m)
- E mainsail foot: 14.00 ft (4.27 m)

Sails
- Sailplan: fractional rigged sloop
- Mainsail area: 264.25 sq ft (24.550 m^{2})
- Jib/genoa area: 152.99 sq ft (14.213 m^{2})
- Total sail area: 417.24 sq ft (38.763 m^{2})

Racing
- PHRF: 144

The G&S 30 is an American sailboat that was designed by Graham & Schlageter as an International Offshore Rule Half Ton class racer and first built in 1979.

== Production ==
The design was built by a number of builders on a custom basis, including at least three built by Shea Marine.

== Design ==
The G&S 30 is a recreational keelboat, built predominantly of fiberglass and wood. It has a fractional sloop rig, a raked stem, a sharply reverse transom, an internally mounted spade-type/transom-hung rudder controlled by a tiller and a fixed fin keel. It displaces 5,650 lb (2,563 kg) and has lead ballast.

The boat has a draft of 5.30 ft (1.62 m) with the standard keel.

The boat may be fitted with an inboard engine or a small outboard motor for docking and maneuvering.

The design has a hull speed of 6.43 kn (11.91 km/h) and PHRF racing average handicap of 144.

== Operational history ==
The boat is supported by an active class club that organizes racing events, the Half Ton Class.

== See also ==
- List of sailing boat types
