= S2 9.2 =

Sailboat class

S2 9.2 C
Development
- Designer: Arthur Edmunds
- Location: United States
- Year: 1977
- No. built: 946
- Builder: S2 Yachts
- Role: Cruiser

Boat
- Displacement: 9,800 lb (4,445 kg)
- Draft: 4.92 ft (1.50 m)

Hull
- Type: Monohull
- Construction: Fiberglass
- LOA: 29.92 ft (9.12 m)
- LWL: 25.00 ft (7.62 m)
- Beam: 10.25 ft (3.12 m)
- Engine: Yanmar 2GM diesel engine 15 hp (11 kW)

Hull appendages
- Keel: fin keel
- Ballast: 4,000 lb (1,814 kg)
- Rudder: skeg-mounted rudder

Rig
- Rig type: Bermuda rig
- I foretriangle height: 40.00 ft (12.19 m)
- J foretriangle base: 13.00 ft (3.96 m)
- P mainsail luff: 34.00 ft (10.36 m)
- E mainsail foot: 12.25 ft (3.73 m)

Sails
- Sailplan: Masthead sloop
- Mainsail area: 208.25 sq ft (19.347 m^{2})
- Jib/genoa area: 260.00 sq ft (24.155 m^{2})
- Total sail area: 468.25 sq ft (43.502 m^{2})

Rating
- PHRF: 187 (average)

The S2 9.2 is an American sailboat that was designed by Arthur Edmunds as a cruiser and first built in 1977.

== Production ==
The design was built by S2 Yachts in Holland, Michigan, United States, from 1977 to 1987, but it is now out of production. A total of 946 of all models were completed, including 520 "A" models and 426 "C" models. The "A" models reference the location of the cockpit "aft" and the "C" models reference a center cockpit.

== Design ==
The S2 9.2 is a recreational keelboat, built with a hand-laid laminate hull, with balsa-cored fiberglass deck, inward-turning hull-deck joint protected by aluminum toerail, with teak wood trim. It has a masthead sloop rig, a raked stem, a slightly reverse transom, a skeg-protected rudder controlled by a wheel and a fixed fin keel. All models have a length overall of 29.92 ft (9.12 m), a waterline length of 25.00 ft (7.62 m), displace 9,800 lb (4,445 kg) and carries 4,000 lb (1,814 kg) of lead ballast.

The boat is typically fitted with a Japanese 13 hp (10 kW) Yanmar 2GM diesel engine for docking and maneuvering. The fuel tank holds 30 U.S. gallons (110 L; 25 imp gal) and the fresh water tank has a capacity of 37 U.S. gallons (140 L; 31 imp gal).

In the center-cockpit version, the galley is located amidships on the port side, and features a two-burner alcohol-fueled stove as well as pressurized water. The head is on the starboard side and has a shower and a small tub, along with a pressurized water supply. The master cabin is aft on the center cockpit version, with a forward "V"-berth in the bow, as well as a dinette settee that can be used as a berth. There is also a small settee that is sized for children to sleep on. Ventilation is provided by an aft hatch and a forward hatch above the "V"-berth, as the large cabin portlights are fixed. Engine access is under the chart table.

The aft-cockpit version rearranges these elements, with the galley placed starboard aft; the head (without tub) and dinette settee are to port. Also to port is a nav table and quarterberth. Engine access is under the companionway.

The boat is equipped with two sheeting winches and two winches for the internally-mounted halyards. The 4:1 outhaul and the reefing system are also internally-mounted. There is a 2:1 Cunningham, a fixed topping lift and a 4:1 mainsheet mounted at the rear of the center cockpit on the roof of the aft cabin. The jib sheets are run from the full-length toe rail. An anchor locker is located in the bow.

The design has a PHRF racing average handicap of 187.

== Variants ==
S2 9.2 A

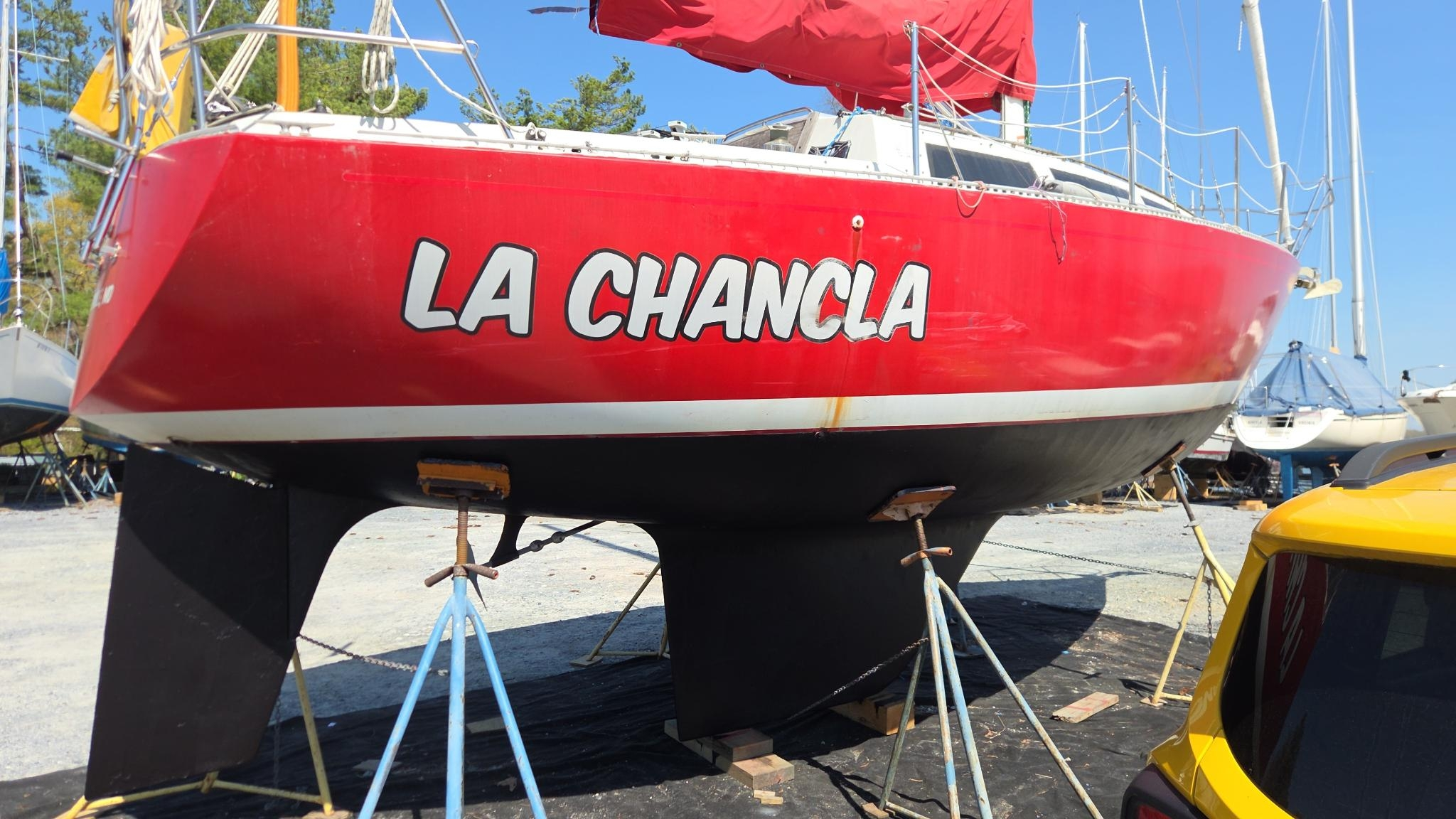
A S2 9.2 A showing keel and skeg-mounted rudder

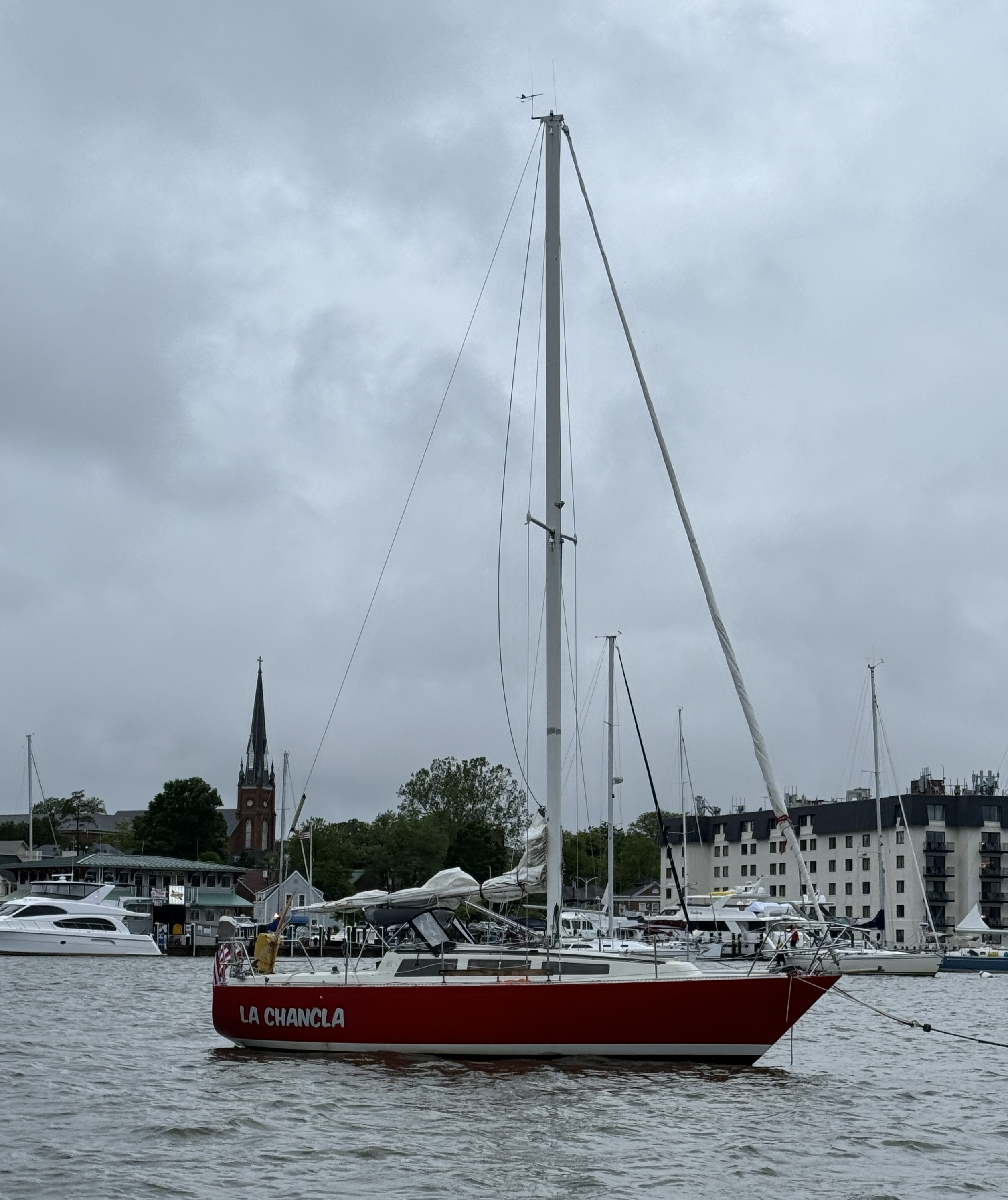
A S2 9.2 A at anchor

Aft cockpit model with a draft of 4.92 ft (1.50 m).
S2 9.2 A SD
Aft cockpit model with a shoal draft of 3.92 ft (1.19 m).
S2 9.2 C
Center cockpit model with a draft of 4.92 ft (1.50 m).
S2 9.2 C SD
Center cockpit model with a shoal draft of 3.90 ft (1.19 m).

== Operational history ==
In a 1992 review Richard Sherwood noted, "the raised deck indicates that this S2 is intended primarily for cruising. For a boat of this size, there is a lot of space below. The ballast/displacement ratio of 41 percent indicates that she will be stiff and, with her center cockpit, dry."

In a 1997 used boat review in The SpinSheet, Jack Hornor noted. "the 9.2 model ranks as a very successful design by any boat builder’s standard and the most successful of the cruising designs built by S2." On its sailing characteristics, Horner wrote: "The sailing performance of the 9.2 is acceptable although not spectacular. With a relatively low aspect keel and skeg forward of the rudder, wetted surface is greater than the comparably sized Catalina or Pearson 30s. Typically the PHRF rating of the standard keel version of the 9.2 is about six seconds slower per mile than the Pearson 30, and about 15 seconds slower than the tall rig Catalina 30. The worst performance can be expected from the center cockpit model with shoal draft. This model tends to make considerable leeway when sailing to weather."

In a 2012 review in Cruising World, writer Richard Smith, stated of the design's sailing qualities, "Sailing the S2 9.2 is a treat. In 15 to 17 knots, it heels sharply under the mainsail and 150-percent genoa before settling in to make 5 or 6 knots upwind. Weather helm is noticeable in stronger gusts, but the boat is generally well balanced and always manageable, even in lumpy seas. All in all, the S2 9.2 is a well-designed, tough, and able 30-footer with good performance for racing or cruising." In describing the design highlights he wrote, "the S2 9.2 stands out, mainly because it wears its age very well. Without a scoop transom and boarding steps or skinny portlights below the sheer, it still looks modern. The flat sheer, sloping deckhouse, almost-flush Lexan forward hatch, hinged anchor lid, and tinted deadlights are familiar features on boats built three decades later."

A Practical Sailor review described the boat, saying "...‘adequate’ would be a good way to describe the sailing performance of the 9.2. The boat came with a deck-stepped Kenyon spar and North sails as standard, later with Hall or Offshore spars. The rigging and other sailing hardware was good enough in quality that little re-rigging or upgrading is likely to be needed ... The boat sails reasonably well. The one we were on, however, would not go to weather decently—a combination of the shoal draft and a well-worn suit of sails. On other points, the boat was respectable. Close and broad reaching, it moved very well and was just a bit sluggish running."

== See also ==
- List of sailing boat types
