= S2 8.5 =

1980s US keelboat

Development
- Designer: Arthur Edmunds
- Location: United States
- Year: 1980
- No. built: 103
- Builder: S2 Yachts
- Role: Cruiser

Boat
- Displacement: 7,600 lb (3,447 kg)
- Draft: 4.50 ft (1.37 m)

Hull
- Type: monohull
- Construction: fiberglass
- LOA: 28.00 ft (8.53 m)
- LWL: 22.50 ft (6.86 m)
- Beam: 9.50 ft (2.90 m)
- Engine: Yanmar 1GM 8 hp (6 kW) diesel engine

Hull appendages
- Keel: fin keel
- Ballast: 3,000 lb (1,361 kg)
- Rudder: internally-mounted spade-type rudder

Rig
- Rig type: Bermuda rig
- I foretriangle height: 37.00 ft (11.28 m)
- J foretriangle base: 11.00 ft (3.35 m)
- P mainsail luff: 31.00 ft (9.45 m)
- E mainsail foot: 12.00 ft (3.66 m)

Sails
- Sailplan: masthead sloop
- Mainsail area: 186.00 sq ft (17.280 m^{2})
- Jib/genoa area: 203.50 sq ft (18.906 m^{2})
- Total sail area: 389.50 sq ft (36.186 m^{2})

The S2 8.5 is a recreational keelboat built by S2 Yachts in Holland, Michigan, United States, starting in 1980, with 103 boats completed.

== Design ==
The S2 8.5 is built predominantly of fiberglass, with wood trim. It has a masthead sloop rig, a raked stem, a reverse transom, an internally mounted spade-type rudder controlled by a wheel, with an emergency back-up tiller and a fixed fin keel or optional shoal draft keel. It displaces 7,600 lb (3,447 kg) and carries 3,000 lb (1,361 kg) of lead ballast.

The boat has a draft of 4.50 ft (1.37 m) with the standard keel and 3.92 ft (1.19 m) with the optional shoal draft keel.

The boat is fitted with a Japanese Yanmar 1GM diesel engine of 8 hp (6 kW) for docking and maneuvering. A few early production boats had BMW diesel inboards. The fuel tank holds 18 U.S. gallons (68 L; 15 imp gal) and the fresh water tank has a capacity of 37 U.S. gallons (140 L; 31 imp gal).

The design has sleeping accommodation for four people, with a double "V"-berth in the bow cabin along with a folding table that seats four, plus two straight settee berths in the main cabin. The galley is located to the port side at the companionway and is equipped with a two-burner stove, an icebox and a sink. The fully-enclosed head is located just aft of the bow cabin and includes a shower. Cabin headroom is 72 in (183 cm).

The design has a hull speed of 6.36 kn (11.78 km/h).

== Reception ==
In a 2000 review in Practical Sailor, Darrell Nicholson wrote, "the S2 8.5 is a good boat for cruising the Great Lakes or any coast in comfort and a certain amount of style. Her appearance may be a little modern for traditionalists, with her straight sheer and European-style cabin windows. Pricey? Yes, but when you look at the things that go into the boat—the rig, good sails, and a comfortable, well finished interior—the price may seem a bit less painful. You still pay for what you get."
