= Captiva 240 =

Sailboat class

Development
- Designer: O.H. Rodgers and Walter Scott
- Location: United States
- Year: 1984
- No. built: 140
- Builder: Captiva Yachts
- Role: Racer-Cruiser

Boat
- Displacement: 2,400 lb (1,089 kg)
- Draft: 4.67 ft (1.42 m) with centerboard down

Hull
- Type: monohull
- Construction: fiberglass
- LOA: 24.00 ft (7.32 m)
- LWL: 20.00 ft (6.10 m)
- Beam: 8.16 ft (2.49 m)
- Engine: outboard motor

Hull appendages
- Keel: fin keel
- Ballast: 1,000 lb (454 kg)
- Rudder: transom-mounted rudder

Rig
- Rig type: Bermuda rig
- I foretriangle height: 31.00 ft (9.45 m)
- J foretriangle base: 8.50 ft (2.59 m)
- P mainsail luff: 27.00 ft (8.23 m)
- E mainsail foot: 11.00 ft (3.35 m)

Sails
- Sailplan: fractional rigged sloop
- Mainsail area: 148.50 sq ft (13.796 m^{2})
- Jib/genoa area: 131.75 sq ft (12.240 m^{2})
- Total sail area: 280.25 sq ft (26.036 m^{2})

Racing
- PHRF: 213

The Captiva 240 is an American trailerable sailboat that was first built in 1984. The boat is a development of the O.H. Rodgers-designed Rodgers 24 racer, modified for use as a racer-cruiser by Walter Scott by giving it a new keel and sailing rig.

== Production ==
The design was built by Captiva Yachts of Clearwater, Florida, United States, from 1984 to 1988, with 140 boats completed, but it is now out of production. The hulls, decks and hull liners were fabricated under contract by Custom Fiberglass Products of Port Richey, Florida.

== Design ==
The Captiva 240 is a recreational keelboat, built predominantly of fiberglass, with wooden trim. It has a fractional sloop rig with a deck-stepped mast, a raked stem, a slightly reverse transom a transom-hung rudder controlled by a tiller and a fixed stub keel, with a centerboard. It displaces 2,400 lb (1,089 kg) and carries 1,000 lb (454 kg) of ballast.

The boat has a draft of 4.67 ft (1.42 m) with the centerboard extended and 2.00 ft (0.61 m) with it retracted, ground transportation on a trailer.

The boat is normally fitted with a small 3 to 6 hp (2 to 4 kW) outboard motor for docking and maneuvering.

The design has sleeping accommodation for five people, with a double "V"-berth in the bow cabin, a straight settee in the main cabin on the starboard side and a drop down table dinette, that can be converted to a double berth on the port side. The sliding, pull-out galley is located on the starboard side just forward of the companionway ladder. The galley is equipped with a stove and a sink. The head is a portable type and is located under the bow cabin "V"-berth on the port side. Cabin headroom is 67 in (170 cm).

The design is equipped with an anchor locker in the bow.

The design has a PHRF racing average handicap of 213 and a hull speed of 6.1 kn (11.3 km/h).

== Operational history ==
In a 2010 review Steve Henkel wrote, "O.H. Rodgers originally designed this craft as an all-out racing machine called the Rodgers 24, and Walt Scott modified it with a slightly different keel and rig for duty as a performance cruiser for Captiva Yachts ... (which unfortunately closed its doors shortly after the vessel was introduced to the market). She's relatively light in weight, especially considering she is equipped with pull-out galley, dining table, head, and sleeping accommodations for five below, and anchor locker, bow and stern pulpits and lifelines on deck ... The average PHRF rating of 213 may keep her from winning as many races as she otherwise might. Or maybe it won't. If you find a well-kept example, check her racing record."

== See also ==
- List of sailing boat types
