= Graham & Schlageter =

Boat design firm

- Company type: Partnership
- Industry: Boat building
- Founded: 1975
- Founders: Scott Graham and Eric Schlageter
- Defunct: 1989
- Headquarters: Chicago, Illinois, United States
- Products: Sailboat designs

Graham & Schlageter (also known as G&S) was an American naval architecture design firm based in Chicago, Illinois. The company specialized in the design of fiberglass sailboats.

The company was founded by Scott Graham and Eric Schlageter in 1975.

== History ==
The first boat designed by G&S was an International Offshore Rule (IOR) Three-Quarter Ton class racing boat called Chocolate Chips. The design was quite successful and won the 1978 North American Three-Quarter Ton class championships, before going on to place third in the world championships. The success of this boat quickly brought additional commissions for racing designs to the firm.

G&S's successful one-off racing designs attracted the attention of S2 Yachts, a company that primarily produced cruising sailboats between 1974 and 1989. S2 Yachts became interested in offering racing boats, and engaged G&S to design the S2 7.9, which would go on to become a successful one design class and Midget Ocean Racing Club (MORC) racer. The boat was produced in fixed keel (1979) and swing keel models (1981) and remained in production until 1986, with 545 boats built.

In 1983, S2 had G&S take the hull for their existing S2 6.7 and make changes to the cockpit, cabin, the sailplan and the keel. The resulting S2 6.9 was no faster than the original, however. Reviewer Steve Henkel wrote in The Sailor's Book of Small Cruising Sailboats:

It is interesting to note what happens when a builder calls in an outside racing design team (in this case the designers Graham & Schlageter) to tweak the performance of an existing boat (the S2 6.7) drawn by an inside designer (in this case Don Wennersten). That's what happened when S2 apparently decided that the 6.7 wasn't fast enough on the race course, and redesigned her, naming her the S2 6.9. You can see what difference it made in the comparison of comp[etitive] stats ... virtually no difference at all ... It makes us wonder if calling in G&S was necessary.

S2 Yachts had the firm design more boats for production including the S2 9.1, S2 10.3, S2 22 and the S2 35.

The firm also continued to design custom IOR and MORC racing boats and became part of the design team for the Chicago Yacht Club's 12 Metre class entry in the America's Cup race, Heart of America.

The partnership was dissolved in 1989, when S2 Yachts stopped sailboat production and the partners moved onto independent projects. Graham became the offshore technical director for the United States Yacht Racing Union, while Schlageter went to work for SAIC, a company involved in America's Cup boat design as well as some military projects.

Schlageter died in 2009, Graham in 2016.

== Boats ==
Summary of boats designed by Graham & Schlageter:

- G&S 30 - 1979
- S2 7.9 FK - 1979
- S2 7.9 - 1981
- S2 6.9 - 1983
- S2 9.1 - 1983
- S2 10.3 - 1983
- S2 22 - 1985
- S2 27 - 1985
- G&S 27 - 1986
- S2 35 - 1986
- Mariah 27 - 1986
- Thomas 35 - 1988

== See also ==
- List of sailboat designers and manufacturers
