= Peep Hen 14 =

Gaff rigged US-built catboat

Development
- Designer: Reuben Trane
- Location: United States
- Year: 1981
- Builders: Nimble Boats Works; Sovereign Yachts; Florida Bay Boat Company
- Role: Cruiser

Boat
- Displacement: 650 lb (295 kg)
- Draft: 3.00 ft (0.91 m) with centerboard down

Hull
- Type: monohull
- Construction: fiberglass
- LOA: 14.17 ft (4.32 m)
- LWL: 13.25 ft (4.04 m)
- Beam: 6.33 ft (1.93 m)
- Engine: outboard motor

Hull appendages
- Keel: centerboard
- Ballast: 200 lb (91 kg)
- Rudder: transom-mounted rudder

Rig
- Rig type: Gaff rig

Sails
- Sailplan: Catboat
- Mainsail area: 115 sq ft (10.7 m^{2})
- Total sail area: 115 sq ft (10.7 m^{2})

The Peep Hen 14 is a gaff rigged catboat. It was built by Nimble Boats Works, Sovereign Yachts and the Florida Bay Boat Company between 1981 and 2003 in the United States.

== Design ==
The Peep Hen 14 is built predominantly of fiberglass, with wood trim. The hull has a plumb stem, a vertical transom, a transom-hung rudder controlled by a tiller and a retractable centerboard. It displaces 650 lb (295 kg) and carries 200 lb (91 kg) of ballast.

The boat has a draft of 3.00 ft (0.91 m) with the centerboard extended and 0.75 ft (0.23 m) with it retracted, allowing operation in shallow water, beaching or ground transportation on a trailer.

The boat is normally fitted with a small 3 to 6 hp (2 to 4 kW) outboard motor for docking and maneuvering.

The design has sleeping accommodation for two people in port and starboard berths that extend under the cockpit seats. The optional portable-type head is located in the cockpit when sleeping. Cabin headroom is 39 in (99 cm).

The design has a hull speed of 4.9 kn (9.1 km/h).

== Reception ==
In a 2010 review Steve Henkel wrote, "designer Trane says he conceived this boat 'after a good New Year's Eve party' as a small, beachable, easy-to-use microcruiser. The 'Peep' has the smallest LOD in this book, though she's far from smallest in usable space, In fact, her big freeboard and beam give her second-best space versus the comp[etitor]s ... Best features: Very shallow draft with centerboard up is good for exploring shoal waters. She's easily trailerable (approximate towing weight 1,100 pounds), and short enough to fit into a standard sized garage. Self-bailing cockpit is deep and comfortable. She has a relatively spacious interior for her size—though 14 feet is about the absolute minimum for living aboard, even for a weekend and in protected waters. Boom gallows is a handy feature, as is an optional bimini and cockpit enclosure that zips to the bimini, Worst features: Price new was high, headroom low compared to comps. Tanbark sails and a high, boxy hull with a wide sheer stripe may make her look cute, but few would call her graceful."
