= Arthur Edmunds =

American naval architect

Arthur Edmunds (May 18, 1933 – July 21, 2005) was an American naval architect, credited with designing 29 sailboats as well as other boats of various types and forms. He is recognized as a top naval architect in the US. Edmunds's best known production sailboat was the Allied Princess 36.

== Early life ==
Arthur H. Edmunds Jr. was born in Philadelphia, Pennsylvania on May 18, 1933. He attended the US Coast Guard Academy in New London, Connecticut. He served in the United States Coast Guard and became a lieutenant in September 1962. He became a marine architect and a member of the Society of Naval Architects and Marine Engineers.

== Career ==
After completing his military service, Edmunds worked at a shipyard before joining Chris Craft as a sailing yacht designer before starting his own design firm in 1968 in Ft. Lauderdale, Florida. Edmunds' design firm operated for 30 years. Leon Slikkers, founder of Slikcraft, and later S2 Yachts, hired Edmunds, who became "S2's in-house designer." Edmunds designed S2's sailboats until 1980, and also provided engineering and design contributions to yachts designed by the firm Graham & Schlageter.

Edmunds is the author of several books including Buying a Great Boat and Designing Power & Sail, published March 1, 1998, by Bristol Fashion Publications, Inc. ISBN 1892216051, 978-1892216052.

Edmunds was known to "prowl boat repair yards" as a learning experience and to aid him in designing better boats.

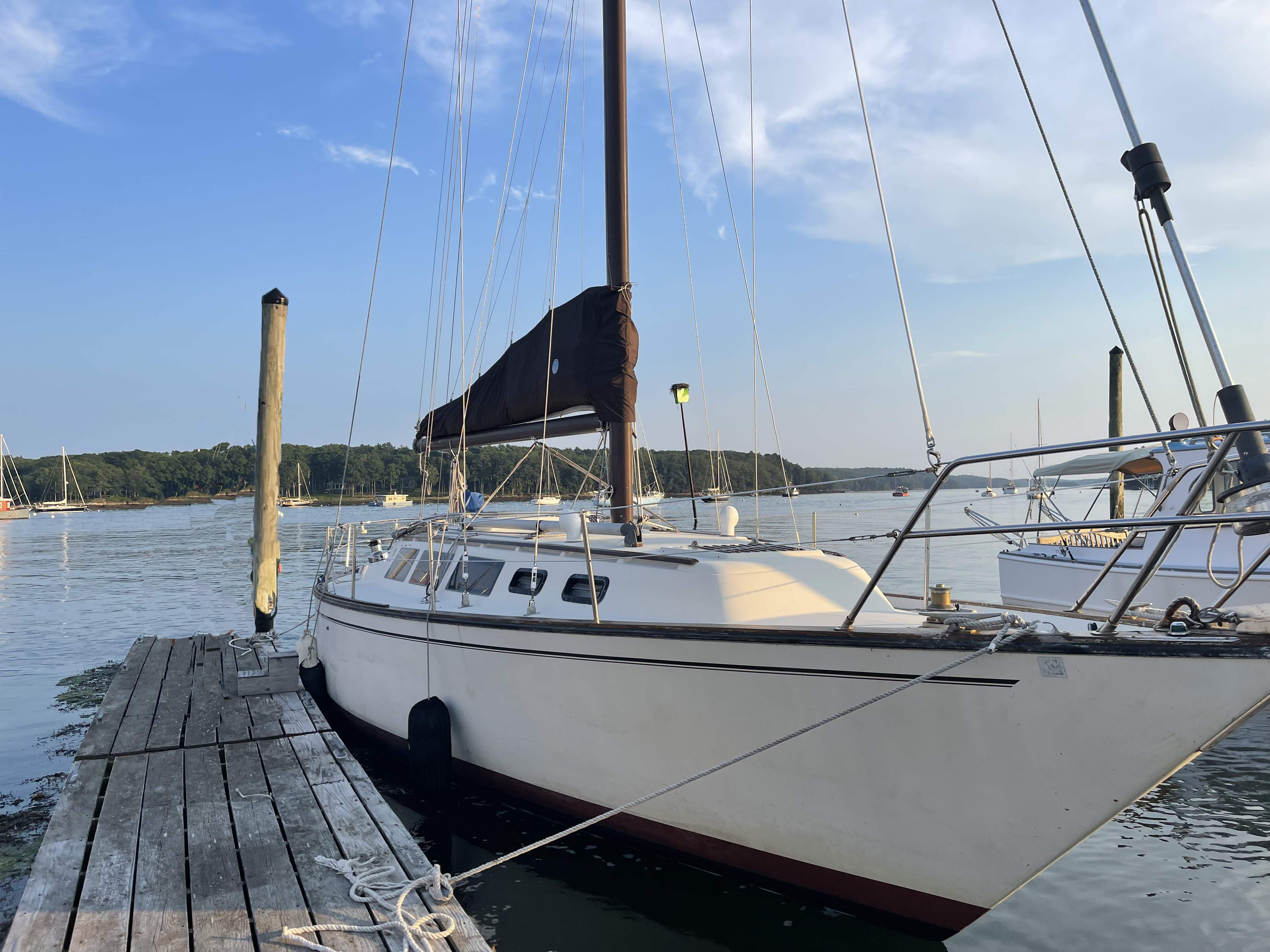
1979 S2 11.0A yacht designed by Arthur Edmunds

== Designs ==
Edmunds is credited with designing 29 sailboats as well as motor boats.

=== Sailboats ===
Year	Manufacturer	Model	Size
1966	Chris Craft	Cherokee 22	9.8-meter
1968	Chris Craft	Comanche 42	12.8-meter
1971	Allied Boat Company	Mistress 39	12.1 meters
1972	Allied Boat Company	Princess 36	11.0 meters
1973	Allied Boat Company	Contessa 36	11.0 meters
1975	S2 Yachts	S2 7.0	7.0 meters
1975	S2 Yachts	S2 8.0C	8.0 meters
1976	S2 Yachts	S2 8.0 B SD	7.9 meters
1976	S2 Yachts	S2 8.0B Sail Drive	7.9 meters
1976	S2 Yachts	S2 8.0B	8.0 meters
1976	S2 Yachts	S2 6.8	6.8 meters
1977	S2 Yachts	S2 9.2A	9.2 meters
1977	S2 Yachts	S2 9.2C	9.2 meters
1977	S2 Yachts	S2 11.0A	11.0 meters
1977	Allied Boat Company	Wright 40	12.3 meters
1977	Allied Boat Company	Mistress 39 Mk II	11.8 meters
1978	S2 Yachts	S2 7.3	7.3 meters
1979	S2 Yachts	S2 11.0	11.0 meters
1980	S2 Yachts	S2 8.5	8.5 meters
1980	Sovereign Yacht Company	Sovereign 7.0	7.0 meters
1980	S2 Yachts	S2 8.5 SD	8.5 meters
1980	S2 Yachts	S2 11.0C	11.0 meters
1980	Allied Boat Company	Princess 36 Mk II	11.5 meters
1981	Sovereign Yacht Company	Princess 24	7.3 meters
1981	Sovereign Yacht Company	Sovereign 23	7.0 meters
1984	S2 Yachts	S2 8.6 SD	8.5 meters
1984	S2 Yachts	S2 8.6	8.6 meters

=== Motorboats ===
Power Tri

== Sources ==
- Buying a Great Boat, Bristol Fashion Publications, published 2000. ISBN 9781892216359, 1892216353
- Building a Fiberglass Boat, Bristol Fashion Publications, 1999. ISBN 9781892216168, 1892216167
- Designing Power and Sail (with Robert Lollo), Bristol Fashion Publications, 1998. ISBN 9781892216052, 1892216051
- Fiberglass Boat Survey, Bristol Fashion Publications, 1998. ISBN 9781892216076, 1892216078
