= Bay Hen 21 =

Gaff-rigged sharpie sailboat

Development
- Designer: Reuben Trane
- Location: United States
- Year: 1984
- Builders: Florida Bay Boat Company 1984-1987; Mirage Fiberglass 1988-1991; Custom Fiberglass 1992-1997; Sovereign America 1997; Nimble Boats 1998-2003
- Role: Cruiser
- Name: Bay Hen 21

Boat
- Displacement: 900 lb (408 kg)
- Draft: 3.50 ft (1.07 m) with a centerboard down

Hull
- Type: monohull
- Construction: fiberglass
- LOA: 21.00 ft (6.40 m)
- LWL: 18.25 ft (5.56 m)
- Beam: 6.25 ft (1.91 m)
- Engine: outboard motor

Hull appendages
- Keel: centerboard
- Ballast: none
- Rudder: transom-mounted rudder

Rig
- Rig type: Gaff rigged catboat

Sails
- Sailplan: catboat
- Mainsail area: 175.00 sq ft (16.258 m^{2})
- Total sail area: 175.00 sq ft (16.258 m^{2})

The Bay Hen 21 is a cat-rigged sharpie with gaff-headed sails built from 1984 to 2003 by several US builders including Custom Fiberglass and Sovereign America.

The design is based on the Lightfoot Sharpie designed by Bob Johnson, creator of the Island Packet Yachts series of boats. The Florida Bay Boat Company, owned by Trane bought the molds and Trane designed a new deck and cabin for the hull to create the Bay Hen 21.

It has twin, retractable centerboards, mounted side by side in separate trunks. It displaces 900 lb (408 kg) and carries no ballast. The boat has a draft of 3.50 ft (1.07 m) with a centerboard extended and 9 in (23 cm) with both retracted. A small outboard motor can be mounted in a stern well, forward of the rudder. It has a hull speed of 5.7 kn (10.6 km/h).

It has two berths. The galley is located under the companionway ladder and is a pull-out design. Cabin headroom is 39 in (99 cm).
