= Sovereign Yachts =

American sailboat building company

- Type: Privately held company
- Industry: Boat building
- Founded: 1978
- Founder: Daniel Steeg
- Defunct: 1998
- Headquarters: Port Richey, Florida, United States
- Products: Sailboats
- Parent: Custom Fiberglass Products

Sovereign Yachts was an American boat builder based in Port Richey, Florida. The company specialized in the design and manufacture of fiberglass sailboats.

The company was founded by Daniel Steeg in 1978 and closed in 1998.

== History ==
Steeg started the company in 1978 and produced a line of sailboats that included the Sovereign 17, Sovereign 7.0 and the Antares 17. The company went out of business after ten years, in 1988.

The company did not name who their designers were for many of their boats, like the Sovereign 17 and credited them as the "Sovereign Design Group".

Custom Fiberglass Products of Florida (CFPF) was founded by Robbie Bowen and built fiberglass boat components for other builders under contract, including decks liners and hulls for Captiva Yachts and Sovereign Yachts. When Sovereign Yachts ceased business in 1988, CFPF bought the assets, including ownership of the hull molds and started producing the boats, under the Sovereign Yachts name, the former company essentially becoming a brand. The existing boats were sold under a variety of new designations and with minor changes from year to year. The Sovereign 20 was added to the product line. In 1992 the small cruising boats designed by Reuban Trane were also added, including his Peep Hen, Mud Hen and Bay Hen 21.

CFPF went out of business in 1994, but one of their salesmen, Terry Chapman, bought the molds and the rights to the designs. In 1996 he started a new company to produce the boats, Sovereign 96. The company quickly encountered financial issues and was bought out by Jim MacDougald that same year. He founded Sovereign America, Inc to produce the designs.

Sovereign America, Inc lasted two years, going out of business in 1998 and the molds were acquired by Nimble Boats Works Inc of Tampa, Florida, who built Trane's Peep Hen design. Nimble Boats remained in business in 2022, but no longer produced sailboats.

== Boats ==
Summary of boats built by Sovereign Yachts:

- Sovereign 7.0 – 1980
- Sovereign 17 – 1980
- Sovereign 23 – 1981
- Sovereign 24 – 1981
- Sovereign Princess 24 – 1981
- Sovereign 20 – 1982
- Sovereign 26 – 1982
- Sovereign 28 – 1983
- Antares 17 – 1987
- Captiva 35 – 1988
- Captiva 240 – 1988
- Bay Hen 21 – 1992
- Mud Hen 17 – 1992
- Peep Hen – 1992
- Sanibel 18 – 1992
- Sovereign 30 – 1992

== See also ==
- List of sailboat designers and manufacturers
