= S2 6.7 =

1980s US recreational keelboat

Development
- Designer: Don Wennersten
- Location: United States
- Year: 1980
- No. built: 142 lifting keel, 18 fixed keel
- Builder: S2 Yachts
- Role: Racer-Cruiser

Boat
- Displacement: 2,200 lb (998 kg)
- Draft: 4.50 ft (1.37 m) with lifting keel down

Hull
- Type: monohull
- Construction: fiberglass
- LOA: 22.00 ft (6.71 m)
- LWL: 18.75 ft (5.72 m)
- Beam: 8.00 ft (2.44 m)
- Engine: outboard motor

Hull appendages
- Keel: lifting keel
- Ballast: 770 lb (349 kg)
- Rudder: transom-mounted rudder

Rig
- Rig type: Bermuda rig
- I foretriangle height: 24.50 ft (7.47 m)
- J foretriangle base: 7.50 ft (2.29 m)
- P mainsail luff: 26.00 ft (7.92 m)
- E mainsail foot: 10.33 ft (3.15 m)

Sails
- Sailplan: fractional rigged sloop
- Mainsail area: 134.29 sq ft (12.476 m^{2})
- Jib/genoa area: 91.88 sq ft (8.536 m^{2})
- Total sail area: 226.17 sq ft (21.012 m^{2})

Racing
- PHRF: 205

The S2 6.7 Grand Slam is an American trailerable sailboat that was designed by Don Wennersten as a racer-cruiser and first built in 1980. The designation indicates the approximate length overall in meters.

The S2 6.7 was developed into the S2 6.9 in 1983.

== Production ==
The design was built by S2 Yachts in Holland, Michigan, United States. Between 1980 and 1983, 142 lifting keel boats were completed, plus 18 fixed keel models, but it is now out of production.

== Design ==
The S2 6.9 is a recreational keelboat, built predominantly of fiberglass. It has a fractional sloop rig, a raked stem, a plumb transom, a transom-hung rudder controlled by a tiller and a lifting keel or fixed fin keel. Both versions displace 2,200 lb (998 kg) and carry 770 lb (349 kg) of lead ballast.

The fixed keel-equipped version of the boat has a draft of 4.50 ft (1.37 m), while the lifting keel-equipped version has a draft of 4.50 ft (1.37 m) with the centerboard extended and 10 in (25 cm) with it retracted, allowing operation in shallow water, beaching or ground transportation on a trailer.

The boat is normally fitted with a small 3 to 6 hp (2 to 4 kW) outboard motor for docking and maneuvering.

The design has sleeping accommodation for four people, with a double "V"-berth in the bow cabin and two straight settee berths in the main cabin. The galley is located on the port side just aft of the bow cabin. The head is located in the bow cabin under the "V"-berth. Cabin headroom is 48 in (122 cm).

For sailing downwind the design may be equipped with a symmetrical spinnaker.

The design has a PHRF racing average handicap of 205 and a hull speed of 5.8 kn (10.7 km/h).

== Operational history ==
In a December 1979 review in Cruising World, at the time of the boat's introduction, George Day wrote, "from the builder of a wide range of cruising boats, the S2 6.7 was designed by Don Wennerstern and the S2 Design Group to be a dual-purpose, family boat capable of rounding the buoys smartly and carrying a couple on a weekend cruise. She has a tall rig with a fractional foretriangle that will power the light hull well in all airs. Under the water she has a retractable keel and rudder which make her easily trailerable and capable of skimming right up to a beach."

In a 2010 review Steve Henkel wrote, "Best features: ... the S2 6.7 ... hull ... [has] practically nothing below the waterline with the lifting keel in the up position, making launching and retrieving on a trailer a comparatively easy job. The PHRF seems a bit high (or is the Beneteau First 210 too low?) for boats of this type ... Worst features: ... the heavy lifting keel and its attendant winch is bound to cause problems sooner or later, just by the nature of the beast."

== See also ==
- List of sailing boat types
