= S2 7.0 =

Sailboat class

Development
- Designer: Arthur Edmunds
- Location: United States
- Year: 1975
- No. built: 140
- Builder: S2 Yachts
- Role: Cruiser
- Name: S2 7.0

Boat
- Displacement: 3,800 lb (1,724 kg)
- Draft: 4.67 ft (1.42 m) with centerboard down

Hull
- Type: monohull
- Construction: fiberglass
- LOA: 23.00 ft (7.01 m)
- LWL: 18.33 ft (5.59 m)
- Beam: 8.00 ft (2.44 m)
- Engine: outboard motor

Hull appendages
- Keel: stub keel and centerboard
- Ballast: 1,300 lb (590 kg)
- Rudder: transom-mounted rudder

Rig
- Rig type: Bermuda rig
- I foretriangle height: 29.00 ft (8.84 m)
- J foretriangle base: 10.20 ft (3.11 m)
- P mainsail luff: 24.00 ft (7.32 m)
- E mainsail foot: 8.00 ft (2.44 m)

Sails
- Sailplan: masthead sloop
- Mainsail area: 96.00 sq ft (8.919 m^{2})
- Jib/genoa area: 147.90 sq ft (13.740 m^{2})
- Total sail area: 243.90 sq ft (22.659 m^{2})

Racing
- PHRF: 261

The S2 7.0 is a recreational keelboat. The designation indicates the approximate length overall in meters. The hull molds for the S2 7.0 were later used for the Sovereign 23 and Sovereign 24 sailboats. It was built by S2 Yachts in Holland, Michigan, United States from 1975 until 1977, with 140 boats completed.

== Design ==
The S2 7.0 is built predominantly of fiberglass, with wood trim. It has a masthead sloop rig, a raked stem, a slightly angled transom, a transom-hung rudder controlled by a tiller and a fixed stub keel, with a retractable centerboard. It displaces 3,800 lb (1,724 kg) and carries 1,300 lb (590 kg) of ballast.

The boat has a draft of 4.67 ft (1.42 m) with the centerboard extended and 2.16 ft (0.66 m) with it retracted, allowing operation in shallow water or ground transportation on a trailer.

The boat is normally fitted with a small 3 to 6 hp (2 to 4 kW) outboard motor for docking and maneuvering.

The design has sleeping accommodation for four people, with a double "V"-berth in the bow cabin and two a straight settee berths in the main cabin. The galley is located on the starboard side at the companionway ladder. The galley is equipped with an ice box and a sink. The enclosed head is located at the companionway on the port side. Cabin headroom is 60 in (152 cm).

The design has a PHRF racing average handicap of 261 and a hull speed of 6.0 kn (11.1 km/h).

== Reception ==
In a 2010 review Steve Henkel wrote, "Arthur Edmunds had his own design office for over 30 years, wrote the book Designing Power and Sail in 1998, and designed boats for Chris Craft and for Allied Boat Company (notably the Allied Princess 36 and Mistress 38). He fashioned this little vessel for S2 Yachts in 1975. She is a keel-centerboarder ... she is on the heavy side for a sailboat only 22 feet on deck ... Best features: Headroom at 5' 0" is quite good for a 22-footer ... She is definitely a cruiser, not a racer, so her PHRF of 261, while high, will not be of concern to most potential owners. Worst features: Her accommodation design and domed cabin may not appeal to everybody. That may be why her builders left her on the market for only three years."
