= Dodger (sailing) =

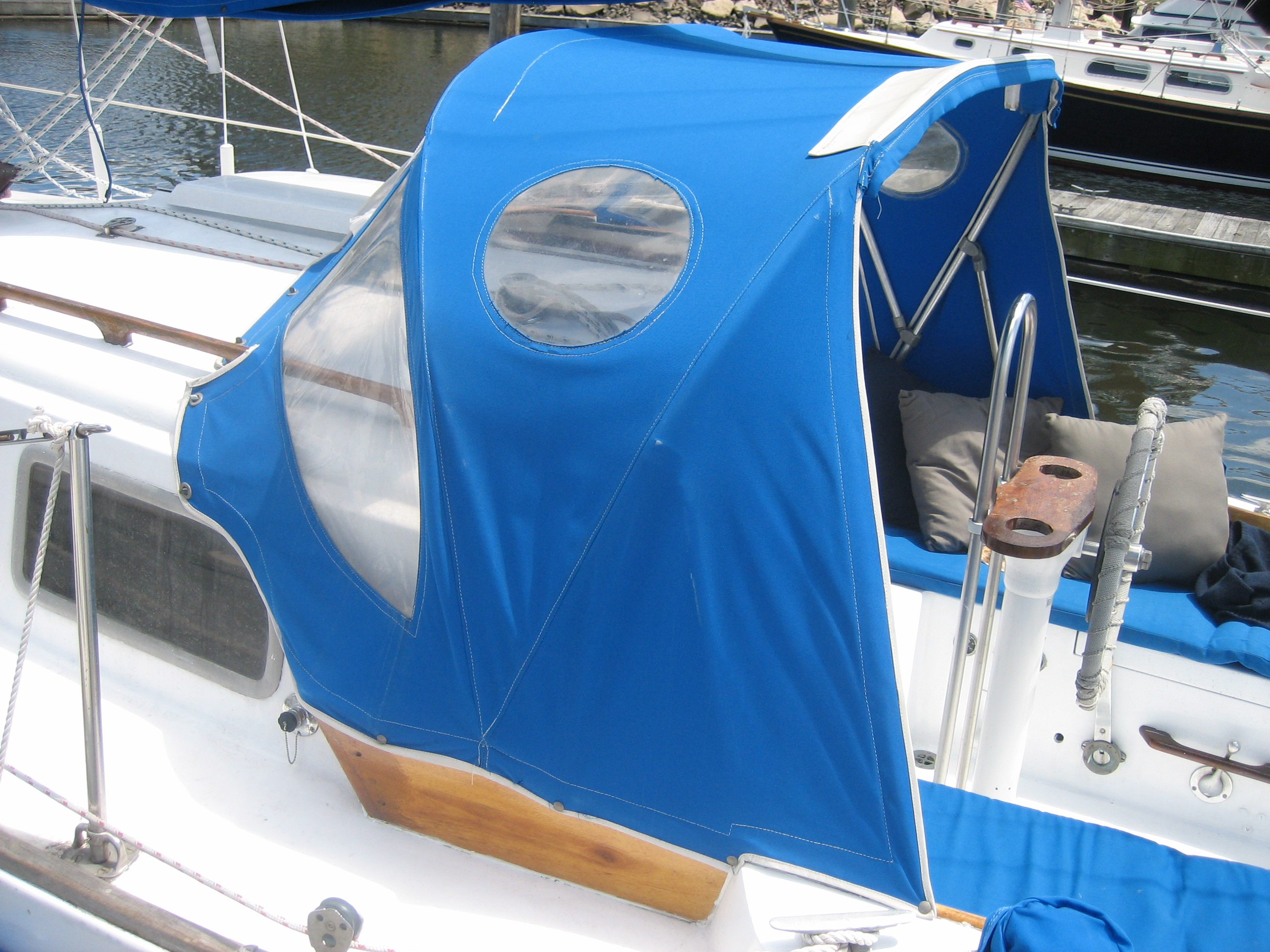

A dodger (also known as a spray-hood) is a frame-supported canvas (usually with clear vinyl windows) structure partially protecting a helmsman and other occupants of a sailboat from harsh weather and seas.

The dodger typically covers part of the cockpit and the entrance (or "companionway") into the interior of the sailboat. One can usually stand under a dodger and be protected from rain, spray and snow travelling straight down or from the front/fore of the craft. There is little protection afforded from elements moving from aft to fore, but since the boat is usually going forward or anchored by the bow and therefore facing into the wind, this is rarely a problem. A similar type of shelter on a boat, without the forward and side protection, is called a Bimini top. Increased protection for the occupants of the cockpit is possible using a combination of dodgers/bimini tops and dodger extension.

A dodger of good design should not interfere with sailing and should enable easy access into the entrance/companionway. Modern dodgers are increasingly designed using photogrammetry and 3D scanning, which allows for a more precise fit around complex deck geometries compared to traditional manual patterning.
