= Skunk 11 =

Sailboat class

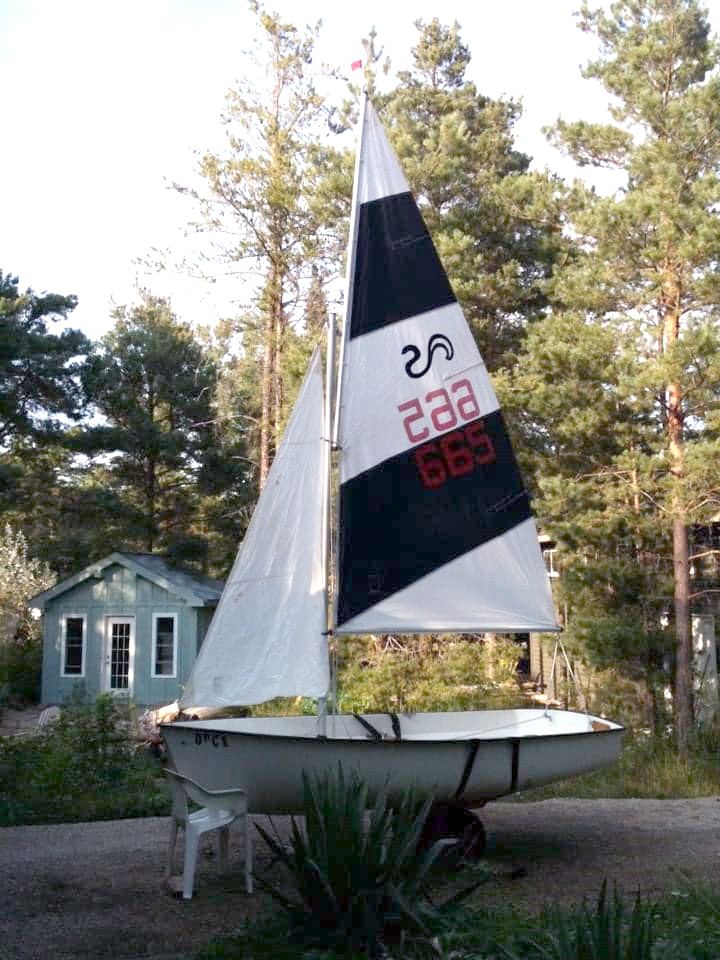
- Skunk rigged on portage wheels

Development
- Designer: Hubert Vandestadt
- Location: Canada
- Year: 1969
- No. built: 1200
- Builder: Vandestadt & McGruer
- Role: Dinghy
- Name: Skunk 11

Boat
- Displacement: 190 lb (86 kg)
- Draft: 2.50 ft (0.76 m) with centreboard down

Hull
- Type: Monohull
- Construction: Fibreglass
- LOA: 11.08 ft (3.38 m)
- LWL: 9.50 ft (2.90 m)
- Beam: 5.42 ft (1.65 m)

Hull appendages
- Keel: centreboard
- Rudder: transom-mounted rudder

Rig
- Rig type: Gunter rig

Sails
- Sailplan: Gunter rigged sloop Masthead sloop
- Total sail area: 70 sq ft (6.5 m^{2})

The Skunk 11 is a Canadian utility dinghy that can be rowed, used as a motorboat, fishing boat or as a sailing dinghy. It was designed by Hubert Vandestadt and first built in 1969.

== Production ==
The design was built by Vandestadt & McGruer in Owen Sound, Ontario, Canada, but the company went out of business in 1987 and production had ended by then.

== Design ==
The Skunk 11 is a recreational sailboat, built predominantly of fibreglass, with wood trim. It is a Gunter rigged sloop with a free-standing mast, aluminum spars, a raked stem, plumb transom, a transom-hung rudder made from mahogany controlled by a tiller and a retractable fibreglass centreboard. The rudder and centreboard are "kick up" designs. It displaces 190 lb (86 kg).

The boat has a draft of 2.50 ft (0.76 m) with the centreboard extended and 0.50 ft (0.15 m) with it retracted, allowing beaching or ground transportation on a trailer or car roof rack.

The boat may also be rowed and is equipped with oarlocks for that role. The transom is reinforced so the boat can be fitted with a small outboard motor of up to 5 hp (4 kW) for employment as a motorboat.

The recessed foredeck has a storage area.

== Variants ==
Skunk
This model was introduced in 1969 and has a gunter rig and a sail area of 70 sq ft (6.5 m^{2}). The gunter rig mean all three spars are short and will store inside the boat's hull.
Super Skunk
This model was introduced in 1981, has a conventional sloop rig and additional sail area, totalling 88 sq ft (8.2 m^{2}).

== Operational history ==
In a 1994 review Richard Sherwood wrote, the "Skunk is a light, easily transported boat. Because of the gunter rig, all spars will fit inside the boat. There are no stays. The Super Skunk is Marconi rigged and has an extra 10 square feet of mainsail. Besides sailing, the Skunk may be used for fishing, as an outboard, or as a rowboat."

== See also ==
- List of sailing boat types

Similar boats

- Blue Crab 11
- Echo 12
- Puffer (dinghy)
- Shrimp (dinghy)
