= Puffer (dinghy) =

Sailboat class

Development
- Designer: Fred Scott
- Location: United States
- Year: 1972
- No. built: 5,000
- Builder: American Machine and Foundry
- Role: Dinghy
- Name: Puffer

Boat
- Displacement: 160 lb (73 kg)
- Draft: 2.82 ft (0.86 m) with daggerboard down

Hull
- Type: Monohull
- Construction: Fiberglass
- LOA: 12.50 ft (3.81 m)
- LWL: 11.50 ft (3.51 m)
- Beam: 4.83 ft (1.47 m)

Hull appendages
- Keel: daggerboard
- Rudder: transom-mounted rudder

Rig
- Rig type: Bermuda rig

Sails
- Sailplan: Fractional rigged sloop
- Mainsail area: 55 sq ft (5.1 m^{2})
- Jib/genoa area: 35 sq ft (3.3 m^{2})
- Spinnaker area: 100 sq ft (9.3 m^{2})
- Total sail area: 90 sq ft (8.4 m^{2})

Racing
- D-PN: 110.1

The Puffer is an American rowboat, motorboat and sailing dinghy that was designed by Fred Scott and first built in 1972.

== Production ==
The design was built in the United States by AMF Alcort, a division of American Machine and Foundry that had been acquired in 1969. The company completed 5,000 examples of the Puffer design starting in 1972, but it is now out of production.

== Design ==
The Puffer is a recreational sailboat, built predominantly of fiberglass, with a double hull and molded seats. It has a fractional sloop rig with a loose-footed mainsail, aluminum spars, a spooned and nearly plumb stem, a vertical transom, a transom-hung, kick-up mahogany rudder, swept aft and controlled by a tiller, plus a retractable mahogany daggerboard. It displaces 160 lb (73 kg), has a spinnaker of 100 sq ft (9.3 m^{2}) and adjustable jib fairleads.

The boat has a draft of 2.82 ft (0.86 m) with the daggerboard extended and 4 in (10 cm) with it retracted, allowing beaching or ground transportation on a trailer or car roof rack.

The boat has a motor mount so that it can be fitted with a small outboard motor. It was also supplied with oarlocks to allow rowing.

For sailing the design is equipped with hiking straps, boom downhaul and an outhaul. It also has positive foam flotation. It is normally raced with a crew of one to three sailors.

The design has a Portsmouth Yardstick racing average handicap of 110.1.

== Operational history ==
In a 1994 review Richard Sherwood wrote, the "Puffer may be sailed or rowed, so she comes with oarlocks. There is also a motor mount. Seats are molded into the double hull, and there is foam under the benches in case both hulls are holed."

== See also ==
- List of sailing boat types

Similar sailboats

- Blue Crab 11
- Echo 12
- Shrimp (dinghy)
- Skunk 11
