= Echo 12 =

Sailboat class

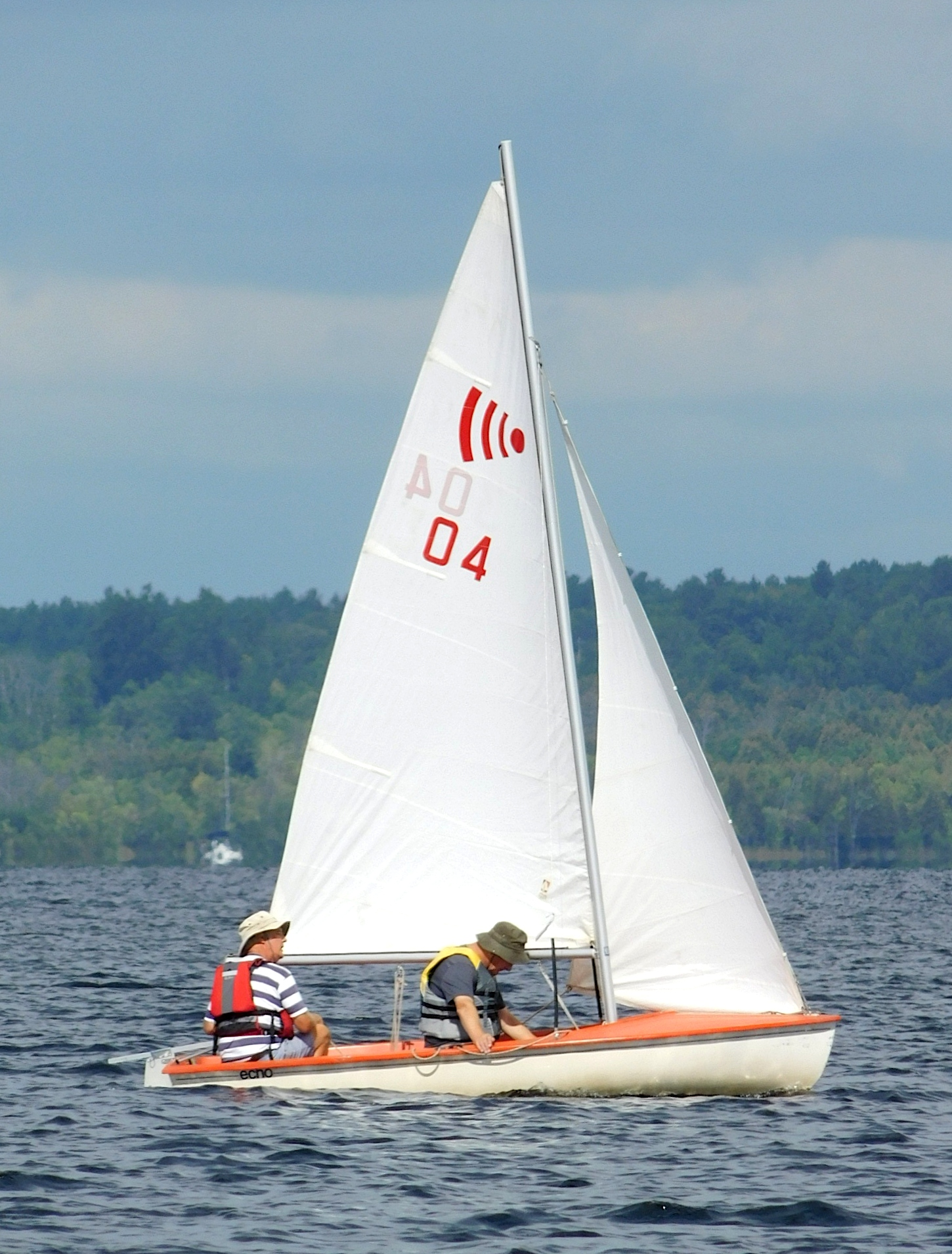

Development
- Location: Canada
- Year: 1979
- Builders: C&L Boatworks; Skene Boats
- Role: Dinghy
- Name: Echo 12

Boat
- Crew: Two
- Displacement: 140 lb (64 kg)
- Draft: 1.50 ft (0.46 m) with daggerboard down

Hull
- Type: Monohull
- Construction: Fibreglass
- LOA: 11.83 ft (3.61 m)
- Beam: 4.92 ft (1.50 m)

Hull appendages
- Keel: daggerboard
- Rudder: transom-mounted rudder

Rig
- Rig type: Bermuda rig

Sails
- Sailplan: Fractional rigged sloop Masthead sloop
- Total sail area: 92.00 sq ft (8.547 m^{2})

The Echo 12 is a Canadian rowboat, motorboat and sailing dinghy that was first built in 1979.

The Echo 12 is a development of the West German Koralle Junior.

== Production ==
The design is built by C&L Boatworks in Belleville, Ontario and was at one time also built by Skene Boats of Gloucester, Ontario, both located in Canada. The design remains in production by C&L.

== Design ==
The Echo 12 is a recreational sailboat, built predominantly of fibreglass, with wood trim. For sailing it has a fractional sloop rig, with aluminum spars, a raked stem, a plumb transom, a transom-hung, kick-up rudder made from mahogany, controlled by a tiller and a retractable mahogany daggerboard. It displaces 140 lb (64 kg), has a bow storage compartment and may be fitted with a whisker pole. The mainsheet is mounted mid-boom to a block on the cockpit deck.

The boat has a draft of 1.50 ft (0.46 m) with the daggerboard extended and 0.33 ft (0.10 m) with it retracted, allowing beaching or ground transportation on a trailer or car roof rack. The mast is a two-piece design to allow it to be disassembled for car-top transport.

The boat has a motor-mount pad and can be fitted with an outboard motor of up to 5 hp (4 kW). It also was factory-delivered with an athwartships seat and oarlocks for rowing.

For racing the design is usually crewed by two sailors.

== Operational history ==
In a 1994 review Richard Sherwood wrote, "a straightforward beginner's boat, the Echo has been designed for versatility and may also be rowed or powered (with a maximum of five-horsepower outboard). Oarlock sockets are built in, and there is a pad for the motor. A rowing seat runs athwartship."

== See also ==
- List of sailing boat types

Similar sailboats

- Blue Crab 11
- Puffer (dinghy)
- Shrimp (dinghy)
- Skunk 11
