= Cygnus 20 =

Sailboat class

Cygnus 20 FK
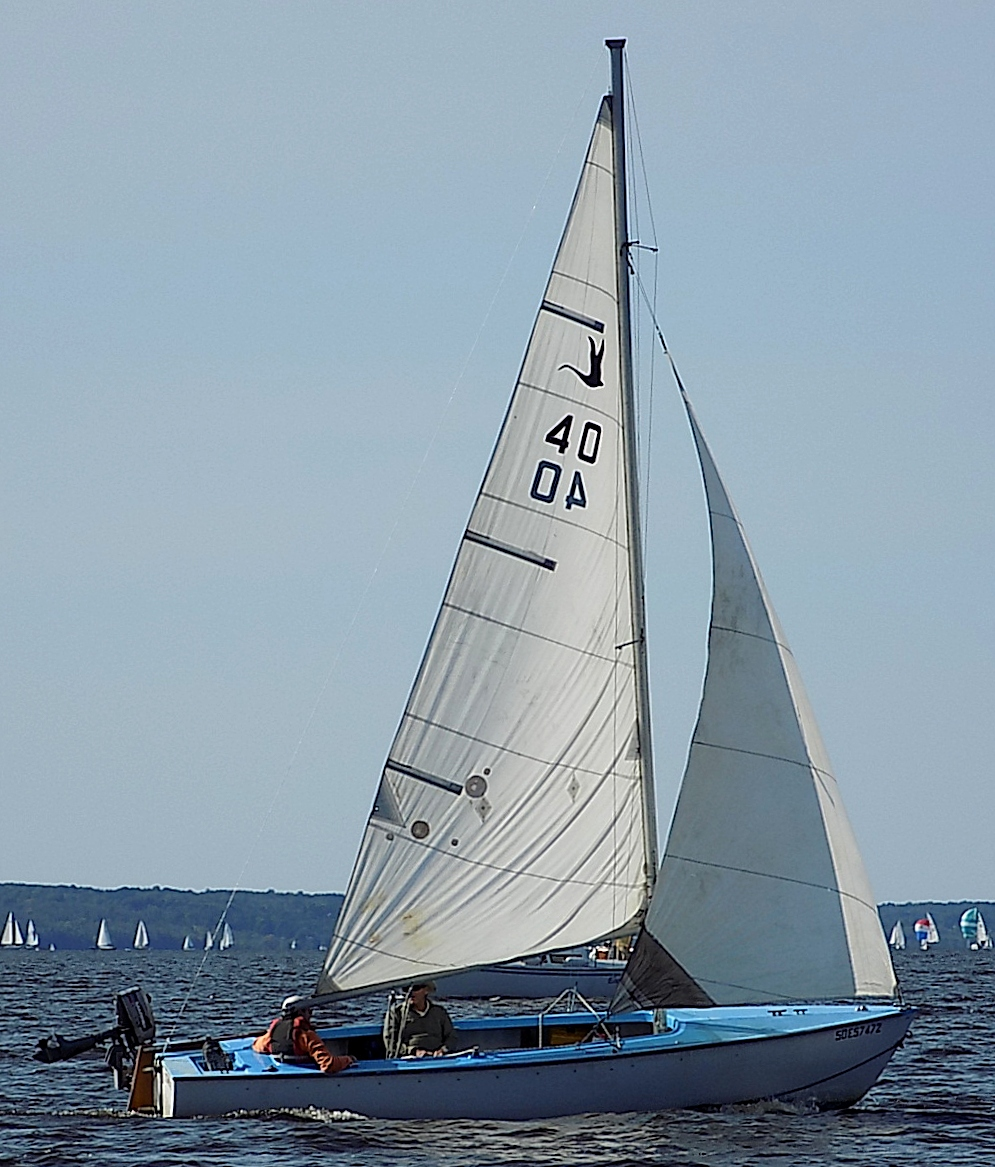
- Cygnus 20 FK

Development
- Designer: George Hinterhoeller
- Location: Canada
- Year: 1963
- Builders: Hinterhoeller Yachts; Skene Boats
- Role: Day sailer
- Name: Cygnus 20 FK

Boat
- Displacement: 950 lb (431 kg)
- Draft: 2.75 ft (0.84 m)

Hull
- Type: Monohull
- Construction: Fiberglass
- LOA: 20.00 ft (6.10 m)
- LWL: 17.50 ft (5.33 m)
- Beam: 7.00 ft (2.13 m)
- Engine: Outboard motor

Hull appendages
- Keel: centreboard
- Ballast: 140 lb (64 kg) cast iron
- Rudder: transom-mounted rudder

Rig
- Rig type: Bermuda rig
- I foretriangle height: 18.75 ft (5.72 m)
- J foretriangle base: 6.33 ft (1.93 m)
- P mainsail luff: 23.00 ft (7.01 m)
- E mainsail foot: 10.33 ft (3.15 m)

Sails
- Sailplan: Fractional rigged sloop
- Mainsail area: 118.80 sq ft (11.037 m^{2})
- Jib/genoa area: 59.34 sq ft (5.513 m^{2})
- Total sail area: 178.14 sq ft (16.550 m^{2})

The Cygnus 20 is a Canadian trailerable sailboat that was designed by George Hinterhoeller and first built in 1963.

== Production ==
The design was initially built in 1963 by Hinterhoeller Yachts in Niagara Falls, Ontario, Canada and also by Clarkecraft of St Catharines, Ontario. When Hinterhoeller Yachts was absorbed into C&C Yachts in 1969, the Cygnus 20 tooling was sold to Skene Boats of Gloucester, Ontario. Skene Boats went out of business in 1992 and the design went out of production.

The centreboard boat was originally sold under the name HR 20, but after a class association was formed in 1965-66 the design was renamed the Cygnus 20. It was produced in both centreboard and fixed keel versions from 1965.

== Design ==
The Cygnus 20 is a recreational centreboard boat, or optionally a keelboat, built predominantly of fibreglass, with teak wooden trim above decks and mahogany below decks. It has a fractional sloop rig with aluminum spars, a spooned raked stem, a vertical transom, a transom-hung wooden rudder controlled by a tiller and a centreboard or fixed fin keel. It has a fibreglass buoyancy tank. Normally an open boat, it can be fitted with a detachable cuddy cabin top and was advertised as being able to accommodate four people for overnight sleeping. For stowage it has an aft lazarette.

The boat is normally fitted with a small 3.5 to 6 hp (3 to 4 kW) outboard motor for docking and manoeuvring.

== Variants ==
Cygnus 20
This centreboard-equipped model displaces 600 lb (272 kg). The boat has a draft of 2.67 ft (0.81 m) with the steel centreboard extended and 8 in (20 cm) with it retracted, allowing beaching or ground transportation on a trailer.
Cygnus 20 FK
This fixed-keel model displaces 950 lb (431 kg) and carries 140 lb (64 kg) of cast iron ballast. The boat has a draft of 2.75 ft (0.84 m) with the standard keel fitted.

== See also ==
- List of sailing boat types
