= Sirius 22 =

Canadian recreational keelboat

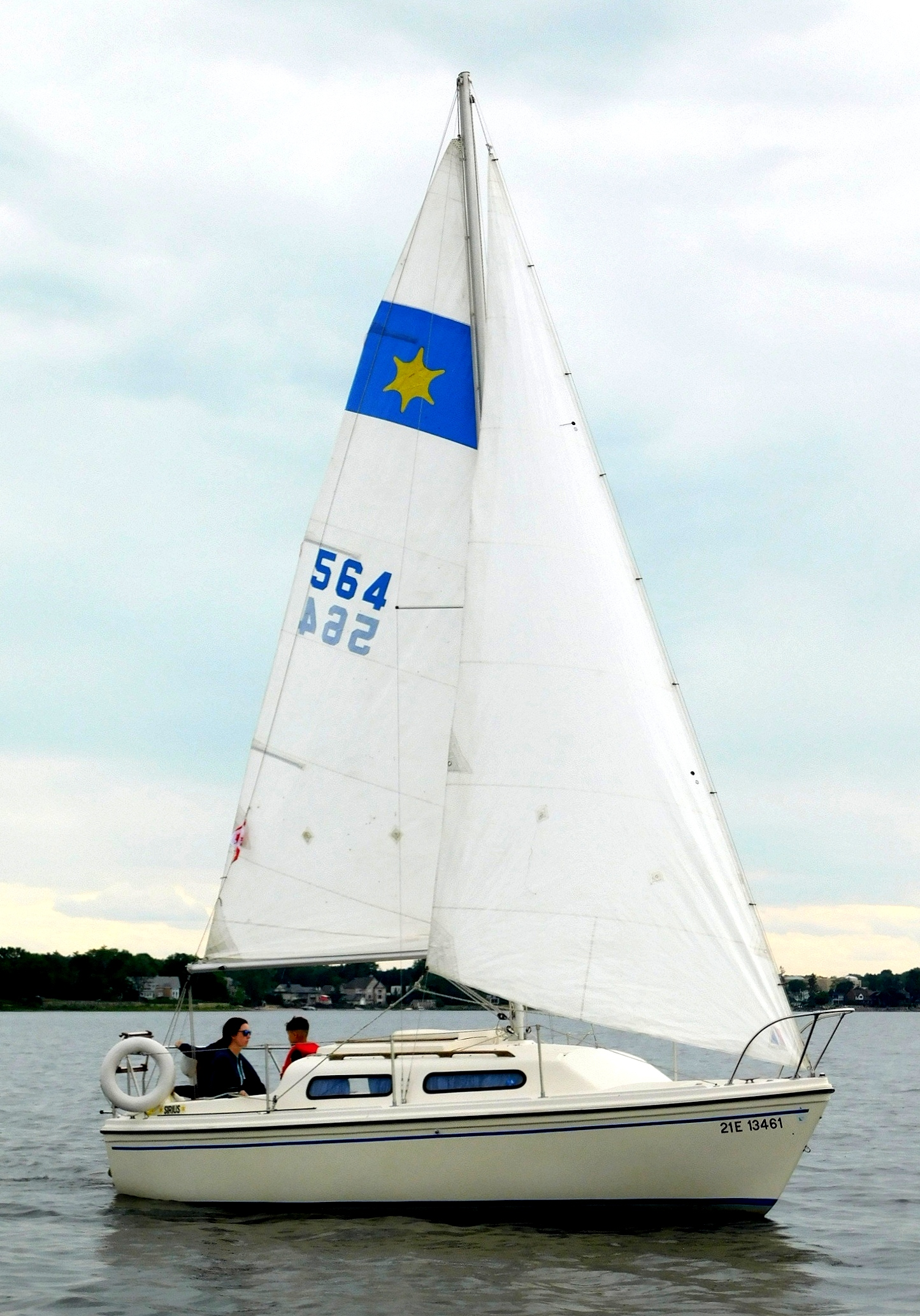
- Sirius 21

Development
- Designer: Hubert Vandestadt
- Location: Canada
- Year: circa 1981
- No. built: 600
- Builder: Vandestadt and McGruer
- Role: Cruiser
- Name: Sirius 22

Boat
- Displacement: 2,000 lb (907 kg)
- Draft: 5.00 ft (1.52 m) with keel down

Hull
- Type: Monohull
- Construction: Fibreglass
- LOA: 21.00 ft (6.40 m)
- LWL: 18.75 ft (5.72 m)
- Beam: 7.92 ft (2.41 m)
- Engine: Outboard motor

Hull appendages
- Keel: lifting keel
- Ballast: 525 lb (238 kg)
- Rudder: transom-mounted rudder

Rig
- Rig type: Bermuda rig
- I foretriangle height: 25.00 ft (7.62 m)
- J foretriangle base: 8.50 ft (2.59 m)
- P mainsail luff: 22.00 ft (6.71 m)
- E mainsail foot: 9.00 ft (2.74 m)

Sails
- Sailplan: Masthead sloop
- Mainsail area: 99.00 sq ft (9.197 m^{2})
- Jib/genoa area: 106.25 sq ft (9.871 m^{2})
- Total sail area: 205.25 sq ft (19.068 m^{2})

Racing
- PHRF: 258

The Sirius 20, 21 and 22 are a family of Canadian trailerable sailboats that was designed by Hubert Vandestadt for cruising and first built in 1976.

== Production ==
The series of boats was built by Vandestadt and McGruer Limited in Owen Sound, Ontario, Canada, from 1976 until 1987 when the company went out of business. More than 600 boats were completed.

== Design ==
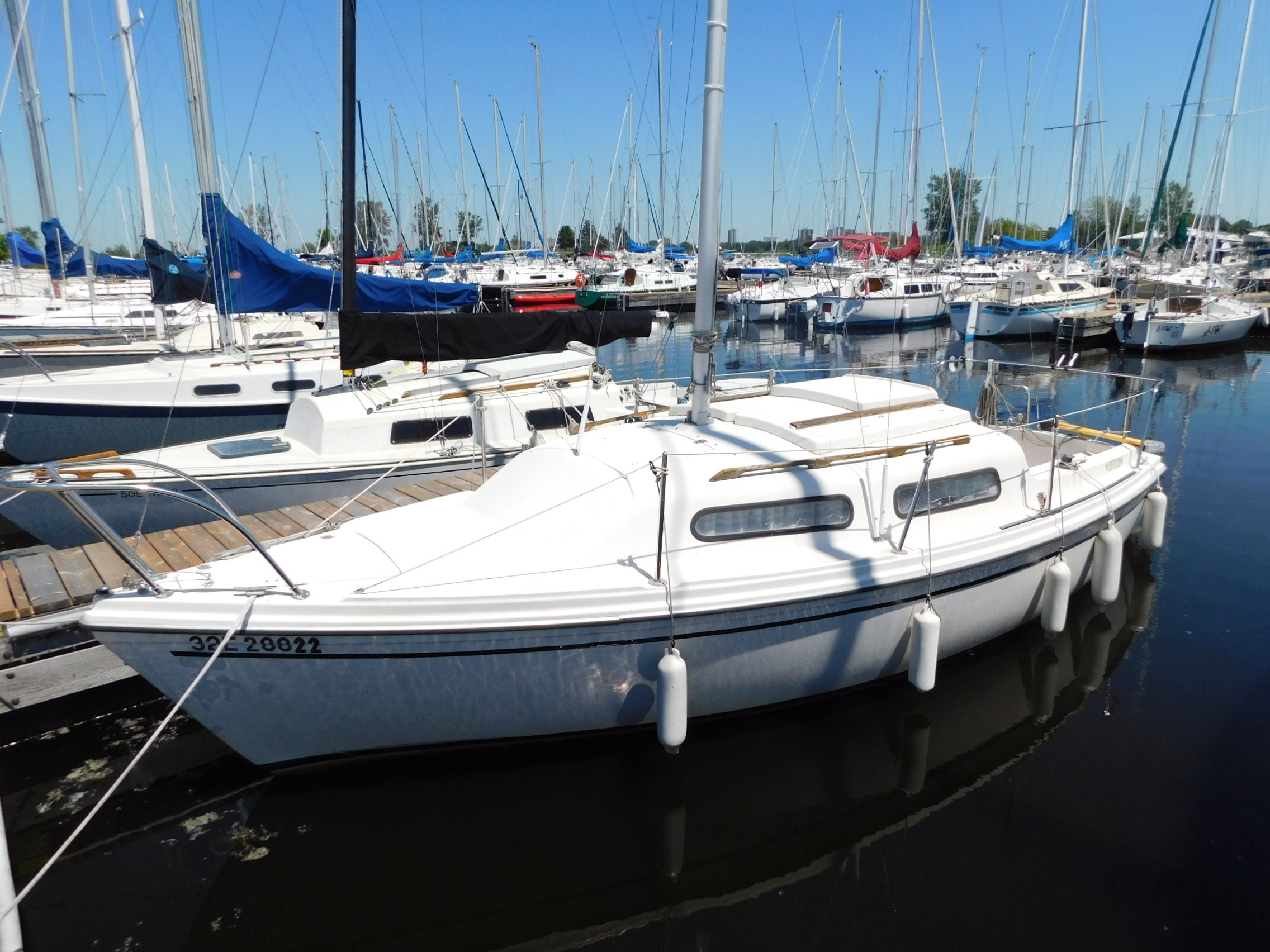
Sirius 21

The designs are all recreational keelboats, built predominantly of fibreglass, with wood trim and aluminum spars. They all have transom-hung, kick-up rudders controlled by a tiller and iron swing keels that can be locked down. A fixed, lead, fin keel was an option on the 21 and 22. All models displace 2,000 lb (907 kg), carry 525 lb (238 kg) of iron ballast and are normally fitted with a small outboard motor for docking and manoeuvring.

All the swing keel-equipped models have drafts of 5.00 ft (1.52 m) with the keel down and 1.33 ft (0.41 m) with it retracted.

The design has sleeping accommodations for five people, plus a dinette table and a galley. A sink, fresh water tank with a capacity of 5 U.S. gallons (19 L; 4.2 imp gal) and a water pump were factory options. The interior is finished in teak trim. Cabin headroom is 57 in (145 cm).

For sailing the boat is equipped with a boom vang, topping lift and jiffy reefing. The cabin is equipped with a pop-up top as standard equipment, which necessitates a high boom position.

The boat is normally fitted with a small 3 to 6 hp (2 to 4 kW) outboard motor for docking and manoeuvring.

The design has a PHRF racing average handicap of 258 and a hull speed of 5.8 kn (10.7 km/h).

== Variants ==
Sirius 20
This model was introduced in 1976. It has a length overall of 21.17 ft (6.5 m), a waterline length of 18.75 ft (5.7 m), a fractional rig, a raked stem and a plumb transom.
Sirius 21
This model was introduced in 1977 and includes positive flotation in the form of closed-cell foam injected into some interior compartments as well as in-between the hull and liner. This innovation increased costs, but increased safety. The Sirius 21 has a length overall of 21.00 ft (6.4 m), a waterline length of 18.75 ft (5.7 m), a masthead sloop rig, a raked stem, a plumb transom and a pop-up top.
Sirius 22
This model was introduced in the early 1980s and produced until the manufacturer closed down in 1987. It has a length overall of 21.00 ft (6.4 m), a waterline length of 18.75 ft (5.7 m), a masthead sloop rig, a raked stem, a pop-up top and introduced a reverse transom.

== Reception ==
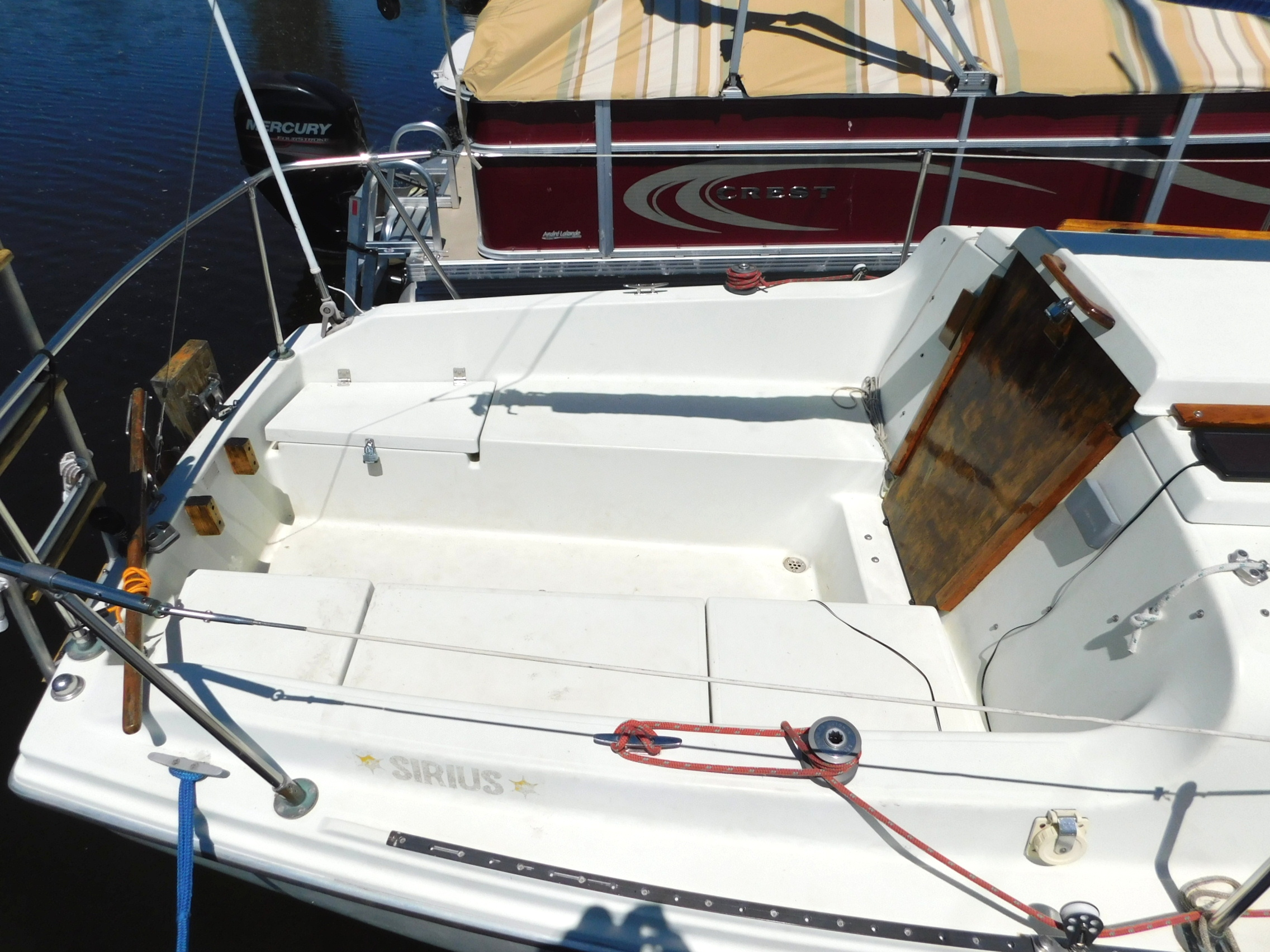
Cockpit of a Sirius 21

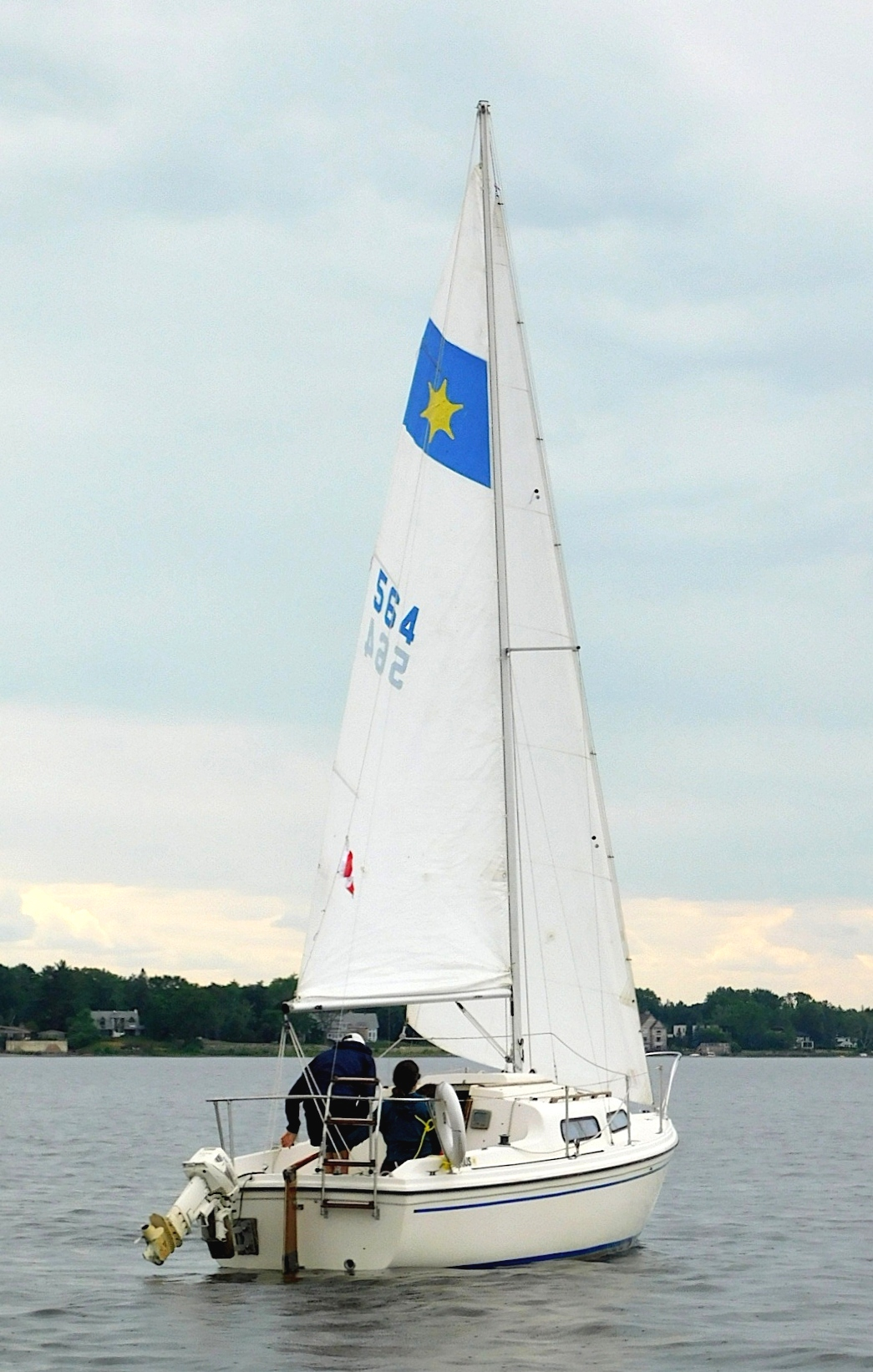
Sirius 21

In a 1994 review, Richard Sherwood wrote: "The Sirius is built in Ontario and is mostly found on the Great Lakes. Sirius has a wide beam; and this, combined with the hard bilge and a retractable cast-iron keel, gives good stability. She is unsinkable and, if the keel is locked down, self-righting."

In a 2002 review Paul Howard wrote, "one gem is the Sirius 21/22 built by Vandestadt and McGruer Ltd. of Owen Sound, Ont. a company which had a strong 25-year history before finally closing its doors in 1987. Designed at Vandestadt, the Sirius 21/22 was an innovative boat and indeed is said to be the first North American production-built, ballasted cruising boat with positive flotation. In a more expensive procedure, closed-cell foam was injected into some compartments, then into the gap between the inner and outer hull the full length and up to the deck level. The foam stiffened the hull, provided sound and head insulation as well as buoyancy. Of course, with foam-injection construction, there is some loss of space in the interior as well as in stowage lockers."

In a 2010 review Steve Henkel described the Sirius 21 as, "a wholesome and respectable-looking trailer- able sailboat for short cruises". He noted of the Sirius 22, "this good-looking vessel and her near sistership both have more space down below than her narrower peers. Her PHRF may be higher than her speed potential indicates from her stats, given her low D/L. Her draft (in the swing-keel version) should make her fairly easy to launch and retrieve at a ramp. Worst features: A cast-iron keel can be a maintenance nuisance."
