= Phoenix 18 =

Sailboat class

Development
- Designer: Dick Gibbs and Rod Macalpine-Downie
- Location: United States
- Year: 1964
- Builders: Gibbs Boat Company; MFG Boat Company; Skene Boats
- Name: Phoenix 18

Boat
- Displacement: 250 lb (113 kg)
- Draft: 2.25 ft (0.69 m) with centerboards down

Hull
- Type: Catamaran
- Construction: fiberglass
- LOA: 18.00 ft (5.49 m)
- LWL: 16.00 ft (4.88 m)
- Beam: 7.92 ft (2.41 m)

Hull appendages
- Keel: twin centerboards
- Rudder: twin transom-mounted rudders

Rig
- Rig type: Bermuda rig

Sails
- Sailplan: fractional rigged sloop
- Total sail area: 235.00 sq ft (21.832 m^{2})

The Phoenix 18 is an American catamaran sailing dinghy that was designed by Dick Gibbs and Rod Macalpine-Downie and first built in 1964.

The boat is a smaller variant of the Shark 20 and a development of the Thai Mark IV.

The boat was named after the mythical bird as it was the first design built by the Gibbs Boat Company after its factory burned down.

== Production ==
The design was built by the Gibbs Boat Company starting in 1964, as well as the MFG Boat Company in the United States, and Skene Boats in Canada. The design is now out of production.

== Design ==
The Phoenix 18 is a recreational sailboat, built predominantly of fiberglass and wood. It has a fractional sloop rig. The twin hulls both have raked stems, plumb transoms, transom-hung rudders controlled by a tiller and a retractable centerboards. It displaces 250 lb (113 kg).

The boat has a draft of 2.25 ft (0.69 m) with a centerboard extended and 4 in (10 cm) with both retracted, allowing operation in shallow water, beaching or ground transportation on a trailer.

== See also ==
- List of sailing boat types
