= Shrimp (dinghy) =

Sailboat class

Development
- Designer: Hubert Vandestadt and Fraser McGruer
- Location: Canada
- Year: 1972
- No. built: 340
- Builder: Vandestadt and McGruer Limited
- Role: Sailing dinghy
- Name: Shrimp

Boat
- Crew: two for racing
- Displacement: 120 lb (54 kg)
- Draft: 2.50 ft (0.76 m) centreboard down

Hull
- Type: Monohull
- Construction: Fibreglass
- LOA: 9.58 ft (2.92 m)
- Beam: 4.83 ft (1.47 m)

Hull appendages
- Keel: centreboard
- Rudder: transom-mounted rudder

Rig
- Rig type: Gunter rig

Sails
- Sailplan: Catboat
- Mainsail area: 50.00 sq ft (4.645 m^{2})
- Total sail area: 50.00 sq ft (4.645 m^{2})

The Shrimp is a Canadian dinghy that was designed by Hubert Vandestadt and Fraser McGruer and first built in 1972. The boat was designed to employed as a powered yacht tender, a rowboat or as a sailing dinghy.

== Production ==
The design was built by Vandestadt and McGruer Limited in Owen Sound, Ontario, Canada. The company completed 340 examples of the type, but the boat went out of production when the company closed in 1987.

== Design ==
The Shrimp is a recreational sailboat, built predominantly of fibreglass, with wood trim. It is a catboat, with a gunter rig, aluminum spars and a loose-footed mainsail. The mast is 15.00 ft (4.57 m) tall from the waterline. The hull design features a raked stem, a plumb transom, a transom-hung rudder controlled by a tiller and a retractable centerboard. It displaces 120 lb (54 kg) and has foam-filled buoyancy tanks to make it unsinkable.

The boat has a draft of 2.50 ft (0.76 m) with the centreboard extended and 0.50 ft (0.15 m) with it retracted. The centreboard and rudder both "kick-up", allowing beaching. The Gunter rig results in three short spars which facilities storage, as well as transportation on a trailer or car roof rack.

When used as a powered tender, the boat is fitted with a small outboard motor. To allow it to be towed a bow eye is fitted.

== Operational history ==
In a 1994 review Richard Sherwood wrote, "a tender, rowboat, outboard, and small training dinghy, the Shrimp has an unusual gunter rig that helps in trailering or car-topping because the spars are short."

== See also ==
- List of sailing boat types

Similar sailboats

- Blue Crab 11
- Echo 12
- Puffer (dinghy)
- Skunk 11
