= Vandestadt and McGruer Limited =

Sailboat manufacturer

- Company type: Privately held company
- Industry: Boat building
- Founded: 1965
- Founder: Fraser McGruer and Hubert Vandestadt
- Defunct: 1988
- Fate: Out of business
- Headquarters: Owen Sound, Ontario, Canada
- Products: Sailboats
- Number of employees: 48

Vandestadt and McGruer Limited (sometimes styled as Vandestadt & McGruer) was a Canadian boat builder based in Owen Sound, Ontario. The company specialized in the design and manufacture of fibreglass sailboats.

The company was founded by Fraser McGruer and Hubert Vandestadt in 1965. Vandestadt was the main designer for the company and also the nephew of naval architect E. G. van de Stadt, a pioneer of 20th century sailboat design.

== History ==
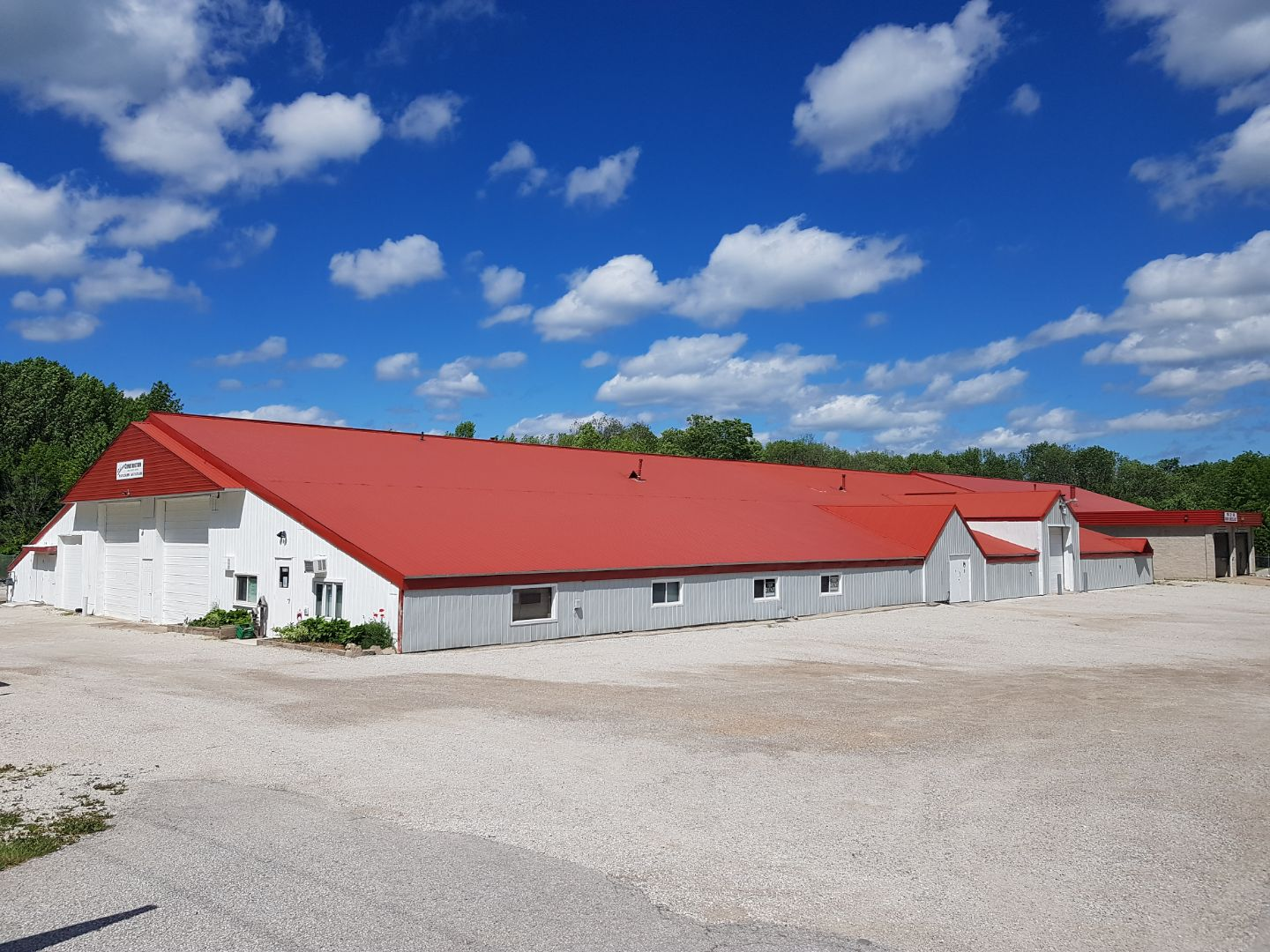
The former Vandestadt and McGruer plant, in 2020

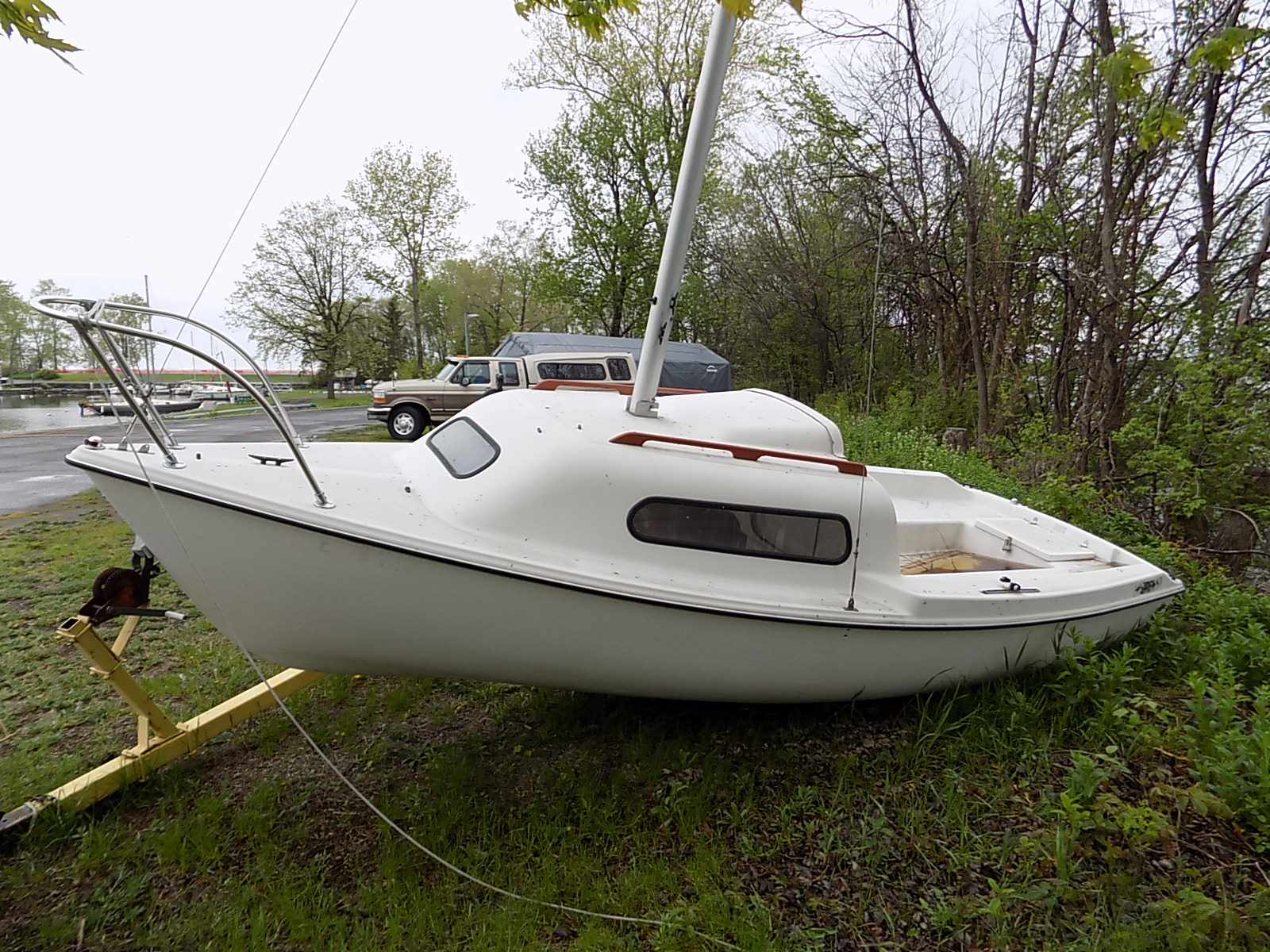
Siren 17

The company imported the trailer sailers built by the MacGregor Yacht Corporation from the United States into Canada and also produced its own line of boats.

The first design produced was the 13.33 ft (4.06 m) Spindrift 13, a small day sailer dinghy in 1965, with 800 boats built. This was followed by the smaller 11.08 ft (3.38 m) Skunk 11 in 1968, of which 1200 were delivered. The next boat was the even smaller 9.58 ft (2.92 m) Shrimp in 1972, with 340 boats completed.

The first keelboat produced was the Siren 17 pocket cruiser, introduced in 1974. With 3,200 boats built, it became one of the most successful Canadian sailboat designs.

The company moved into bigger boats with the Sirius series of keelboats, which commenced with the Sirius 20 in 1976, a design that evolved into the Sirius 21 in 1977 and the Sirius 22 in the early 1980s. The Sirius 28 was introduced in 1982 and finally the Sirius 26 1987.

The Sirius 21 became the first North American production sailboat to use both ballast and positive flotation. Closed-cell foam was injected into some of the boat's compartments and also in between the inner and outer hull to accomplish this, a feature that added cost, but improved safety.

The largest design produced, the Sirius 28 had 120 examples completed between 1982 and 1987.

The company declared bankruptcy in April 1988.

== Boats ==
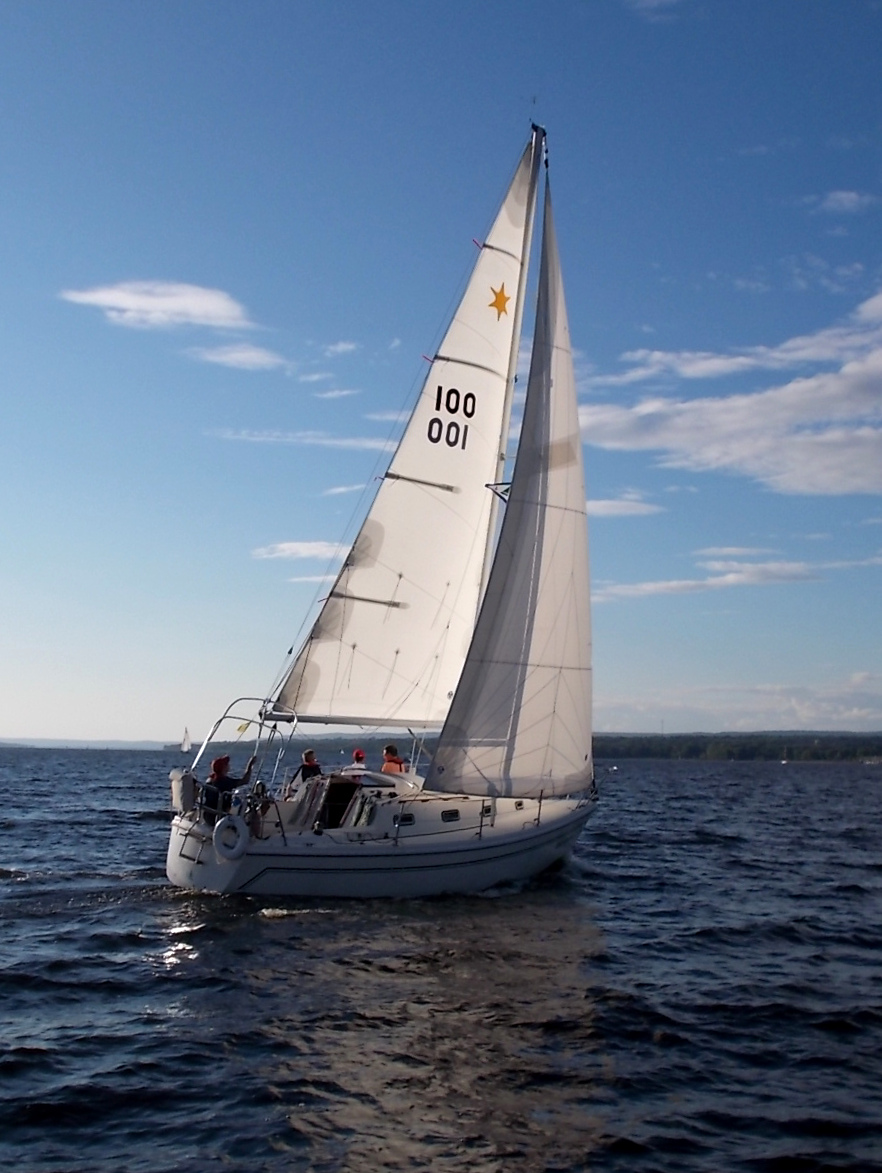
Sirius 28

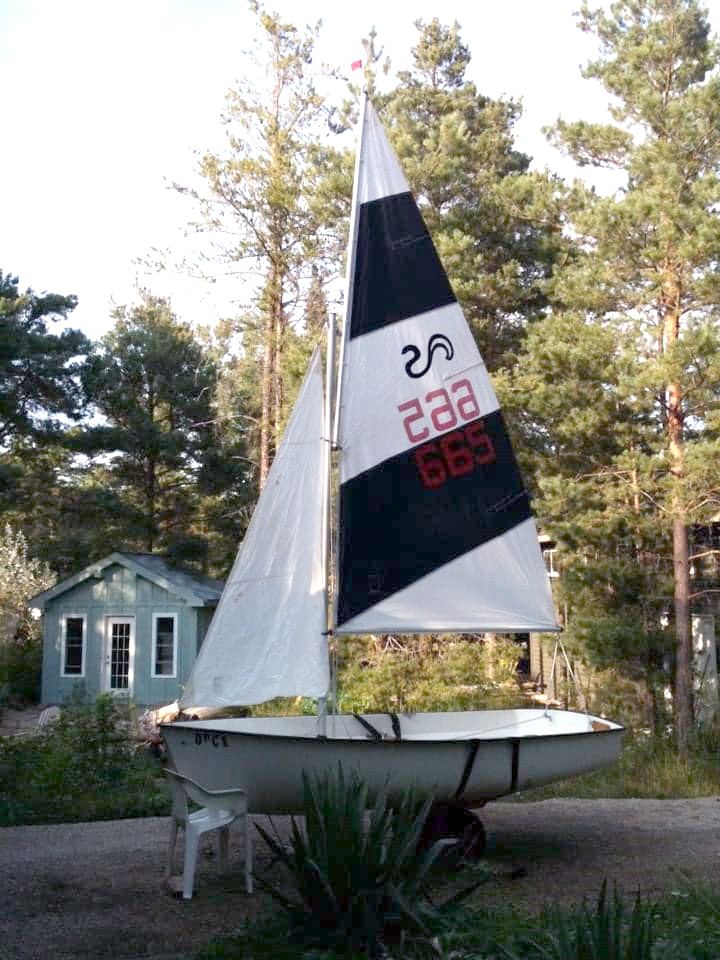
Skunk 11

Summary of boats built by Vandestadt and McGruer Limited:

- Spindrift 13 - 1965
- Skunk 11 - 1969
- Shrimp - 1972
- Siren 17 - 1974
- Sirius 20 - 1976
- Sirius 21 - 1977
- Sirius 22 - circa 1981
- Super Skunk - 1981
- Sirius 28 - 1982
- Sirius 26 - 1987

== See also ==
- List of sailboat designers and manufacturers
