= Skene Boats =

Sailboat builder

Skene Boats Limited
- Company type: Privately held company
- Industry: Boat building
- Founded: 1968
- Founder: Donald Skene
- Defunct: 1992
- Headquarters: Gloucester, Ontario, Canada
- Products: Sailboats

Skene Boats was a Canadian boat builder based in Gloucester, Ontario, now part of the city of Ottawa. The company specialized in the manufacture of fibreglass sailboats. It was founded in 1968 and went out business in 1992.

== History ==
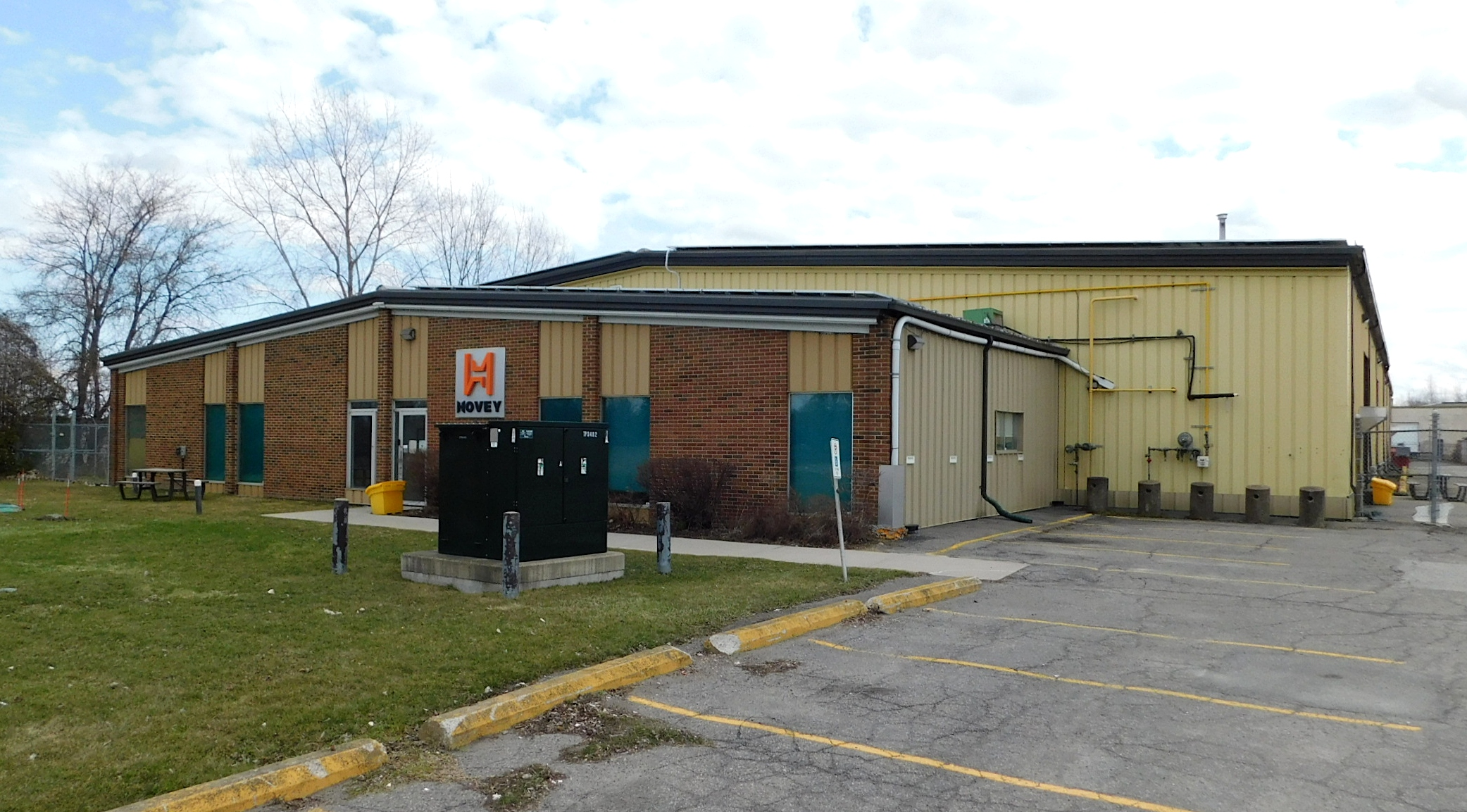
2793 Fenton Road as seen in 2022, formerly the home of Skene Boats.

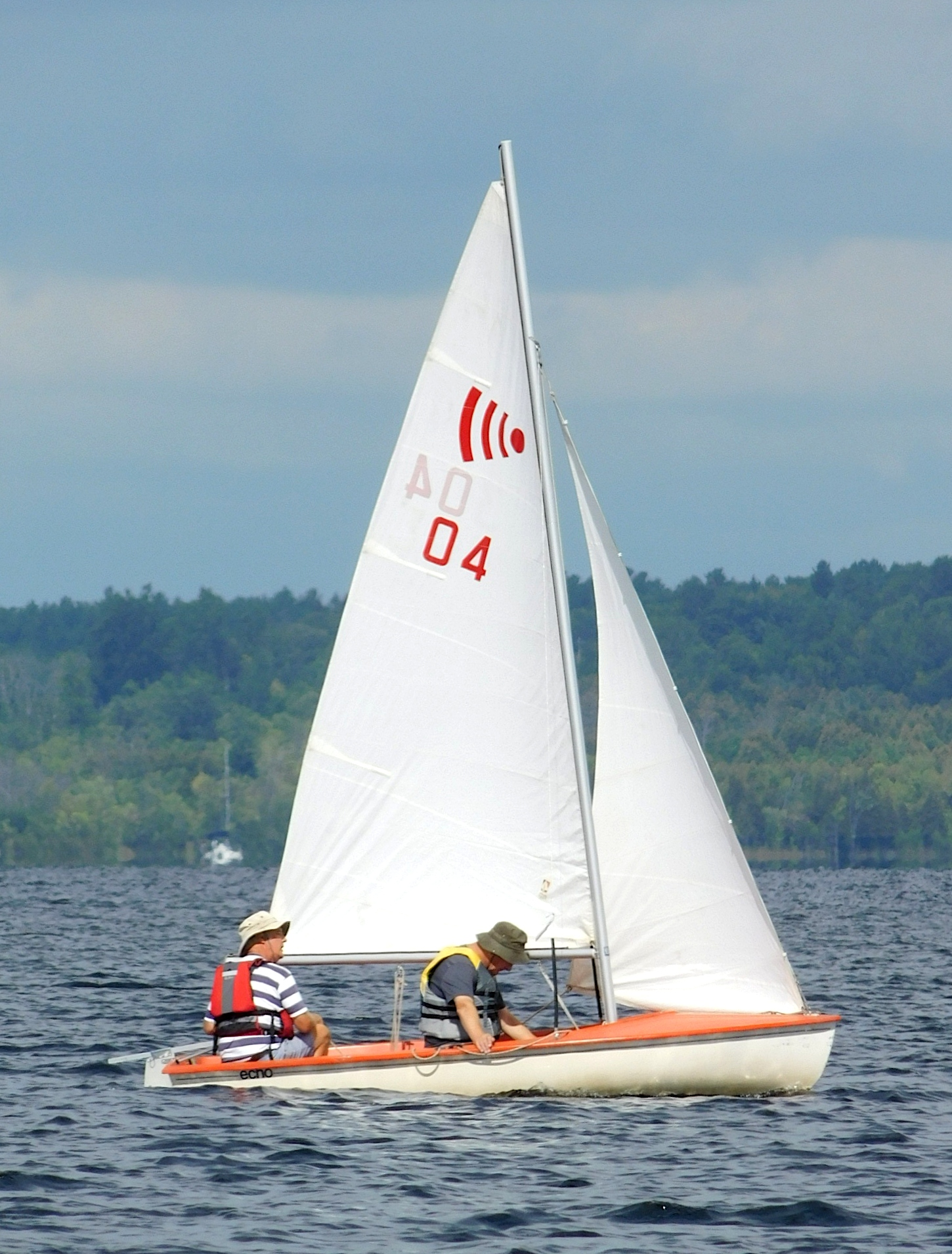
Echo 12

The company was founded by Donald Skene in 1968. Two years later, in 1970, he sold the company to F. Wallis White and George Carlyle. They sold the company to Carl Strike and his partners in 1979 and the company closed in 1992.

The business was located in a small industrial park at 2793 Fenton Road.

The company produced five different designs of small sailing dinghies, including the Phoenix 18 catamaran, Albacore one design racer and the Echo 12. The George Hinterhoeller-designed Cygnus 20 was produced as both a centreboard boat and a keelboat.

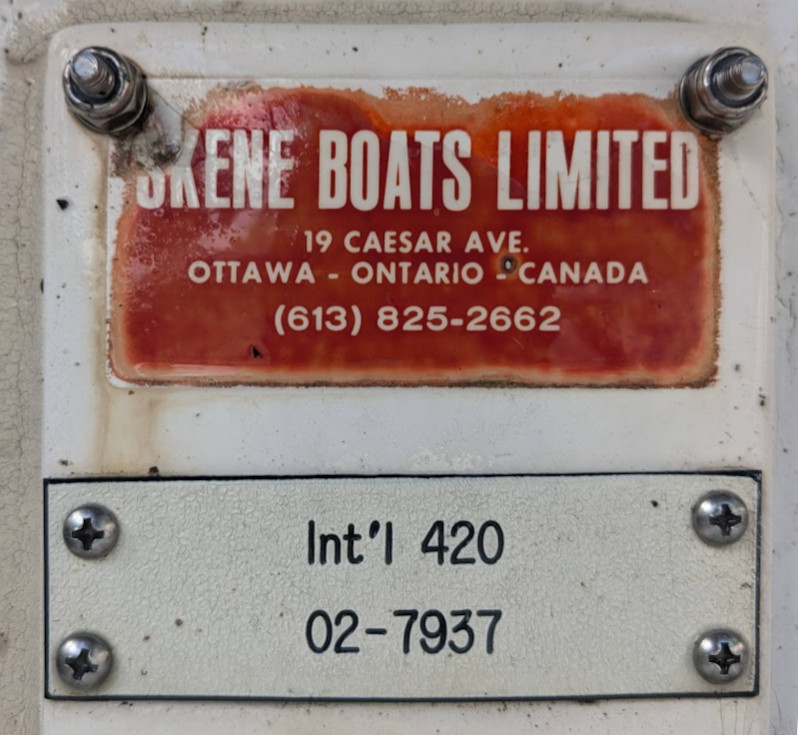
Sailboat nameplate for International 420

== Boats ==
Summary of boats built by Skene Boats:

- Albacore
- Cygnus 20
- Echo 12
- Phoenix 18
- International 420

== See also ==
- List of sailboat designers and manufacturers
