= Spindrift 13 =

Sailboat class

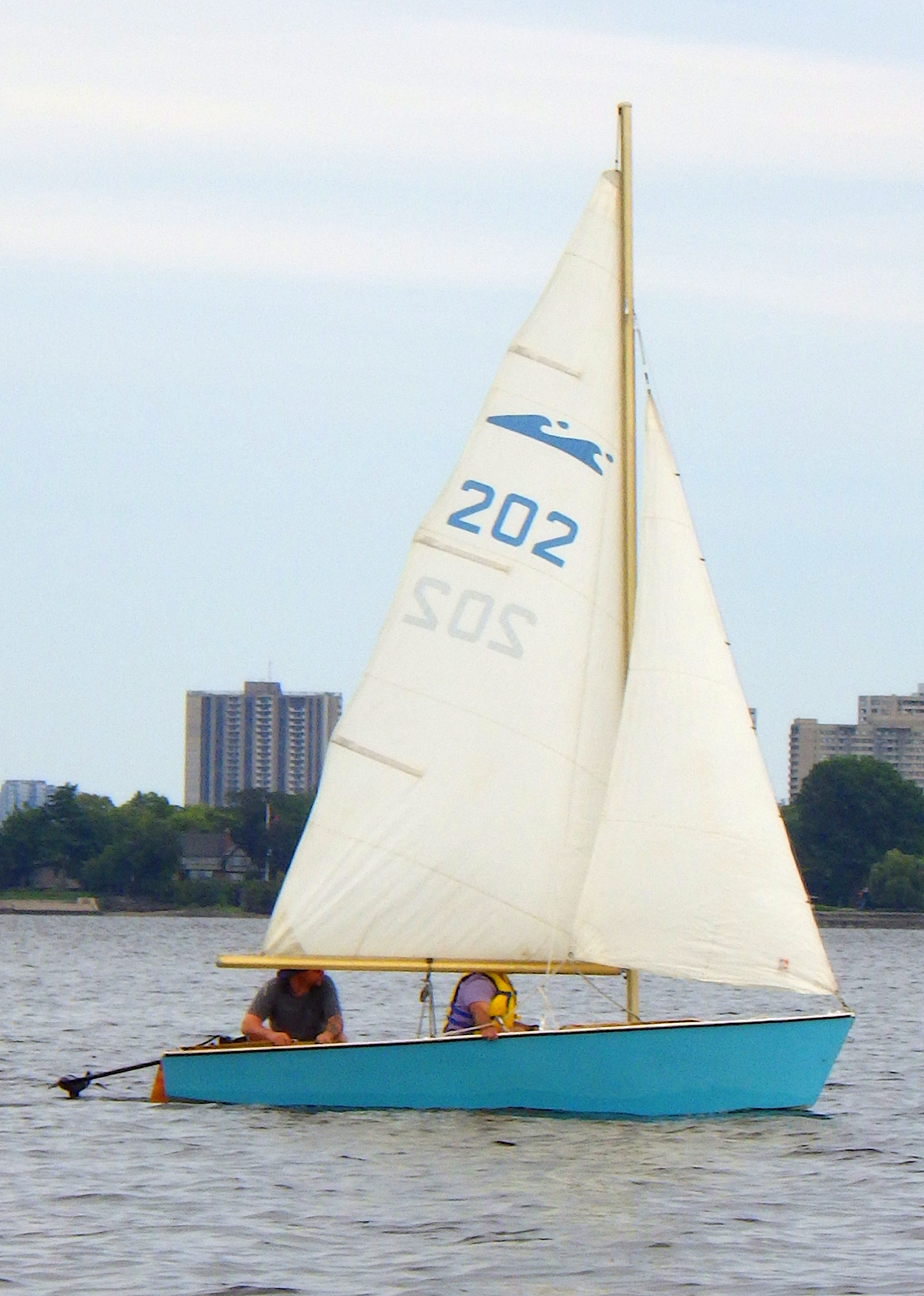

Development
- Designer: Hubert Vandestadt
- Location: Canada
- Year: 1965
- No. built: 800
- Builder: Vandestadt and McGruer Limited
- Role: Sailing dinghy
- Name: Spindrift 13

Boat
- Displacement: 205 lb (93 kg)
- Draft: 3.00 ft (0.91 m) with centreboard up

Hull
- Type: Monohull
- Construction: Fibreglass
- LOA: 13.33 ft (4.06 m)
- Beam: 5.18 ft (1.58 m)

Hull appendages
- Keel: centreboard
- Rudder: transom-mounted rudder

Rig
- Rig type: Bermuda rig

Sails
- Sailplan: Fractional rigged sloop
- Mainsail area: 68 sq ft (6.3 m^{2})
- Jib/genoa area: 32 sq ft (3.0 m^{2})
- Spinnaker area: 130 sq ft (12 m^{2})
- Total sail area: 100.00 sq ft (9.290 m^{2})

Racing
- D-PN: 103.6

The Spindrift 13 is a Canadian sailing dinghy that was designed by Hubert Vandestadt and first built in 1965.

== Production ==
The boat was produced as a kit and in completed form of fibreglass, plus could be built from scratch from wood.

The design was built by Vandestadt and McGruer Limited in Owen Sound, Ontario, Canada as its first product. There were 800 boats completed starting in 1965, but the company went out of business in 1987 and the boat is now out of production.

== Design ==
The Spindrift 13 is a recreational sailboat, with the manufactured boats built predominantly of fibreglass, with the deck made as a foam sandwich. It has a fractional sloop rig, a raked stem, a plumb transom, a transom-hung rudder controlled by a tiller and a retractable centreboard. Both the rudder and centreboard are "kick up" designs. For safety the design has fore and aft buoyancy tanks and a foam-filled mast. The boat displaces 205 lb (93 kg) and is equipped with a boom vang and jiffy reefing. A spinnaker of 130 sq ft (12 m^{2}) can be fitted.

The boat has a draft of 3.00 ft (0.91 m) with the centreboard extended and 0.33 ft (0.10 m) with it retracted, allowing beaching or ground transportation on a trailer or car roof rack.

The design has a capacity of four people, but is raced with a crew of two.

The design has a Portsmouth Yardstick sailing handicap of 103.6.

== See also ==
- List of sailing boat types
