= Blue Crab 11 =

Sailboat class

Development
- Designer: Harry R. Sindle
- Location: United States
- Year: 1971
- No. built: 900
- Builders: Lockley Newport Boats; Mobjack Manufacturing
- Role: Sailing dinghy
- Name: Blue Crab 11

Boat
- Displacement: 200 lb (91 kg)
- Draft: 2.75 ft (0.84 m), with daggerboard down

Hull
- Type: Monohull
- Construction: Fiberglass
- LOA: 11.08 ft (3.38 m)
- LWL: 10.25 ft (3.12 m)
- Beam: 5.17 ft (1.58 m)

Hull appendages
- Keel: daggerboard
- Rudder: transom-mounted rudder

Rig
- Rig type: Bermuda rig

Sails
- Sailplan: Fractional rigged sloop
- Mainsail area: 65.00 sq ft (6.039 m^{2})
- Jib/genoa area: 23.00 sq ft (2.137 m^{2})
- Total sail area: 88.00 sq ft (8.175 m^{2})

Racing
- D-PN: 110.8

The Blue Crab 11, also called the Gloucester 11, is an American utility dinghy that can be rowed, used as a motorboat or as a sailing dinghy. It was designed by Harry R. Sindle and first built in 1971. The design is named for the family of crustaceans.

== Production ==
The design was built by Lockley Newport Boats and Mobjack Manufacturing in the United States, but it is now out of production. Lockley Newport Boats was originally known as Newport Boats and later known as Gloucester Yachts. A total of 900 examples of then type were completed.

== Design ==
The Blue Crab 11 is a recreational sailboat, built predominantly of fiberglass. It has a fractional sloop rig, with a loose-footed mainsail and aluminum spars, a raked stem, a plumb transom, a transom-hung rudder controlled by a tiller and a retractable daggerboard. It displaces 200 lb (91 kg).

The boat has a draft of 2.75 ft (0.84 m) with the daggerboard extended and 0.25 ft (0.076 m) with it retracted, allowing beaching or ground transportation on a trailer or car roof rack.

The boat has a reinforced transom to allow the fitting of a small outboard motor.

For sailing the design is equipped with transom-mount mainsheet traveler and can be sailed by one person, although a crew of two is used for racing. When sailed three people may be carried and as a motorboat it has a capacity of five people.

The design has a Portsmouth Yardstick racing average handicap of 110.8.

== Operational history ==
In a 1994 review Richard Sherwood wrote, "Blue Crab is a beginner’s boat. It is dry and easily rigged, and it can be sailed by one person. For its size, it is a light boat and may be car-topped or trailered. Capacity is three adults. The transom is reinforced, so additional brackets are not required for an outboard. Blue Crab may be rowed; when not sailing, it has a capacity of five adults."

== See also ==
- List of sailing boat types

Similar boats

- Echo 12
- Puffer (dinghy)
- Shrimp (dinghy)
- Skunk 11
