= Rowlock =

Brace attaching an oar to the boat

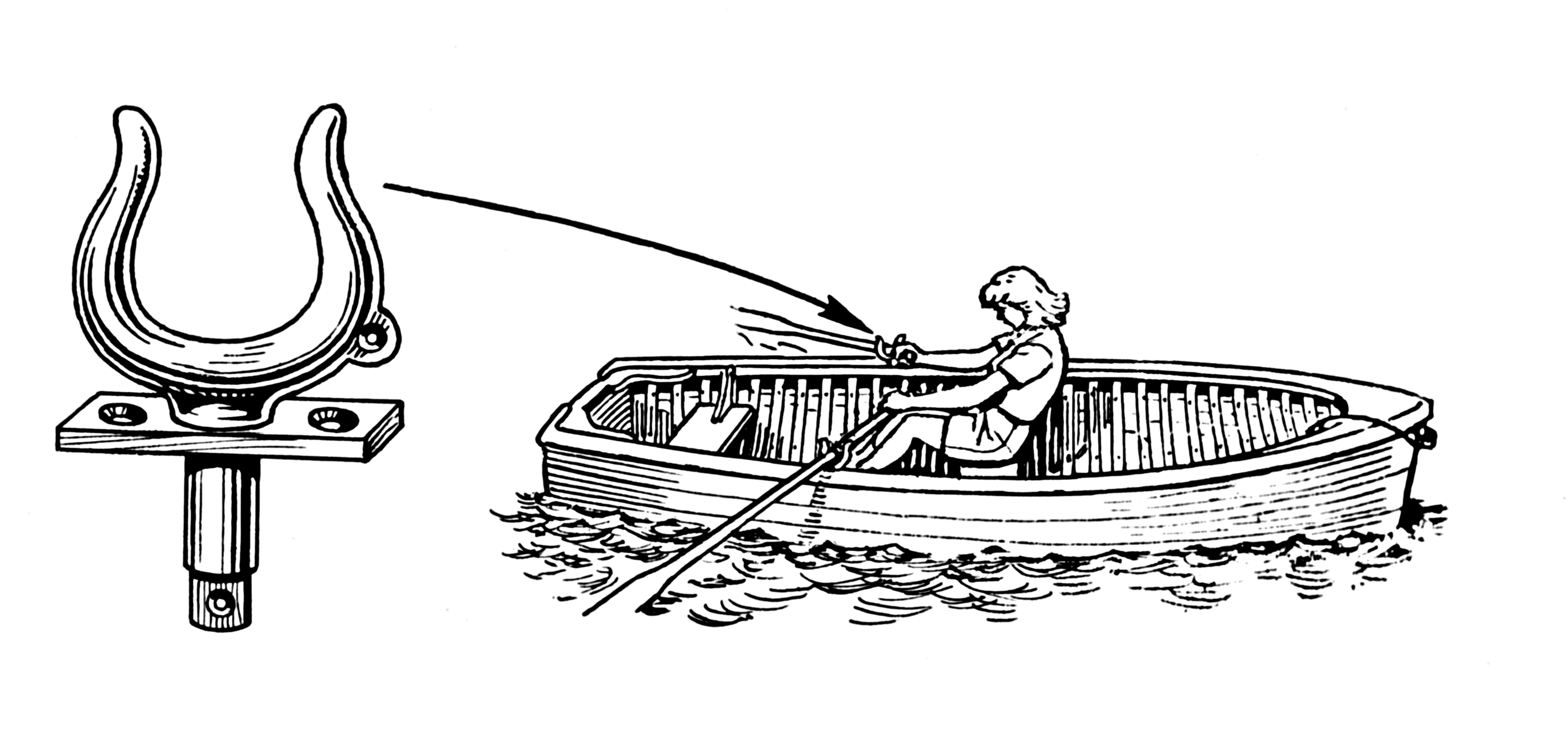
A rowlock on a rowing boat

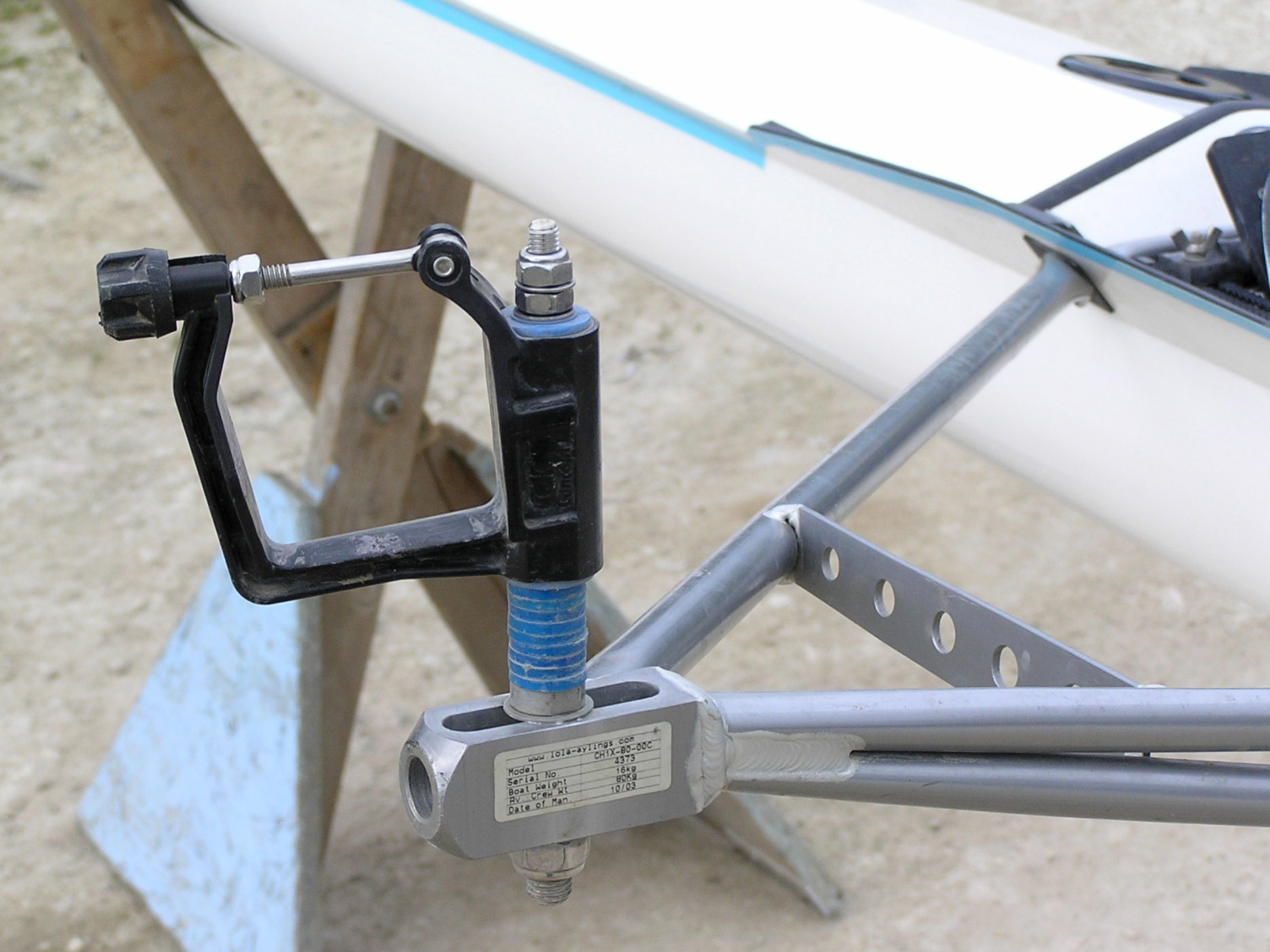
A rowlock, with a gate, on an outrigger used in sports rowing.

A rowlock (UK: /ˈrɒlək/), sometimes spur (due to the similarity in shape and size), oarlock (American English) or gate, is a brace that attaches an oar to a boat. When a boat is rowed, the rowlock acts as a fulcrum for the oar.

On ordinary rowing craft, the rowlocks are attached to the gunwales. In sport rowing, hulls are narrower, and the rowlocks are attached to outriggers (often just called "riggers"), which project from the boat and provide greater leverage. The rowlocks are normally U-shaped and attached to a vertical pin which allows the rowlock to pivot around the pin during the rowing stroke. In sport rowing they additionally have a locking mechanism (properly known as "the gate") across the top of the "U" to prevent the oar from unintentionally popping out of the rowlock.

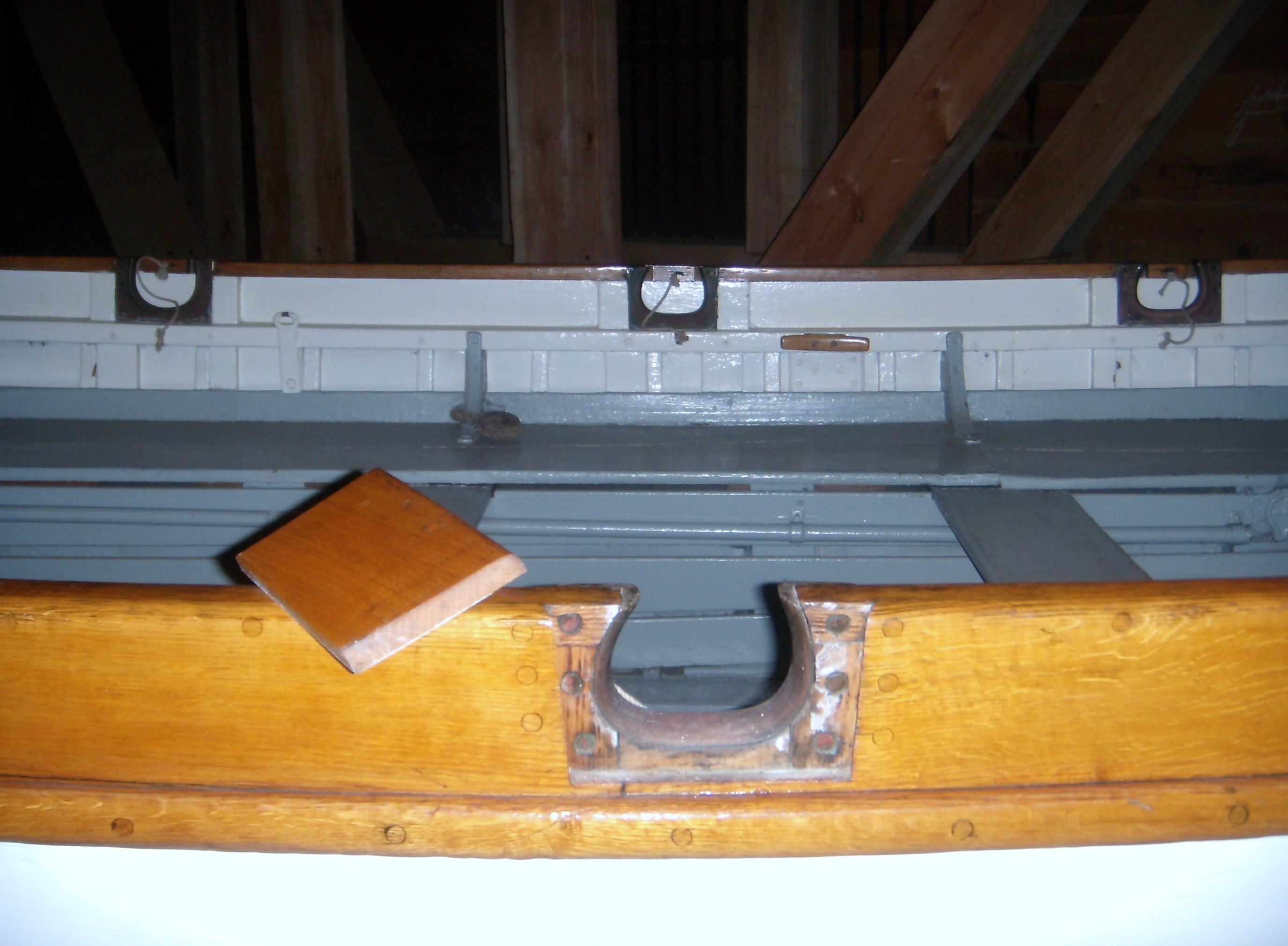
A rowlock cut into the top strake of a boat

In some, largely older, strict terminologies, a rowlock is a U-shaped cut-out in the top strake of a boat (usually the wash-strake). In older texts, the U-shaped metal fitting may be called an "oar crutch", a usage which is largely obsolete.

An alternative pivot point for oars are thole pins that the shaft of the oar nestled between. Single thole pins may be used when the oars have holes cut into the loom, which then sits over/around the thole pin or when the oar is attached to the thole pin by a grommet.

== Sport rowing ==
Oarlocks are critical technical pieces of equipment in sport rowing, holding the oar shaft and therefore the oar blade at the correct angle in the water to ensure optimum performance.

Originally brass or bronze and open (no gate), modern oarlocks are now precision made of injection moulded plastic to minimize play (slop) between the oar collar and the oarlock. The most recent sport racing oarlocks have a spring loaded feature to keep the oar collar firmly against the pin at all times.

== Heraldry ==
Hailuoto

Hankasalmi

coats of arms with rowlocks

In Norway, Fosnes Municipality, Radøy Municipality, and Tjøme Municipality all used rowlocks on their coats of arms. A rowlock is also used in the coat of arms of Hailuoto, Finland, to symbolise the maritime economy of the island municipality; the coat of arms is blazoned as "Azure a rowlock argent." A type of rowlock is also featured in the canting arms of Hankasalmi, alluding to the municipality's name (hankain = rowlock, salmi = strait).
