= Sun Odyssey 35 =

Sailboat class

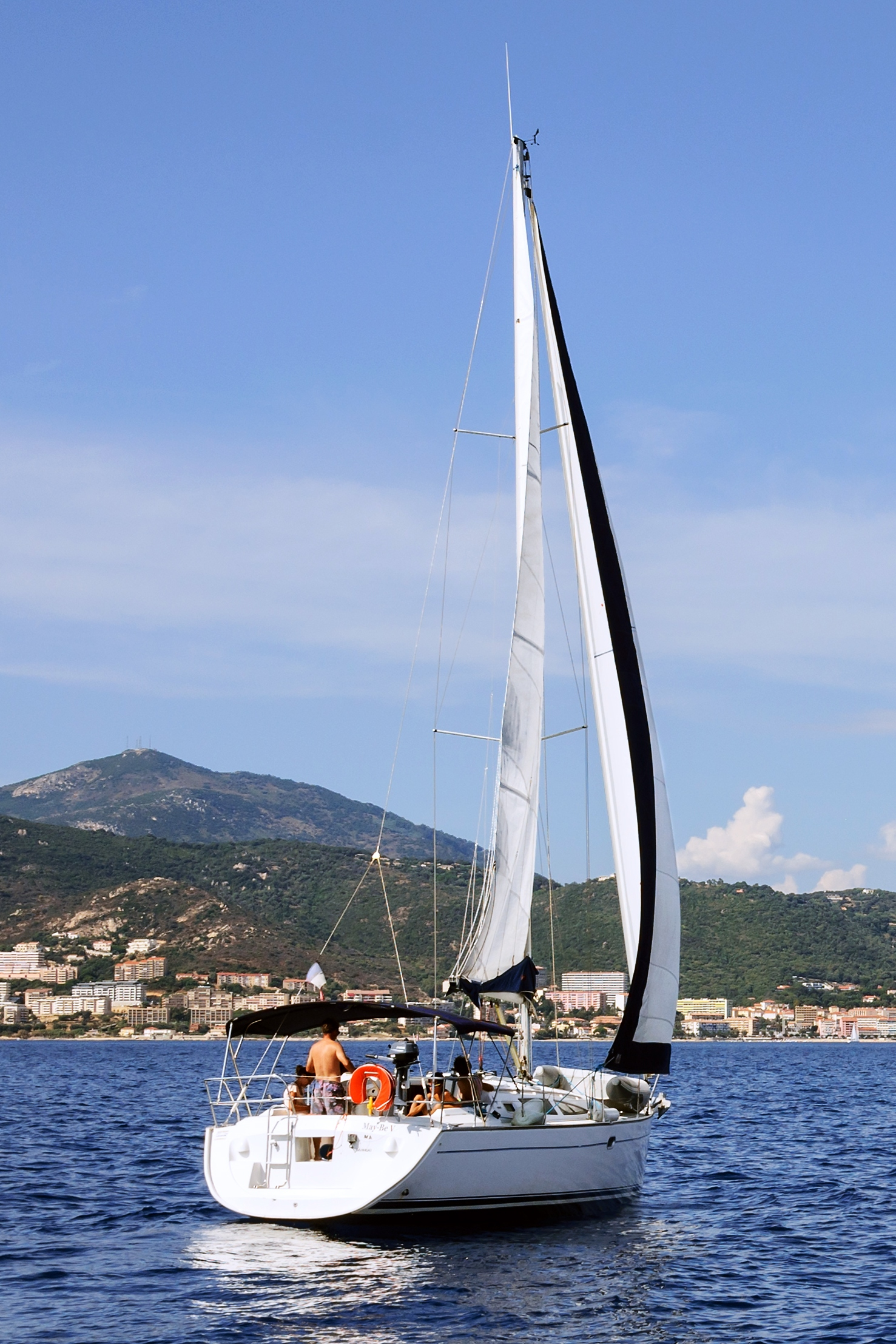

Development
- Designer: Marc Lombard; Eric Levet
- Location: France
- Year: 2003
- Builder: Jeanneau
- Role: Cruiser
- Name: Sun Odyssey 35

Boat
- Displacement: 11,464 lb (5,200 kg)
- Draft: 7.15 ft (2.18 m) with keel down

Hull
- Type: monohull
- Construction: fiberglass
- LOA: 35.00 ft (10.67 m)
- LWL: 31.92 ft (9.73 m)
- Beam: 11.42 ft (3.48 m)
- Engine: Volvo MD2030 diesel engine 29 hp (22 kW)

Hull appendages
- Keel: lifting keel
- Ballast: 3,285 lb (1,490 kg)
- Rudder: spade-type rudder

Rig
- Rig type: Bermuda rig
- I foretriangle height: 47.75 ft (14.55 m)
- J foretriangle base: 13.42 ft (4.09 m)
- P mainsail luff: 42.08 ft (12.83 m)
- E mainsail foot: 12.58 ft (3.83 m)

Sails
- Sailplan: fractional rigged sloop
- Mainsail area: 264.68 sq ft (24.590 m^{2})
- Jib/genoa area: 320.40 sq ft (29.766 m^{2})
- Total sail area: 585.09 sq ft (54.357 m^{2})

Racing
- PHRF: 108-132

The Sun Odyssey 35 is a French sailboat that was designed by Marc Lombard and Eric Levet as a cruiser and first built in 2003.

The design was developed into the Sun Fast 35 cruiser-racer in 2004.

== Production ==
The design was built by Jeanneau in France, starting in 2003, but it is now out of production.

== Design ==
The Sun Odyssey 35 is a recreational keelboat, built predominantly of fiberglass. It has a fractional sloop rig, a raked stem, a walk-through reverse transom with a swimming platform, an internally mounted spade-type rudder controlled by a wheel and a retractable lifting keel. The version for the European market has twin rudders. It displaces 11,464 lb (5,200 kg) and carries 3,285 lb (1,490 kg) of ballast.

The boat has a draft of 7.15 ft (2.18 m) with the keel extended and 2.95 ft (0.90 m) with it retracted, allowing operation in shallow water.

The boat is fitted with a Swedish Volvo MD2030 diesel engine of 29 hp (22 kW) for docking and maneuvering. The fuel tank holds 35 U.S. gallons (130 L; 29 imp gal) and the fresh water tank has a capacity of 81 U.S. gallons (310 L; 67 imp gal).

The design has a hull speed of 7.57 kn (14.02 km/h) and a PHRF handicap of 108 to 129 keel down and 123 to 132 keel up.

== Operational history ==
A 2003 review in Sail magazine reported, "many boats with 'contemporary' styling, particularly those from Europe, tend to look amorphous, so it's refreshing to see a new design with truly clean and elegant lines. Jeanneau's latest addition to its long-lived Sun Odyssey line, drawn by Marc Lombard and Eric Levet, is just such a boat."

== See also ==
- List of sailing boat types
