= Sun Fast 35 =

Sailboat class

Development
- Designer: Marc Lombard
- Location: France
- Year: 2004
- Builder: Jeanneau
- Role: Cruiser-Racer
- Name: Sun Fast 35

Boat
- Displacement: 12,202 lb (5,535 kg)
- Draft: 7.05 ft (2.15 m)

Hull
- Type: monohull
- Construction: fiberglass
- LOA: 35.27 ft (10.75 m)
- LWL: 31.95 ft (9.74 m)
- Beam: 11.45 ft (3.49 m)
- Engine: Yanmar 40 hp (30 kW) diesel engine

Hull appendages
- Keel: fin keel
- Ballast: 3,219 lb (1,460 kg)
- Rudder: spade-type rudder with weighted bulb

Rig
- Rig type: Bermuda rig
- I foretriangle height: 45.77 ft (13.95 m)
- J foretriangle base: 13.29 ft (4.05 m)
- P mainsail luff: 42.16 ft (12.85 m)
- E mainsail foot: 13.12 ft (4.00 m)

Sails
- Sailplan: fractional rigged sloop
- Mainsail area: 276.57 sq ft (25.694 m^{2})
- Jib/genoa area: 304.14 sq ft (28.256 m^{2})
- Total sail area: 580.71 sq ft (53.950 m^{2})

Racing
- PHRF: 93-114

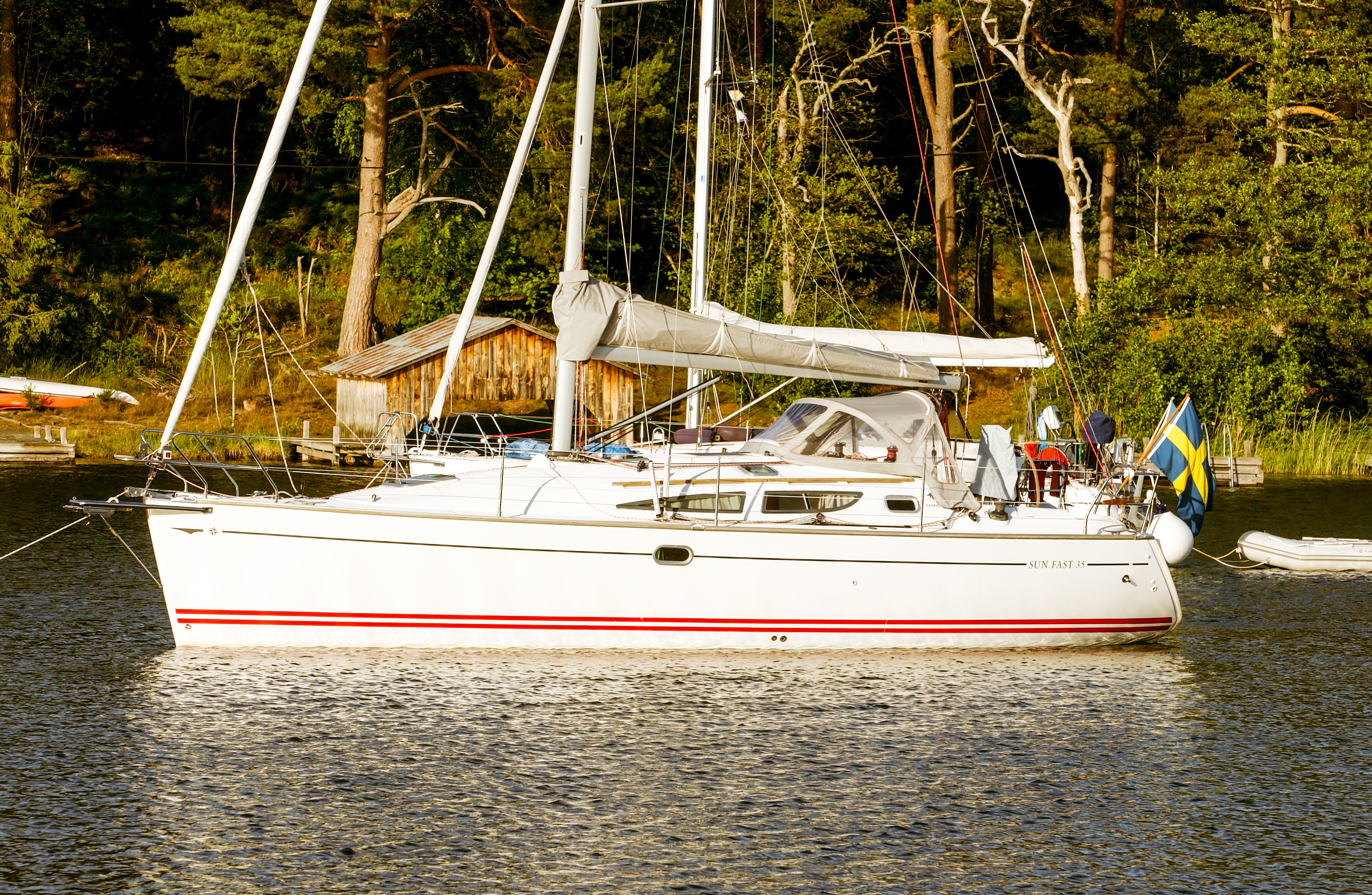
Swedish flagged Jeanneau sun fast 35 anchored in Arholma.

The Sun Fast 35 is a French sailboat that was designed by Marc Lombard as a cruiser-racer and first built in 2004.

The design is a development of the 2003 Sun Odyssey 35 cruiser.

== Production ==
The design was built by Jeanneau in France, starting in 2004, with more than 300 boats built in the first year alone. It is now out of production.

== Design ==
The Sun Fast 35 is a recreational keelboat, built predominantly of fiberglass, with wood trim. It has a fractional sloop rig with a keel-stepped aluminum mast and discontinuous Dyform rigging. The hull has a slightly raked stem, a walk-through reverse transom, an internally mounted spade-type rudder with a weight bulb, controlled by a tiller and a fixed fin keel. It displaces 12,202 lb (5,535 kg) and carries 3,219 lb (1,460 kg) of ballast.

The boat has a draft of 7.05 ft (2.15 m) with the standard keel.

The boat is fitted with a Japanese Yanmar diesel engine of 40 hp (30 kW) for docking and maneuvering. The fuel tank holds 34 U.S. gallons (130 L; 28 imp gal) and the fresh water tank has a capacity of 82 U.S. gallons (310 L; 68 imp gal).

The design has sleeping accommodation for four or six people, with a double "V"-berth in the bow cabin, an U-shaped settee and a straight settee in the main cabin and an aft cabin with a double berth on the starboard side or an optional second aft cabin to port. The galley is located on the starboard side at the companionway ladder. The galley is L-shaped and is equipped with a stove, an ice box and a double sink. A navigation station is opposite the galley, on the port side. The head is located opposite the galley, aft, on the port side.

The design has a hull speed of 7.57 kn (14.02 km/h) and a PHRF handicap of 93 to 114.

== Operational history ==
The boat won recognition, being named the 2005 European boat of the year by Yacht magazine, Germany; Boat of the Year at the Oslo Boat Show and first place in Sailing Magazine's Top Ten Boats.

The boat was at one time supported by a class club that organized racing events, the Sun Fast Association.

In a 2005 review in Sailing World, Tom Bessinger wrote, "In the past, Jeanneau has been successful in taking popular Sun Odyssey models, such as their 37-footer, and turbo-charging them with taller rigs and deeper keels, as well as racing hardware, so when they saw how popular the 35 was, they decided to do the same with it. The Sun Fast 35 uses the same hull, deck, and interior layout as the Sun Odyssey 35, and offers the same large, comfortable interior. Upgrades include a two-foot taller [52' 8"], keel-stepped aluminum mast on which the wire standing rigging is replaced with discontinuous Dyform rod. The draft has been increased to 7 feet from 6, and the rudder has been lengthened as well. The traveler has been relocated from the cabin top to the cockpit, and an instrument cluster now resides just forward of the sliding hatch over the companionway."

In a 2004 Yachting World review, Matthew Sheahan wrote, "the Jeanneau Sun Fast 35 is a performance boat where having the controls close to hand is the whole point ... this is a great boat under sail. She's balanced, well mannered and gets a move on with ease. Her sail proportions feel spot on for a boat of this size."

== See also ==
- List of sailing boat types
