= Siraya =

Siraya may refer to:

- Siraya people, of Taiwan
- Siraya language, their Austronesian language, now extinct
- Siraya-class offshore patrol vessel, of the Coast Guard Administration

== See also ==
- Makatao people, a related people
