= Yu Ming-shi =

Taiwanese politician

- 尤明錫

Administrative Deputy Minister of Coast Guard Administration of the Republic of China
- Minister: Wang Jinn-wang

Yu Ming-shi (Chinese: 尤明錫; pinyin: Yóu Míngxī) is a Taiwanese politician. He currently serves as the Administrative Deputy Minister of the Coast Guard Administration of the Executive Yuan.

== CGA Deputy Ministry ==
=== Mainland China visit ===
Yu visited Mainland China in September 2010 with a delegation of government officials and business leaders. He met with Chen Yunlin, the President of the Association for Relations Across the Taiwan Straits.

== See also ==
- Coast Guard Administration (Taiwan)
- Executive Yuan
