= Cheng Chang-hsiung =

Taiwanese politician

- 鄭樟雄

Administrative Deputy Minister of the Coast Guard Administration of the Republic of China
- Minister: Wang Jinn-wang

Cheng Chang-hsiung (traditional Chinese: 鄭樟雄; simplified Chinese: 郑樟雄; pinyin: Zhèng Zhāngxióng) is a Taiwanese politician. He currently serves as the Administrative Deputy Minister of the Coast Guard Administration of the Executive Yuan.

== CGA Deputy Ministry ==
=== Cross-strait joint sea rescue exercise ===
In September 2010, Yu, along with Xu Zuyuan, Vice Minister of Transport of the PRC, joint commanded the first joint sea rescue exercise between Taiwan and Mainland China. The exercise lasted for more than an hour and was held on 6 km^{2} of water near the narrow passage between Kinmen and Xiamen.
