= Wang Ginn-wang =

Taiwanese politician

- 王進旺
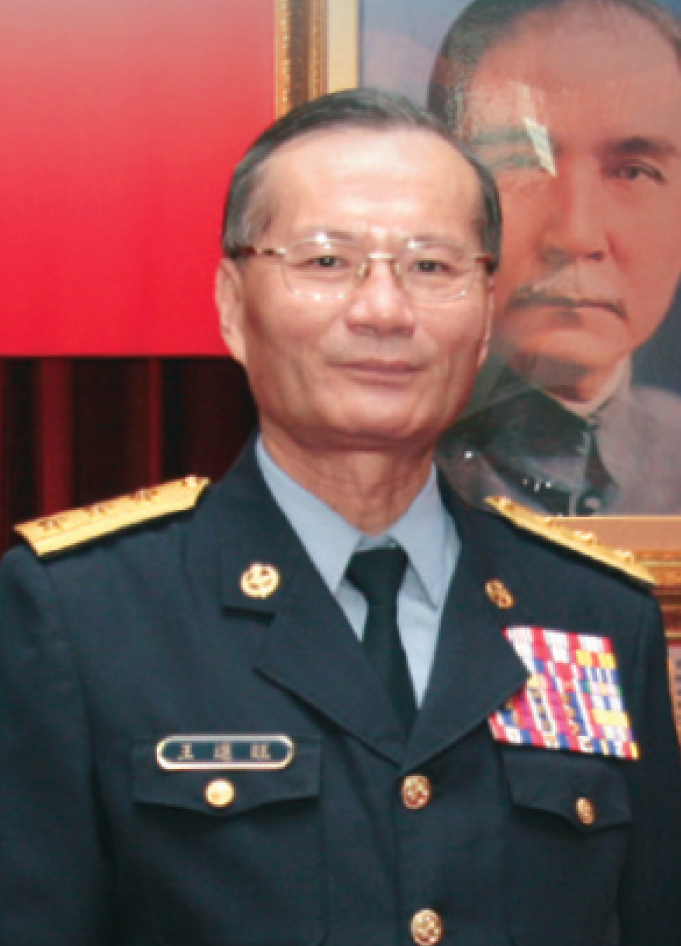

Minister of the Coast Guard Administration of the Republic of China
- In office 25 January 2006 – 7 December 2014
- Deputy: Yu Ming-shi, Wang Chung-yi, Cheng Chang-hsiung
- Preceded by: Shi Hwei-yow
- Succeeded by: Wang Chung-yi

Deputy Director-General of the National Security Bureau of the Republic of China
- In office 2003–2006
- Director-General: Tsai Chao-ming; Hsueh Shih-ming
- Preceded by: Shi Hwei-yow

Director-General of the National Police Agency of the Republic of China
- In office 11 August 2000 – 30 June 2003
- Preceded by: Ting Yuan-chin
- Succeeded by: Chang Si-liang

Personal details
- Born: 19 October 1947 (age 78) Tainan, Taiwan, China
- Education: Central Police University (BA); National Taipei University (MA)

Wang Ginn-wang or Wang Jinn-wang (Chinese: 王進旺; pinyin: Wáng Jìnwàng; born 14 October 1947) is a Taiwanese politician. He was the Minister of the Coast Guard Administration from 2006 to 2014.

== Education ==
After graduating from National Pungtung Teachers College (now National Pingtung University), Wang graduated from Central Police University with a Bachelor of Arts (B.A.) in police administration in 1973. He earned a Master of Arts (M.A.) in criminology from National Taipei University in 2006.

== ROC Coast Guard Administration Ministry ==
=== Clash between Taiwanese boats and Japan Coast Guard ===
On 25 September 2012, when dozens of fishing boats entered Japanese territorial water en route to the Diaoyutai Islands, Japan Coast Guard patrol boats fired water cannon at the fishing boats. Wang of the Coast Guard Administration (CGA) ships responded: "We do not rule out using force to fight back if Japan were to do so".

=== Diaoyutai Islands fishery water ===
After signing the historic fishery agreement between ROC and Japan on 10 April 2013, Wang said that any fishing boat entering the Senkaku Islands (or from Mandarin Chinese, Diaoyutai Islands) water within 12 nautical miles from outside Taiwan will be expelled, including the Japanese fishing boats. This triggered anger from Mainland China.

== Awards ==
- Taiwan: Order of Propitious Clouds with Grand Cordon (2015)
