= Wang Chung-yi =

Taiwanese politician (born 1952)

- 王崇儀

Minister of Coast Guard
- In office 8 December 2014 – 20 May 2016
- Prime Minister: Mao Chi-kuo; Chang San-cheng
- Preceded by: Wang Ginn-wang
- Succeeded by: Lee Chung-wei

Personal details
- Born: 21 May 1952 (age 74) Nantou County, Taiwan
- Spouse: Huang Chao-shun
- Children: 2 sons Chen Ching-hui (stepdaughter)
- Relatives: Huang Tzuen-chiou (father-in-law)
- Education: National Chung Hsing University (LLB); National Sun Yat-sen University (MA)

Wang Chung-yi (Chinese: 王崇儀; pinyin: Wáng Chóngyí; born 21 May 1952) is a Taiwanese politician who served as the Minister of the Coast Guard Administration of the Executive Yuan from 8 December 2014 until 20 May 2016. Having previous serving as its deputy minister from September 2008 to December 2014.

== Education ==
Wang graduated from National Chung Hsing University in 1974 with a Bachelor of Laws (LL.B.) and earned a master's degree from the College of Management of National Sun Yat-sen University.

== Personal life ==
Wang had two sons through his first marriage. His second wife is Huang Chao-shun, who was the members of the 2nd through 9th Legislative Yuan. Through his marriage with Huang, he is the son-in-law of the former President of the Control Yuan, Huang Tzuen-chiou, as well as the stepfather of Chen Ching-hui, who is the member of the 11th Legislative Yuan representing Kuomintang's party-list.
