= Siraya-class patrol vessel =

Chiayi-class patrol vessel
- First ship Siraya

Class overview
- Builders: CSBC Corporation, Taiwan
- Operators: Coast Guard Administration
- Built: 2026-Present
- Planned: 6
- Completed: 1
- Active: 1

General characteristics
- Type: Large Pelagic Patrol Vessel
- Displacement: 5,200 tons
- Length: 120m
- Beam: 16.5m
- Speed: 24 knots
- Range: 15,000 nautical miles
- Armament: 1 X NCSIST 2.75in rockets remote weapon station, 2 X 20mm cannon remote weapon station, 3 X water cannons

The Siraya class is a class of Taiwanese offshore patrol vessels operated by the Coast Guard Administration. The first ship of a planned six in the class was launched in 2025.

== History ==
Planning for the Siraya class began in 2022 under the Tsai Ing-wen administration, particular consideration was given to the need to be able to operate in icy North Pacific waters. Siraya, the first ship in the class, was launched in November 2025 at CSBC Corporation, Taiwan's shipyard in Kaohsiung. Its launch was attended by President William Lai. The project has a NT$11.7 billion budget.

== Vessels ==
- Siraya, launched 2025

== Design ==
The ships are classified by the Taiwanese government as high-latitude oceanic patrol vessels. The ships have a steel hull and a displacement of 5,000 tons.

== Naming ==
The vessels are named after Taiwanese indigenous groups. Siraya is named after the Siraya people. They are the first vessels in Taiwanese service to feature indigenous names.

== See also ==
- Fishing industry in Taiwan
