= Coast Guard Administration (Taiwan) =

Coast guard of Taiwan

Coast Guard Administration 海洋委員會海巡署 Hǎixún Shǔ (Mandarin) Hái-sûn Sú (Taiwanese Hokkien) Hói-sùn Su (Hakka)
- Racing stripe

- Flag
- Common name: ROC Coast Guard
- Abbreviation: CGA

Agency overview
- Formed: February 1, 2000

Jurisdictional structure
- National agency (Operations jurisdiction): Taiwan
- Operations jurisdiction: Taiwan
- Legal jurisdiction: Taiwanese and international waters
- Constituting instrument: The Coast Guard Act
- Specialist jurisdiction: Coastal patrol, marine border protection, marine search and rescue

Operational structure
- Headquarters: Wenshan, Taipei
- Agency executives: President Lai Ching-te, Commander-in-Chief; Chang Chung-Lung, Director-General
- Parent agency: Ocean Affairs Council

Website
- www.cga.gov.tw

The Coast Guard Administration of the Ocean Affairs Council (CGA), also operating as the ROC Coast Guard, is charged with maintaining law and order; protecting the resources of the territorial waters of the Republic of China (Taiwan), which surround Taiwan, Penghu, Kinmen, Matsu Islands, Green Island, Orchid Island, Pratas Island (Tungsha/Dongsha), and Nansha Islands; as well as providing a first line of defense along coastal areas against smugglers and illegal immigrants. The CGA is considered a civilian law enforcement agency under the administration of the Ocean Affairs Council of the Executive Yuan, though during emergencies it may be incorporated as part of the Republic of China Armed Forces.

== Organization ==
The Coast Guard Administration is headed by one minister and three deputy ministers. The CGA includes eight departments, one office and five task forces, as well as a Maritime Patrol Directorate General and a Coastal Patrol Directorate General. Its jurisdiction covers the waters surrounding Kinmen, Matsu, Penghu, and the main island of Taiwan to ensure proper protection of the 1,819.8 kilometers coastline and 540,000 square kilometers of "Blue Territory," which is 15 times larger than the island of Taiwan.

The Maritime Patrol Directorate General is responsible for all maritime patrols and operations at sea. The directorate consists of 16 Offshore Flotillas as well as the Northern, Southern, Central, and Eastern Flotilla Sectors.

The Coastal Patrol Directorate General is responsible for land based operations, primarily the patrolling of harbors, beaches and other coastal areas, and includes the Northern, Southern, Central, and Eastern Coastal Patrol Offices. There are several mobile investigative groups subordinated to four corresponding areas of responsibility of the Coastal Patrol Directorate General. All mobile investigative groups of the Coast Guard Administration are tasked to perform intelligence-gathering mission of State Security. While executing such intelligence-gathering function, The Coast Guard Administration is subjected to the supervisory and coordination from the National Security Bureau.

=== Special Task Unit ===
CGA STU

The Special Task Unit is an elite special forces unit of the CGA similar to the Military Police Special Services Company or the National Police Agency's Thunder Squad. During the 36th annual Han Kuang exercises they participated alongside special operations units from other branches in anti-decapitation drills.

=== Auxiliaries ===
The CGA has civilian coastal patrol volunteers which assist it. Volunteers provide assistance in search and rescue, border security, and marine debris removal. The number of auxiliaries has grown from 186 to a projected 6,000.

== Scope ==
Article two of the Coast Guard Law splits the responsibilities of the CGA into three zones, their core area (Shoreline to the end of the Exclusive Economic Zone), Waters temporarily or tentatively within the area of law enforcement, and International waters fisheries patrol.

The "core area" includes all land within 500 meters of the high tide line, Territorial waters (extending 12 nm from shoreline), the Contiguous zone (extending 24 nm from shore), and the Exclusive Economic Zone (extending 200 nm from shore). "Waters temporarily or tentatively within the area of law enforcement" are waters within the Exclusive Economic Zone (EEZ) were Taiwanese EEZs overlap with those of neighboring nations "where negotiations for delimitation have not yet reached a consensus."

The CGA conducts fisheries patrols in international waters, particularly the north and midwest Pacific Ocean.

== History ==
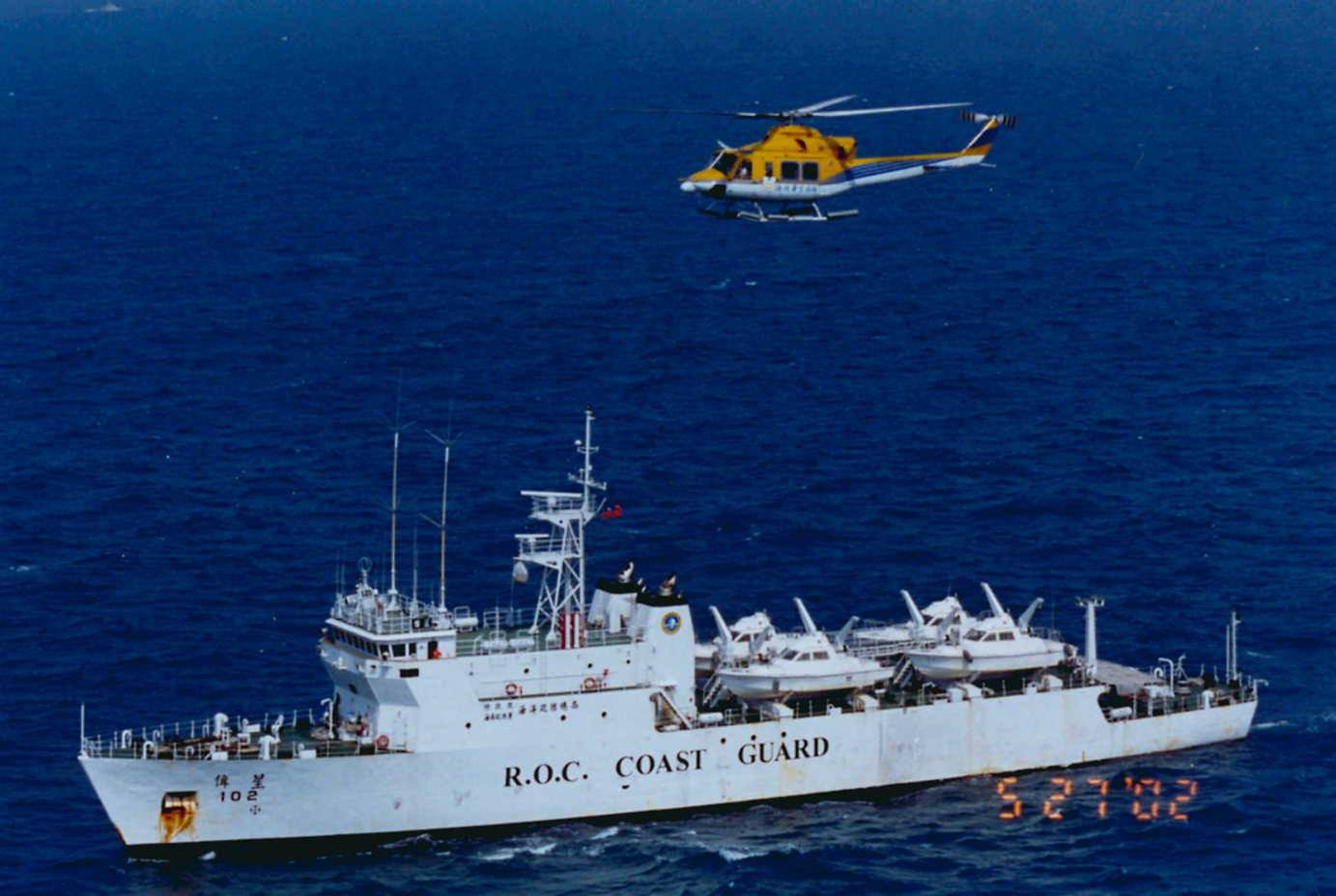
Wei Hsing (CG102), a 1,800-ton patrol vessel built for Coast Guard Administration

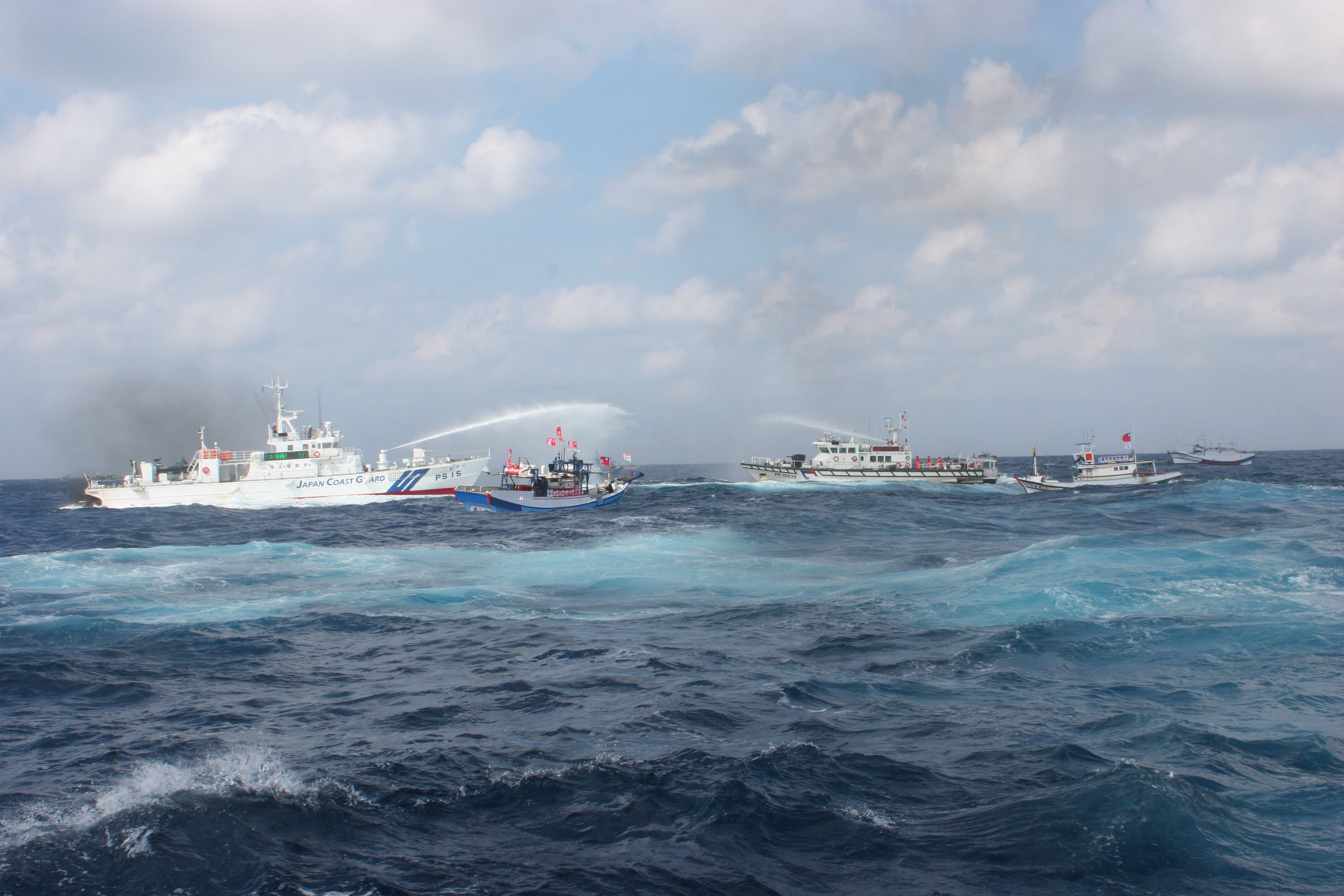
Water cannons in use by Japan Coast Guard and Coast Guard Administration (Taiwan) during a territorial dispute near the Senkaku Islands in 2012

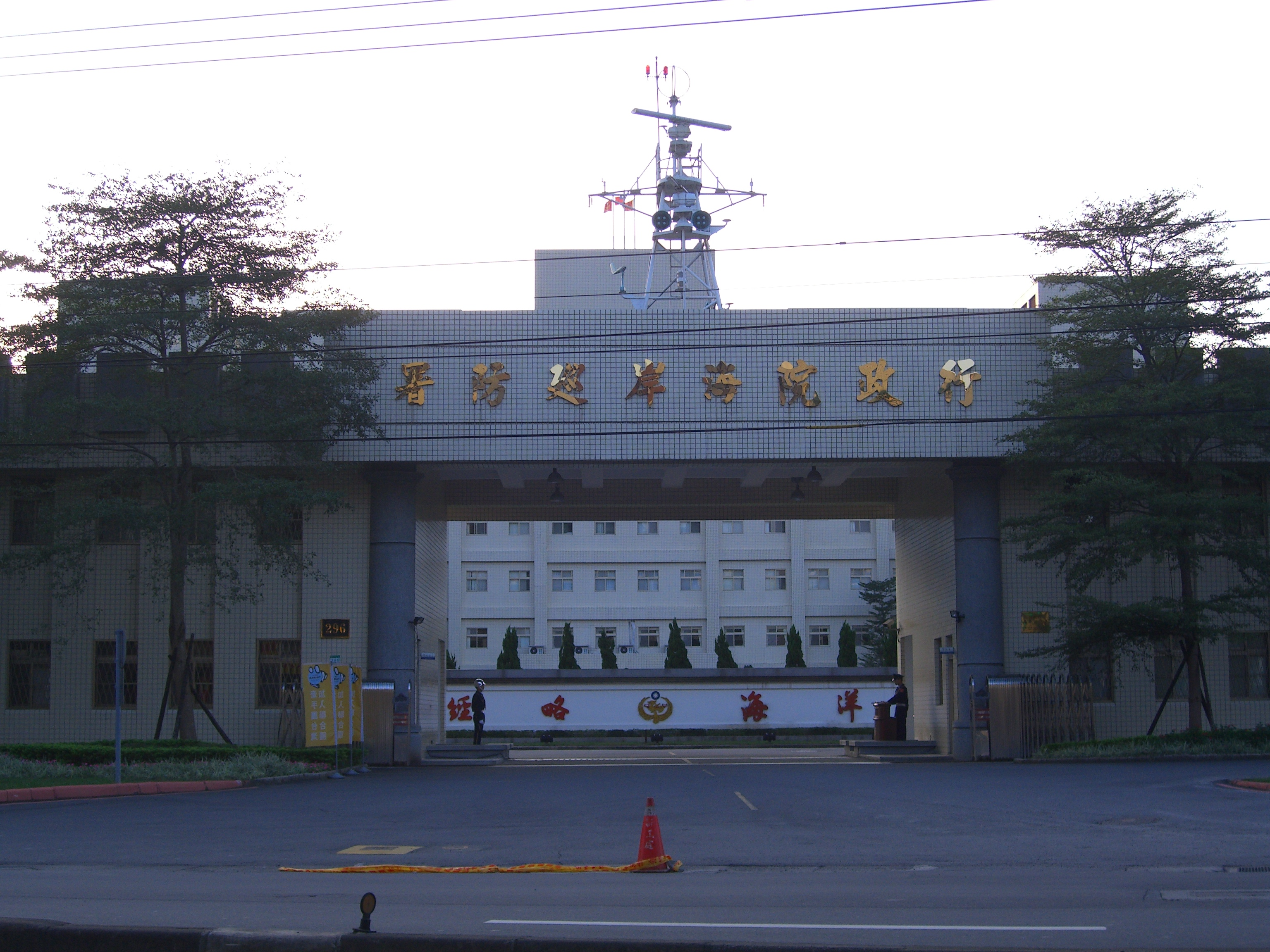
Coast Guard Administration building.

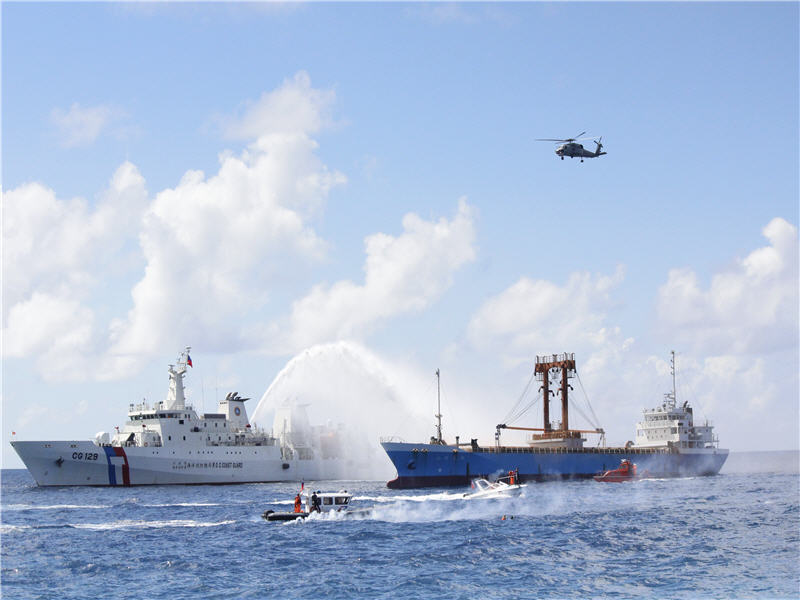
CGA Cutter engaged in an inter-agency counter-hybrid warfare exercise

The CGA was established on 1 February 2000, combining the Coast Guard Command (formerly under the Ministry of Defense), the Marine Police Bureau (formerly under the National Police Administration, Ministry of Interior), and several cutters from the Taiwan Directorate General of Customs, Ministry of Finance. The CGA formally unifies coastal and maritime law enforcement agencies.

It has seen a great deal of action for a young agency, participating in numerous search and rescue and anti-smuggling operations. The Coast Guard Administration was also recently involved in escorting Taiwanese fishing boats into waters disputed with Japan claimed by both sides as part of their exclusive economic zones.

In the late 2010s, China escalated to grey-zone actions against Taiwan in an attempt to achieve unification with the self-governing island. The Coast Guard Administration had to expand rapidly to meet the rising grey-zone challenge. China's grey-zone operations against Taiwan in the maritime domain are meant to establish presence while maintaining plausible deniability.

In May 2019 the CGA detained two Chinese fishing vessels for illegally fishing inside Taiwan's territorial waters. One vessel was 0.4 nautical miles off Taiwanese shores while the other was 2.1 nautical miles offshore.

In May 2019 the CGA rescued six fishermen aboard a burning boat nineteen miles offshore. Five fisherman were picked up by cutter while the most seriously injured was airlifted to hospital by helicopter. All fishermen survived the ordeal although three required hospitalization.

As of 2019 the CGA planned to construct a total of 141 ships, including four 4000-tonne, six 1000-tonne, 12 600-tonne, 17 100-tonne, 52 35-tonne patrol ships and 50 coastal multi-purposed ships, by 2027.

On March 1, 2020, three coast guard cutters clearing illegal fishing nets off Little Kinmen island were attacked by Chinese fishing boats which had to be repelled with warning shots from a shotgun.

On March 16, 2020, the patrol boats CP-1022 and CP-2006 of the 9th Offshore Flotilla based on Kinmen were attacked by ten Chinese speedboats. They had been assisting a Kinmen County Government Fisheries Research Institute patrol boat in clearing fishing nets illegally left in Taiwanese waters by Chinese fishermen when they came under attack from the men in speedboats throwing rocks and bottles. During the incident CP-1022 was rammed at speed and lost the function of two of their three engines and its hull was damaged. The CGA responded to the attack using less lethal means including stun grenades and bean bag rounds which caused the attacking boats to retreat.

In July 2020 the CGA arrested all 18 crew members of a Chinese fishing vessel caught fishing illegally in Taiwanese waters. The interdiction followed an increase in illegal fishing in Taiwanese waters by Chinese fishing vessels.

Between January and July 2020 the CGA chased 2,988 Chinese sand dredging vessels out of Taiwanese waters. In July 2020 the CGA seized a dredging vessel and arrested its eight crew as a warning to the rest.

In August 2020 the CGA detained a small Chinese oil tanker which had illegally entered Taiwan's waters. The oil tanker was discovered during enhanced COVID-19 pandemic biosecurity patrols.

In May 2021 the CGA detained a Chinese offshore supply vessel and its 12 crew. The vessel was caught trespassing in Taiwanese waters near Penghu. It is believed that the supply ship was being used to deliver food and other supplies to offshore fishing fleets.

In 2021 the Taiwanese cabinet approved a NT$12.9 billion (US$428.53 million) budget for six new 3,000-ton class patrol vessels.

In May 2022 an Anping-class patrol ship launched a Hsiung Feng II anti-ship missile for the first time in a joint exercise with the Navy.

Following an incident in 2025 which a Chinese owned vessel flying a flag of convenience damaged an underwater telecommunications cable the CGA increased their monitoring of ships flying flags of convenience and increased the distance from shore at which they would be subject to routine boarding. The captain of the vessel was later convicted on charges related to the incident and sentenced to three years in prison.

== International cooperation ==
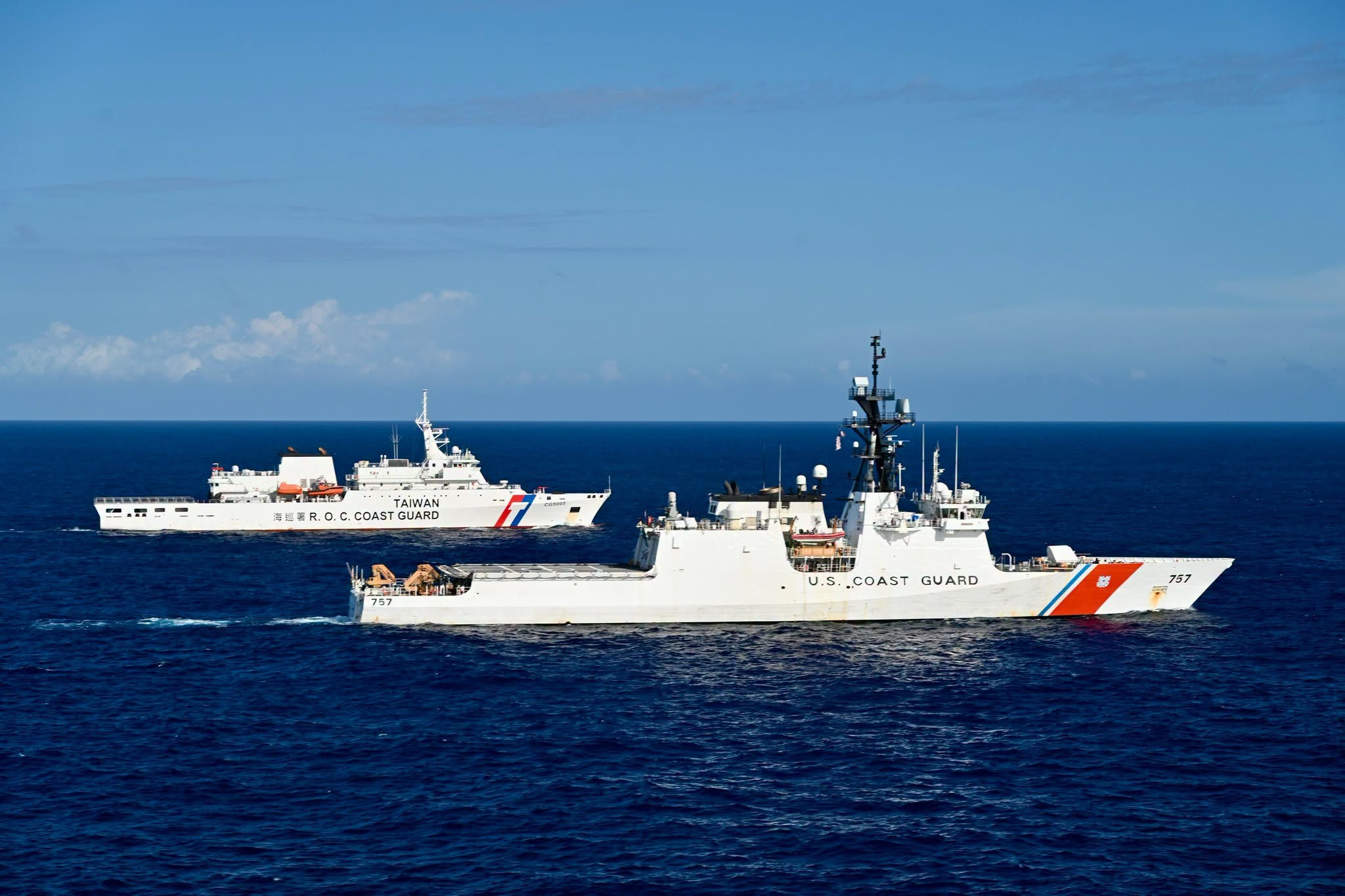
ROC Coast Guard Taipei (CG-5005) sailing alongside with USCGC Midgett (WMSL-757).

The CGA cooperates with Japan, the Philippines, Malaysia, Thailand, Indonesia, and Vietnam in operations to counter human trafficking and drug smuggling. The ROC Coast Guard and the Japan Coast Guard conduct annual exercises and visits. The ROC Coast Guard and the Philippines Coast Guard have conducted tabletop exercises and drills. The ROC Coast Guard and the US Coast Guard cooperate on monitoring longline fishing, maritime law enforcement, human trafficking, and drug smuggling.

In 2010 the ROC Coast Guard held their first ever drill with China's Maritime Search and Rescue Center. The drill, which simulated a ferry disaster between Kinmen and Xiamen, included 14 vessels, 3 helicopters, and 400 personnel. Due to the tense relations between the two countries participating forces used drill flags instead of their national flags and emblems. The second drill in 2012 involved 18 vessels and two helicopters from Taiwan, as well as 11 ships and one helicopter from China. A third drill in 2014 featured 33 vessels, four helicopters, and 550 personnel.

In 2020 the ROC Coast Guard and Chinese authorities worked out a standard operating procedure for dealing with illegal sand dredging by Chinese vessels. From implementation to December 2020 Chinese authorities had taken action in 64 cases and impounded 23 ships which demonstrated to the ROC Coast Guard that the Chinese were serious about cooperating on the issue.

In March 2021 the ROC Coast Guard and the US Coast Guard announced that they had signed a cooperation agreement, the agreement was promptly denounced by China. In May 2021 US President Joe Biden praised the cooperation agreement while speaking at the commencement of the United States Coast Guard Academy. The first bilateral meeting under the agreement occurred in August 2021.

Tuvalu and Taiwan signed a coast guard cooperation agreement in 2022. In 2023 Taiwan donated two new coast guard patrol vessels to Tuvalu.

In July 2024, the ROC Coast Guard conducted a joint search and rescue drill with the Japan Coast Guard.

In July 2025, the ROC Coast Guard signed a cooperation agreement with the Somaliland Coast Guard.

In July 2026, the ROC Coast Guard and the American Institute in Taiwan released photographs showing the Chiayi-class Taipei sailing in formation with Midgett as part of maritime cooperation between Taiwan and the United States in the Taiwan Strait and the Western Pacific.

In August 2026, Taiwan said the United States was training its coast guard in maritime patrols, law enforcement and small-boat operations after increased Chinese vessel activity around the island.

== Fleet ==
In 2021 the CGA had more than 200 vessels.

In 2021 President Tsai Ing-wen ordered the name "Taiwan" to be prominently displayed on all vessels to avoid confusion with the People's Republic of China Coast Guard which is engaged in a grey-zone campaign against Taiwan and other neighboring countries.

=== Active ===
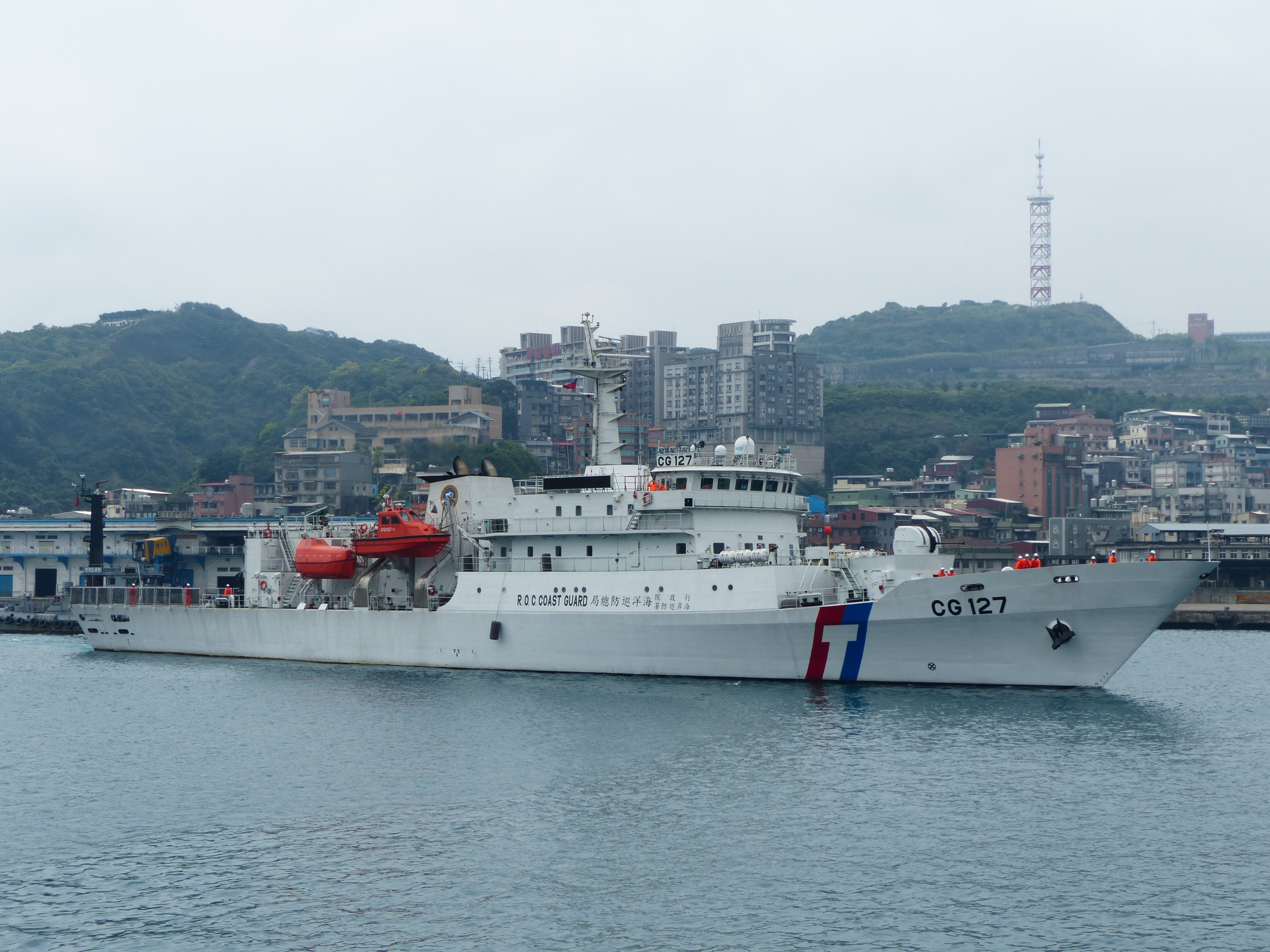
ROC Coast Guard 2,000-ton cutter Hsinbei

Bridge aboard the 1,000-ton cutter Hsun Hu #7

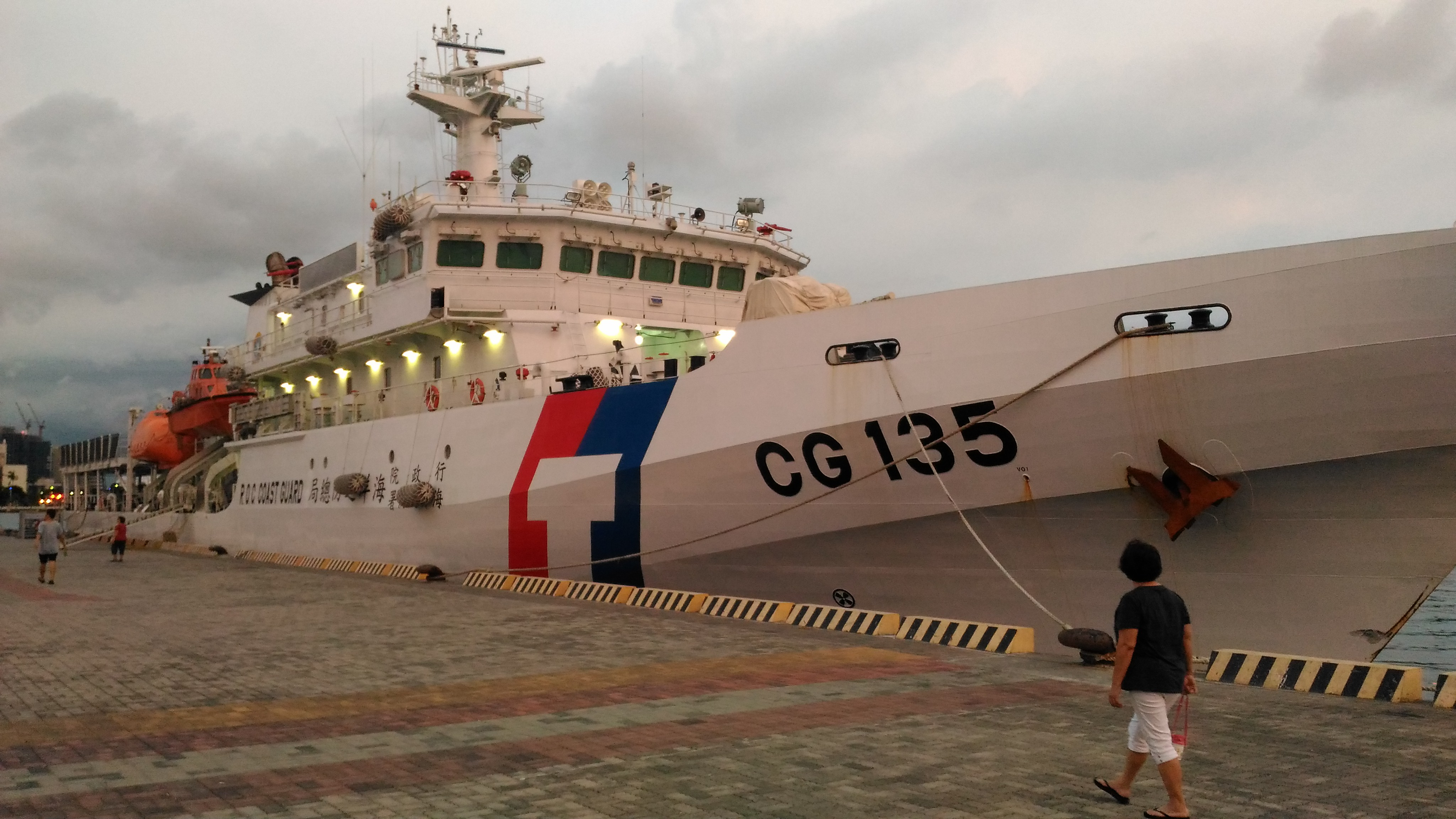
ROC Coast Guard 1000-ton cutter Pingtung

ROC Coast Guard 2000-ton cutter Taichung

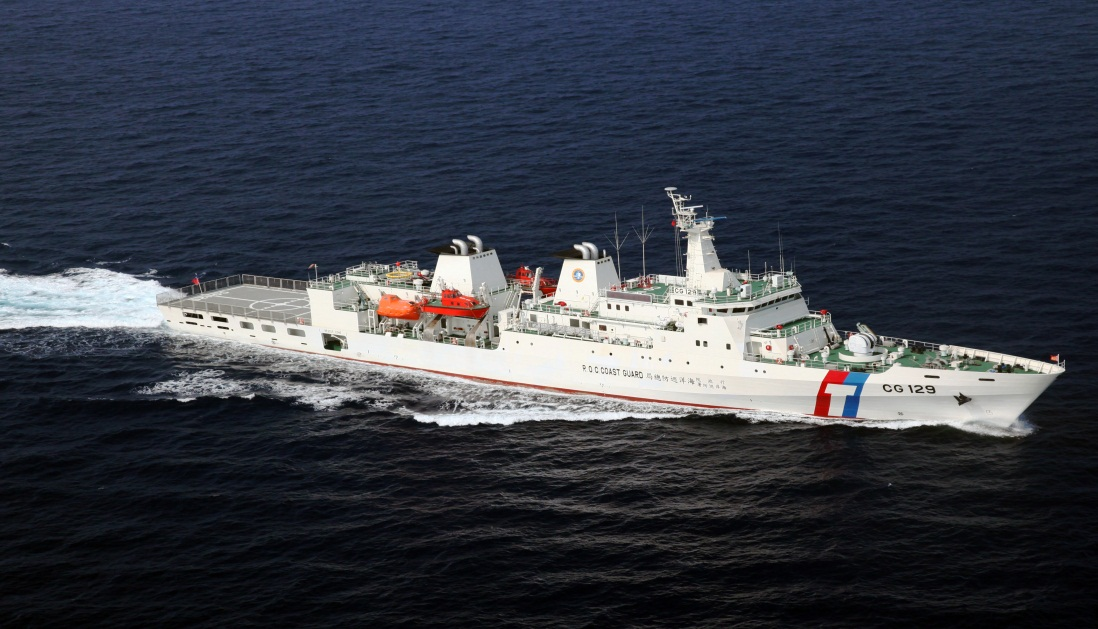
ROC Coast Guard 3000-ton cutter Kaohsiung

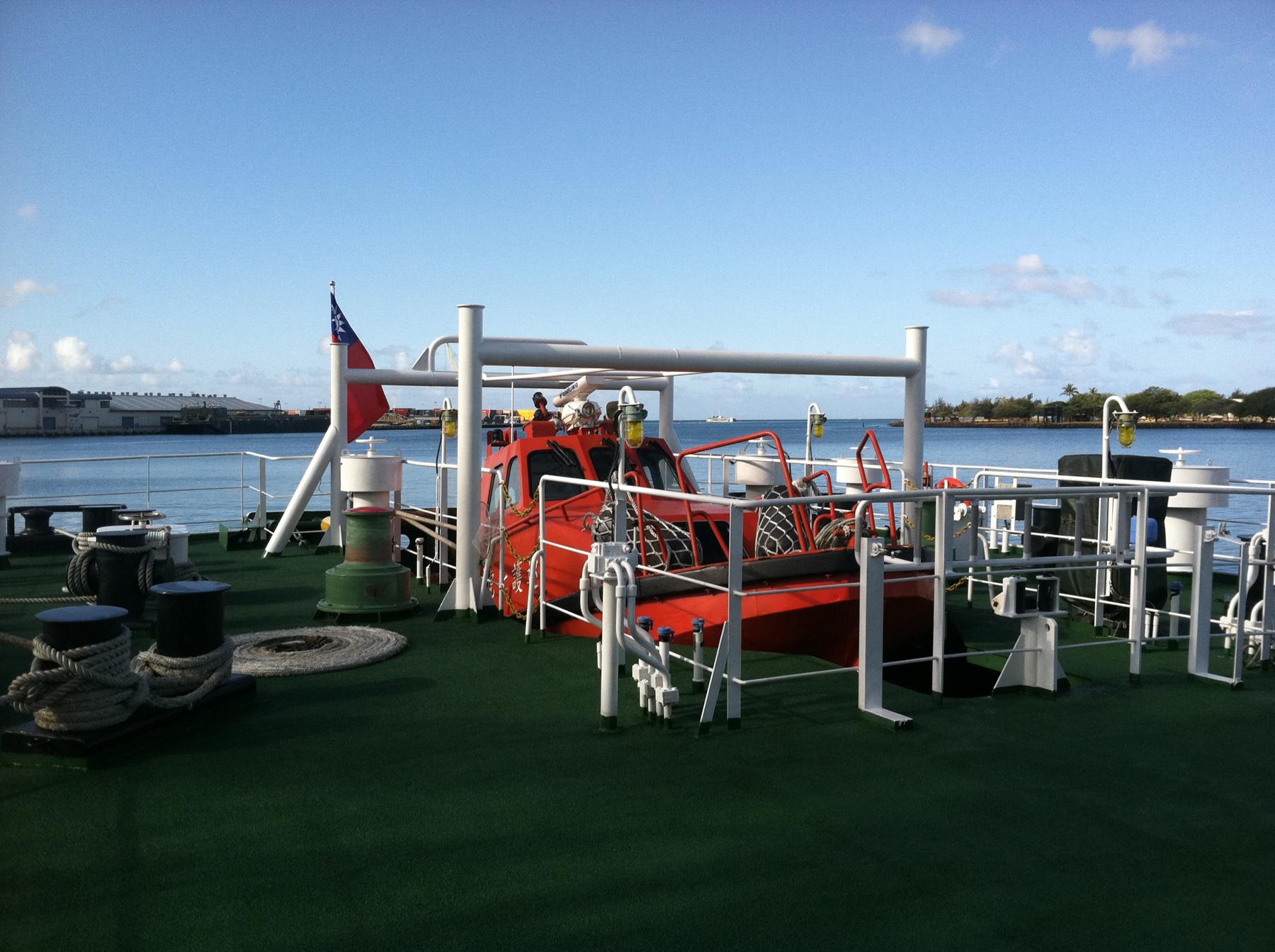
Hsun Hu #7 Response boat in its stern launching ramp

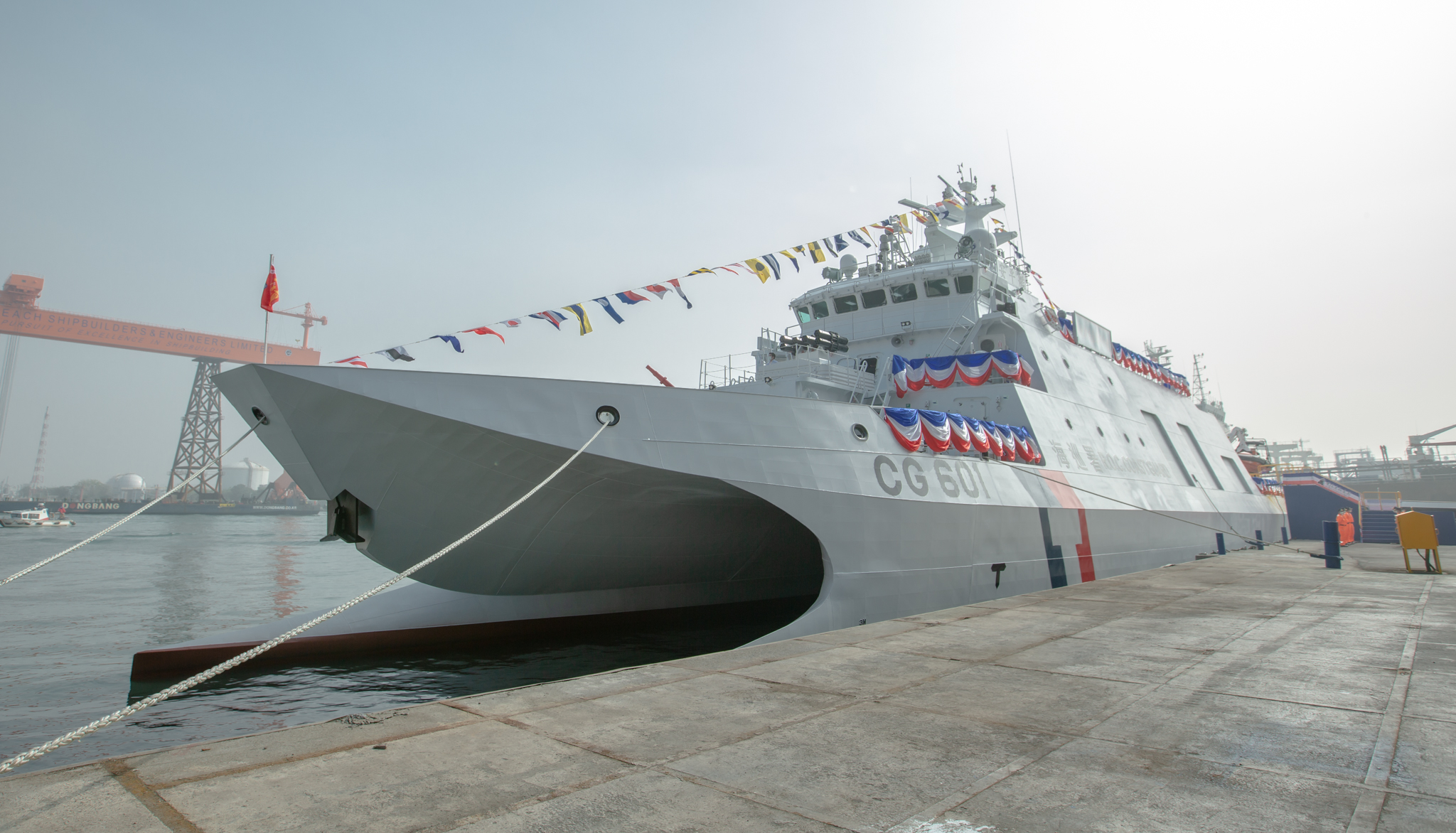
Anping-class offshore patrol vessel Anping (CG-601)

Siraya-class Pelagic patrol cutter Siraya

Chiayi-class offshore patrol vessel Yunlin (CG 5003) and Taipei (CG 5005)

Over 500 Tones
Name	Hull number	Class	Displacement (full load)	Builder	Year of enrolling
Nantou	CG122	500-ton class (Nantou)	742 tones	Jong Shyn Shipbuilding Company	2005
Tainan	CG126	2,000-ton class	2,105 tones	CSBC Corporation	2011
Hsinbei (New Taipei)	CG127	2,000-ton class	2,105 tones	CSBC Corporation	2013
Yilan	CG128	Yilan-class patrol vessel (3,000-ton class)	3,719 tons	Jong Shyn Shipbuilding Company	2015
Kaohsiung	CG129	Yilan-class patrol vessel (3,000-ton class)	3,719 tons	Jong Shyn Shipbuilding Company	2015
Miaoli	CG131	Miaoli-class patrol vessel (1,000-ton class)	1,899 tones	Jong Shyn Shipbuilding Company	2015
Taoyuan	CG132	Miaoli-class patrol vessel (1,000-ton class)	1,899 tones	Jong Shyn Shipbuilding Company	2015
Taitung	CG133	Miaoli-class patrol vessel (1,000-ton class)	1,899 tones	Jong Shyn Shipbuilding Company	2016
Pingtung	CG135	Miaoli-class patrol vessel (1,000-ton class)	1,899 tones	Jong Shyn Shipbuilding Company	2016
Anping	CG601	Anping-class offshore patrol vessel (600-ton class)	700 tones	Jong Shyn Shipbuilding Company	2020
Cheng Kung	CG602	Anping-class offshore patrol vessel (600-ton class)	700 tones	Jong Shyn Shipbuilding Company	2021
Tamsui	CG603	Anping-class offshore patrol vessel (600-ton class)	700 tones	Jong Shyn Shipbuilding Company	2021
Cijin	CG605	Anping-class offshore patrol vessel (600-ton class)	700 tones	Jong Shyn Shipbuilding Company	2022
Bali	CG606	Anping-class offshore patrol vessel (600-ton class)	700 tones	Jong Shyn Shipbuilding Company	2022
Ji’an	CG607	Anping-class offshore patrol vessel (600-ton class)	700 tones	Jong Shyn Shipbuilding Company	2023
Wanli	CG609	Anping-class offshore patrol vessel (600-ton class)	700 tones	Jong Shyn Shipbuilding Company	2023
Yungkang	CG610	Anping-class offshore patrol vessel (600-ton class)	700 tones	Jong Shyn Shipbuilding Company	2024
Changbin	CG611	Anping-class offshore patrol vessel (600-ton class)	700 tones	Jong Shyn Shipbuilding Company	2025
Suao	CG612	Anping-class offshore patrol vessel (600-ton class)	700 tones	Jong Shyn Shipbuilding Company	2025
Lanyu	CG613	Anping-class offshore patrol vessel (600-ton class)	700 tones	Jong Shyn Shipbuilding Company	2026
Donggang	CG615	Anping-class offshore patrol vessel (600-ton class)	700 tones	Jong Shyn Shipbuilding Company	Launched
Chiayi	CG5001	Chiayi-class patrol vessel (4,000-ton class)	5,044 tones	CSBC Corporation	2020
Hsinchu	CG5002	Chiayi-class patrol vessel (4,000-ton class)	5,044 tones	CSBC Corporation	2022
Yunlin	CG5003	Chiayi-class patrol vessel (4,000-ton class)	5,044 tones	CSBC Corporation	2024
Taipei	CG5005	Chiayi-class patrol vessel (4,000-ton class)	5,044 tones	CSBC Corporation	2025
Changhua	CG1001	1,000-ton class	2,167 tones	CSBC Corporation	2022
Taichung	CG1002	1,000-ton class	2,167 tones	CSBC Corporation	2023
Lienchiang	CG1005	1,000-ton class	2,167 tones	CSBC Corporation	2024
Hualien	CG1006	1,000-ton class	2,167 tones	CSBC Corporation	2025
Penghu	CG1007	1,000-ton class	2,167 tones	CSBC Corporation	2026
Keelung	CG1008	1,000-ton class	2,167 tones	CSBC Corporation	Launched
Hsun-Hu No.7		1,000-ton class	1,915 tones	Jong Shyn Shipbuilding Company	2011
Hsun-Hu No.8		1,000-ton class	1,915 tones	Jong Shyn Shipbuilding Company	2013
Hsun-Hu No.9		1,000-ton class	1,915 tones	Jong Shyn Shipbuilding Company	2013
Siraya(西拉雅)		Siraya-class patrol vessel (3,000-ton class)	5,200 tones	CSBC Corporation	2026
Hsun-Hu No.11		Siraya-class patrol vessel (3,000-ton class)	5,200 tones	CSBC Corporation	Under Construction
Hsun-Hu No.12		Siraya-class patrol vessel (3,000-ton class)	5,200 tones	CSBC Corporation	Under Construction
Hsun-Hu No.13		Siraya-class patrol vessel (3,000-ton class)	5,200 tones	CSBC Corporation	Under Construction
Hsun-Hu No.15		Siraya-class patrol vessel (3,000-ton class)	5,200 tones	CSBC Corporation	Under planning
Hsun-Hu No.16		Siraya-class patrol vessel (3,000-ton class)	5,200 tones	CSBC Corporation	Under planning
(TBD)		8,000-ton class	(TBD)	(TBD)	Under Planning
(TBD)		8,000-ton class	(TBD)	(TBD)	Under planning
(TBD)		2,000-ton class	(TBD)	(TBD)	Under Planning
(TBD)		2,000-ton class	(TBD)	(TBD)	Under planning
(TBD)		2,000-ton class	(TBD)	(TBD)	Under planning
(TBD)		2,000-ton class	(TBD)	(TBD)	Under planning
(TBD)		2,000-ton class	(TBD)	(TBD)	Under planning
(TBD)		2,000-ton class	(TBD)	(TBD)	Under planning
(TBD)		2,000-ton class	(TBD)	(TBD)	Under planning
(TBD)		2,000-ton class	(TBD)	(TBD)	Under planning
(TBD)		2,000-ton class	(TBD)	(TBD)	Under planning
(TBD)		2,000-ton class	(TBD)	(TBD)	Under planning

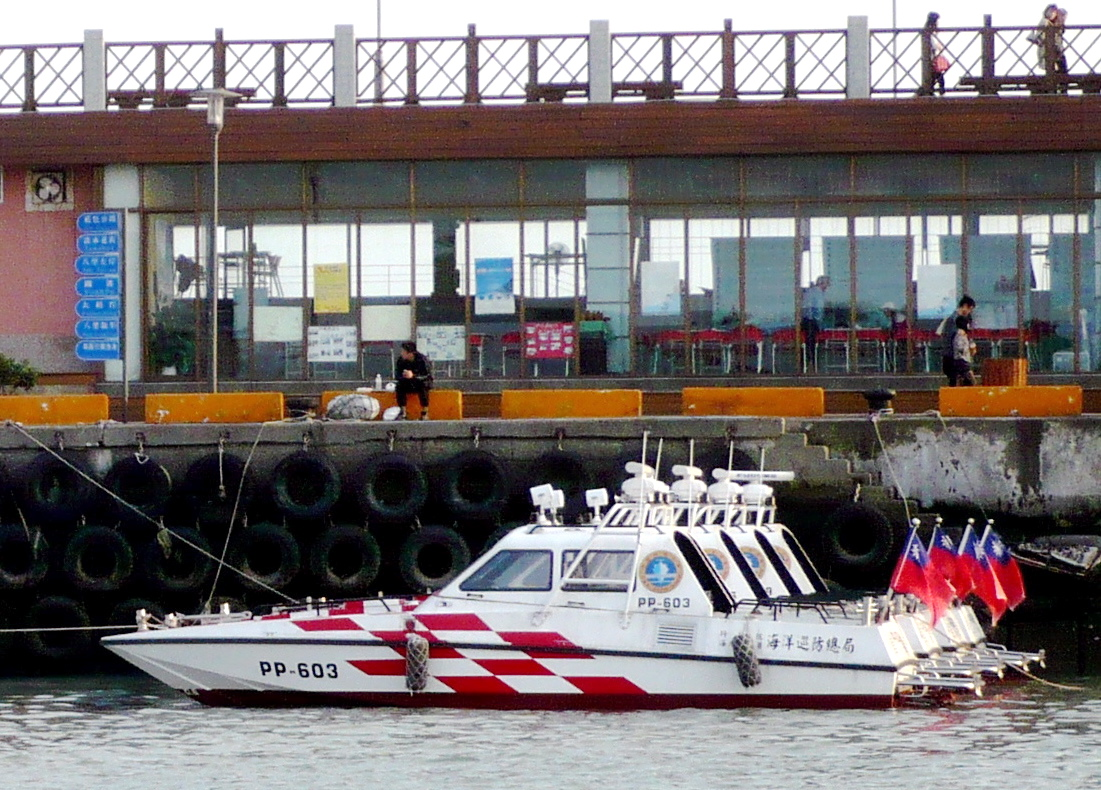
ROCCGA patrol boats in 2008

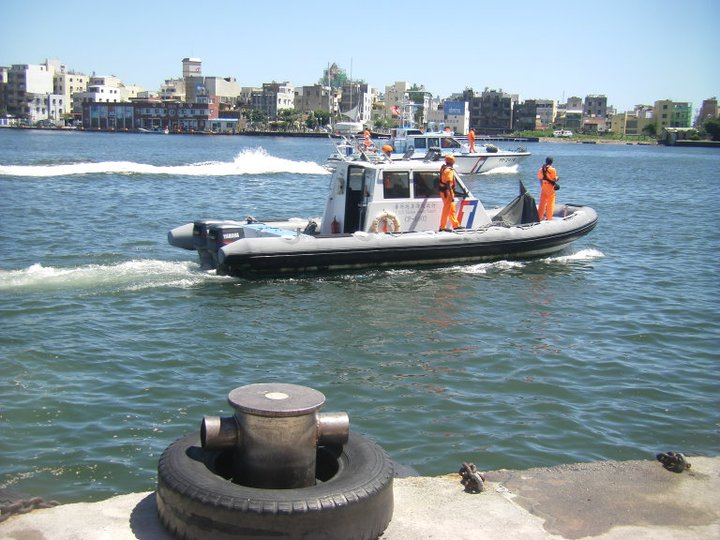
Patrol boats CP-1002 and PP-2016 in 2013

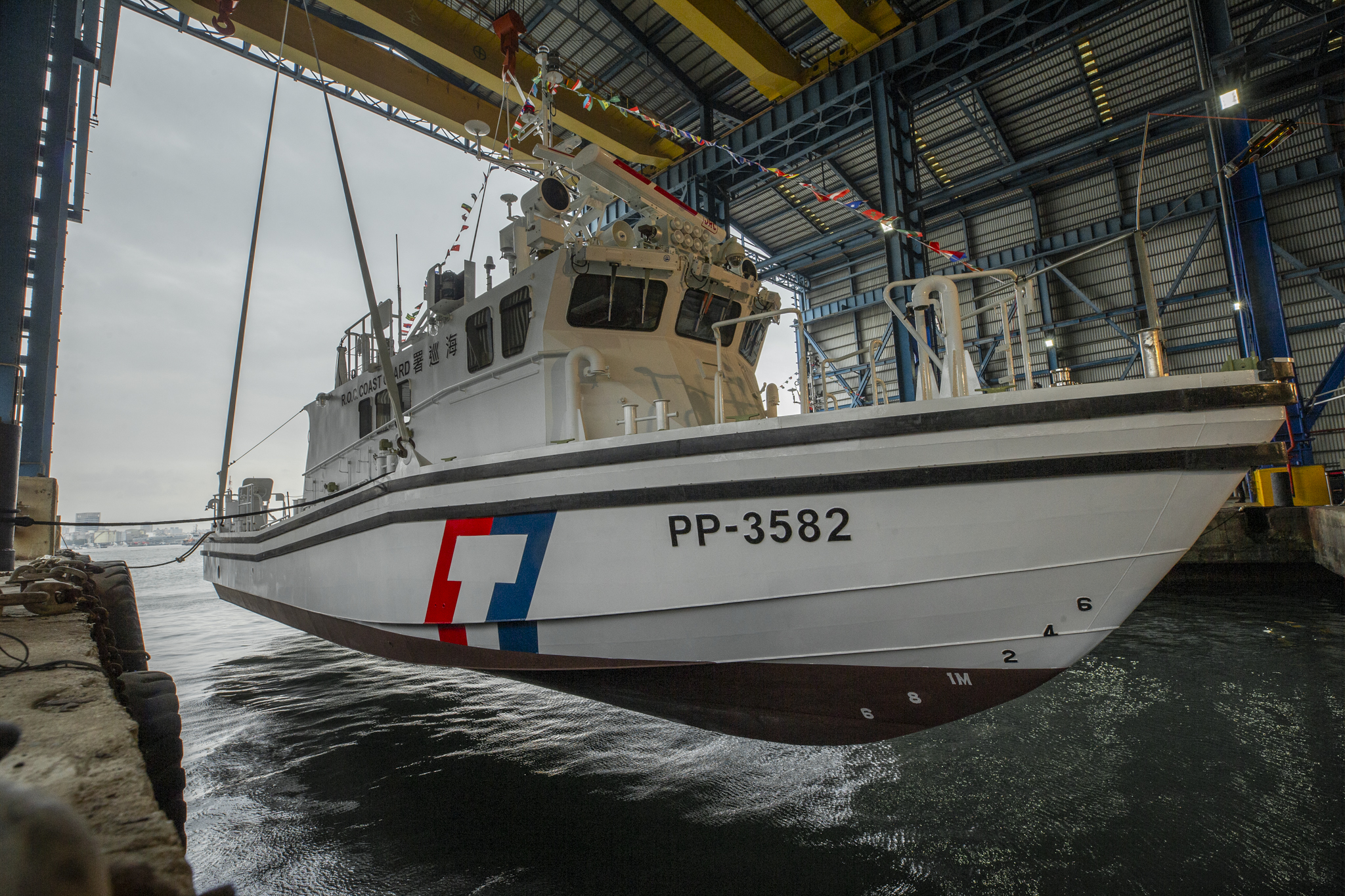
Patrol vessel PP-3582 in 2019

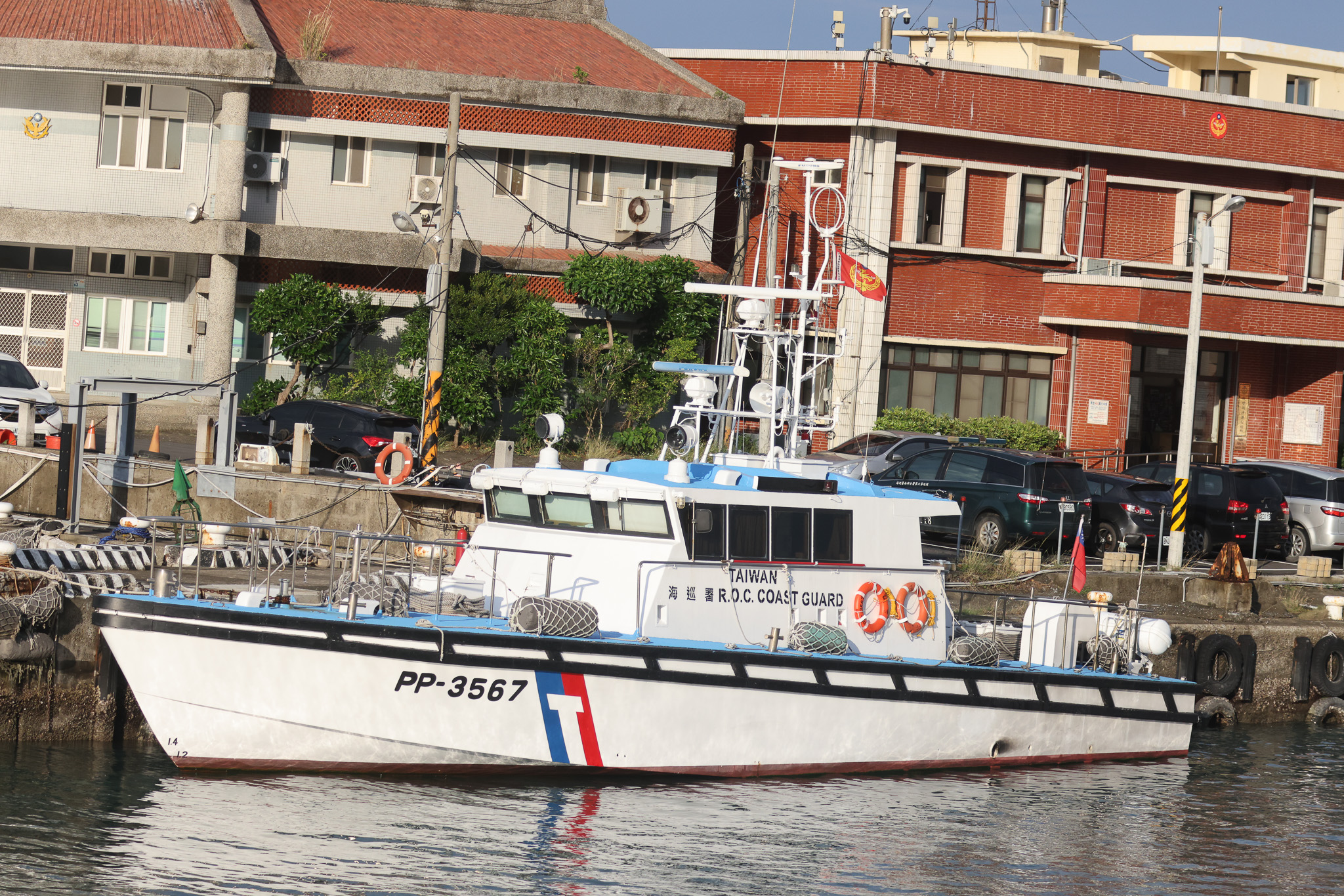
Patrol vessel PP-3567 in 2024

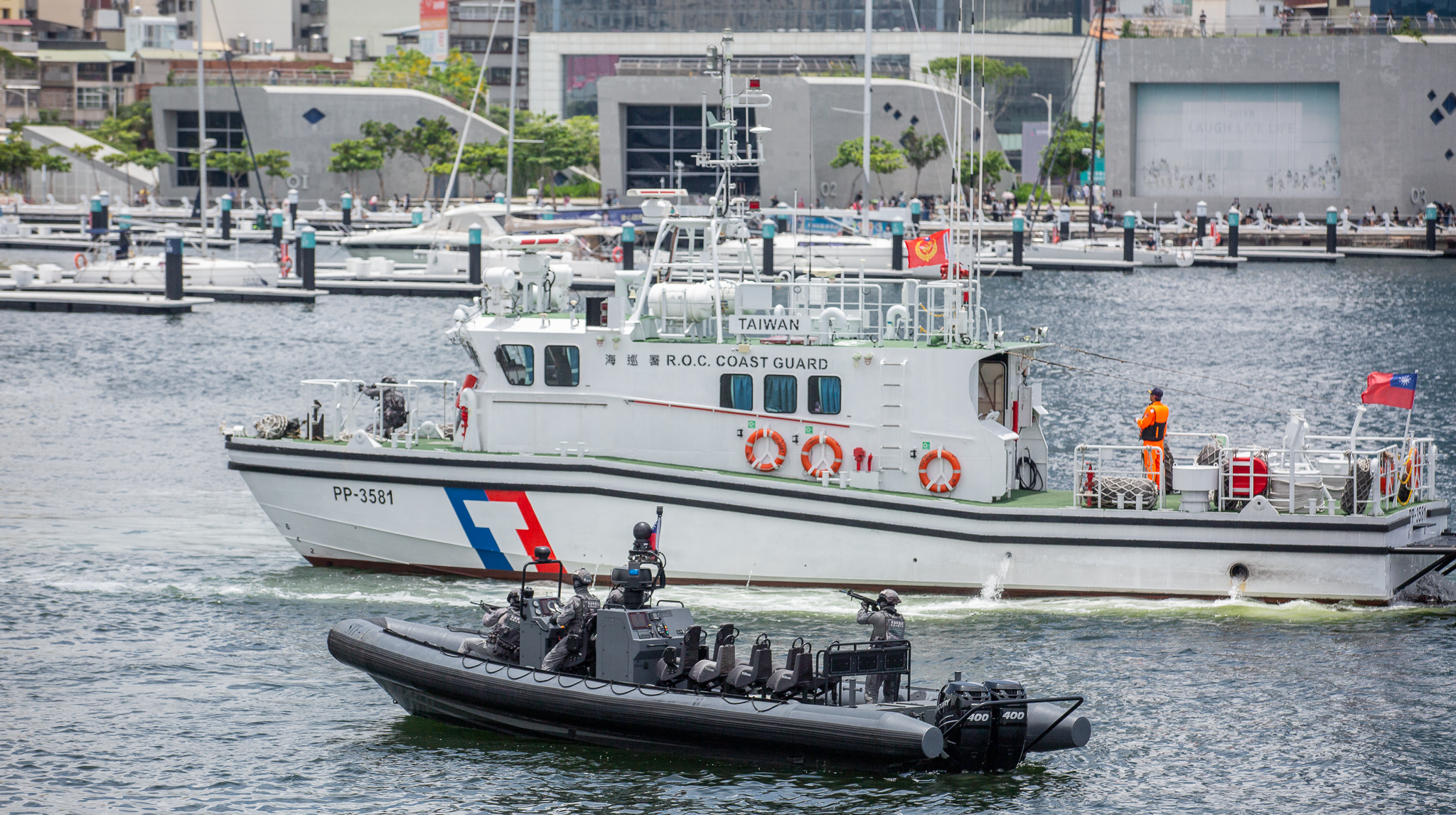
Patrol vessel PP-3581 in 2023 alongside a M109 assault boat

Under 500 Tones
Class	In service	Hull numbers	Displacement (full load)	Builder
100-ton class 1st generation type 1	8	PP-10001; PP-10002; PP-10005; PP-10006; PP-10007; PP-10008; PP-10009; PP-10010	103 tones	Jong Shyn Shipbuilding Company
100-ton class 1st generation type 2	10	PP-10011; PP-10013; PP-10015; PP-10016; PP-10017; PP-10018; PP-10019; PP-10020; PP-10022; PP-10023	103 tones	Jong Shyn Shipbuilding Company; Lungteh Shipbuilding
100-ton class 2nd generation	3	PP-10025; PP-10026; PP-10027	118 tones	Jong Shyn Shipbuilding Company
100-ton class 3rd generation type 1	3	PP-10028; PP-10029; PP-10031	95 tones	Lungteh Shipbuilding
100-ton class 3rd generation type 2	35	PP-10032; PP-10033; PP-10035; PP-10037; PP-10038; PP-10039; PP-10050; PP-10051; PP-10052; PP-10053; PP-10055; PP-10056; PP-10057; PP-10059; PP-10060; PP-10061; PP-10062; PP-10063; PP-10065; PP-10066; PP-10068; PP-10069; PP-10070; PP-10071; PP-10072; PP-10073; PP-10075; PP-10077; PP-10078; PP-10079; PP-10080; PP-10081; PP-10082; PP-10083; PP-10086	174 tones	Ching Fu Shipbuilding
100-ton class 4th generation	12 (total 17 in the future)	PP-10087; PP-10088; PP-10089; PP-10090; PP-10091; PP-10092; PP-10093; PP-10095; PP-10096; PP-10097; PP-10098; PP-10099	319 tones	Jong Shyn Shipbuilding Company
60-ton class	5	PP-6001, PP-6002, PP-6005, PP-6006, PP-6007	68 tones	Lungteh Shipbuilding
55-ton class	10	PP-5501, PP-5502, PP-5503, PP-5505, PP-5506, PP-5507, PP-5508, PP-5509, PP-5510, PP-5511	82 tones	(unknown)
50-ton class 1st generation type 1	13	PP-5001, PP-5002, PP-5003, PP-5005, PP-5006, PP-5007, PP-5008, PP-5010, PP-5011, PP-5012, PP-5013, PP-5015, PP-5016	56 tones	Lungteh Shipbuilding
50-ton class 1st generation type 2	14	PP-5017, PP-5019, PP-5020, PP-5021, PP-5022, PP-5023, PP-5025, PP-5026, PP-5027, PP-5028, PP-5029, PP-5030, PP-5031, PP-5032	76 tones	TC Yachts
50-ton class 2nd generation	9	PP-5033, PP-5035, PP-5037, PP-5038, PP-5039, PP-5050, PP-5051, PP-5052, PP-5053	56 tones	Lungteh Shipbuilding
35-ton class 1st generation	28	PP-3501, PP-3502, PP-3503, PP-3505, PP-3506, PP-3507, PP-3508, PP-3509, PP-3510, PP-3511, PP-3512, PP-3513, PP-3516, PP-3517, PP-3518, PP-3519, PP-3520, PP-3521, PP-3522, PP-3523, PP-3525, PP-3526, PP-3527, PP-3528, PP-3529, PP-3530, PP-3531, PP-3532	29 tones	(unknown)
35-ton class 2nd generation	24	PP-3535, PP-3536, PP-3537, PP-3538, PP-3539, PP-3550, PP-3552, PP-3553, PP-3555, PP-3556, PP-3557, PP-3558, PP-3559, PP-3560, PP-3561, PP-3562, PP-3563, PP-3565, PP-3566, PP-3567, PP-3568, PP-3572, PP-3576, PP-3580	33 tones	Lungteh Shipbuilding
30-ton class	13	PP-3002, PP-3003, PP-3005, PP-3006, PP-3007, PP-3009, PP-3011, PP-3012, PP-3015, PP-3016, PP-3017, PP-3018, PP-3019	29 tones	Lungteh Shipbuilding
20-ton class	45	PP-2001, PP-2003, PP-2005, PP-2006, PP-2007, PP-2008, PP-2009, PP-2010, PP-2012, PP-2013, PP-2015, PP-‐2016, PP-2017, PP-2018, PP-2019, PP-2021, PP-2022, PP-‐2023, PP-2025, PP-2027, PP-2028, PP-2029, PP-2030, PP-2031, PP-2032, PP-2033, PP-2035, PP-2036, PP-2037, PP-2038, PP-2050, PP-2051, PP-2052, PP-2053, PP-2055, PP-2056, PP-2058, PP-2059, PP-2060, PP-2061, PP-2062, PP-2063, PP-2065, PP-2066, PP-2067	21 tones	Lungteh Shipbuilding

- RB-01 (Search/Rescue Boat)
- RB-02 (Search/Rescue Boat)
- RB-03 (Search/Rescue Boat)
- Type CP-1001 (Rubber raft) x9
- Type SF-801 (Speedboat) x6
- Type PP-601 (Speedboat) x9

=== Retired ===
Retired Fleet
Name	Hull number	Class	Displacement (full load)	Builder	Year of enrolling	Year of decommissioning
Wei-Hsing	CG102	1800-ton class	1,823 tones	CSBC Corporation	1992	2022
Ho-Hsing	CG101	1,800-ton class	1,823 tones	China Shipbuilding Corporation	1992	2022
Mo-Hsing	CG105	800-ton class	917 tones	Wilton-Fijenoord	1988	2022
Fu-Hsing	CG106	800-ton class	917 tones	Wilton-Fijenoord	1988	2020
Pao-Hsing	CG107	500-ton class (Pao-Hsing)	694 tones	China Shipbuilding Corporation	1980	2008
Chin-Hsing	CG108	500-ton class (Pao-Hsing)	694 tones	China Shipbuilding Corporation	1985	2010
Te-Hsing	CG109	500-ton class (Te-Hsing)	701 tones	USUKI SHIPYARD CO., LTD.	1977	2014
Hsun-Hsing	CG110	300-ton class	264 tones	China Shipbuilding Corporation	1986	2005
Hualien	CG119	500-ton class	620 tones	Ching Fu Shipbuilding	2001	2025
Penghu	CG120	500-ton class	620 tones	Ching Fu Shipbuilding	2001	2025
Kimmen	CG123	500-ton class (Kimmen)	688 tones	Jong Shyn Shipbuilding Company	2008	2026
Lienchiang	CG125	500-ton class (Kimmen)	688 tones	Jong Shyn Shipbuilding Company	2008	2023
Taipei	CG116	500-ton class (Taipei)	742 tones	Jong Shyn Shipbuilding Company	2001	2023
Taichung	CG117	600-ton class	827 tones	Ching Fu Shipbuilding	2001	2023
Hsun-Hu No.1		800-ton class	1,127 tones	United Shipbuilding (Taiwan)	1992	2025
Hsun-Hu No.2		400-ton class	839 tones	Jong Shyn Shipbuilding Company	1992	2013
Hsun-Hu No.3		400-ton class	839 tones	Jong Shyn Shipbuilding Company	1992	2013
Hsun-Hu No.5		100-ton class	140 tones	Feng-Kuo Shipbuilding	1992	2014
Hsun-Hu No.6		300-ton class	228 tones	Feng-Kuo Shipbuilding	1992	2020

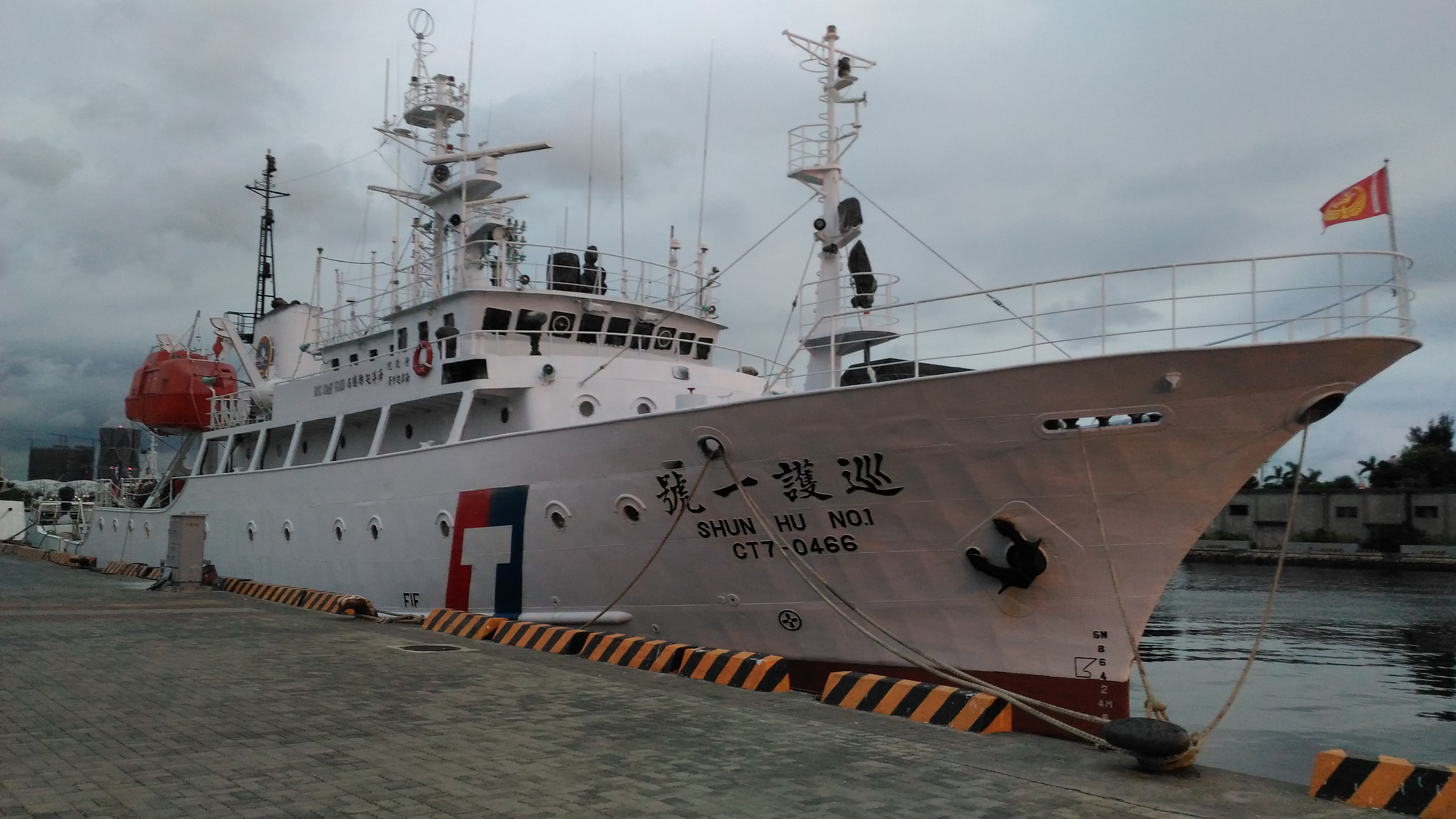
Shun Hu No. 1

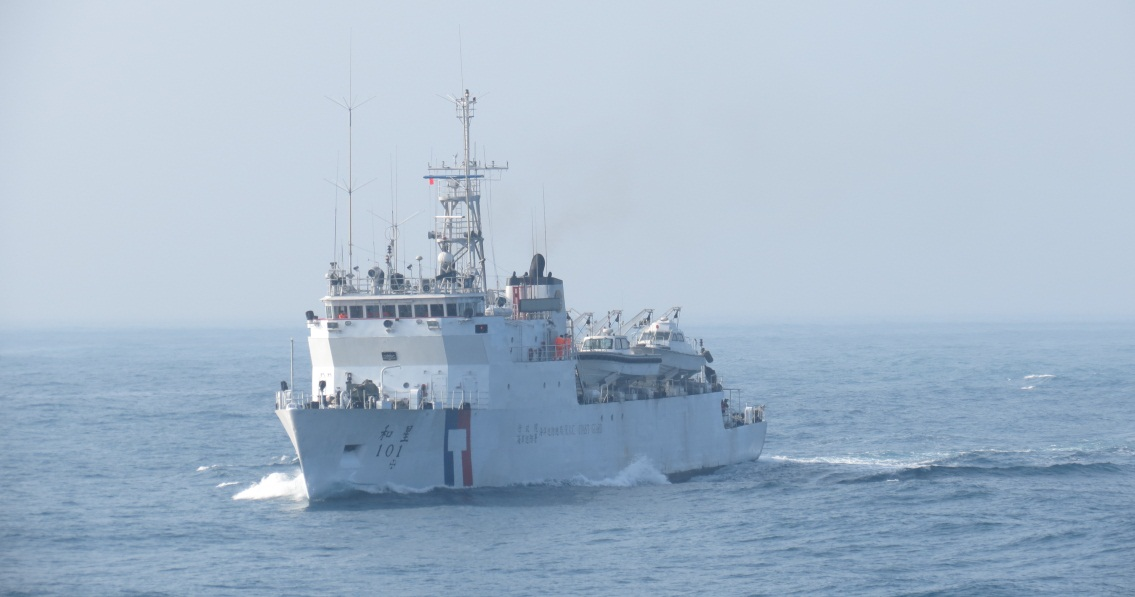
CG-101 Ho Hsing

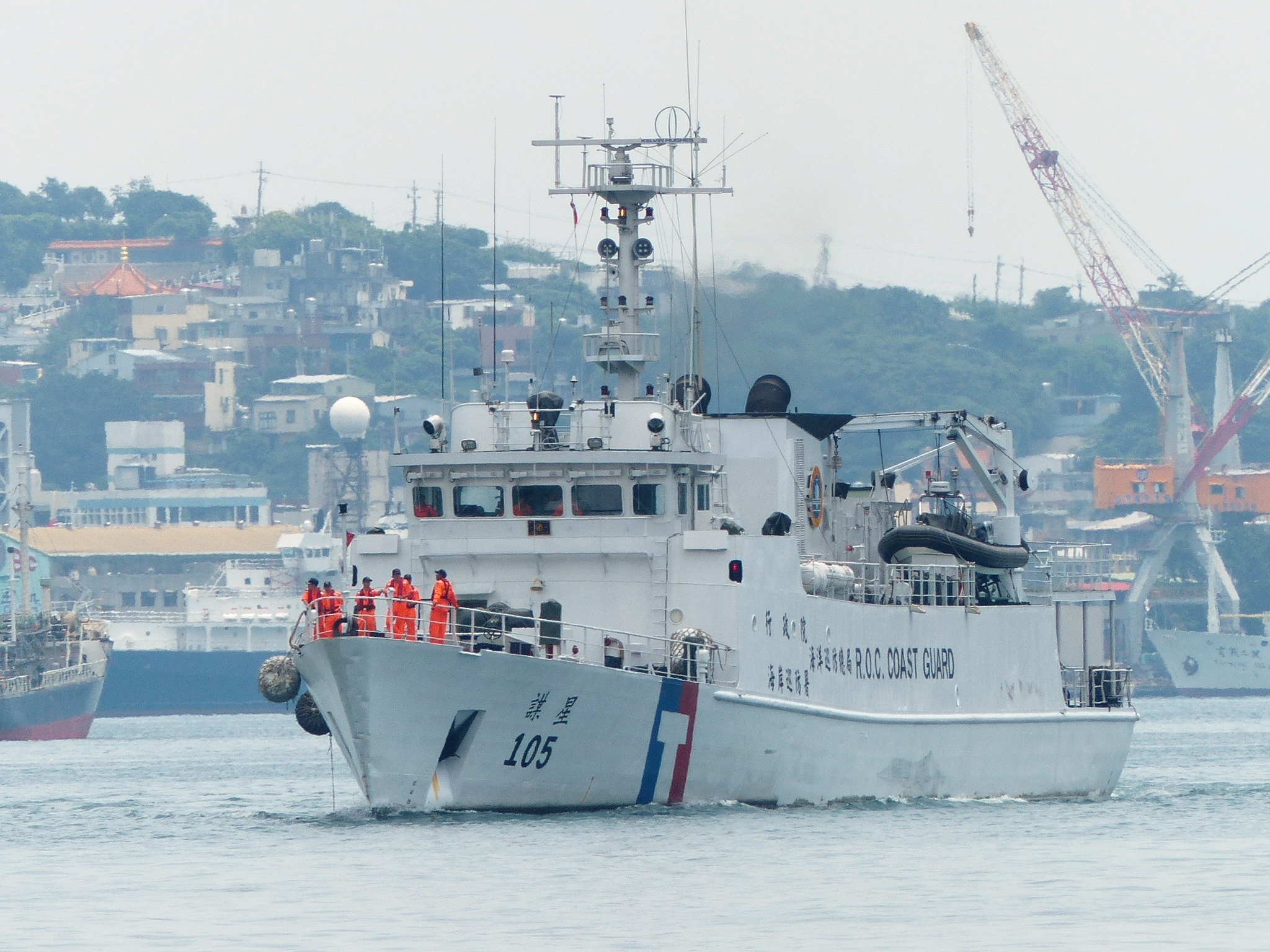
CG-105 Mou Hsing

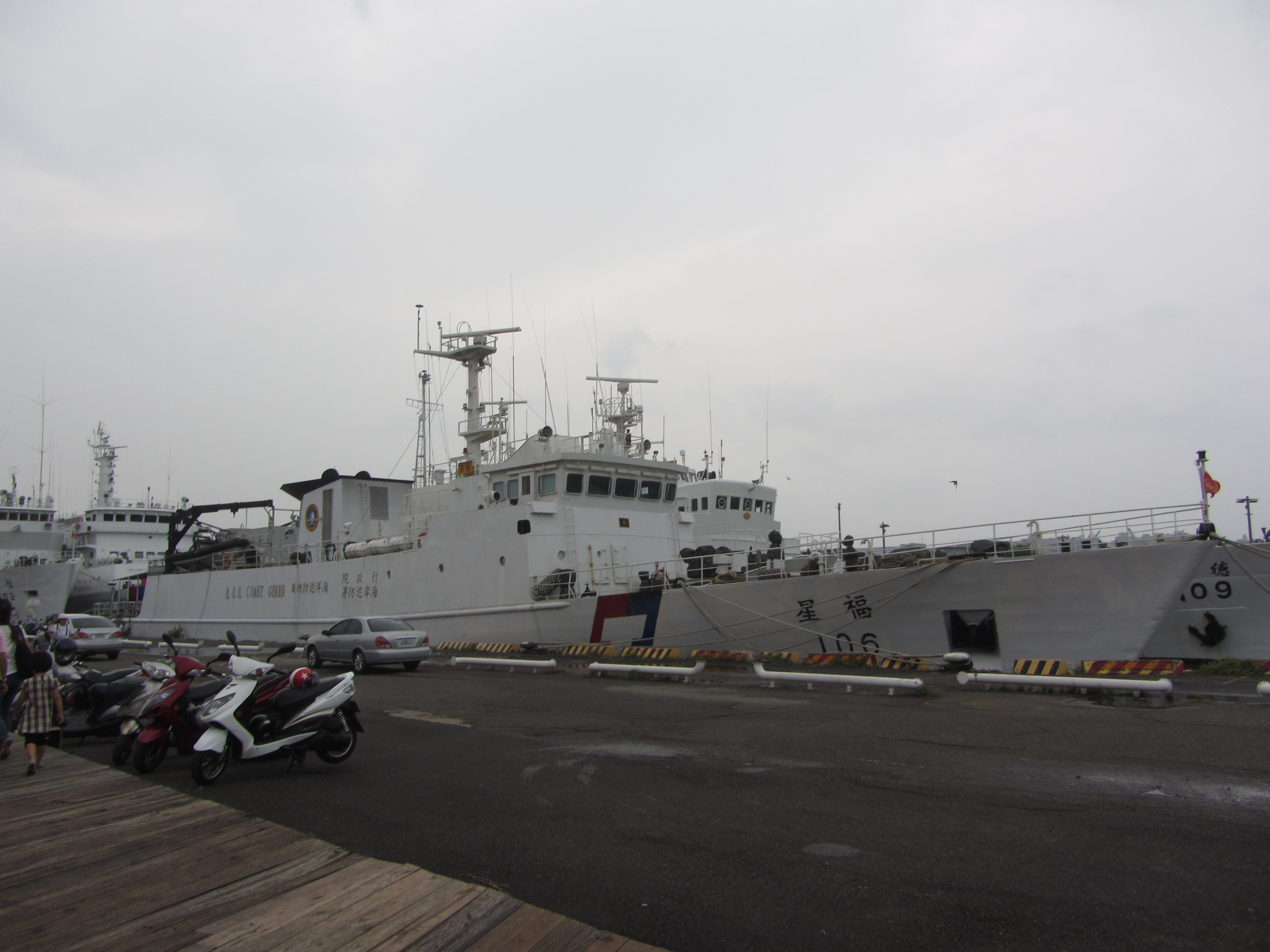
CG-106

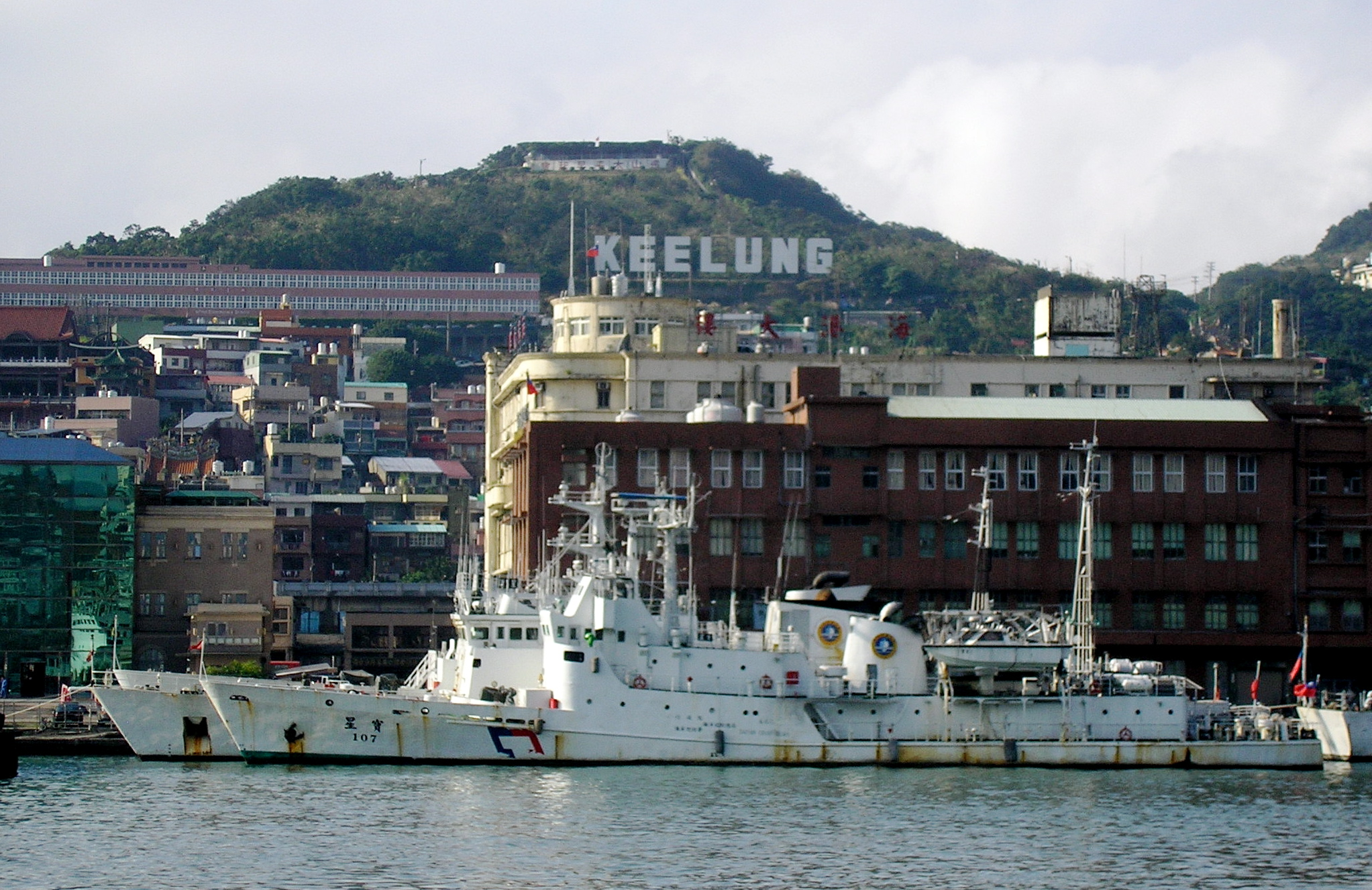
CG-107 Pao Hsing

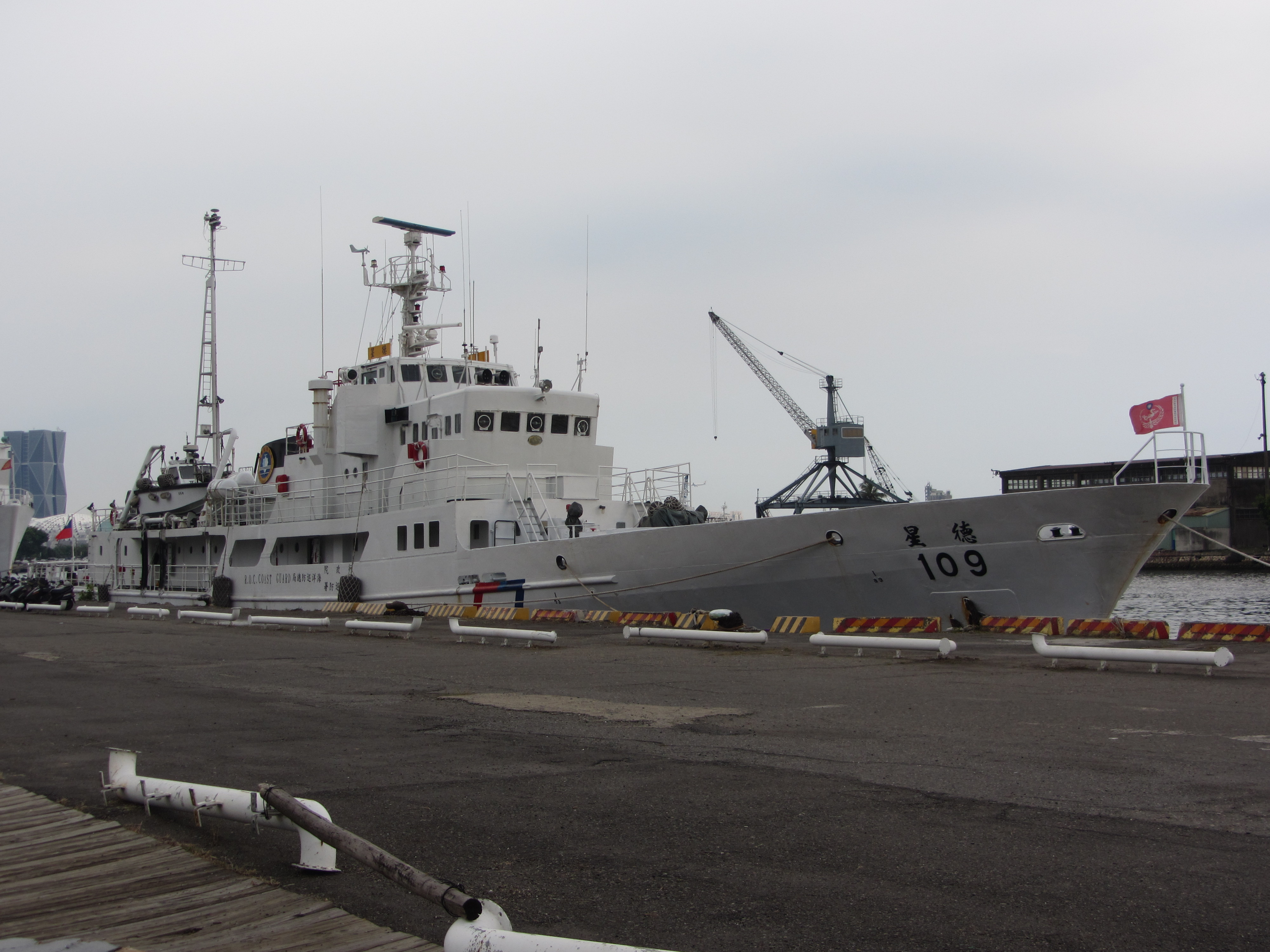
CG-109 Teh-Hsing

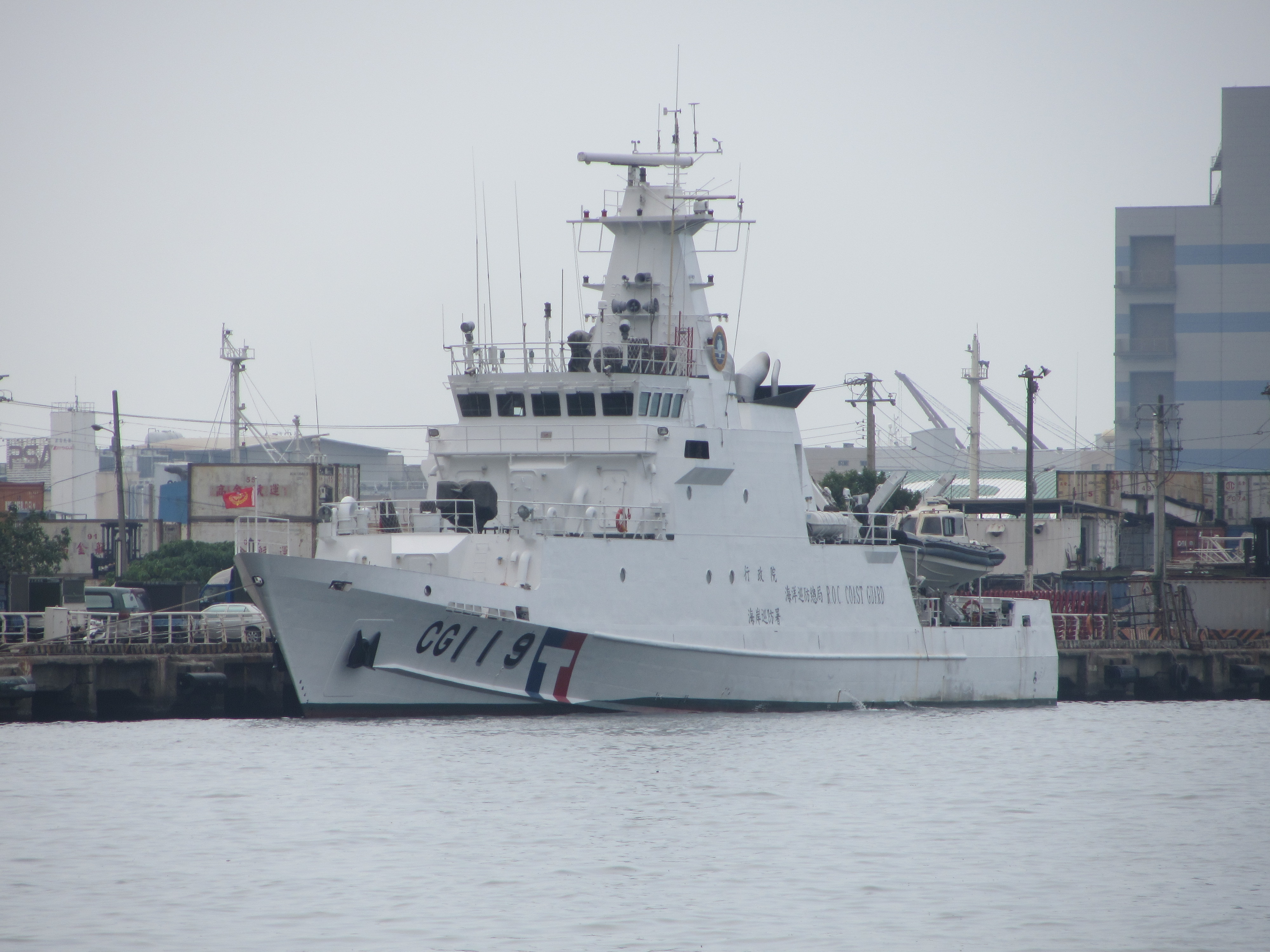
CG-119 Hualien

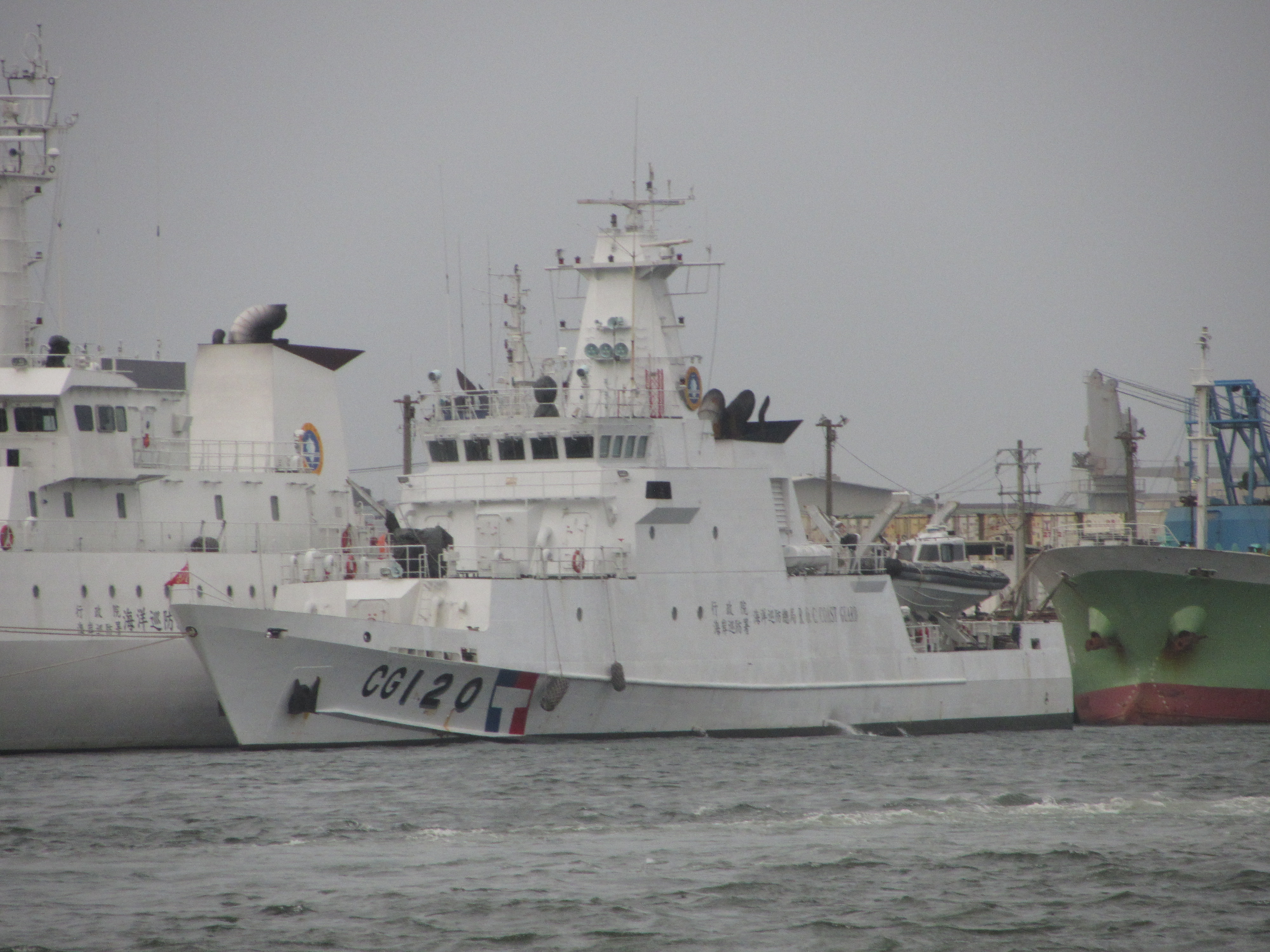
CG-120 Penghu

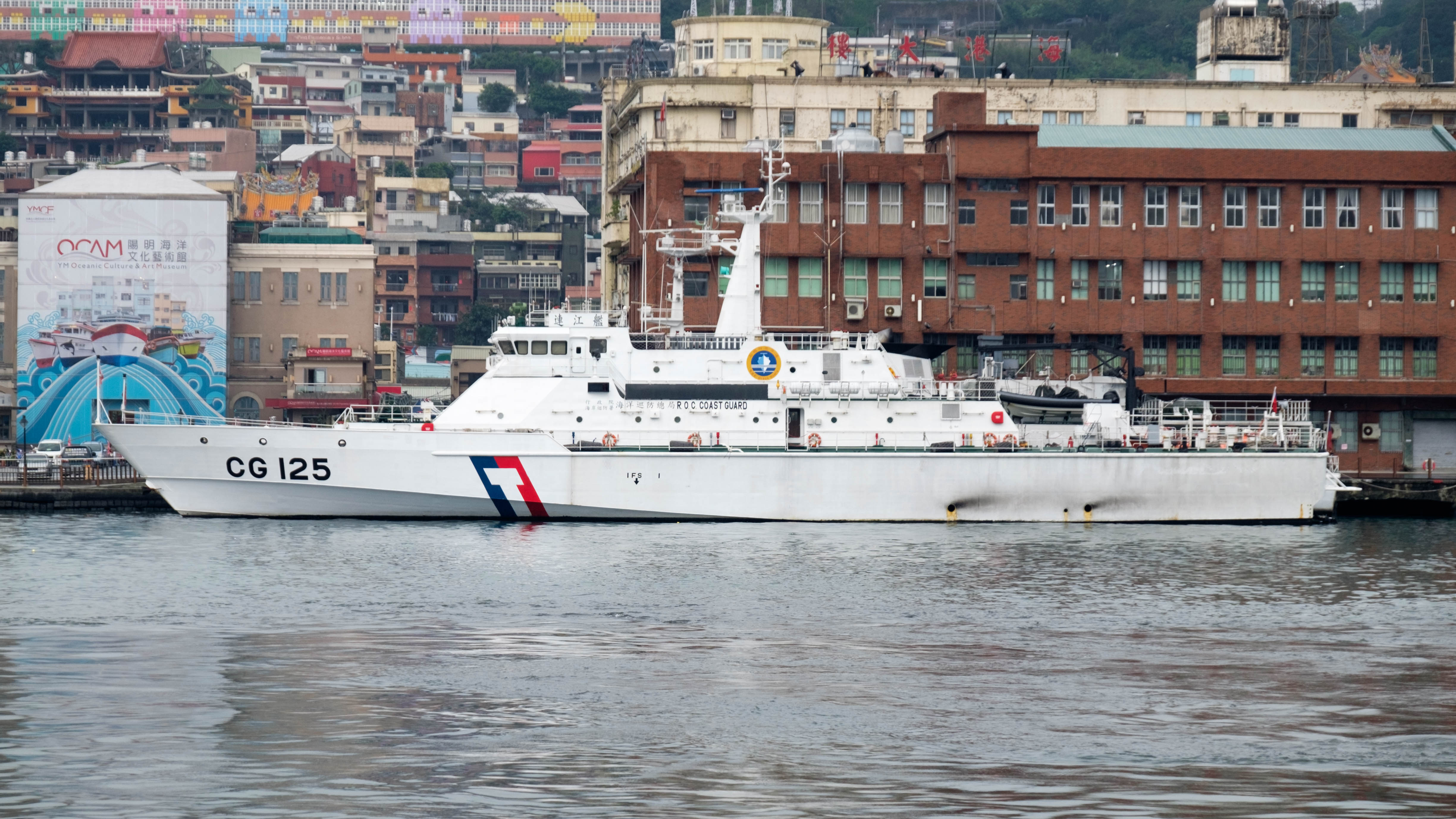
CG-125 Lienchiang

== Equipment ==
=== Helicopters and drones ===
- 20 x AVIX AXH E230RS drone helicopters
- AeroVironment JUMP 20
- Shield AI MQ-35 V-BAT
- MARTAC Devil Ray T24
National Airborne Service Corps (NASC) helicopter onboard Yunlin (CG-5002)

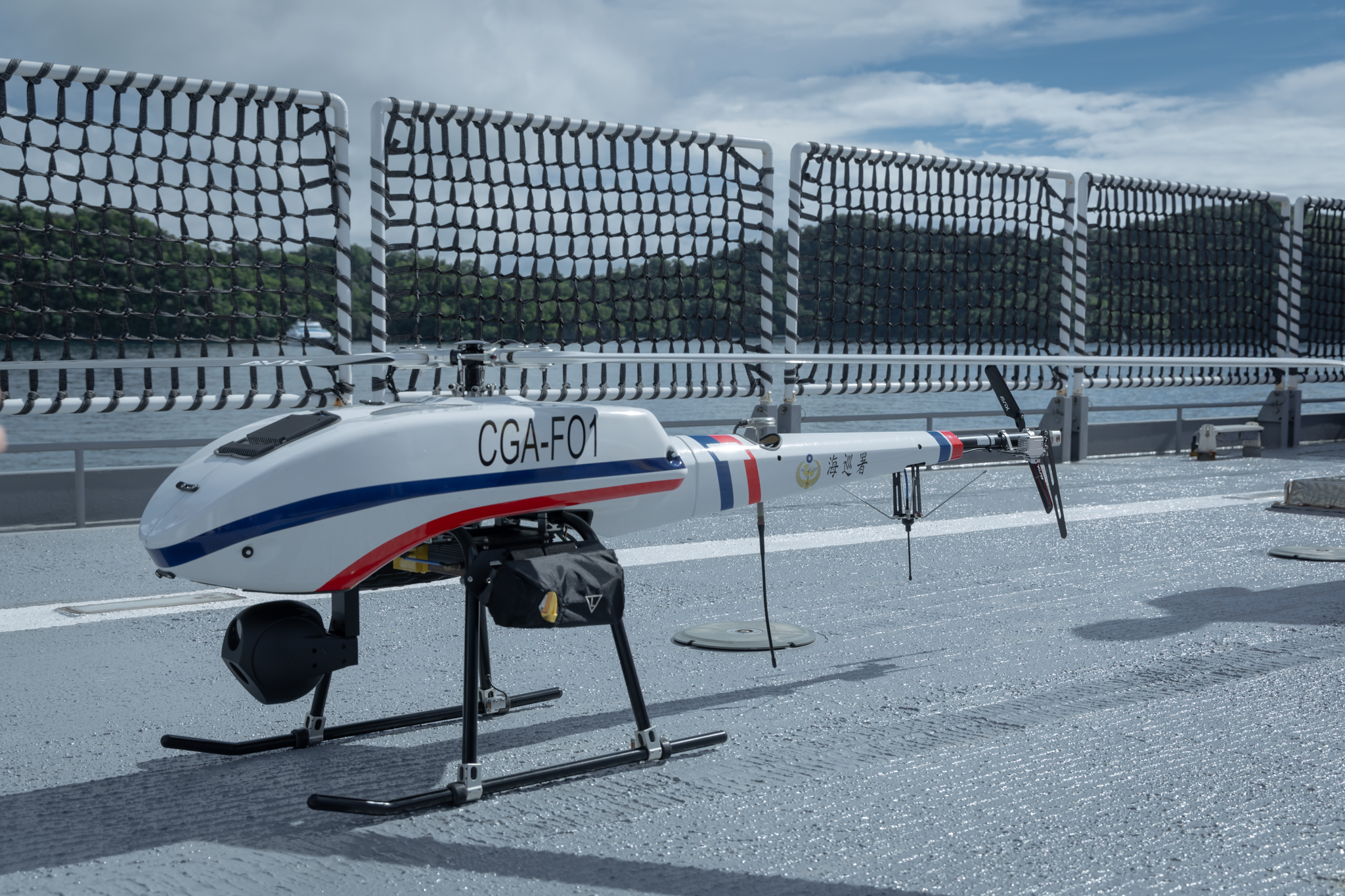
Coast Guard Administration AXH-E230RS aircraft

Shield AI MQ-35 V-BAT

=== Light weapons ===
CGA STU operators carrying SIG MCX and DD Mk 18

CGA STU operators carrying SIG MCX and DD Mk 18

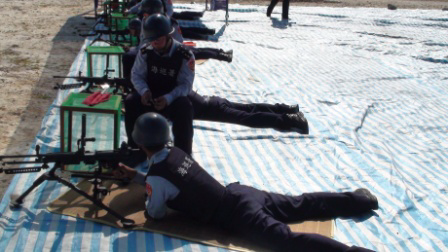
CGA machine gun training

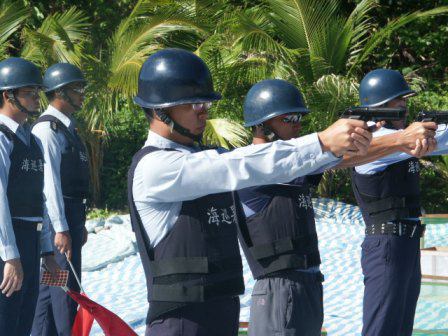
CGA pistol training

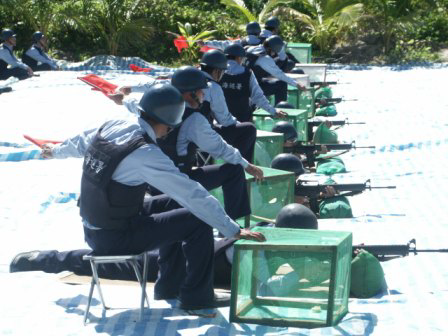
CGA rifle training

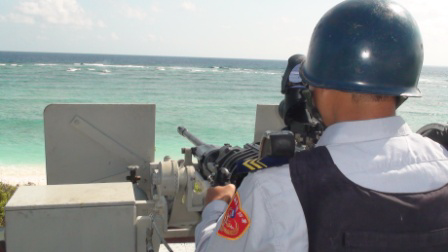
CGA autocannon training
- Kestrel (rocket launcher), for Pratas and Spratley Islands garrisons. 292 deployed by April 2021.

=== Heavy weapons ===
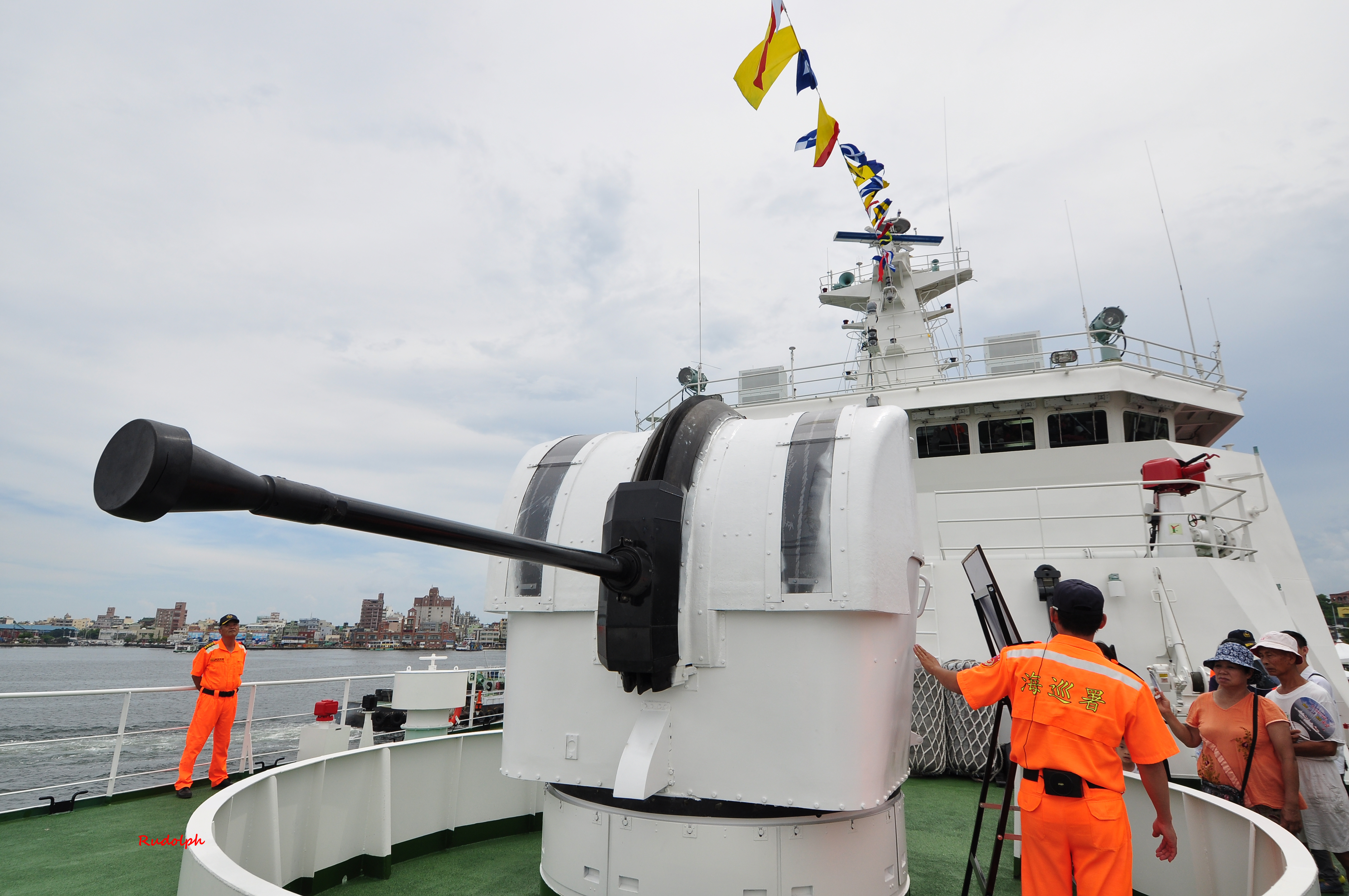
Bofors 40 mm L/70 Automatic Gun

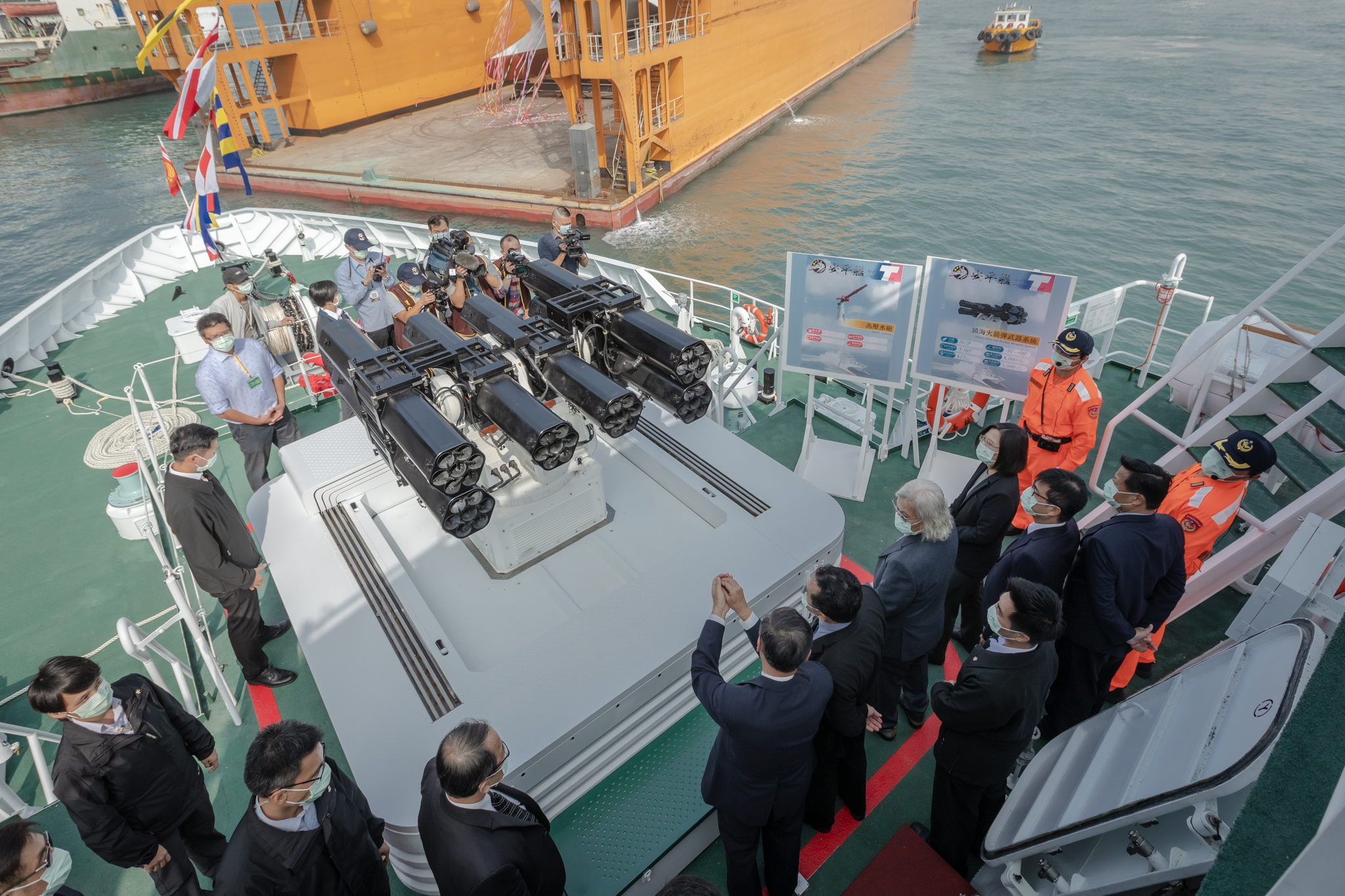
Anping-class offshore patrol vessel onboard multi-barrel Zhenhai rocket system.

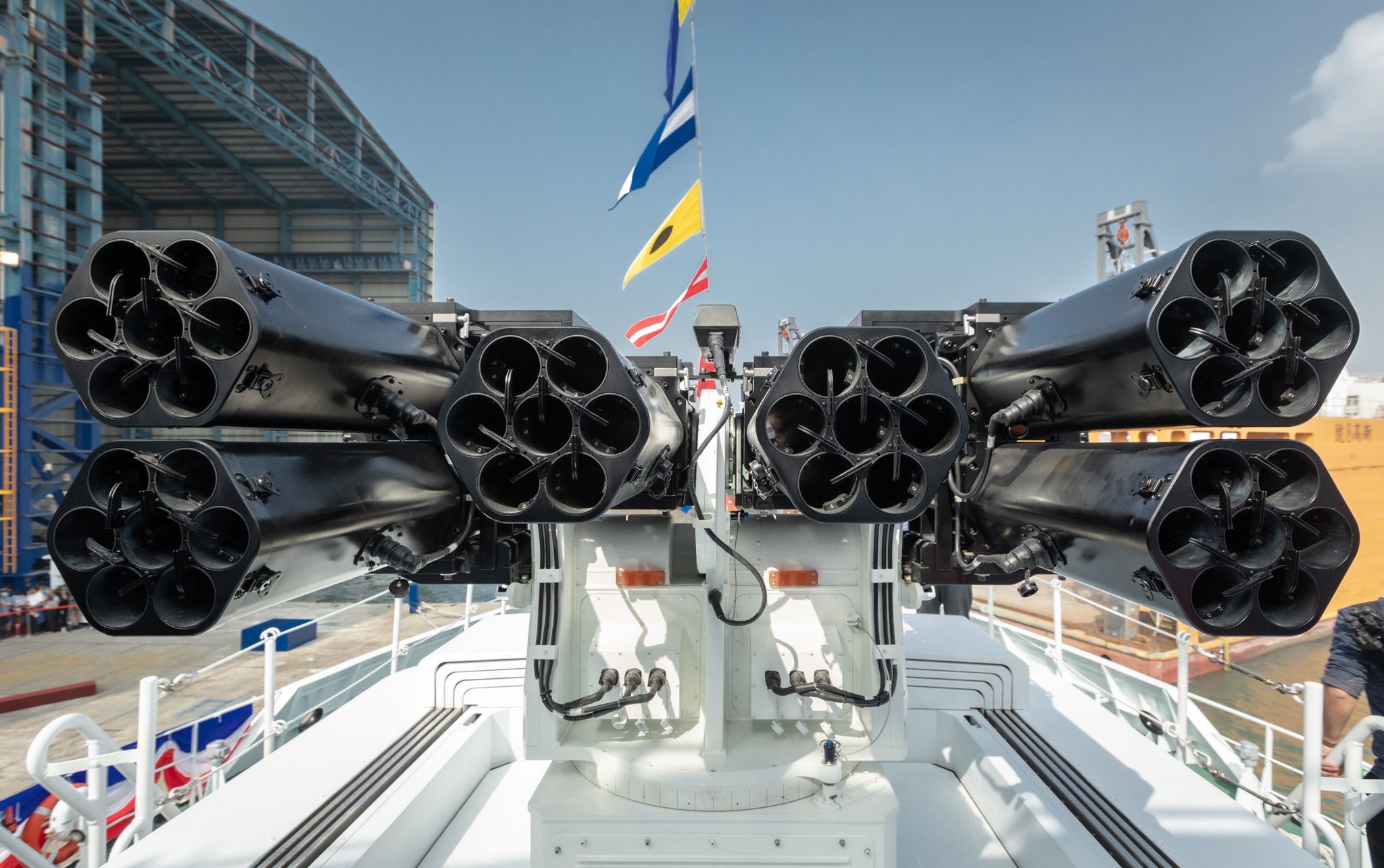
NCSIST 2.75in rockets remote weapon station

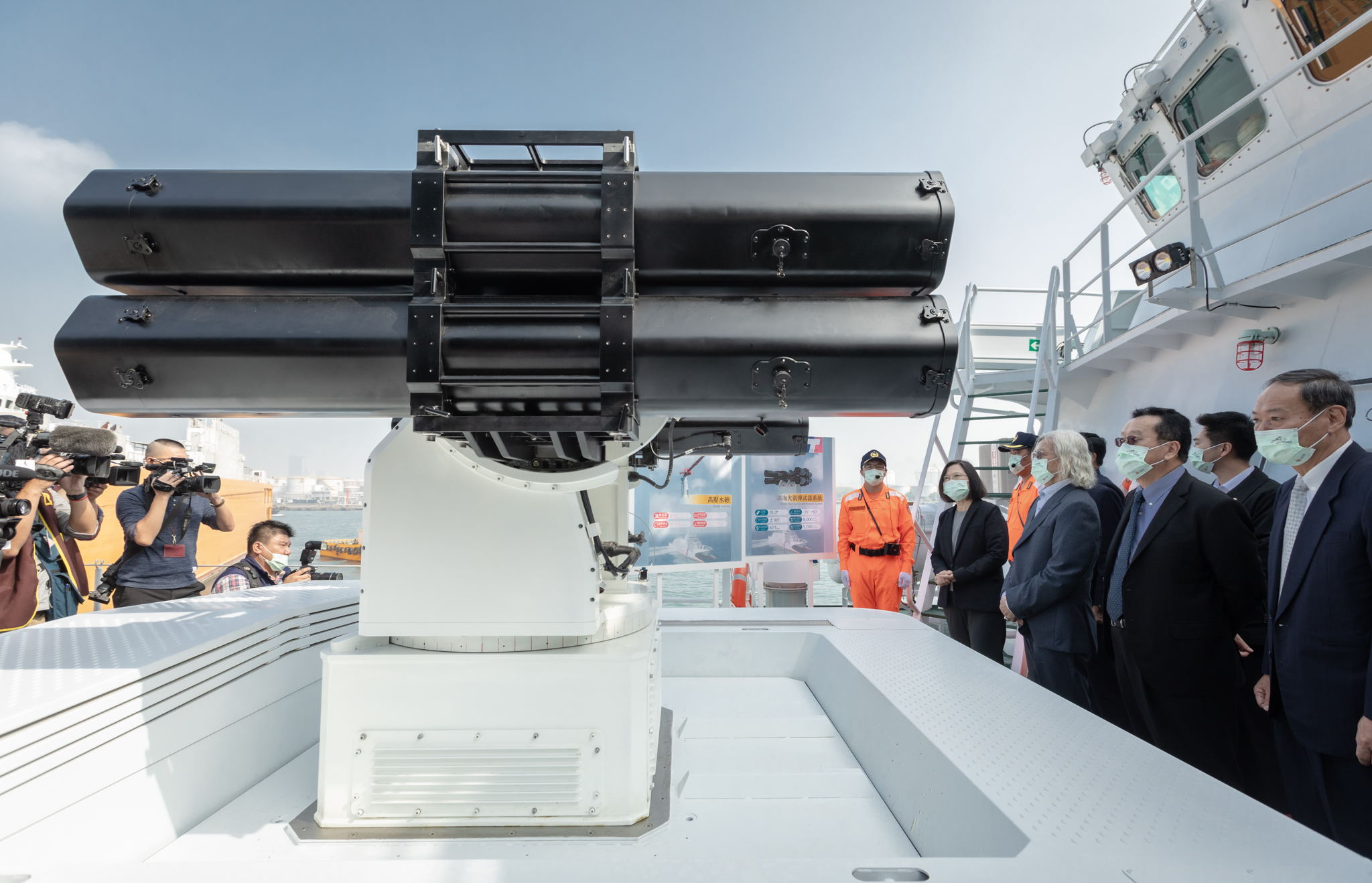
NCSIST 2.75in rockets remote weapon station (side).

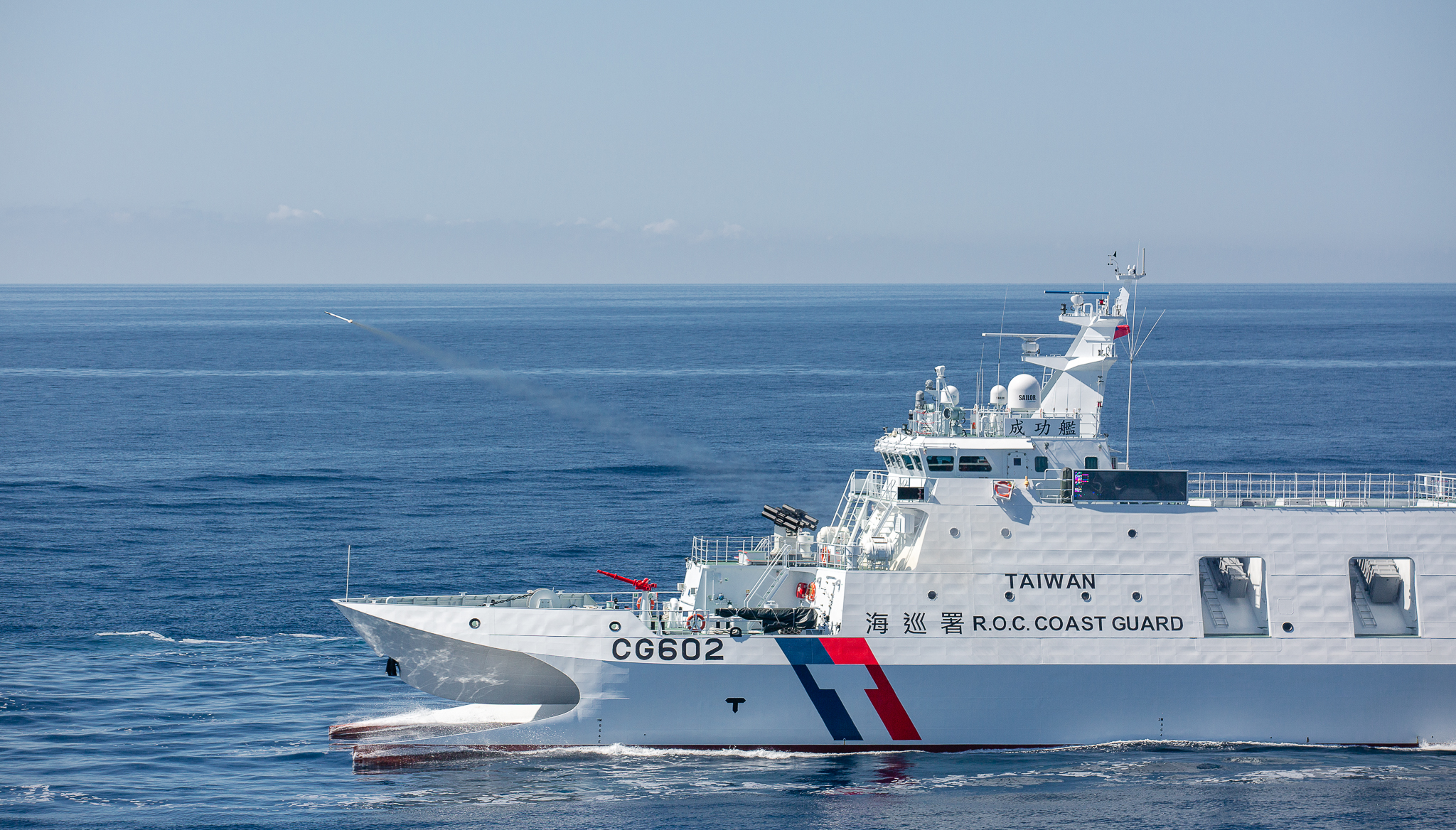
Anping-class offshore patrol vessel Cheng Kung (CG-602) multi-barrel NCSIST 2.75in rockets remote weapon station

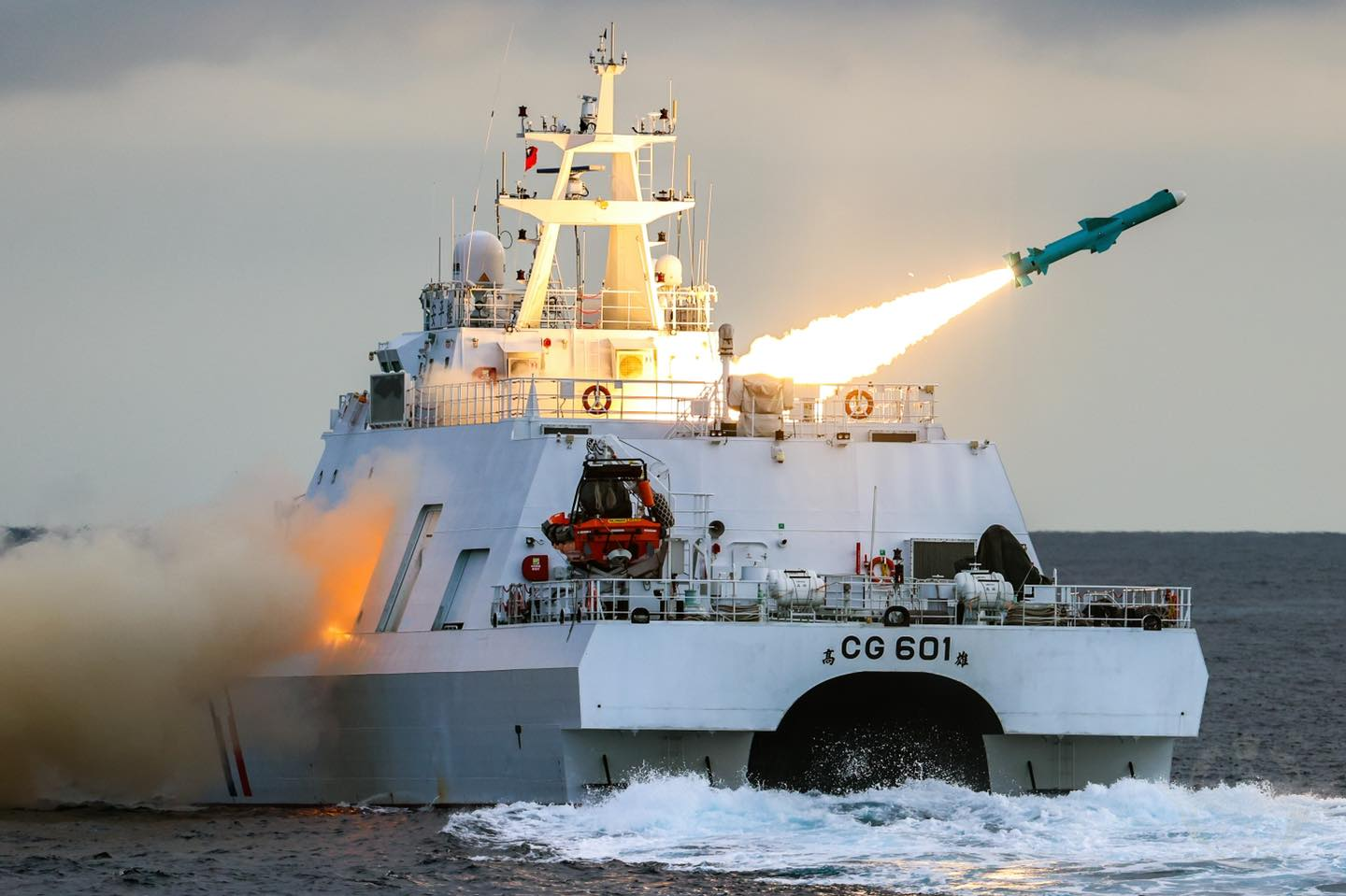
Anping-class offshore patrol vessel Anping (CG-601) launch Hsiung Feng II

=== Ground vehicles ===
- Ford Ranger
- Hyundai Tucson
- Mitsubishi Outlander
- Mitsubishi Fuso Canter
- Toyota Altis
- Toyota Camry
- Toyota Hilux
- Toyota RAV4
- Volkswagen Crafter
CGA Ford Ranger towing assault craft.

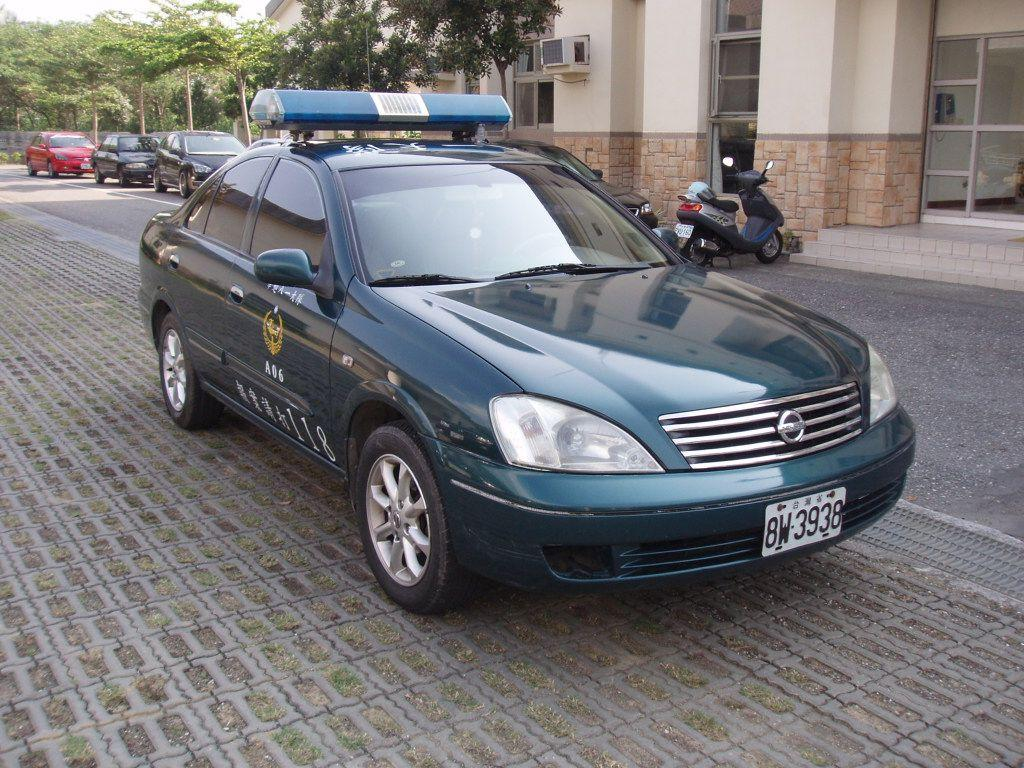
Coast Guard Administration Patrol Car in 2018

=== Coastal surveillance ===
The CGA maintains a comprehensive coastal surveillance network. In 2021 the CGA allocated NT$919.99 million (US$33.33 million) to upgrade its coastal surveillance network and to add new gap filler radars as well as photoelectric sensors to the network.

In 2025 following maritime boarder crossings by small boats and stowaways the Coast Guard Administration cooperated with the National Security Bureau to expand the network and to bring the sort of high tech solutions employed on the offshore islands near China to the main island of Taiwan. Deficiencies in the Coast Guard's coastal surveillance network were criticized by lawmakers who appropriated additional funds to the issue.

== Rank insignia ==
Coast Guard Law Enforcement

Senior Civil Service
Fourteenth Class	Thirteenth Class	Twelfth Class	Eleventh Class	Tenth Class
Vice Admiral		Rear Admiral		Captain

Middle Civil Service
Ninth Class	Eighth Class	Seventh Class	Sixth Class
Commander		Lieutenant Commander	Captain

Junior Civil Service
Fifth Class	Fourth Class	Third Class	Second Class	First Class
Lieutenant; Ensign	Chief Petty Officer	Petty Officer 1st Class	Petty Officer 2nd Class	Petty Officer 3rd Class

Coastguardmen
n/a	n/a	n/a
Seaman Specialist	Seaman 1st Class	Seaman

Coast Guard Navigation and Engineering Officers

The navigation and engineering officers of the Taiwan coast guard cutters are not sworn law-enforcement officers. They wear the following rank insigna.

Navigation Department
Captain	Chief Officer	Second Officer	Third Officer

Engine Department
Chief Engineer	Second Engineer	Third Engineer	Fourth Engineer

== Leaders ==
=== Ministers (CGA under Executive Yuan) ===
No.	Name	Term of Office		Days	Premier
4	Wang Ginn-wang 王進旺	25 January 2006	7 December 2014	3238	Su Tseng-chang; Chang Chun-hsiung II; Liu Chao-shiuan; Wu Den-yih; Sean Chen; Jiang Yi-huah
5	Wang Chung-yi 王崇儀	8 December 2014	19 May 2016	528	Mao Chi-kuo; Chang San-cheng
6	Lee Chung-wei 李仲威	20 May 2016	27 April 2018	3834	Lin Chuan; William Lai; Su Tseng-chang II

=== Chairpersons (CGA under Ocean Affairs Council) ===
No.	Name	Term of Office		Days	Premier
1	Lee Chung-wei 李仲威	28 April 2018	13 February 2019	291	William Lai; Su Tseng-chang II
2	Chen Kuo-en 陳國恩	19 February 2019	1 October 2020	590	Su Tseng-chang II
3	Chuang Ching-ta 莊慶達	1 October 2020	31 December 2020	91	Su Tseng-chang II
4	Chou Mei-wu 周美伍	31 December 2020	May 20, 2024	1236	Su Tseng-chang II; Chen Chien-jen
4	Chang Chung-Lung 張忠龍	May 20, 2024	incumbent	912	Cho Jung-tai

== See also ==
- China Coast Guard
- National Police Agency (Republic of China)
- Maritime industries of Taiwan
- Guang Da Xing No. 28 incident
