= Maritime industries of Taiwan =

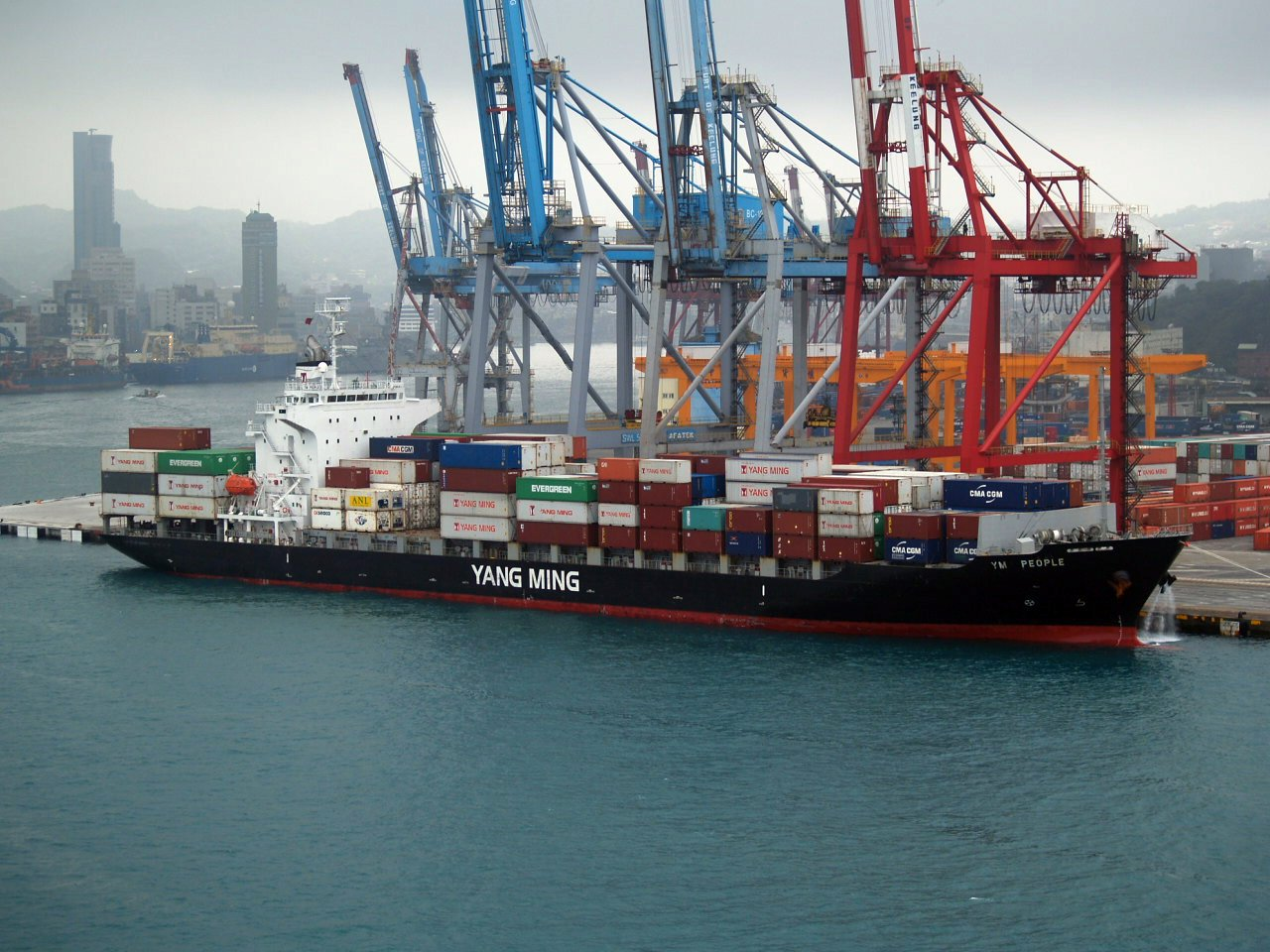
Yang Ming container ship Ym People at Port of Keelung

The maritime industries of Taiwan are a large part of Taiwan's economy. Industries of particular importance are shipbuilding, boat building, maritime transport, aquaculture, mariculture, commercial fishing, seafood processing, offshore wind power and various forms of tourism. Deep sea mining, especially of dormant hydrothermal vents, is also being considered for the future. In 2018 Taiwan was the fourth largest yacht building nation. Taiwan is home to a number of maritime museums and maritime colleges.

== Background ==
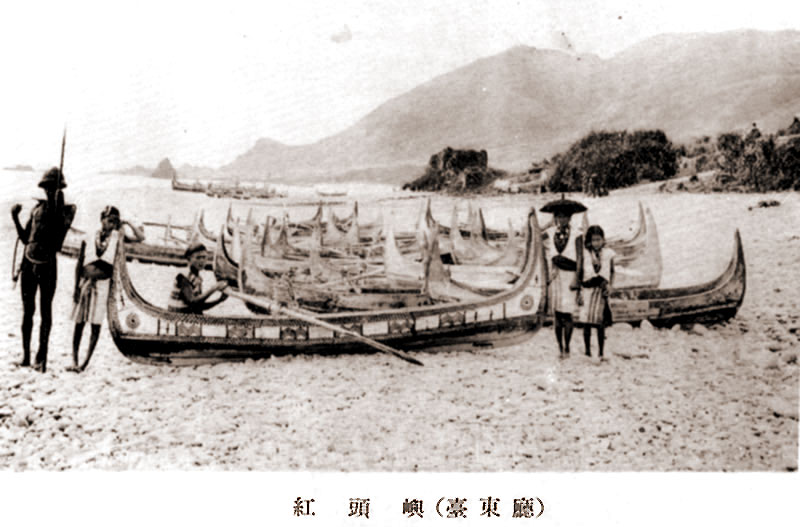
Orchid Island during the Japanese period

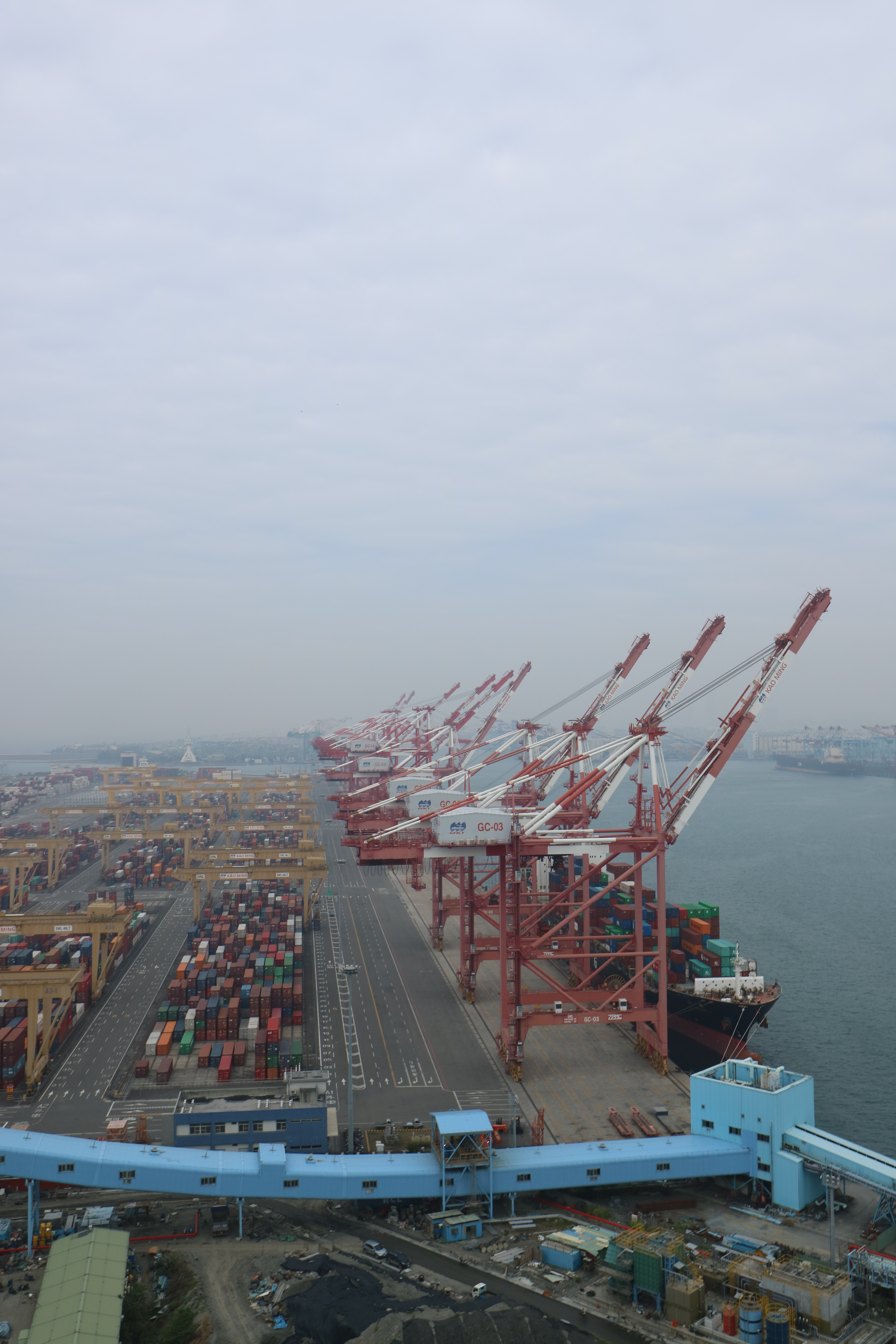
Kaohsiung international container terminal

Taiwan is an island nation and as such has an intimate relationship with the sea. Seafarers from Taiwan are believed to have colonized the Ryukyu Islands 30,000 year ago. The indigenous Yami people of Orchid Island are famous for their seafaring skills and most Taiwanese indigenous people practiced some right or ritual related to the sea. Waves of immigrants and conquerors have traveled to Taiwan over the seas from Mainland China, Europe, Japan, and elsewhere. The people of Taiwan are collectively known as the "Children of the Sea.”

The principle goddess of Chinese folk religion as practiced in Taiwan is the sea goddess Mazu. Her veneration is particularly popular along Taiwan's east coast.

Geographically Taiwan's relationship with the sea is shaped by its location at the eastern end of the Eurasian landmass. The east coast is under the influence of the strong Kuroshio Current. The west coast of Taiwan is muddy with large tidal flats, tides in the west are much stronger than those on the east and as such they have a much greater influence on daily routines.

The Ship and Ocean Industries R&D Center (SOIC), founded in 1976 as the United Ship Design and Development Center (USDDC), plays an important role in supporting Taiwan's maritime industries. SOIC works on commercial, government, and military projects as well as basic scientific research. The Yacht Industry Department of SOIC is the only government supported R&D center for yacht materials and design in the world.

Taiwan's maritime culture suffered under the KMT who nationalized the seashore and closed off access to most Taiwanese as well as forbade private recreational boat ownership. This led to an extreme disconnect between the island nation and the waters which surround it. As late as 2010 half of all Taiwanese did not know how to swim. Since the end of the martial law period the Taiwanese people have embarked on a process of re-embracing their maritime culture.

== Sea transport ==
As of 2009 90% of Taiwan's trade was seaborne. Evergreen Marine and Yang Ming Marine Transport Corporation are two major ocean shipping companies based in Taiwan. Wan Hai Lines and Today Makes Tomorrow are smaller but still globally significant ocean shipping companies. In 2016 amid a global downturn in the shipping industry the Taiwanese government spent $1.9B to support the domestic shipping industry.

As of 2019 Taiwan had the 11th largest national shipping capacity by deadweight tons.

=== Ports ===
Taiwan's main ports the Port of Taipei, Port of Keelung, and Port of Kaohsiung. Most of the nation's large ports are managed by Taiwan International Ports Corporation which is a state-owned enterprise.

== Shipbuilding ==
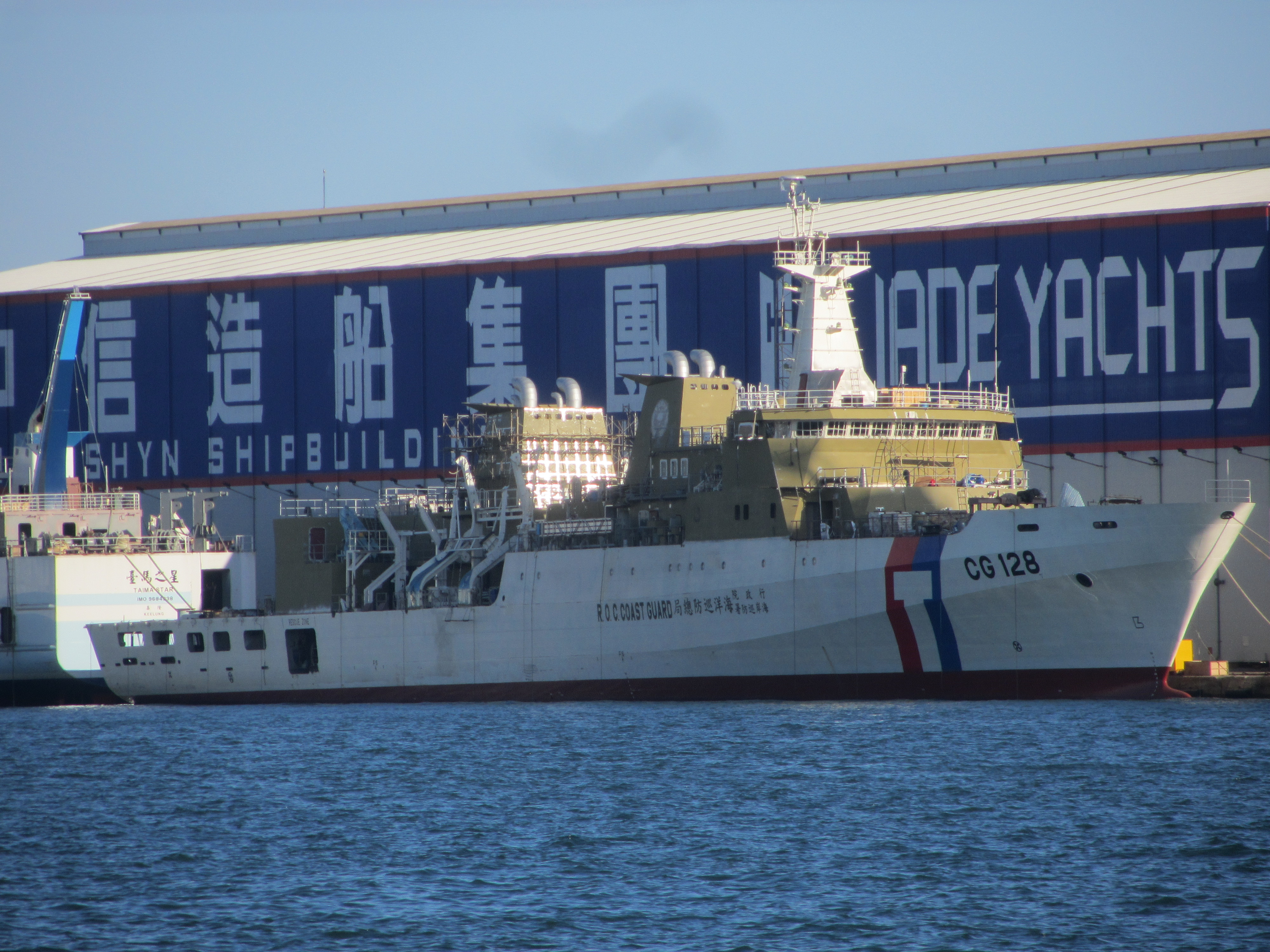
Yilan (CG128) under construction at Jong Shyn Shipbuilding Company

The modern shipbuilding industry of Taiwan began in 1948 when the Government established the Taiwan Shipbuilding Corporation (TSBC) in Keelung. In 1957 the US based Ingalls Shipbuilding Corporation established the Ingalls Taiwan Shipbuilding and Drydock Company, which subsequently rented the TSBC shipyard and produced 14 vessels between 1957 and 1962. The Government prioritized shipbuilding as one of the core industries of the economy, in 1973 they established the China Shipbuilding Corporation which was merged with TSBC in 1978. In 2008 the ship- and boat-building industry had a production value of 2.09b USD with CSBC accounting for 54% of production, small and medium yards 22% and yacht builders 16%.

As of 2009 there were 116 shipyards (including 34 yacht builders) and 10 marine equipment companies in Taiwan. Major shipyards include CSBC Corporation, Taiwan, Jong Shyn Shipbuilding Company, and Lungteh Shipbuilding. Military and Coast Guard orders make up a large portion of shipbuilders books by dollar value. Between the Taiwanese Navy and the Coast Guard Administration Taiwan spends approximately a billion dollars a year on new vessel construction.

=== Boat building ===
Karmin International has supplied boats to the Taiwanese Navy and Coast Guard, as well as export customers, including the Republic of the Marshall Islands, Palau, Nauru, and Tuvalu.

A number of Taiwanese companies are engaged in the development of uncrewed surface vehicles. Taiwanese uncrewed surface vehicle manufacturers include NCSIST, Thunder Tiger, CSBC Corporation Taiwan, Carbon-based Technology, Lungteh Shipbuilding, and Corum International.

=== Yacht building ===
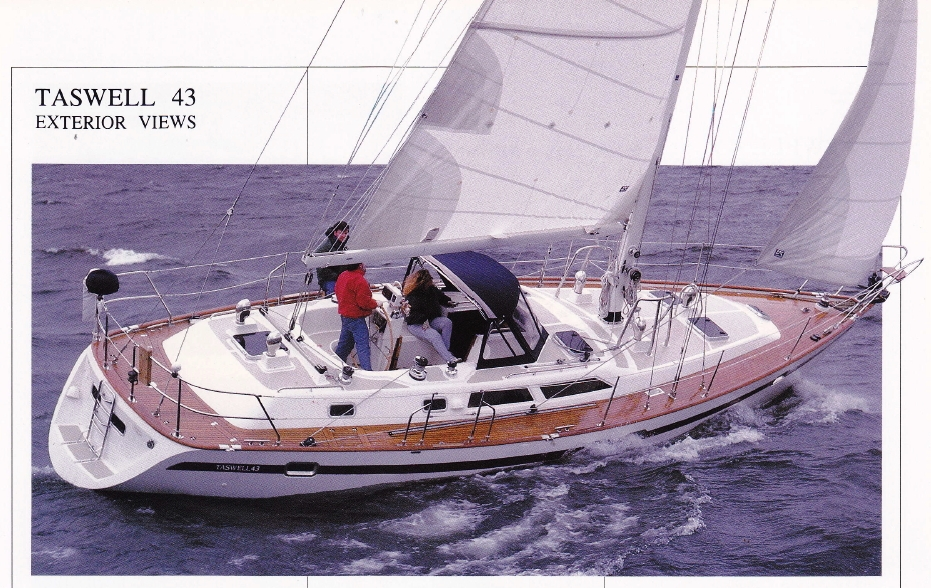
Taswell center cockpit

One third of new yachts sold in the US between 1977 and 1981 were made in Taiwan. In 1987 Taiwan exported 1,755 vessels worth US$190.8 million to the US. During this era more than 100 shipyards and boatbuilders in Taiwan built craft for the export market. Between 1986 and 1992 the New Taiwan Dollar appreciated 58% against the US Dollar which made Taiwanese built yachts significantly less competitive in the US market. By 1994 dozens of yacht and boat builders had gone out of business or been acquired by competitors. Sales recovered but fell again after the Great Recession before strengthening again.

In 2017 Taiwan exported one hundred and sixty two yachts. In 2018 Taiwan was the fourth largest yacht building nation by feet of yacht built after Italy, The Netherlands and Turkey. Major yacht and boat builders include Horizon Yachts, Ocean Alexander, Johnson Yachts, Jade Yachts, and Ta Shing Yacht Building. Taiwan remained fourth in the world through 2021.

== Maritime recreation ==
Regulations enacted during the martial law era meant that ownership of personal leisure craft was not permitted until 2010. While maritime recreation facilities and infrastructure remain underdeveloped the Taiwanese government has emphasized marine sports and related tourism as an economic opportunity for Taiwan's outlying islands.

The development of Taiwan's domestic yachting industry has been led by its domestic yacht manufacturers with Kha Shing and Horizon building marinas with associated repair/refit facilities.

== Aquaculture ==
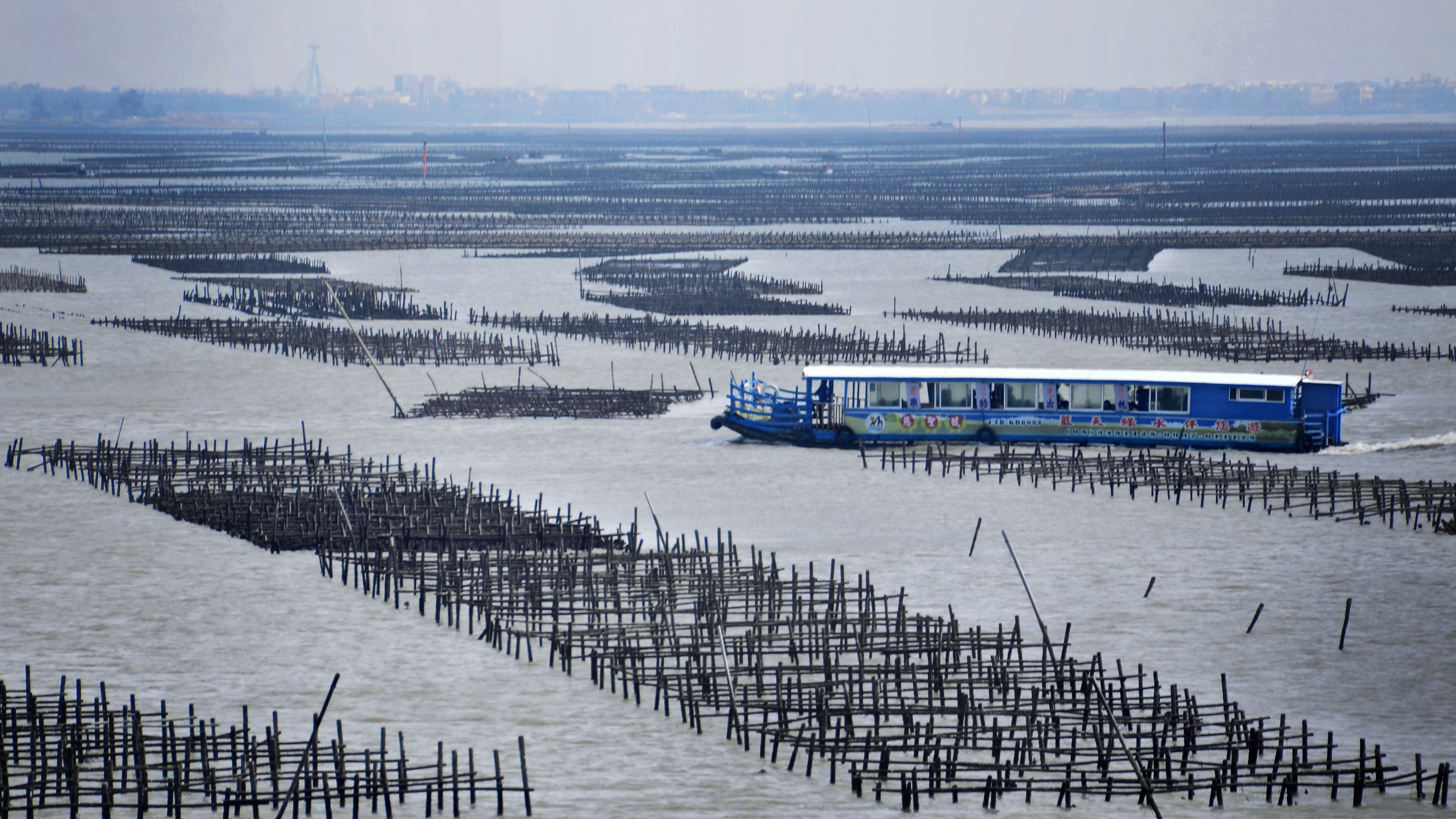
Oyster Trellis at Dongshi fishing harbour, Chiayi County

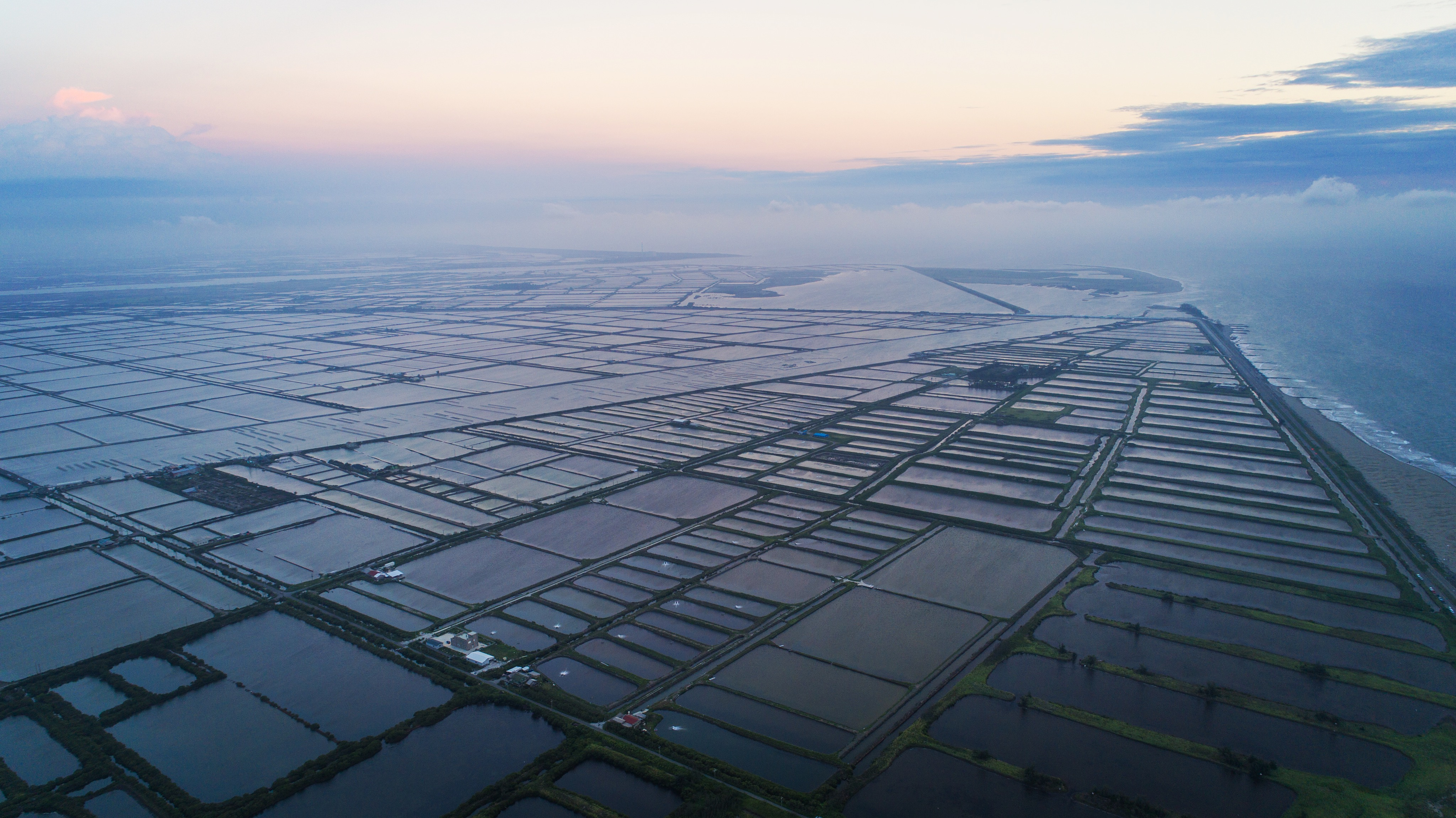
Fish farms in Cigu District, Tainan

Aquaculture has a long history in Taiwan. By 2006 the production of Taiwanese coastal aquaculture was valued at NT$11,817 million. In the 21st century high technology is playing a greater part in Taiwan's aquaculture industry as the industry struggles to cope with labor shortages and fierce foreign competition. The Taiwanese government operates six fisheries and aquaculture research centers.

The Aquaculture Taiwan Expo & Forum is the primary aquaculture trade show in Taiwan, it is held concurrently with the Livestock Taiwan Expo & Forum and the Asia Agri-Tech Expo & Forum.

The Taiwanese scientist Liao I-chiu is known as the "Father of Shrimp Farming,” having pioneered many of the techniques and overcome many of the technical hurdles which allowed the creation of the modern global shrimp farming industry. The giant river prawn is widely cultivated in Taiwan. In 2012 Taiwan produced 3% of world production.

Milkfish is one of Taiwan's most commercially important fish, yearly production is 50,000 tons of milkfish valued at $4.1 billion New Taiwan Dollars. Consumption and ranching of milkfish in Taiwan dates back hundreds of years.

The Taiwanese ornamental fish and shrimp industry is significant with more than 250 commercial operations, ~200 of them with operations in Pingtung County. Taiwan was once known as the “cichlid kingdom” for its specialization in cichlids, a fad which culminated in the breeding of the blood parrot cichlid in 1986. The fields of biotechnology and applied ecology are playing an ever increasing role in the Taiwanese aquarium sector.

== Fisheries ==
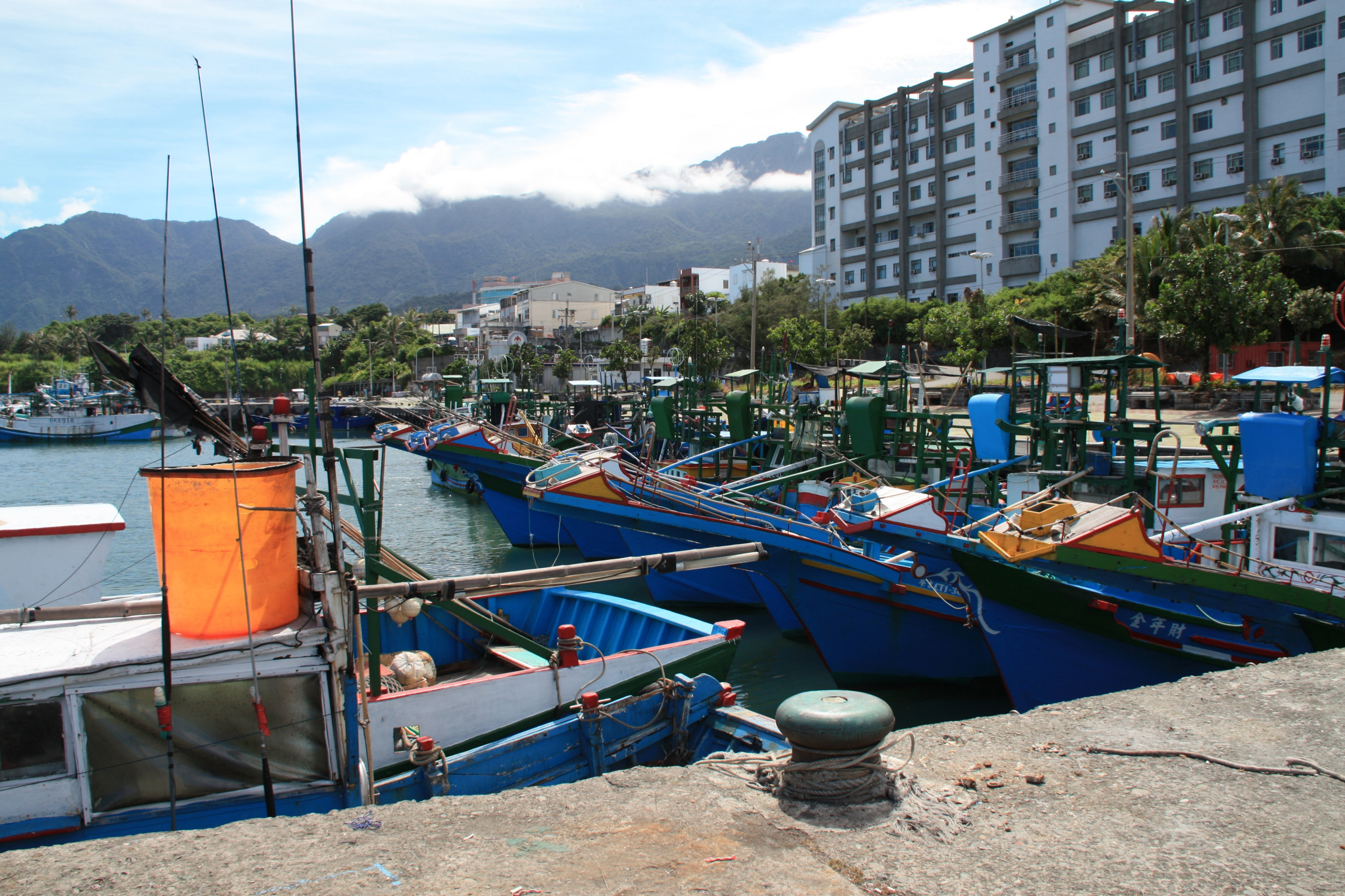
Chenggong Fishing Harbor in 2010

With a coastline of 1566 km, Taiwan is one of the largest fishing nations on earth. Geographically, Taiwan is surrounded by water and lies about 180 kilometres (112 miles) across the Taiwan Strait from the southeastern coast of the Mainland China. The East China Sea is to the north of the island, the Philippine Sea to its east, the Luzon Strait directly to its south, and the South China Sea to its southwest. It also controls a number of smaller islands, including the Penghu archipelago in the Taiwan Strait, Kinmen and Matsu in Fuchien near the Mainland coast, as well as Pratas and Taiping in the South China Sea.

More than one third of the worlds longline tuna fishing vessels are operated by Taiwanese companies with the total strength of the distant waters fishing fleet at more than 2,000 vessels. Taiwanese conglomerate FCF Co, Ltd. is one of the largest tuna traders in the world moving more than half million tons a year, in 2019 they acquired American company Bumble Bee Foods for close to 1 billion dollars. Taiwan's ocean fisheries employs roughly 350,000 people and there are 130,000 fishing households in Taiwan. The Taiwanese fishing industry was estimated to be worth approximately two billion dollars in 2019, and the seafood industry to be worth 1.3 billion dollars a year in 2020.

== Offshore wind power ==
The first offshore wind farms in Taiwan, Formosa 1 Offshore Wind Farm, started its commercial operation in April 2017 at off the coast of Miaoli County. The Formosa II wind farms will be constructed also offshore Miaoli County with a planned capacity of 300-500 MW. The Formosa III wind farm will be constructed offshore Changhua County with a planned capacity of 1,900 MW. Taiwan has one of the fastest growing offshore wind power industries in the world. As of 2020, there were 361 onshore turbines and 22 offshore turbines in operation with the total installed capacity of 845.2 MW.

== Maritime museums ==
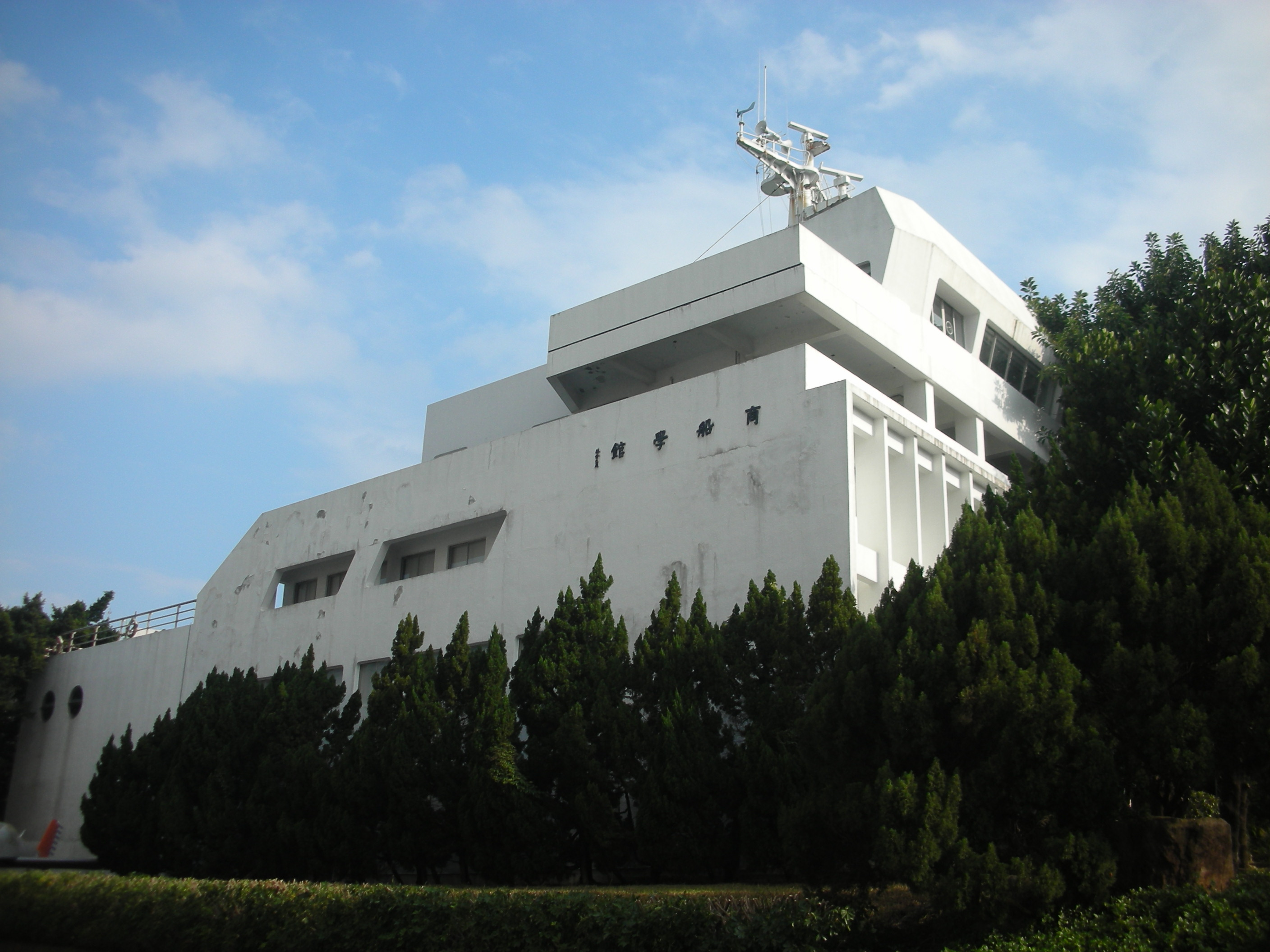
Tamkang University Maritime Museum

- Evergreen Maritime Museum
- Ocean Resources Museum
- Tamkang University Maritime Museum
- YM Museum of Marine Exploration Kaohsiung
- YM Oceanic Culture and Art Museum
- National Museum of Natural Science

== Maritime education ==
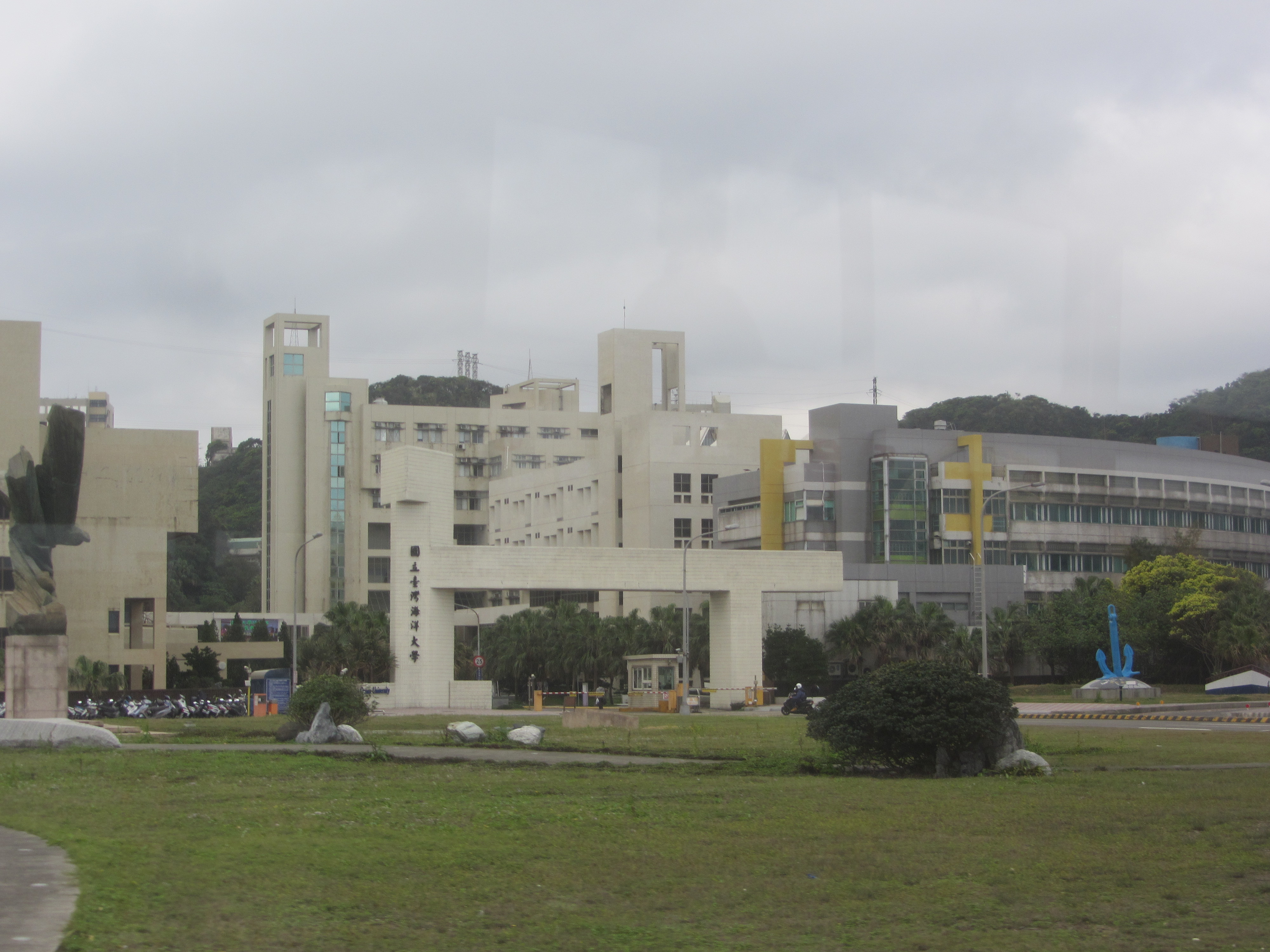
National Taiwan Ocean University

In 2007 the Ministry of Education released the Marine Education Policy, the first education policy document with a maritime focus. As of 2014 marine and maritime education at the primary and secondary level had been greatly expanded with each of Taiwan's 22 counties, special municipalities and cities establishing a marine education center at either an elementary or high school. Within nationwide science curriculums the portion of marine centered content has been increased. Marine issues are also taught to 9th graders nationwide as part of a curriculum on oceans and climate change.

=== Maritime colleges ===
- National Taiwan Ocean University
- Taipei University of Marine Technology

== See also ==
- Maritime and Port Bureau
- Ocean Affairs Council
- Taiwan Ocean Research Institute
- Sinking of Chian-der 3
- Defense industry of Taiwan
