= Jong Shyn Shipbuilding Company =

Shipbuilder based in Kaohsiung, Taiwan

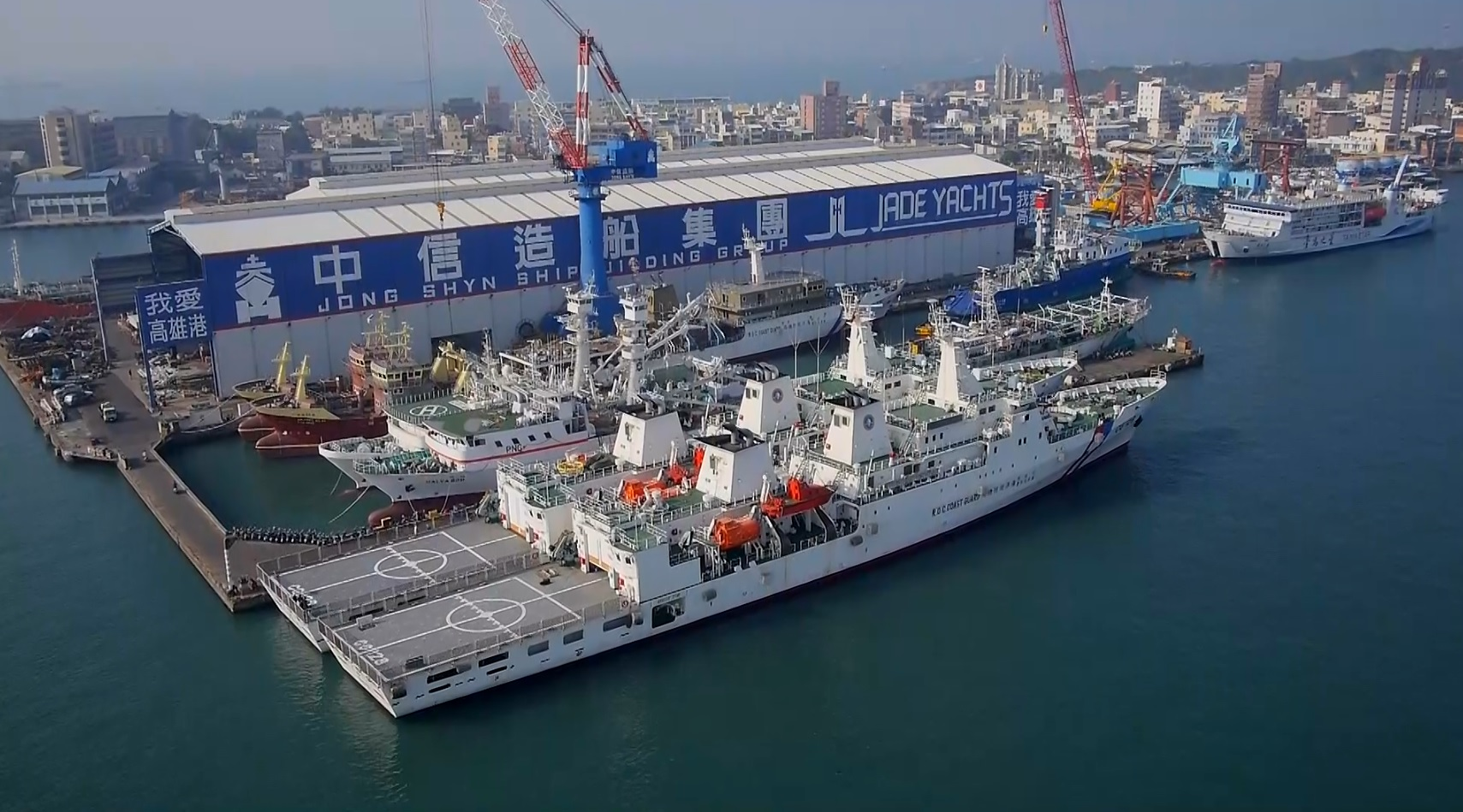
- Jong Shyn Shipbuilding Group shipyard in Kaohsiung in 2017
- Native name: 中信造船集團
- Company type: Private
- Industry: Shipbuilding
- Founded: 1973; 53 years ago
- Founder: Pi-Hsiang Han 韓碧祥
- Headquarters: Kaohsiung, Taiwan
- Key people: Han Pi-hsiang, Chairman
- Subsidiaries: Jade Yachts
- Website: http://www.jongshyn.com

Jong Shyn Shipbuilding Company
- Traditional Chinese: 中信造船集團
- Simplified Chinese: 中信造船集团
Transcriptions
Standard Mandarin
- Hanyu Pinyin: Zhōngxìn Zàochuán Jítuán

Alternative Chinese name
- Chinese: 中信
Transcriptions
Standard Mandarin
- Hanyu Pinyin: Zhōngxìn

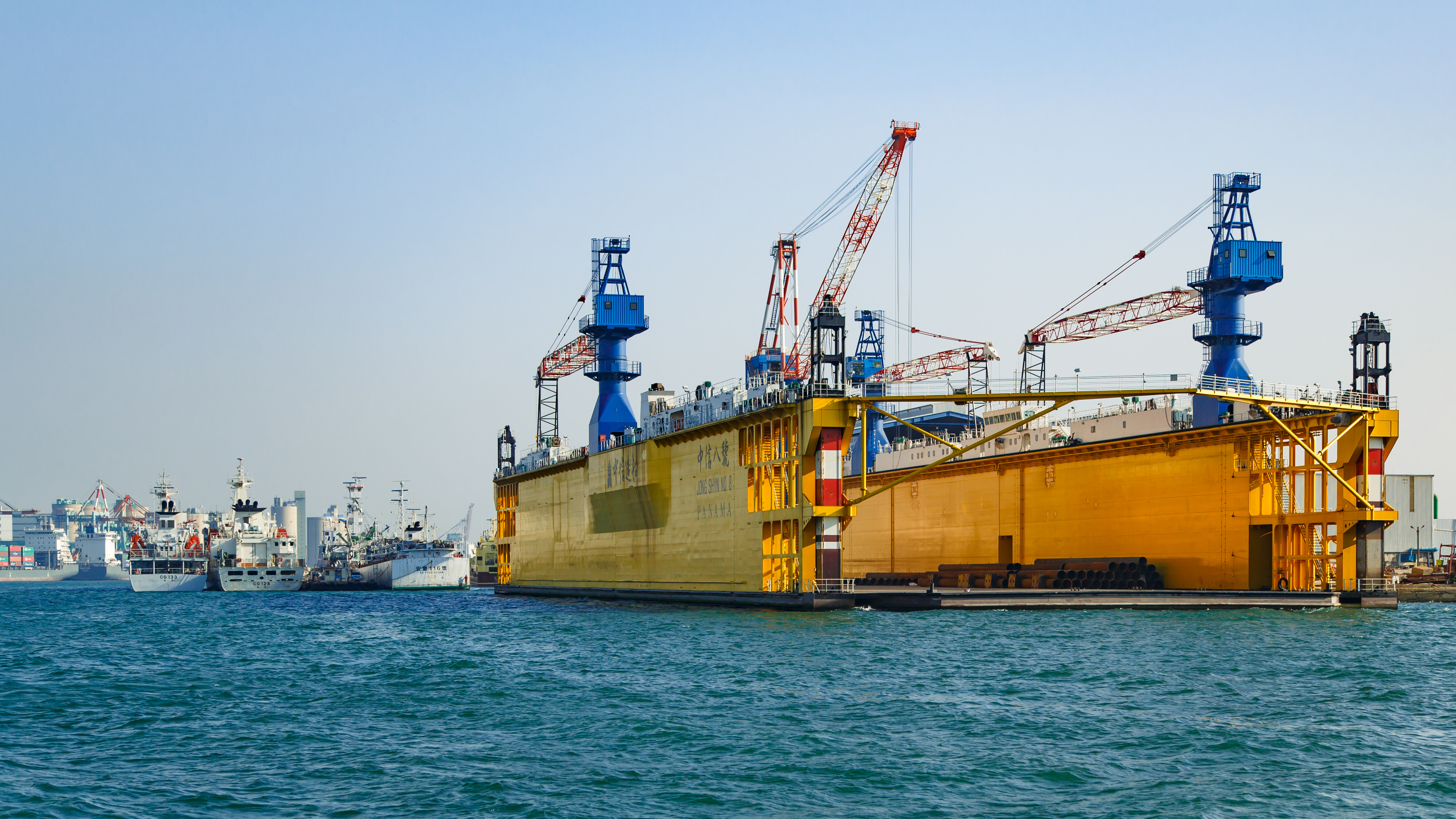
Floating Drydock Jong Shyn No. 8

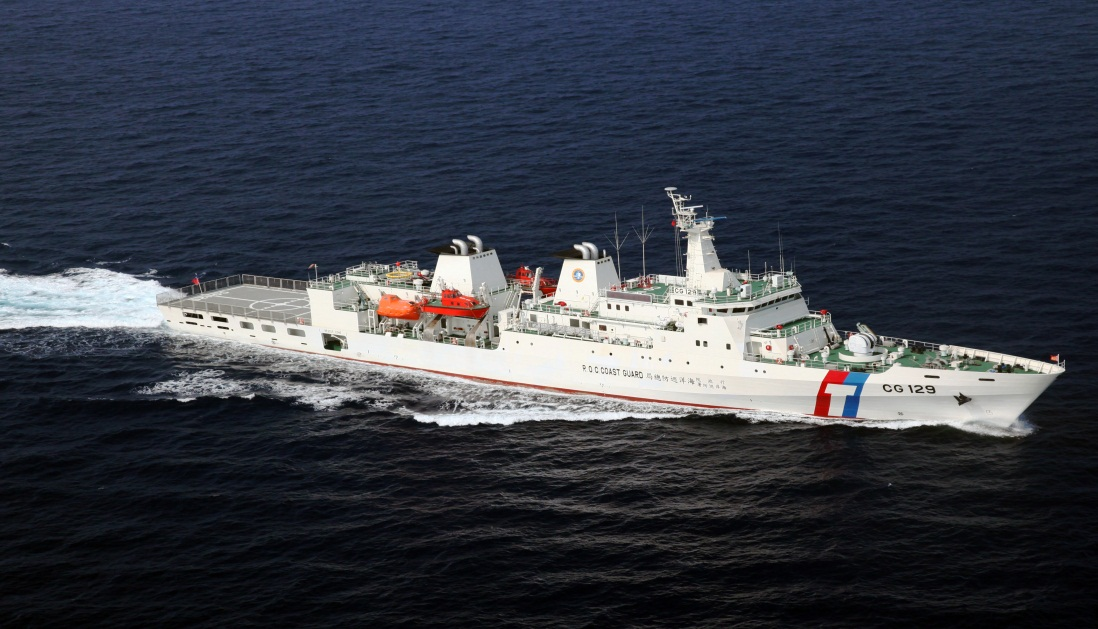
Kaohsiung (CG129), 3000-ton patrol vessel built for Coast Guard Administration

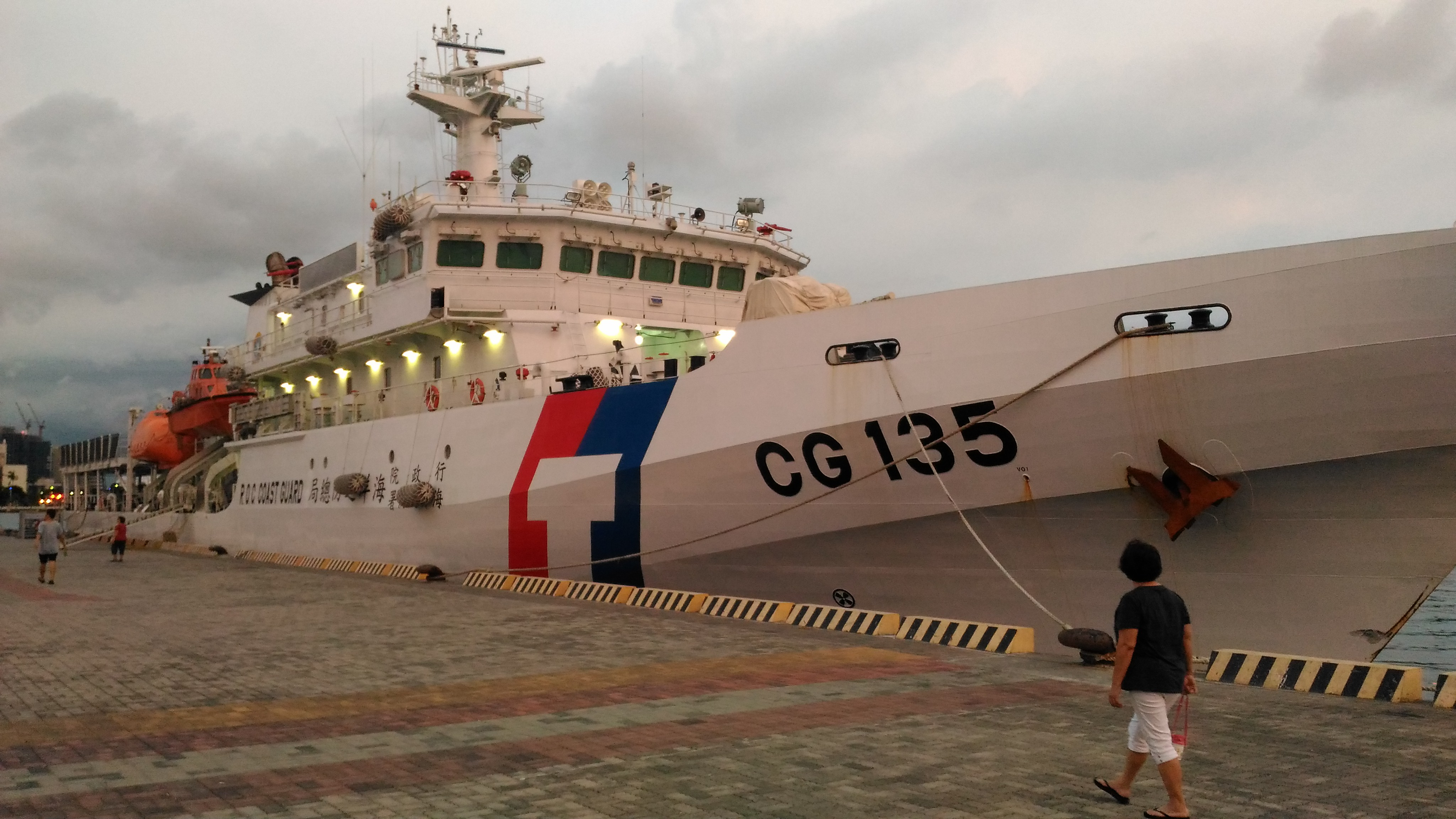
Pingtung CG135, 1000-ton patrol vessel built for Coast Guard Administration

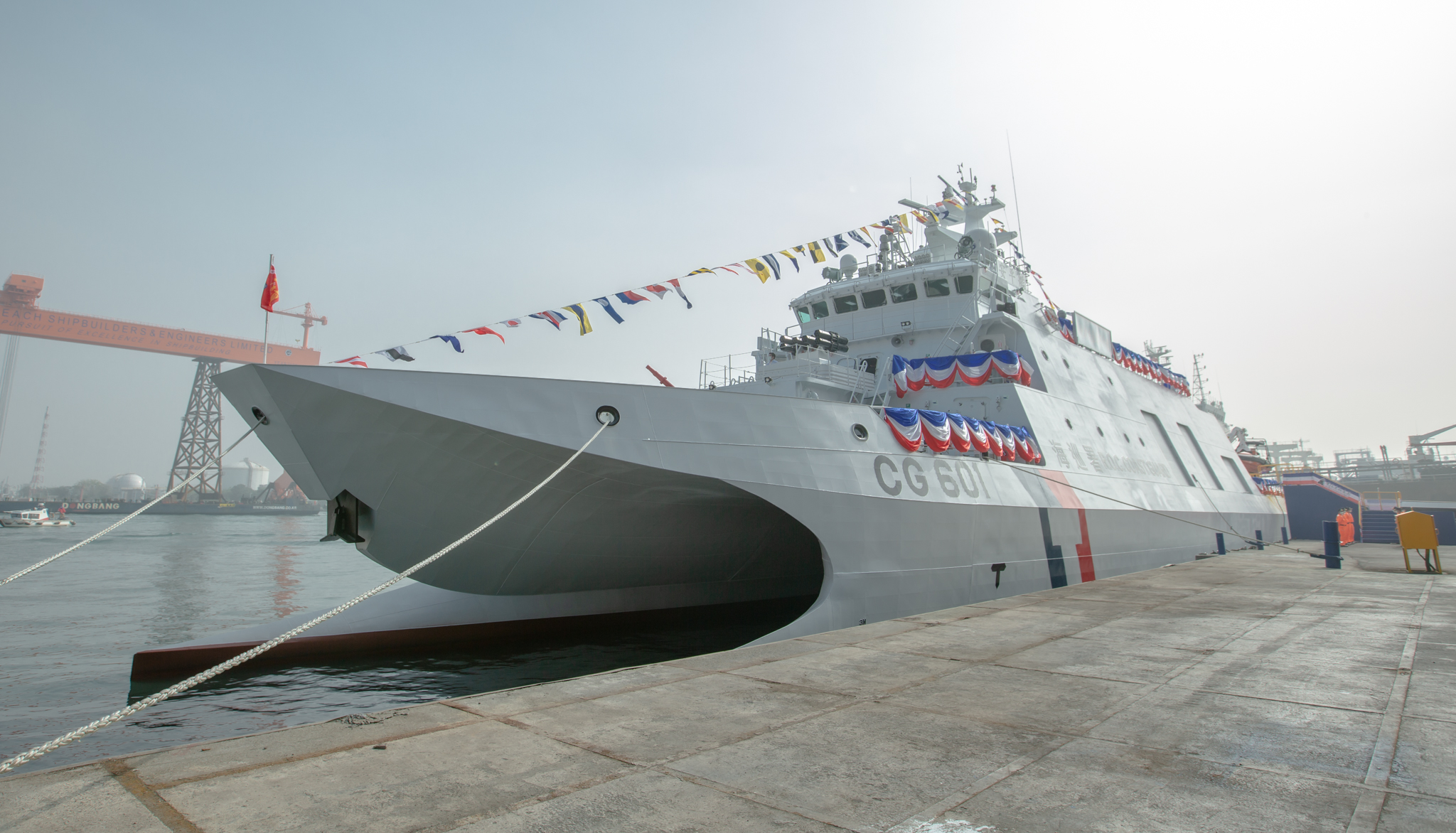
Anping-class offshore patrol vessel

Jong Shyn Shipbuilding Company (JSSC) is a Taiwanese shipbuilder based in Kaohsiung, Taiwan. It is the largest private shipbuilder in Taiwan.

== History ==
Jong Shyn Shipbuilding Company was founded in 1973. By 2009 they had built more than 400 ships. In 2009 JSSC received orders for more than twenty ships between 500-tons and 2,000-tons from the Coast Guard Administration (Taiwan) (CGA). In 2015 JSSC launched two 3,000-ton patrol ships for the CGA, the Yilan (CG 128) and Kaohsiung (CG 129). JSSC is participating in the development of a Taiwanese domestic AUV.

They have delivered Taiwan's first locally designed and built drilling vessel. The Polaris Australis was delivered to Dragon Prince Hydro-Survey Enterprise Co and Dragon Prince in 2017. She has been chartered by Copenhagen Infrastructure Partners to install underwater power cables for their offshore wind farms.

In 2019 Jong Shyn began the construction on the first of twelve 600-ton catamaran patrol vessels ordered by the Coast Guard Administration. Known as the Anping-class offshore patrol vessel the patrol vessels are based on the 567-ton Tuo Chiang-class corvette. The contract to build the 12 600-ton patrol vessels and 52 35-ton patrol vessels for the CGA was worth NTD 17b (USD ~550m). The first 600-ton patrol vessel and first two 35-ton patrol vessels were launched in December 2019.

In 2023 Jong Shyn won a Taiwanese military contract to build two prototype light frigates, one specialized for anti-air warfare and one specialized for anti-submarine warfare.

In July 2025 China placed Jong Shyn on an export control list due to its work for the Taiwanese military.

=== Jade Yachts ===
Jade Yachts is a JSSC subsidiary founded in 2004 to build steel and aluminum yachts for the domestic and international market.

== See also ==
- List of companies of Taiwan
- Maritime industries of Taiwan
- Defense industry of Taiwan
- CSBC Corporation, Taiwan
- Lungteh Shipbuilding
- Coast Guard Administration (Taiwan)
