= Johnson Yachts =

Taiwanese shipbuilder

- Company type: Private company
- Industry: Luxury goods, maritime, industrial
- Founded: 1987; 39 years ago
- Headquarters: Kaohsiung, Taiwan
- Key people: John Huang, Andy Huang
- Products: Yacht manufacturing
- Number of employees: 350
- Website: https://www.johnson-yachts.com

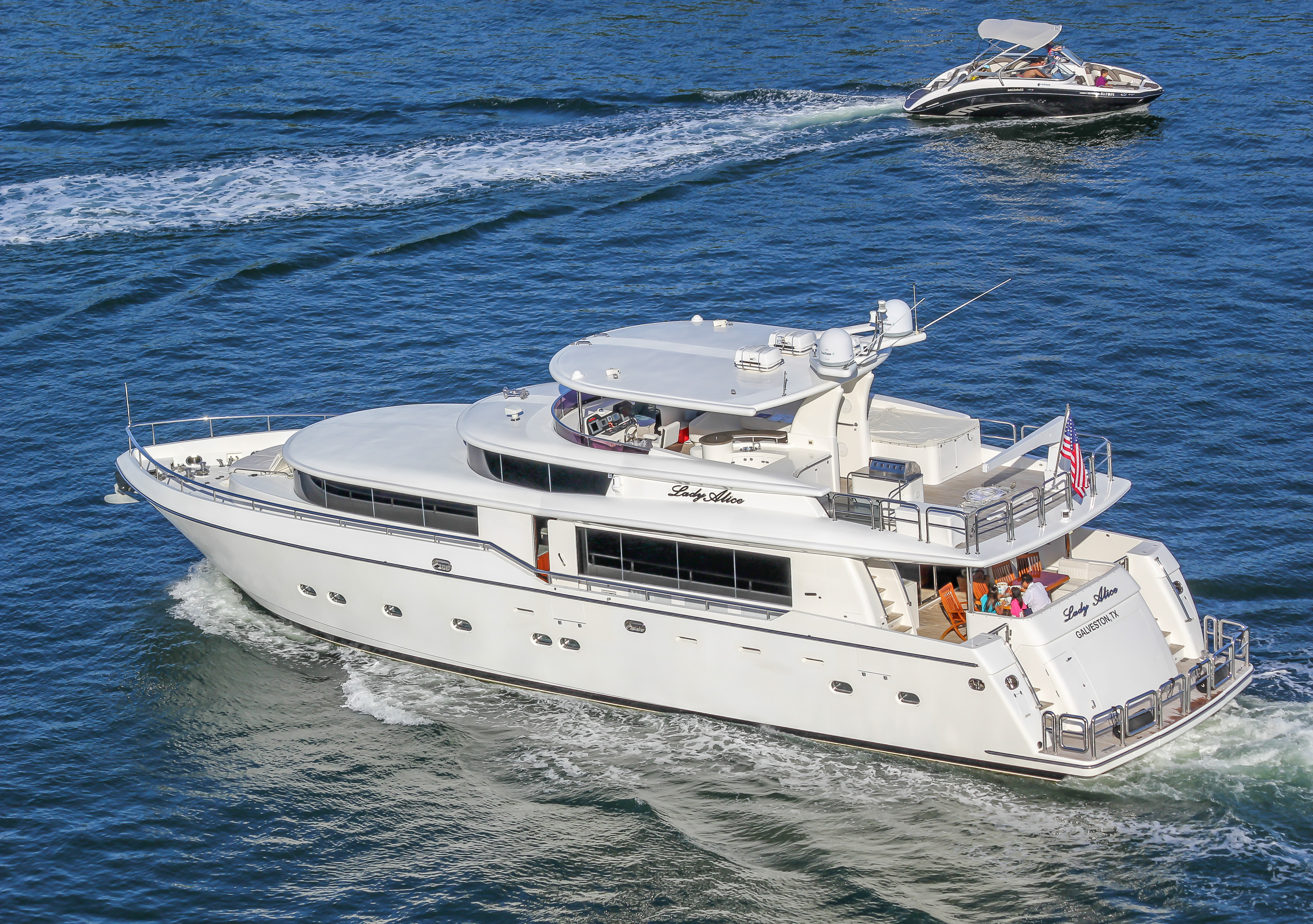
Lady Alice

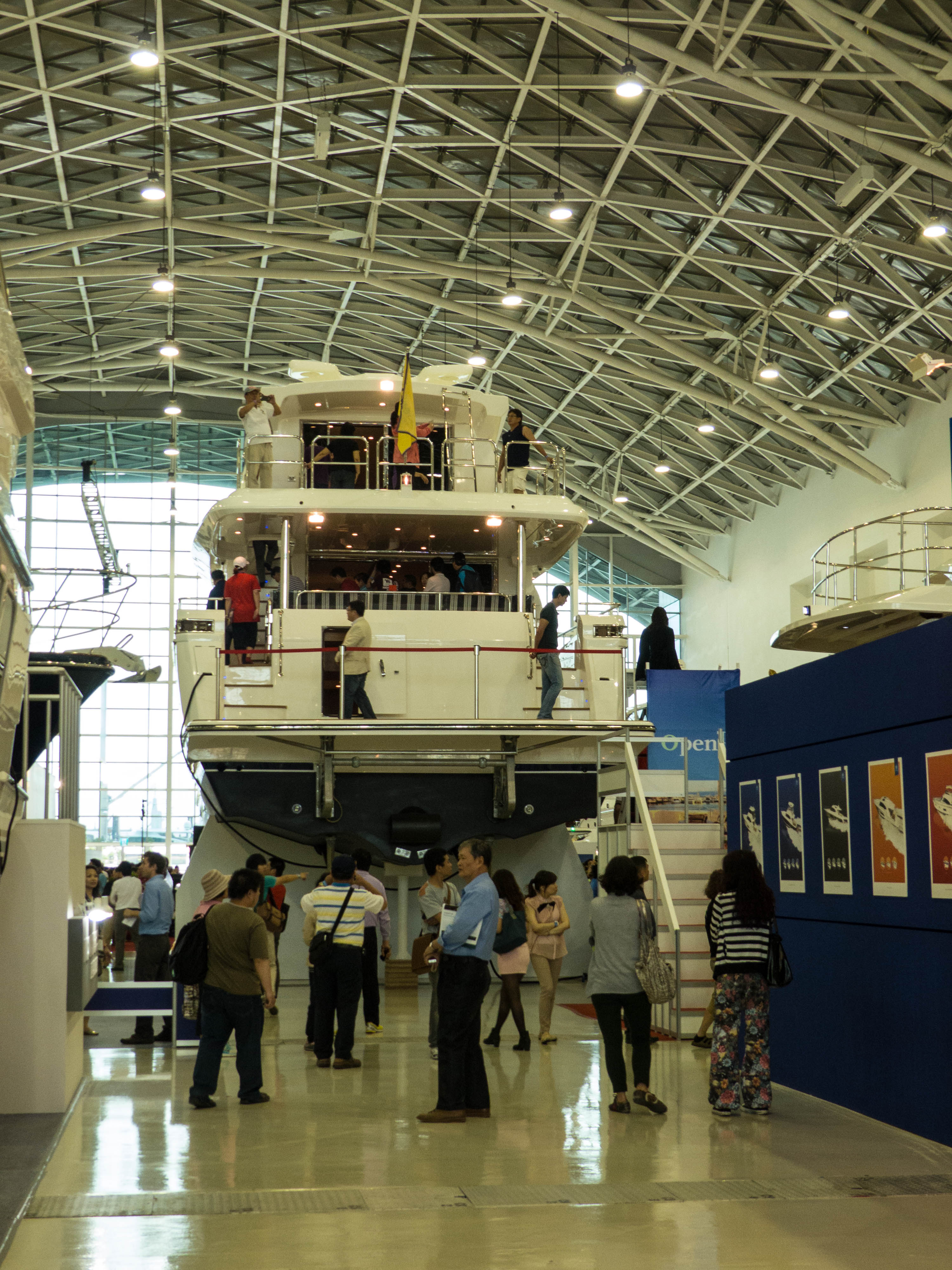
TIBS South Hall Johnson Yacht Co., Ltd.

The Johnson Yachts is a Taiwanese yacht manufacturer based in Kaohsiung, Taiwan.

== History ==
Johnson Yachts was founded in 1987 by John Huang, as of 2019 they have completed more than 350 yachts. Most Johnsons are operated by US owners in US waters.

== Yachts ==
The first Johnson 93 was released in 2018. It was designed in collaboration with Dixon Yacht Design.

The ninth Johnson 80 motor yacht was launched in 2019.

The first 110 Skylounge was launched in 2019.

In 2019, the shipyard presented the Johnson 115, designed by Dixon Yacht Design and Design Unlimited.

== See also ==
- List of companies of Taiwan
- Maritime industries of Taiwan
- Jade Yachts
- Horizon Yachts
- Ocean Alexander
