= Jade Yachts =

Taiwanese yacht manufacturer

- Type: Private company
- Industry: Luxury goods, maritime, industrial
- Founded: 2004; 22 years ago
- Headquarters: Kaohsiung, Taiwan
- Key people: Han Pi-hsiang, Memphis Han
- Products: Yachts
- Website: http://www.jade-yachts.com

Jade Yachts is a Taiwanese yacht manufacturer headquartered in Kaohsiung, Taiwan. It is a subsidiary of the Jong Shyn Shipbuilding Company.

== History ==
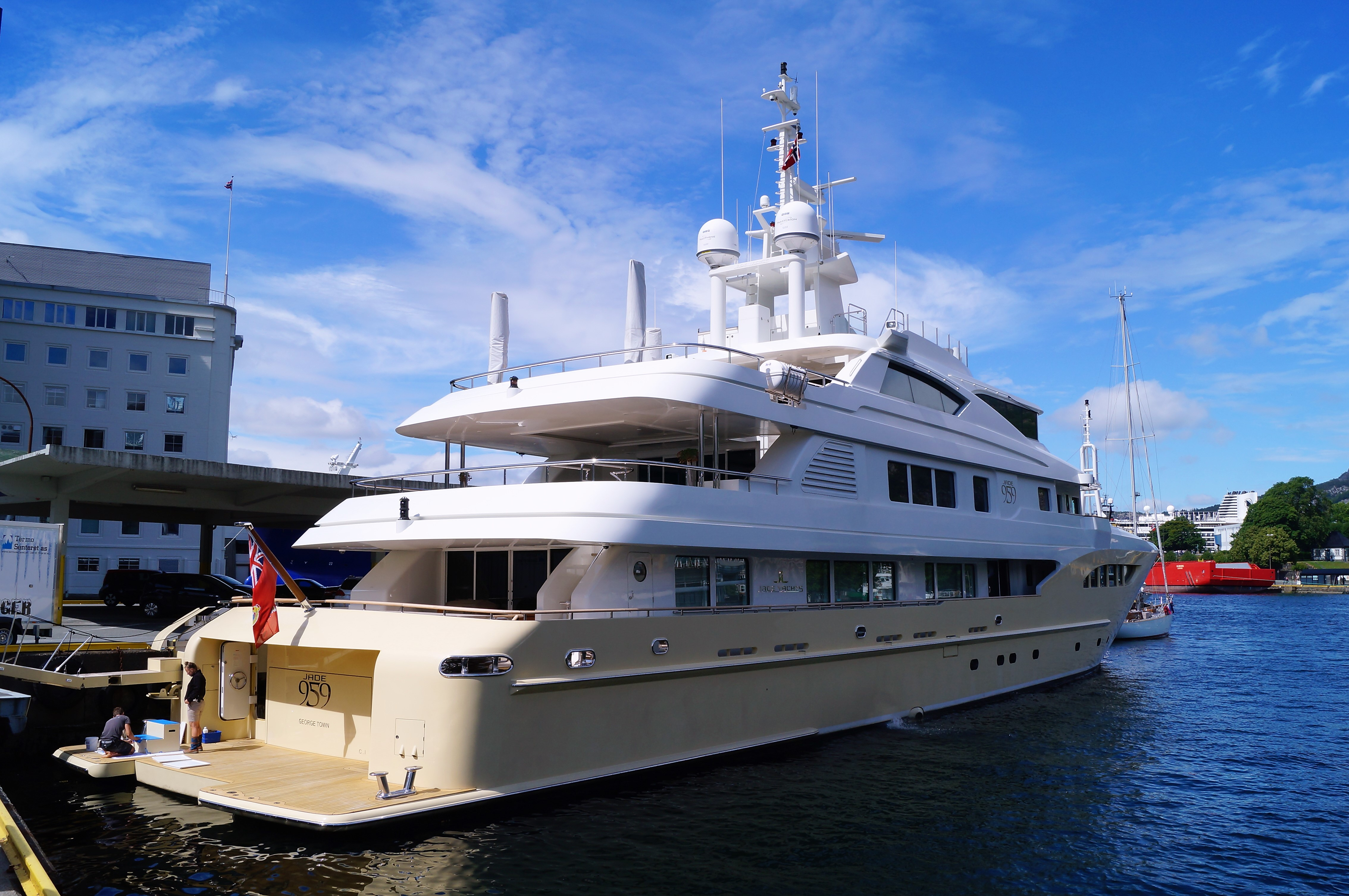
Jade 959 -yacht

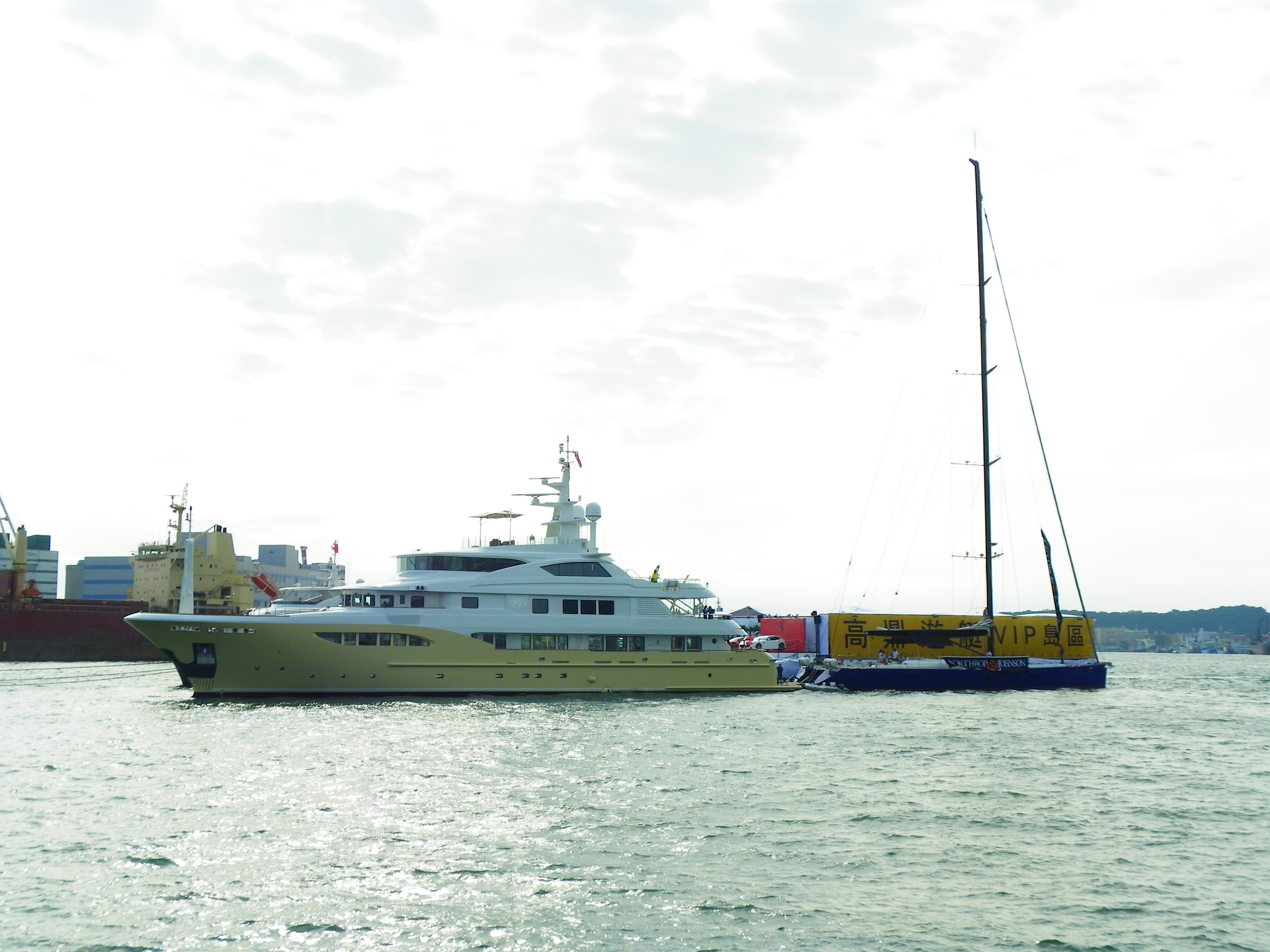
Jade Yachts VIP Island in Kaohsiung Harbour, Jade 959 on left

Jade Yachts was founded in 2004 as a subsidiary of the Jong Shyn Shipbuilding Company specializing in steel and aluminum yachts. In 2006 the yard delivered the 26.46-metre Bandido, which was the first steel-hulled motor yacht ever built in Taiwan.

In 2014 the company created a floating pavilion for the Taiwan International Boat Show.

In 2016 the yard gave the 65 m Benetti Ambrosia III its 10-year refit.

== Vessels ==
=== Motor Yacht Amadeus (Previous Names: Amadeus/Felix/Redemption) ===
Amadeus originally constructed in 1969 by Germany’s Neue Jadewerft as a research vessel, the 70m/230ft Amadeus underwent a two‑year conversion at Taiwan’s Jade Yachts beginning in 2006, emerging as an expedition-style superyacht in 2007. She was originally owned by Bernard Arnault. The conversion featured exterior redesign by Reymond Langton Design and interior styling by Zuretti, with naval architecture guidance from Vripack. This metamorphosis redefined her into a 1,622 GT explorer yacht, blending rugged capability with comfort—and has remained a hallmark transformation in modern yacht conversions.

=== Jade 959 ===
Jade 959 is a 52 m ice class yacht launched in 2014.

== See also ==
- List of companies of Taiwan
- Maritime industries of Taiwan
- Ocean Alexander
- Horizon Yachts
- Johnson Yachts
- Nordhavn/Ta shing (yacht)
