= Horizon Yacht =

Taiwanese yacht manufacturer

- Company type: Private company
- Industry: Luxury goods, maritime, industrial
- Founded: 1987; 39 years ago
- Headquarters: Kaohsiung, Taiwan
- Key people: John Lu, Gong Shan Chiai, and Cheng Shun Hui
- Products: Yacht manufacturing
- Number of employees: 800 (2019)
- Website: www.horizonyacht.com

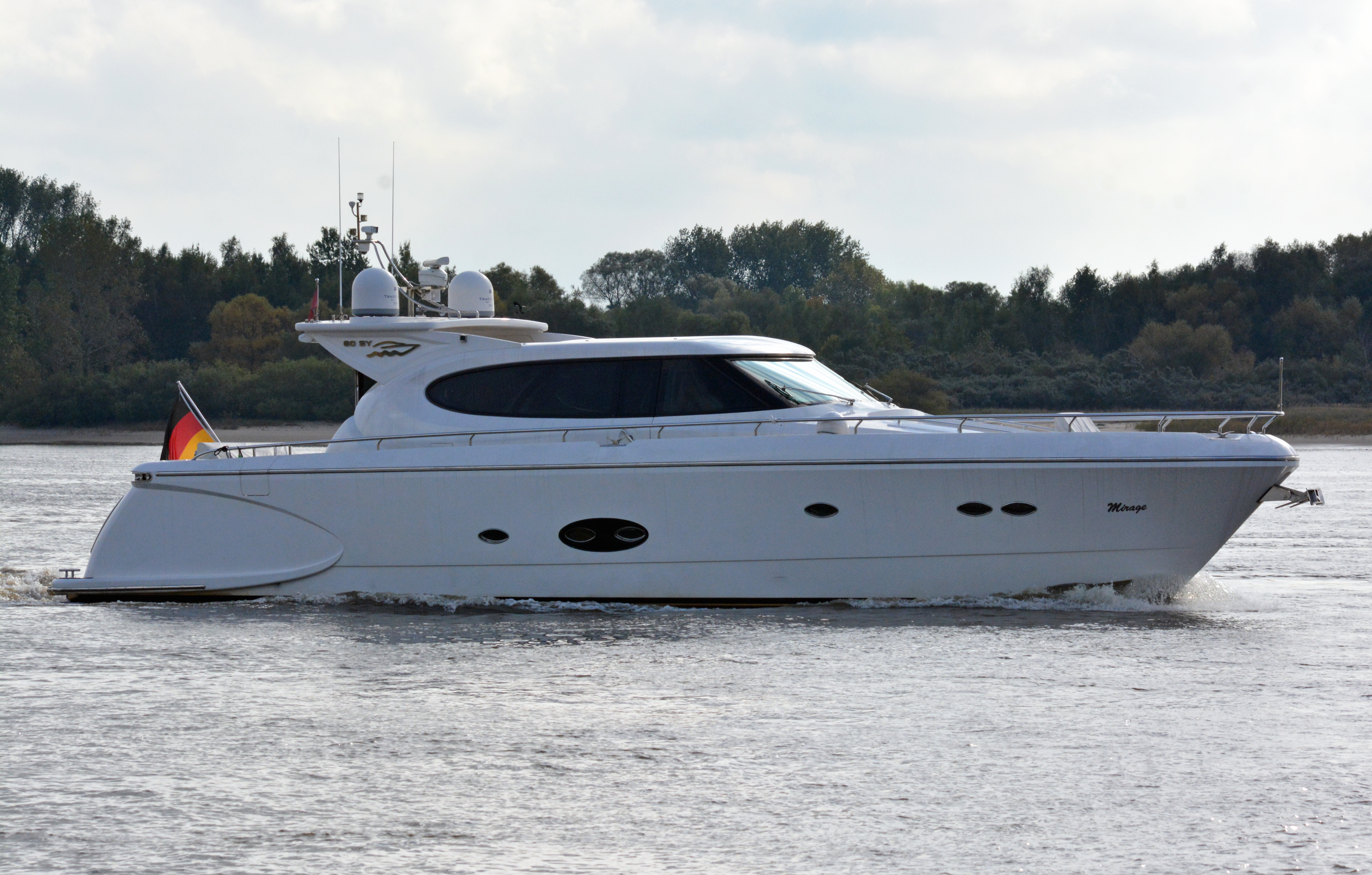
Mirage (Motor Yacht) E 60 SY - 19m

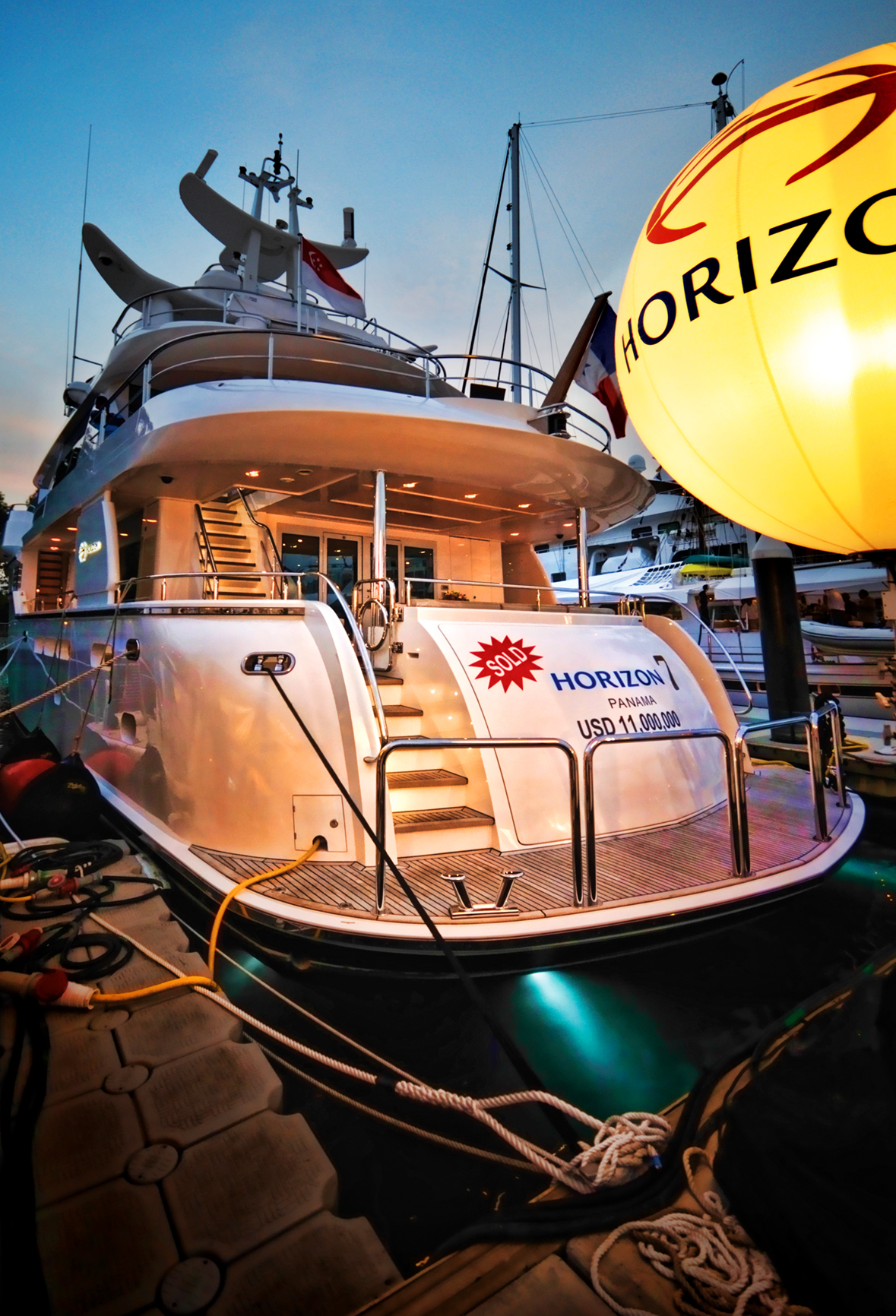
Horizon 7

Horizon Yacht (often referred to as Horizon Yachts) is a Taiwanese yacht manufacturer headquartered in the city of Kaohsiung. In 2018 Horizon was the tenth largest yacht builder in the world by total feet of yacht delivered.

== History ==
Horizon Yacht was founded in 1987 by John Lu, Gong Shan Chiai, and Cheng Shun Hui in Kaohsiung. Founded to supply yachts to domestic and American buyers, the company began targeting the European, Australian, and Asian markets in 1989. In the late 2010s expansion of Taiwan's domestic yachting market was beginning to allow Horizon to fulfill its original intention of selling domestically.

In 2019 they infused the hull and stiffeners of a 43m composite yacht in a single shot using vacuum infusion technology and proprietary 3D resin flow.

As of 2020 Horizon had delivered more than 835 yachts.

== Yachts ==
=== SunOne ===
SunOne is a 45m superyacht launched in 2012 as Polaris. She is the first and only yacht of the EP 148 class.

Rebecca is a 34m super yacht built launched in 2012, she was an entirely in-house project.

== Awards and honors ==
In 2019 Horizon Yacht won Best Asian Yacht Builder at the Asia Boating Awards. This was their 13th time winning the award.

== See also ==
- List of companies of Taiwan
- Maritime industries of Taiwan
- Ta shing (yacht)
- Tayana Yachts
- Ocean Alexander
- Jade Yachts
- Johnson Yachts
