= Ocean Resources Museum =

Museum in Magong, Penghu, Taiwan

- 海洋資源館
- Established: 1994 (Gallery A); 12 April 1997 (Gallery B)
- Location: Magong, Penghu, Taiwan
- Coordinates: 23°34′18″N 119°34′39″E
- Type: museum

The Ocean Resources Museum (traditional Chinese: 海洋資源館; simplified Chinese: 海洋资源馆; pinyin: Hǎiyáng Zīyuánguǎn) is a museum in Magong City, Penghu County, Taiwan.

== History ==
The construction of the Gallery A of the museum was completed in 1994 and was opened in the same year. It was done by Jyun-han Design and Construction. The construction of the Gallery B of the museum was completed in March 1997 and was opened on 12 April 1997. It was done by Penghu Enterprise Limited Company.

== Exhibitions ==
=== Gallery A ===
This gallery represents Penghu's marine ecology and resources with selected themes, such as the history of Penghu's marine culture, the evolution of marine lives, an introduction to Penghu's coral resources, the geology and topology of Penghu and the representation of Penghu's tidal flat. There are also a learning area and an auditorium room.

=== Gallery B ===
This gallery represents the development of local fisheries with several featured themes, including traditional fishing outfits, life in a fishing village, the development of fishing vessels, types of Penghu's fisheries, the distribution and harvest methods of the economic aquatic products in the waters around Penghu, and what it is like under the sea.

== See also ==
- List of museums in Taiwan
- Maritime industries of Taiwan
