= Ocean Alexander =

Taiwanese yacht manufacturer

- Type: Private company
- Industry: Luxury goods, maritime, industrial
- Founded: 1977; 49 years ago
- Headquarters: Kaohsiung, Taiwan
- Key people: Alex Chueh, John Chueh, Richard Allender
- Products: Yacht manufacturing,
- Website: https://oceanalexander.com

Ocean Alexander is a Taiwanese yacht manufacturer with shipyards in Taiwan and the United States. In 2021 it was the 4th largest yacht builder in the world by feet of yacht produced.

== History ==
Ocean Alexander was founded by Alex Chueh in 1977. The company has had a long relationship with American boat designer Ed Monk, jr son of the legendary Ed Monk, sr. The current President of Ocean Alexander is Alex’s son John Chueh. Ocean Alexander closed their Chinese yard in 2013. In 2018 70% of yachts produced by Ocean Alexander were for American customers.

=== Collaboration with Christensen ===
In 2009 Ocean Alexander formed a partnership with Christensen Shipyards to produce Ocean Alexander’s Evan K. Marshall designed 120 Megayacht at Christensen’s Vancouver, WA facility. Ocean Alexander shipped a mold across the pacific and production started on the first of three hulls in 2010. Hull #1 was launched in 2012 and named DREAM WEAVER. Following the completion of the first vessel Christensen suffered from management and financial challenges unrelated to the partnership with Ocean Alexander and all work ceased on the two hulls under construction. In 2015 Ocean Alexander made an initial commercial code filing which named the two hulls, designated "OA-1002 and OA-1003” as collateral. The two hulls were transported to Ocean Alexander’s Taiwan yard for completion. Hulls #2 and #3 completed in Taiwan have the addition of a beach club.

== See also ==
- List of companies of Taiwan
- Maritime industries of Taiwan
- Horizon Yachts
- Jade Yachts
- Johnson Yachts
