= Tamkang University Maritime Museum =

Museum in Tamsui, New Taipei, Taiwan

- 淡江大學海事博物館
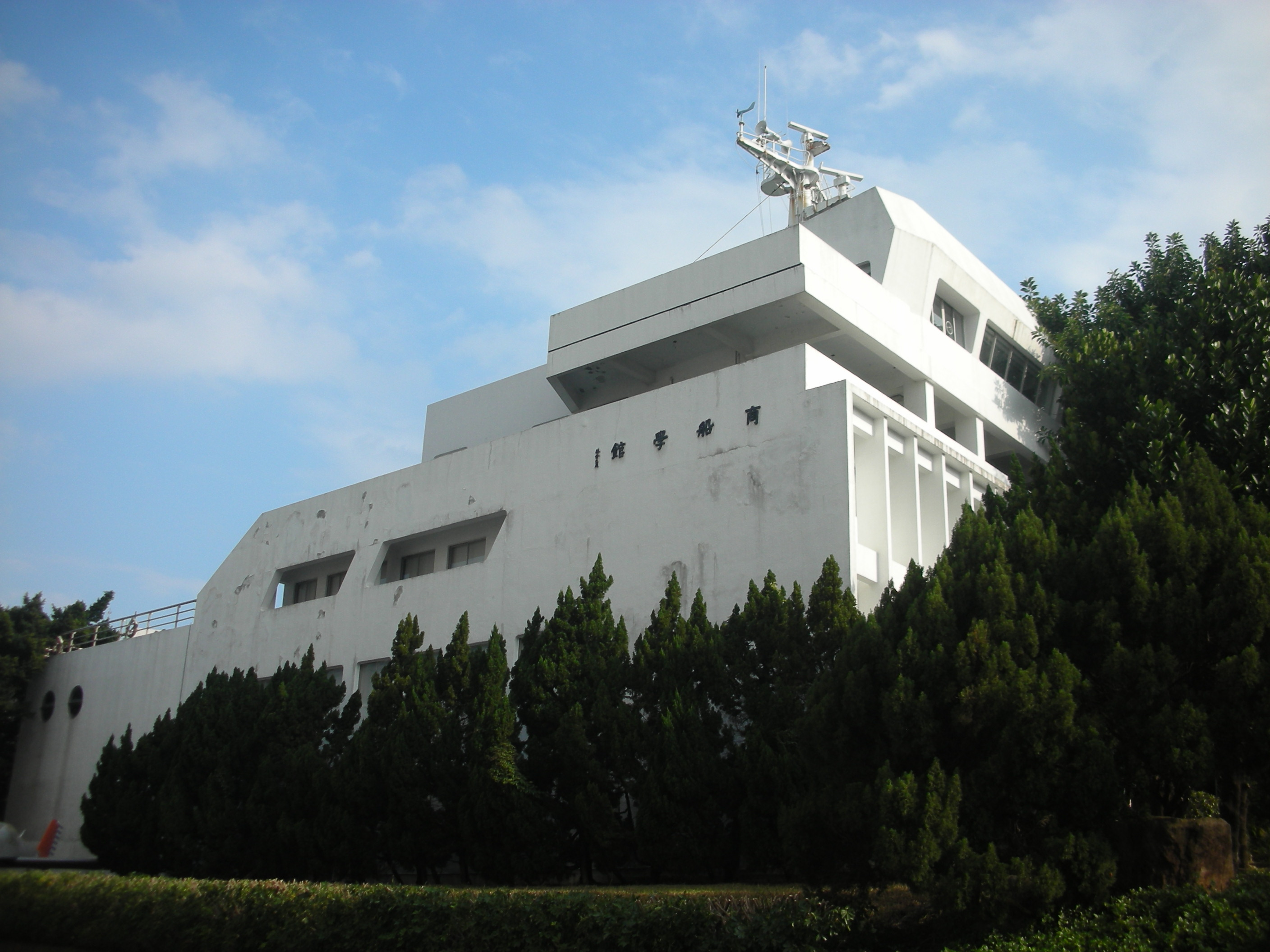
- Location: Tamsui, New Taipei, Taiwan
- Coordinates: 25°10′34.21″N 121°27′1.51″E
- Type: Maritime museum
- Owner: Tamkang University

The Tamkang University Maritime Museum (Chinese: 淡江大學海事博物館; pinyin: Dànjiāng Dàxué Hǎishì Bówùguǎn) is a museum on sea navigation located on the campus of Tamkang University in Tamsui District, New Taipei City in Taiwan. The museum is located in a building resembling a ship, which formerly served as a training center for future sailors on trading ships.

== Overview ==
The museum exhibits marine engines in the basement, models of famous historical and contemporary vessels and ancient maps on the first and second floor, marine utensils such as ropes, lights and anchors on the first floor, as well as providing an extensive library on the third floor. Entry to the museum is free.

The museum has a partnership with the Los Angeles Maritime Museum. Most texts in the museum are written in English and Chinese, as well as Japanese.

== Ship models ==
One of the museum's largest asset are its down-scaled realistic ship models, some of which are result of intense research. The models are presented in the following categories.

=== 戰艦 Historic combat vessels ===
- the San Philip. Spanish battleship, launched 1693; scrapped 1736.
- a typical Spanish galleon. (European sailing ship used from the 16th to 18th centuries.)
- HMS Victory. Launched 1765; took part in the Battle of Trafalgar; currently sits in dry dock in Portsmouth as a museum ship.
- HMS Royal William. Launched 1670 and rebuilt 1719; broken up 1813.
- Sovereign of the Seas. Launched 1637; burnt 1695. Famous for her extravagant decoration and with 102 cannons being the most powerfully armed ship in the world at her time.
- HMS Unicorn, 18th century "destroyer" designed by F.H. Chapman. Most probably HMS Unicorn (launched 1748 and broken up 1771), which was a model for the ship type frigate.
- the Great Harry. Launched 1514; destroyed probably 1553. She was the first English two-decker and the largest and most powerful warship in Europe at the time of her launching.
- the USS Missouri, an Iowa-class battleship. Launched 1944; currently serving as a museum ship at Pearl Harbor, Hawaii. The USS Missouri was the site of the official Japanese surrender in World War II.
- a Nimitz-class aircraft carrier. First ship launched 1975; all vessels still active. Largest warship in the world today.
- the Italian school ship Amerigo Vespucci. Launched 1931 and still in service.
- the Caesar Bireme, a Roman galley from around 30 BC.
- the French Toulonnaise. Launched 1823 in Toulon; decommissioned 1843.
- the Swedish Vasa. Launched 1628 in Stockholm; sunk after sailing less than a mile; salvaged 1961 and today exhibited in Vasa Museum in Stockholm.
- the German battleship Bismarck. Launched 1940; sunk 1941.
- a German submarine from World War II.
- the Japanese battleship Yamato. Launched 1940; sunk 1945. Yamato and her sister ship Musashi were the largest, heaviest, and most powerful battleships ever constructed.

=== 帆船 Historic sailing vessels ===
- a Zheng He treasure ship. Early 15th century, China.
- a Qing dynasty Battleship. This model has been constructed one Mr. Pauwels of Belgium after years of research on Chinese sailing traditions. The hull is carved from a single piece of wood, and is fully rigged, including wooden figures representing Chinese sailors on deck.
- a Zheng Chenggong Chung-chun Boat. 17th century, China.
- the King Ho Li
- Christopher Columbus' Santa María (two models)
- another Spanish galleon.
- the English tea clipper Cutty Sark. Launched 1869; used as merchant vessel until 1923; then as stationary training ship until 1954; and as museum ship at Greenwich, London until today.
- the Canadian fishing and racing ship Bluenose. Launched 1921 to compete in the Nova Scotian Fishing Schooner Delawana; won that prize several times; sunk 1946 off Haiti.
- James Cook's famous HMS Endeavour. Launched 1768; sold 1775.
- the Goleta. A commercial ship of the 19th century Mediterranean.
- the French Astrolabe. Launched 1811 named La Coquille; used by Louis Isidore Duperrey to circumnavigate the world between 1822 and 1825; retired 1851.
- the Danish school ship Lilladan. Launched 1951.
- the Dutch De Liefde. The vessel became a model for Japan's first Western-style sailing ships after it accidentally landed in Japan in 1600. Aboard was the sailor William Adams who later became advisor to the Japanese Shogun.
- the Japanese school ship Nippon Maru II. Launched 1984; still in service.

=== 輪船 Modern commercial ships ===
- Evergreen Marine Corporation's container ship Ever Trust
- Evergreen Marine Corporation's bulk carrier Ever Glory
- another typical container ship
- principal depiction of a 100,000 DWMT bulk carrier
- the ocean liner RMS Queen Mary. Launched 1934; retired 1967; now hotel / restaurant / museum in Long Beach, California.
- the ocean liner RMS Titanic. Launched 1911; sank 1912.
- the ocean liner RMS Britannia. Launched 1840; sunk 1880.
- a Liberty ship. A class of cargo ships built in the US between 1941 and 1945 to replace ships lost to U-boats during the war. With 2,751 of those ships produced this is easily the largest number of ships produced to a single design.
- the container ship Venus
- the Panamax container ship "璟龍輪". Launched 1997.
- the cruise ship MS Fuji Maru. Launched 1937; sunk 1943.
- the Yamato-I. Superconducted Electromagnet-propelled Boat.
- the cruise ship Royal Viking Sea. Launched 1973 for Royal Viking Line.
- principal depiction of a 28,000 DWMT bulk carrier.

=== 漁船 Fishing vessels ===
- A Taiwanese Spearfish Boat. This boat was specifically designed to catch Spearfish (Marlin), which is quite different from catching other fish. Spearfish are caught using harpoons or with nets that have sharp gills. Spearfish are traditionally caught in Eastern Taiwan during the nord-east wind season in October and November.
- A Tamsui sampan boat. Tamsui River is the only water in Taiwan where these boats were traditionally used for fishing. A long time ago they were also used to reach northern Taiwan from Mainland China. Some of these boats are still in use today.

=== 遊艇 Pleasure and racing vessels ===
- HMY Royal Caroline, built 1749 in Bedford for George II of Great Britain; in service as the king's state yacht and regatta vessel until 1805; dismantled 1820.
- HMY Mary, built in 1660 by the Dutch East India Company; served as first royal yacht in history to king Charles II of England; wrecked on a reef in 1675.
- a typical Venetian gondola.
- Swedish Royal Yacht Amphion. Built in Stockholm; launched in 1778, served as yacht to Gustav III of Sweden and also as a warship in battle against Russia.
- Principal depiction of a modern 46-foot sailing yacht.

=== 作業船 Construction and utilitarian vessels ===
- a Multi-purpose Service Boat
- a principal depiction of the oil drilling ship "Western Offshore NO. VIII" (Built in Keelung from an ex-USA oil tanker.)
- an Icebreaker.

=== Taiwanese Aboriginal boats ===
- an Assembled Boat (拼板船) as traditionally used by the Taiwanese aboriginal Tao people on Orchid Island (Lanyu). Their method of boat building from several pieces of wood is unique to the Tao people, which are well known for their Assembled Boats. Although those boats are often referred to as "Orchid Island Canoes" or "Lanyu Canoes," they are actually not canoes, but boats, because they are assembled from several pieces of different woods. To build the boats either 21 (for the small variant) or 27 (for the larger variant) pieces of wood are used, where different kinds of wood are used for different pieces. These boats are only painted using the colors black, white and red. The colors are produced from materials found naturally on the island.
  This boat is exhibited as original, not a model.
- A New Zealand Māori War Canoe (Ngatokimatawhaorua). This is the largest canoe in the world. It was built in 1940 using techniques already known before the colonization period. It has a length of 35 m and offers space for 80 persons paddling. It was made from three large trees: one for the main boat, one for the head and the stern and the third one for the paddles. (獨木舟.)

== Transportation ==
The museum is accessible within walking distance North from Tamsui Station of the Taipei Metro.

== See also ==
- Maritime industries of Taiwan
