= Evergreen Maritime Museum =

Museum in Zhongzheng, Taipei, Taiwan

- 長榮海事博物館
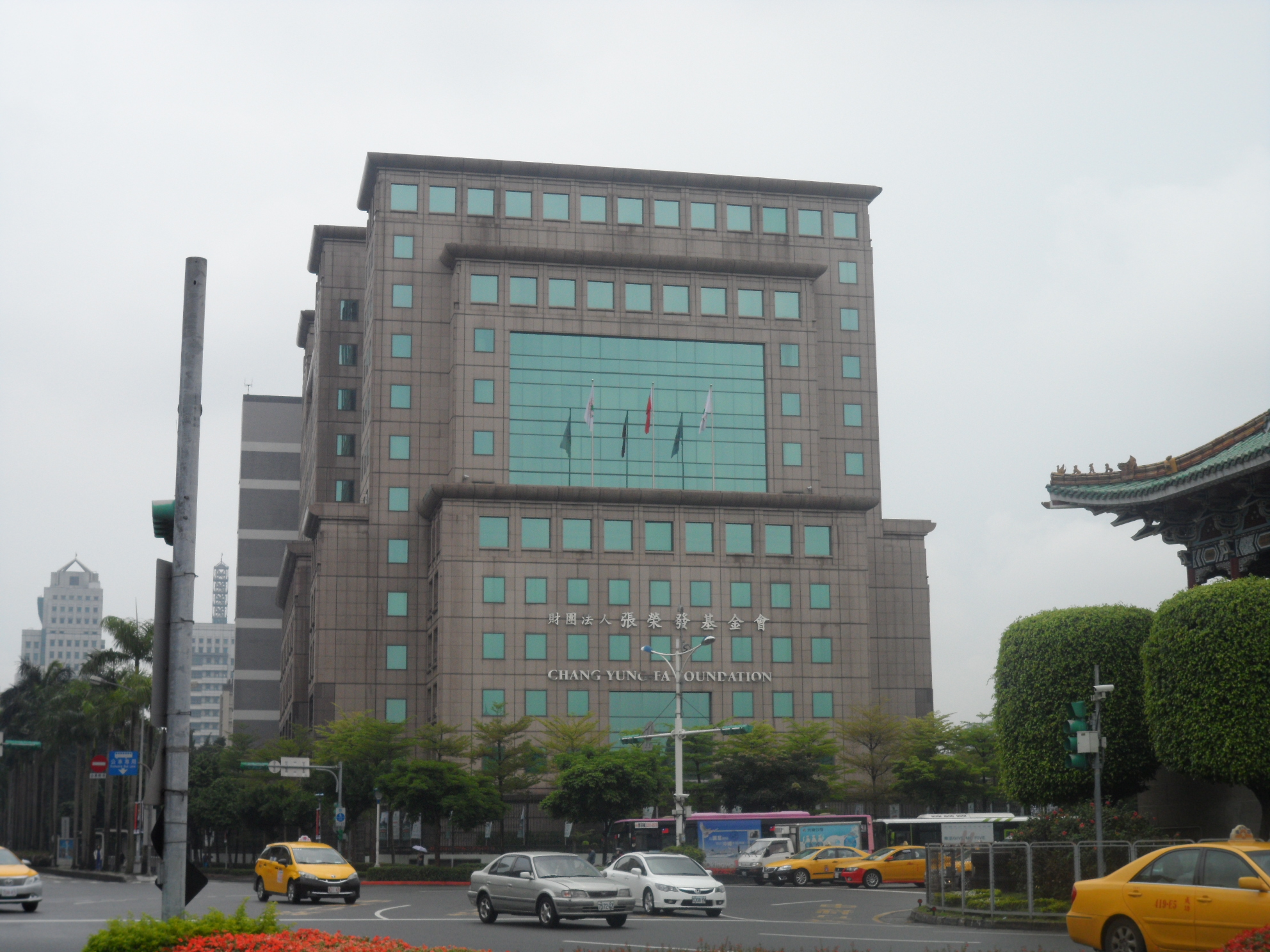
- Established: 7 October 2008
- Location: Zhongzheng, Taipei, Taiwan
- Coordinates: 25°02′19″N 121°31′08″E
- Type: museum
- Owner: Evergreen Group
- Website: Official website (in Chinese)

The Evergreen Maritime Museum (traditional Chinese: 長榮海事博物館; simplified Chinese: 长荣海事博物馆; pinyin: Zhǎngróng Hǎishì Bówùguǎn) is a maritime museum in Zhongzheng District, Taipei City, Taiwan.

== History ==
After nearly a decade of planning, the museum was opened on 7 October 2008.

== Mission ==
The mission of the museum is to preserve and present the history, art and science of boats and ships, in the hope of generating public interest in maritime culture and in turn inspiring the pursuit of knowledge and the spirit of exploration.

== Architecture ==
- Ticket office, information corner, museum shop
- Navigation and exploration
- Maritime Taiwan and marine paintings
- Modern ships and special exhibition
- History of ships

== Exhibitions and collections ==
The Evergreen Maritime Museum consists of multiple exhibitions spanning five floors including scale models, dioramas, maps and globes, various navigational equipment, anchors, graphic timelines and vessel backgrounds, and interactive games for kids. There is also a special section dedicated to the Titanic as well as some poignant artifacts from Titanic passengers. The ground floor is free to the public and features a cafe, and a giftshop.

Floors 2–5 include comprehensive showcases of scale model ships both ancient and modern along with other memorabilia. Though not apparent from the museum's official website, the permanent collection on display on these floors is vast and of high quality.

The exhibitions are divided by the following categories:

- Maritime Taiwan
- Marine paintings
- Modern ships
- History of ships

=== Scale model collection ===
Here is a partial list of the scale models (ship vessels) on display as of (4 June 2017)

Vessel name	Vessel country	Power type	Date	Model builder	Model scale	Vessel type
Riverboat	Ancient Egypt	Wind / rowing	N/A	N/A	N/A	Riverboat
Trirome	Ancient Greece	N/A	N/A	N/A	N/A	
La Capitana	N/A	N/A	N/A	N/A	N/A	Captain's ship
Oseberg Ship	N/A	N/A	N/A	N/A	N/A	
Hanseatic Cog	N/A	N/A	N/A	N/A	N/A	
Hansa Cog	N/A	N/A	N/A	N/A	N/A	
Caravel	N/A	N/A	N/A	N/A	N/A	
Santa María	N/A	N/A	N/A	N/A	N/A	Caravel
Mayflower	N/A	N/A	N/A	N/A	N/A	fluyt
Golden Hind	N/A	N/A	N/A	N/A	N/A	
Vasa	N/A	N/A	1628(Built)	N/A	N/A	
Sovereign of the Seas	N/A	N/A	1637(Launched)	N/A	N/A	
Le Soleil Royal	N/A	N/A	N/A	N/A	N/A	
USS Constitution	N/A	N/A	1797(Launched)	N/A	N/A	
HMS Queen Anne	N/A	N/A	N/A	N/A	N/A	
HMS Victory	N/A	N/A	N/A	N/A	N/A	
Endeavor	N/A	N/A	N/A	N/A	N/A	Barque
Jutta	N/A	N/A	N/A	N/A	N/A	
Nippon Maru II	N/A	N/A	N/A	N/A	N/A	
Flying Cloud	N/A	N/A	N/A	N/A	N/A	clipper
Cutty Sark	N/A	N/A	N/A	N/A	N/A	clipper
Lightning	N/A	N/A	N/A	N/A	N/A	
Dhow	Arabian Peninsula	N/A	N/A	N/A	N/A	Dhow
America	N/A	N/A	N/A	N/A	N/A	
Juan Sebastian de Elcano	N/A	N/A	N/A	N/A	N/A	Barquentine
English steam yacht	England	Steam	N/A	N/A	N/A	yacht
City of Paris	France	N/A	1880	N/A	N/A	
PS Columbia	N/A	Steam	N/A	N/A	N/A	
Belle of St. Louis	N/A	N/A	N/A	N/A	N/A	
Steam paddle (Edwardian style)	N/A	N/A	N/A	N/A	N/A	River paddle boat
PS Medway Queen	England	N/A	N/A	N/A	N/A	Riverboat
Mt. Washington	N/A	Steam	1872?	N/A	N/A	River paddle boat
Adriatic	USA	N/A	N/A	N/A	N/A	
SS Great Eastern	N/A	N/A	N/A	N/A	N/A	
PS Duchess of Fife	N/A	N/A	N/A	N/A	N/A	Paddle steamer
Stephan Cel Mare	Romania	N/A	N/A	N/A	1:48	
SY Triad	N/A	N/A	N/A	N/A	N/A	
USS Aramis	US	N/A	N/A	N/A	N/A	
RMS Oceanic (1899)	N/A	N/A	N/A	N/A	N/A	
RMS Titanic	N/A	N/A	N/A	N/A	N/A	
RMS Doric	N/A	N/A	N/A	N/A	1:100	Twin-screw ocean liner
SS France	N/A	N/A	N/A	N/A	1:500	
TS Michelangelo	N/A	N/A	N/A	N/A	1:500	
RMS Windsor Castle	N/A	N/A	N/A	N/A	N/A	
SS Andrea Doria	N/A	N/A	N/A	N/A	N/A	
SS Oceanic (1963)	N/A	N/A	N/A	N/A	N/A	
RMS Queen Elizabeth	N/A	N/A	N/A	N/A	N/A	
SS Uganda	N/A	N/A	N/A	N/A	N/A	
OOCL Lion	N/A	N/A	N/A	N/A	N/A	
RMS Queen Mary	N/A	N/A	N/A	N/A	N/A	ocean liner
SS Normandie	France	N/A	1932(launched)	N/A	1:500	ocean liner
Fu Chuan	China (Yangtze River)	N/A	N/A	N/A	1:15	Junk Boat
Sha Chuan	China (Yangtze River)	N/A	N/A	N/A	1:15	Junk Boat
King Boat	Taiwan	N/A	N/A	N/A	1:26	Religious Ritual Boat
Mullet Boat	N/A	N/A	N/A	N/A	1:15	Fishing Boat
Harpoon Boat	N/A	N/A	N/A	N/A	1:15	Fishing Boat

== Visitor information ==
=== Language requirements ===
The museum is English, Japanese, and Chinese language friendly. All placards, way-finding, etc., are bilingual in English and Chinese with equal content in both languages. There are special booklets in the exhibitions for Japanese visitors.

Multi-language tours are available upon request on the ground floor. Ask the gift shop / ticketing booth staff. Audio guides (using your smartphone with headphones) are also available via scanning QR codes throughout the museum.

=== Visiting hours ===
Open on Tuesday–Sunday: 9:00–17:00

Closures: Every Monday (open on national holidays) Chinese New Year's Eve Day-off due to natural disaster Other planned closures announced on the official website.

=== Accessibility ===
The museum is wheelchair accessible with elevator access to all floors.

=== Museum address ===
5F., No.11, Zhongshan S.Rd., Zhongzheng District, Taipei City 100, Taiwan (R.O.C.)

== Transportation ==
The museum is accessible within walking distance from two MRT stations. One way is southeast from NTU Hospital Station of the Taipei Metro. Another way to the museum is from MRT Chiang Kai Shek Memorial, Exit 5 of Taipei Metro and crossing main plaza of the Chiang Kai Chek Memorial, National Theatre and Concert Hall.

== See also ==
- List of museums in Taiwan
- Evergreen Group
- Maritime industries of Taiwan
