= Yilan-class patrol vessel =

Taiwanese Coast Guard ships

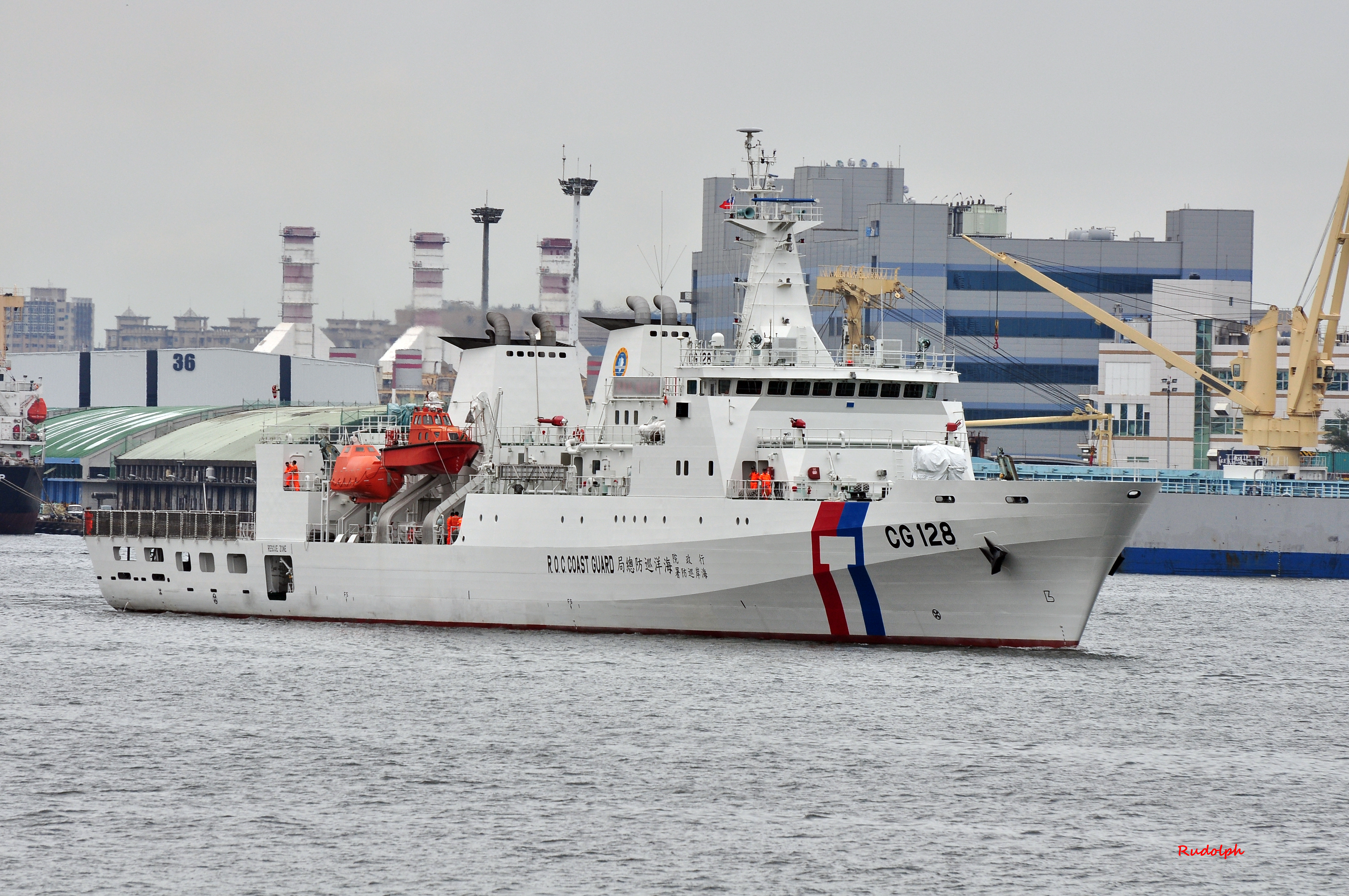
- Yilan (CG128)

Class overview
- Builders: Jong Shyn Shipbuilding Company
- Operators: Coast Guard Administration
- Planned: 2
- Completed: 2
- Active: 2

General characteristics
- Type: Heavy patrol vessel
- Displacement: 3,719 tons
- Length: 119.42 m (391 ft 10 in)
- Beam: 15.2 m (49 ft 10 in)
- Propulsion: 5,200 kW (7,000 hp) x 4
- Armament: Bofors 40mm main gun
- Aircraft carried: UH-60/S-70C
- Aviation facilities: Hangar

The Yilan-class patrol vessel is a pair of heavy patrol vessels of the Coast Guard Administration of Taiwan.

They have a maximum crew of 50. The vessels have advanced quieting and interior noise control.

== History ==
The two ships of the class, Yilan and Kaohsiung were commissioned together on June 6, 2015. The original plan was for one vessel to primarily be deployed to the East China Sea and for one to primarily be deployed to the South China Sea.

== Vessels ==
=== Yilan (CG128) ===
The first vessel of the class is named Yilan (CG128).

=== Kaohsiung (CG129) ===
The second vessel of the class is named Kaohsiung (CG129). In June 2020 Kaohsiung and another coast guard vessel detained a large Chinese sand dredging vessel which had been illegally harvesting sand in Taiwanese waters.

== Gallery ==
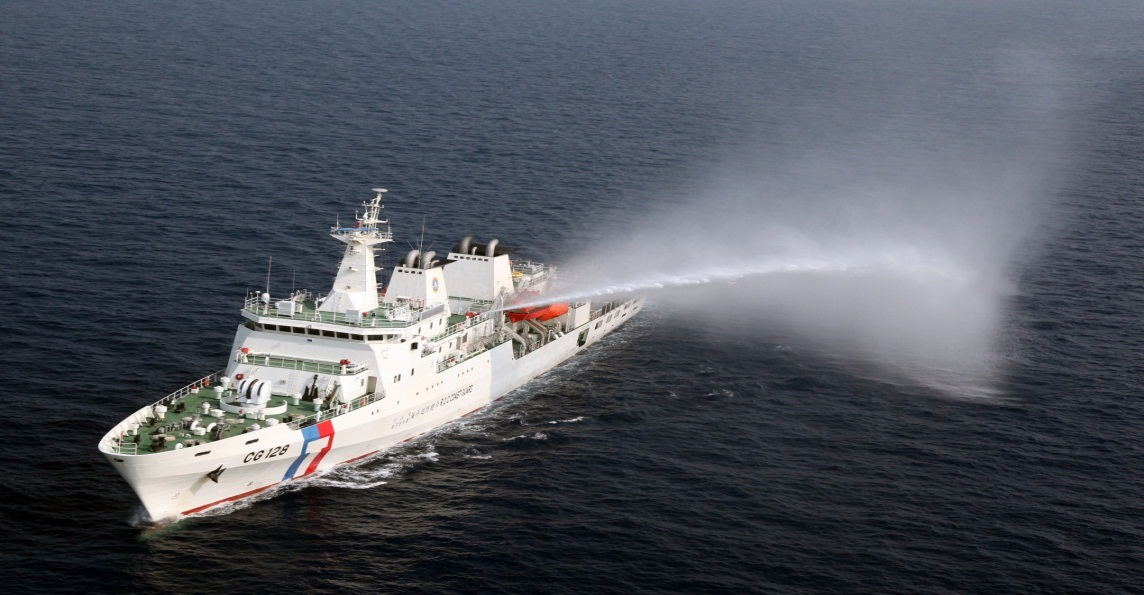
Yilan (CG128)

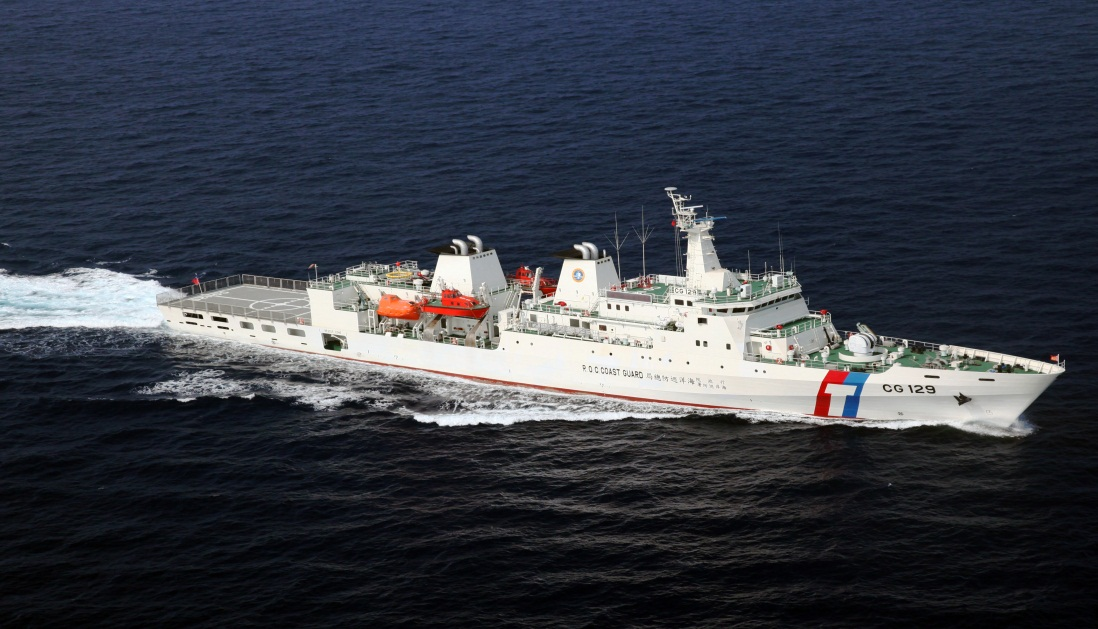
Kaohsiung (CG129)

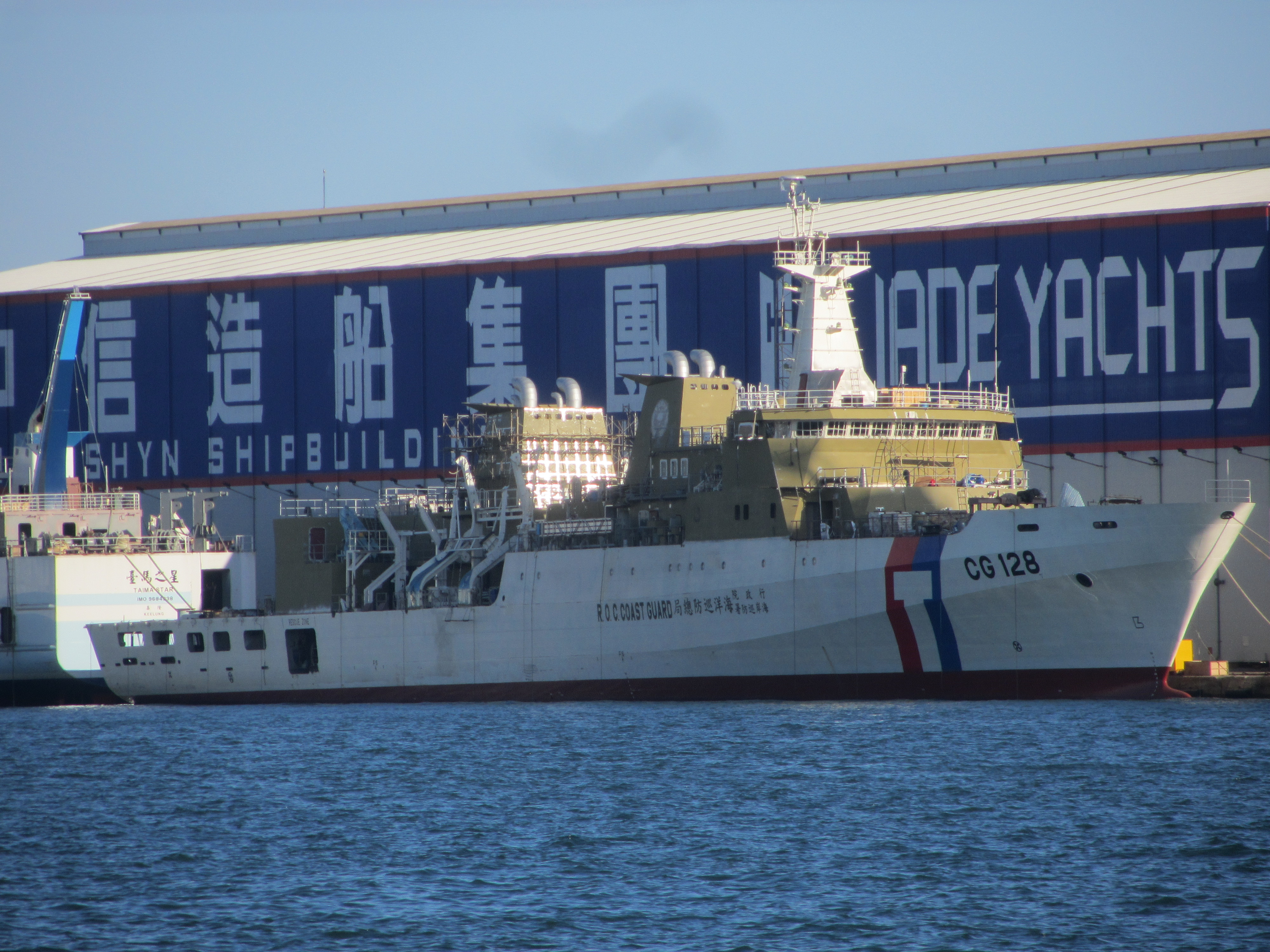
CG 128 in build

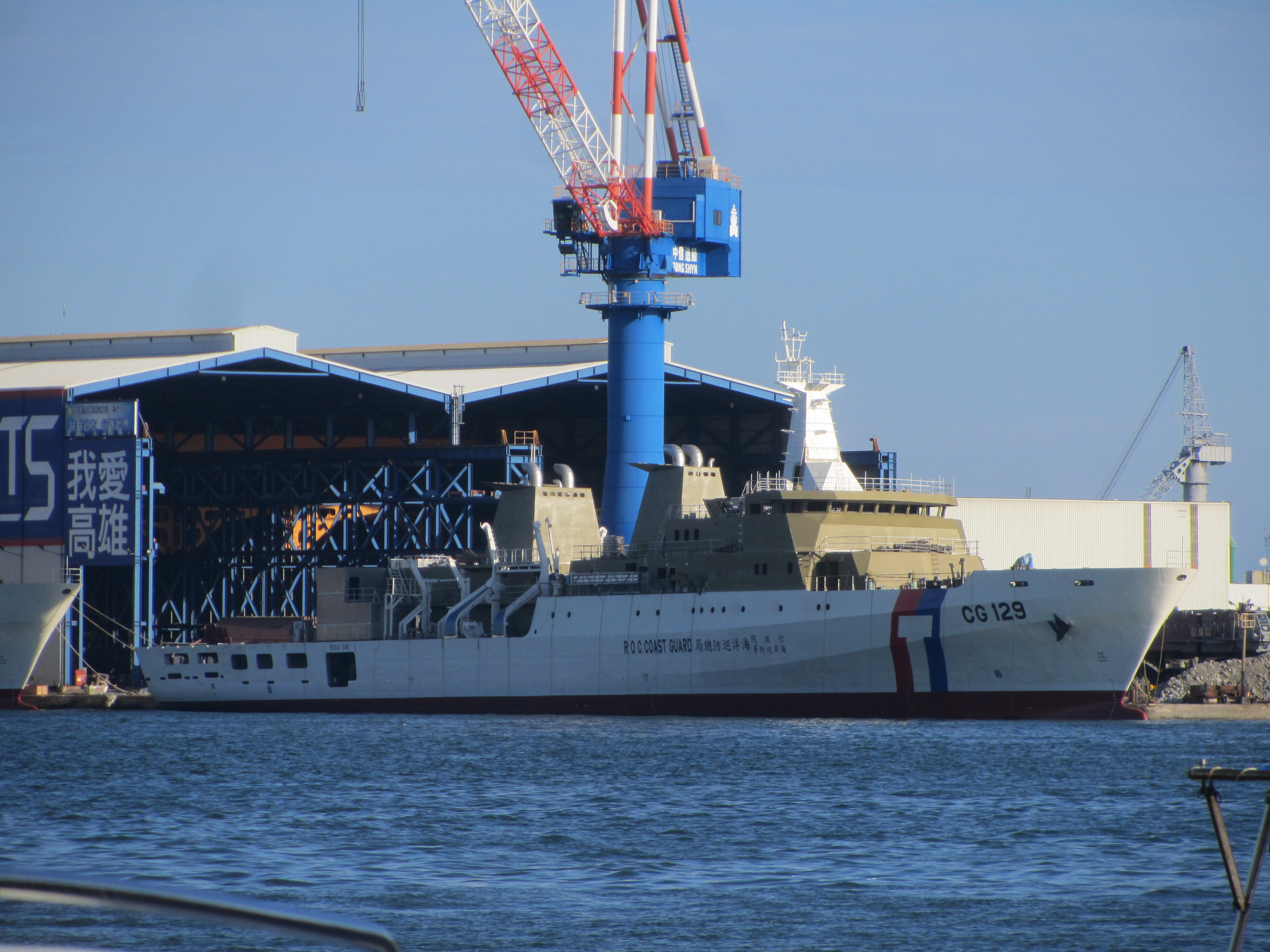
CG 129 in build

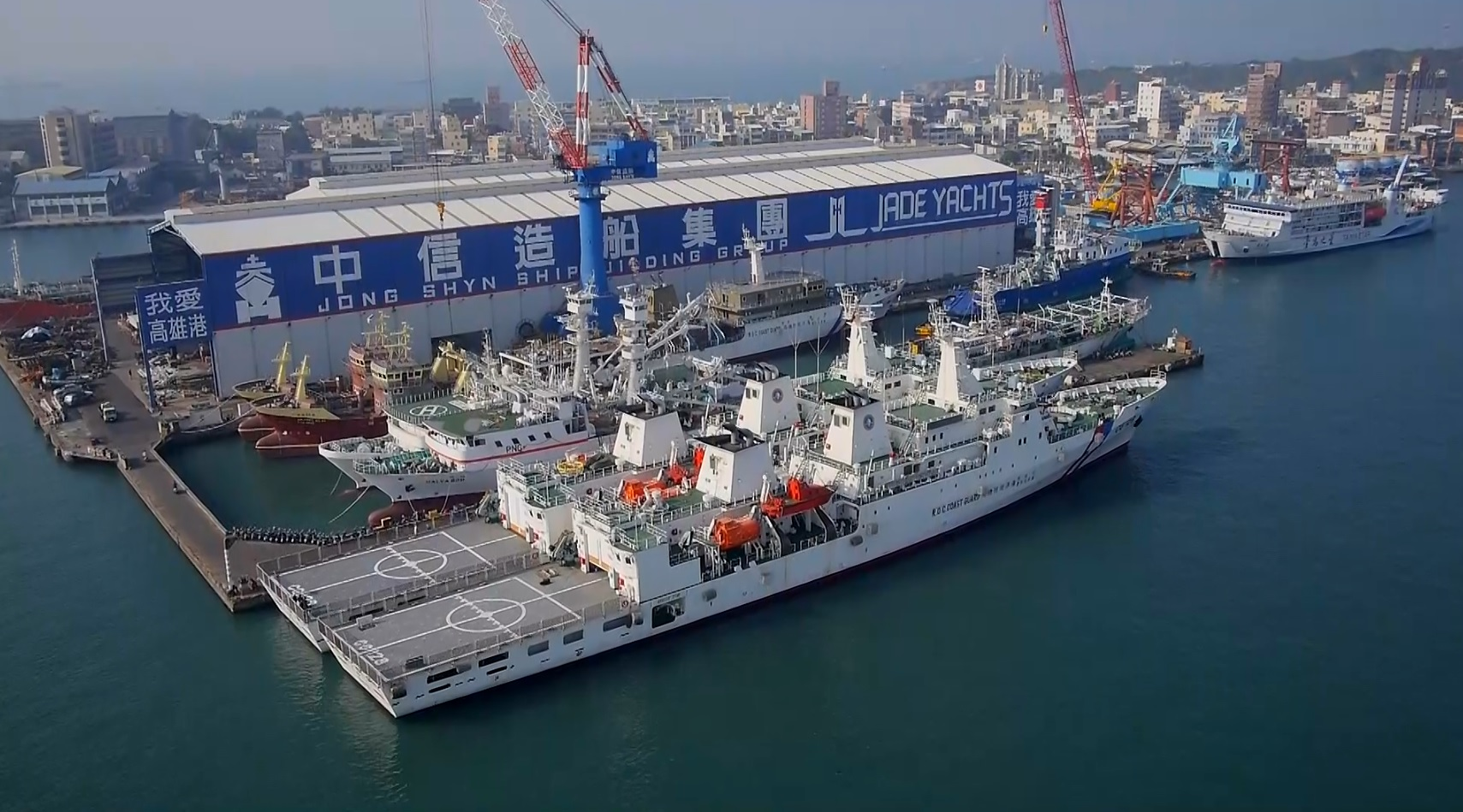
Yilan and Kaohsiung in build at Jong Shyn Shipbuilding Company

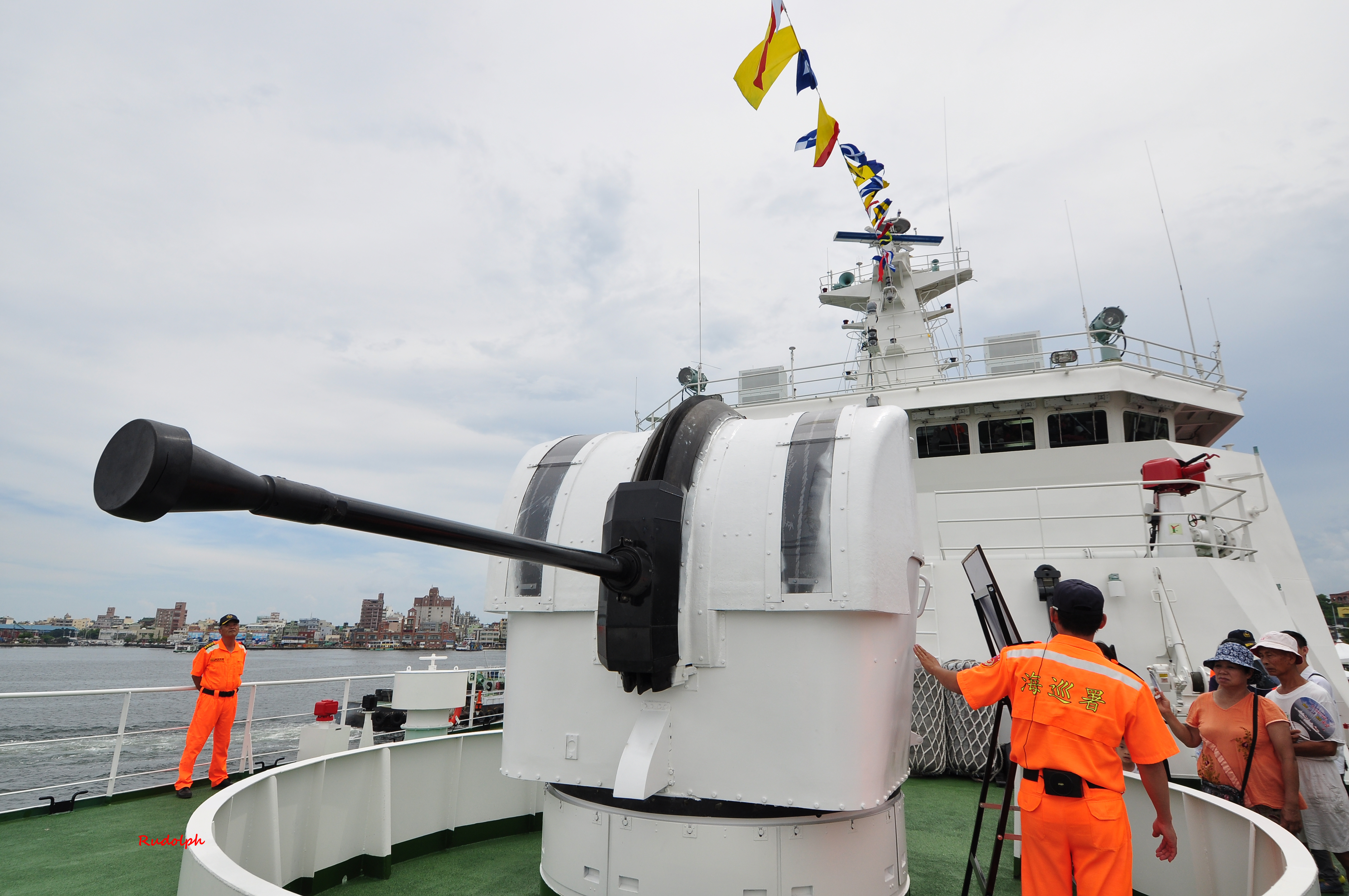
40mm Bofors main gun aboard CG 129

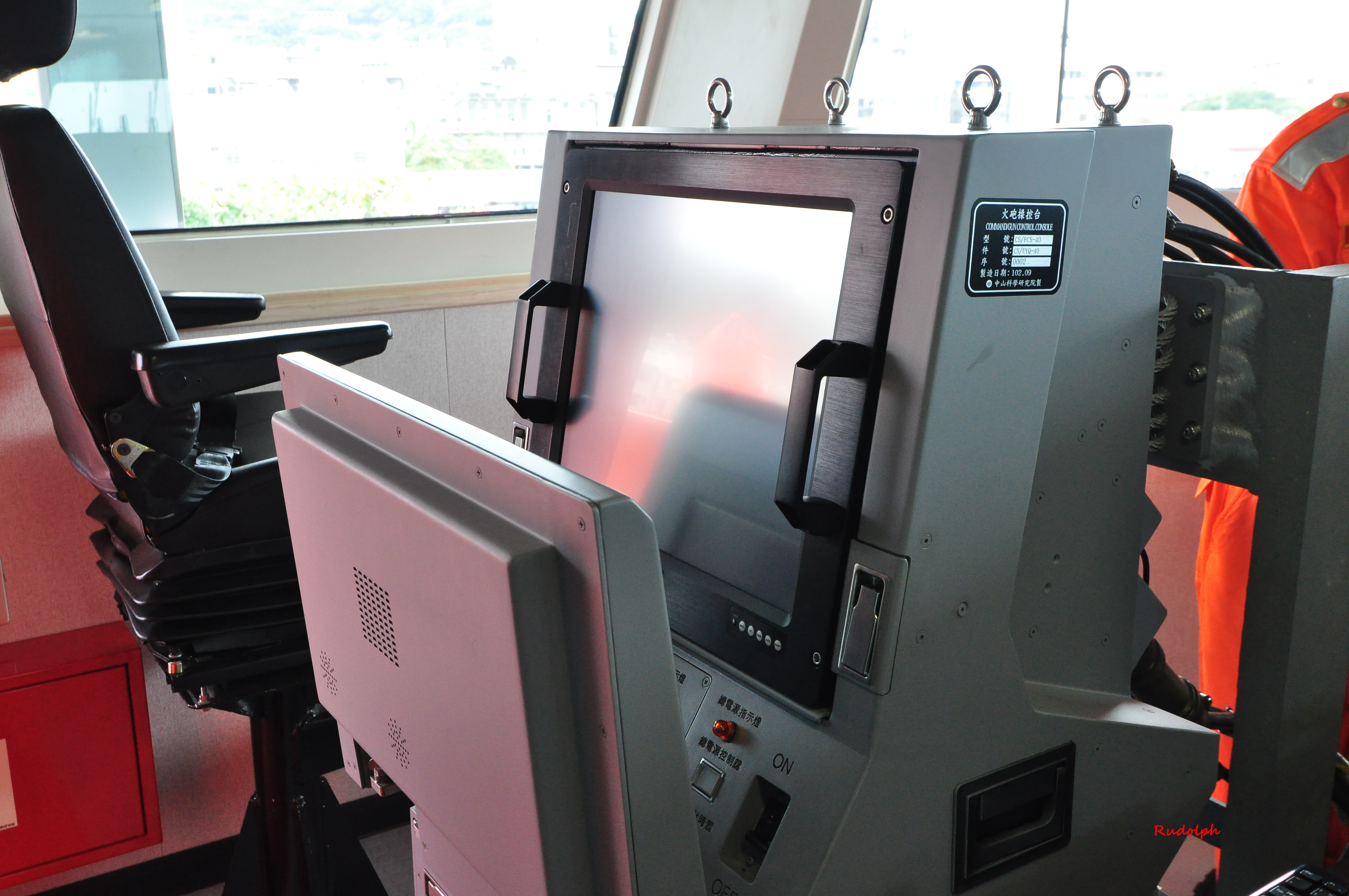
Weapons station aboard CG 129

== See also ==
- Chiayi-class patrol vessel
- Anping-class offshore patrol vessel
- Miaoli-class patrol vessel
- Cheng Kung-class frigate
- Kang Ding-class frigate
