= Anping-class offshore patrol vessel =

Taiwanese class of patrol vessels

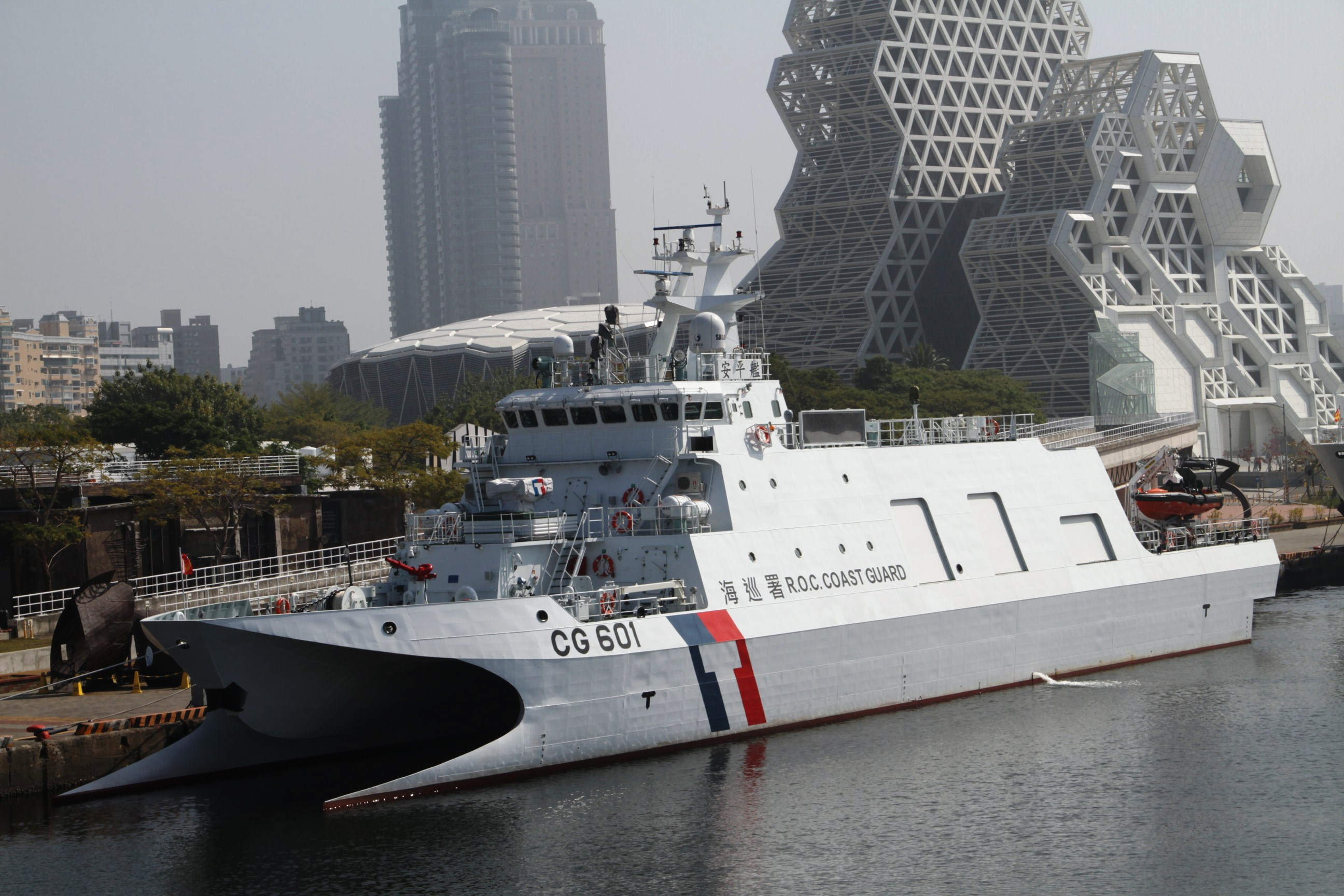
- Anping (CG-601)

Class overview
- Builders: Jong Shyn Shipbuilding Company
- Operators: Coast Guard Administration
- Built: 2019–present
- Planned: 12
- On order: 1
- Building: 1
- Completed: 10
- Active: 10

General characteristics
- Type: Medium patrol vessel
- Speed: 44 knots (81 km/h; 51 mph)
- Armament: water cannon; 20 mm cannon; NCSIST 2.75in rockets remote weapon station; Fitted for but not with: HF-2 and HF-3 missiles; Phalanx CIWS
- Notes: Price was T$1.05 billion ($37.30 million) for CG 601

The Anping class is a class of offshore patrol vessels manufactured by Jong Shyn Shipbuilding Company for the Coast Guard Administration of Taiwan.

The class is based on the Tuo Chiang-class corvettes of the Republic of China Navy but lacks the 76 mm (3.0 in) main gun and has modifications for use in the law enforcement role. They are fitted for but not with the HF-3 and HF-2 anti-ship missiles with the same capacity as the Tuo Chiang class. In wartime they would serve as fast attack craft.

== History ==
Construction of the first vessel began in January 2019 at the Jong Shyn Shipbuilding Company's Kaohsiung shipyard.

In May 2022, the Anping ship launched a HF-2 anti-ship missile for the first time in a joint exercise with the Navy, indicating the ship has the ability to join battles during wars.

== Vessels ==
A total of twelve vessels are planned.

Anping class construction data
Hull number	Ship	Builder	Laid down	Launched	Commissioned	Status
CG 601	Anping (安平)	JSSC	June 2019	April 2020	December 2020	Active
CG 602	Chengkung (成功)	JSSC	February 2020	December 2020	June 2021	Active
CG 603	Tamsui (淡水)	JSSC	August 2020	May 2021	October 2021	Active
CG 605	Cijin (旗津)	JSSC	January 2021	October 2021	April 2022	Active
CG 606	Bali (八里)	JSSC	July 2021	April 2022	October 2022	Active
CG 607	Ji'an (吉安)	JSSC	February 2022	October 2022	May 2023	Active
CG 609	Wanli (萬里)	JSSC	August 2022	May 2023	November 2023	Active
CG610	Yongkang (永康)	JSSC	January 2023	November 2023	June 2024	Active
CG611	Changbin (長濱)	JSSC	August 2023	June 2024	January 2025	Active
CG612	Suao (蘇澳)	JSSC		January 2025	October 2025	Active
CG613	Lanyu (蘭嶼)	JSSC		October 2025	2026	
CG615		JSSC	October 2024			Under construction

== Gallery ==
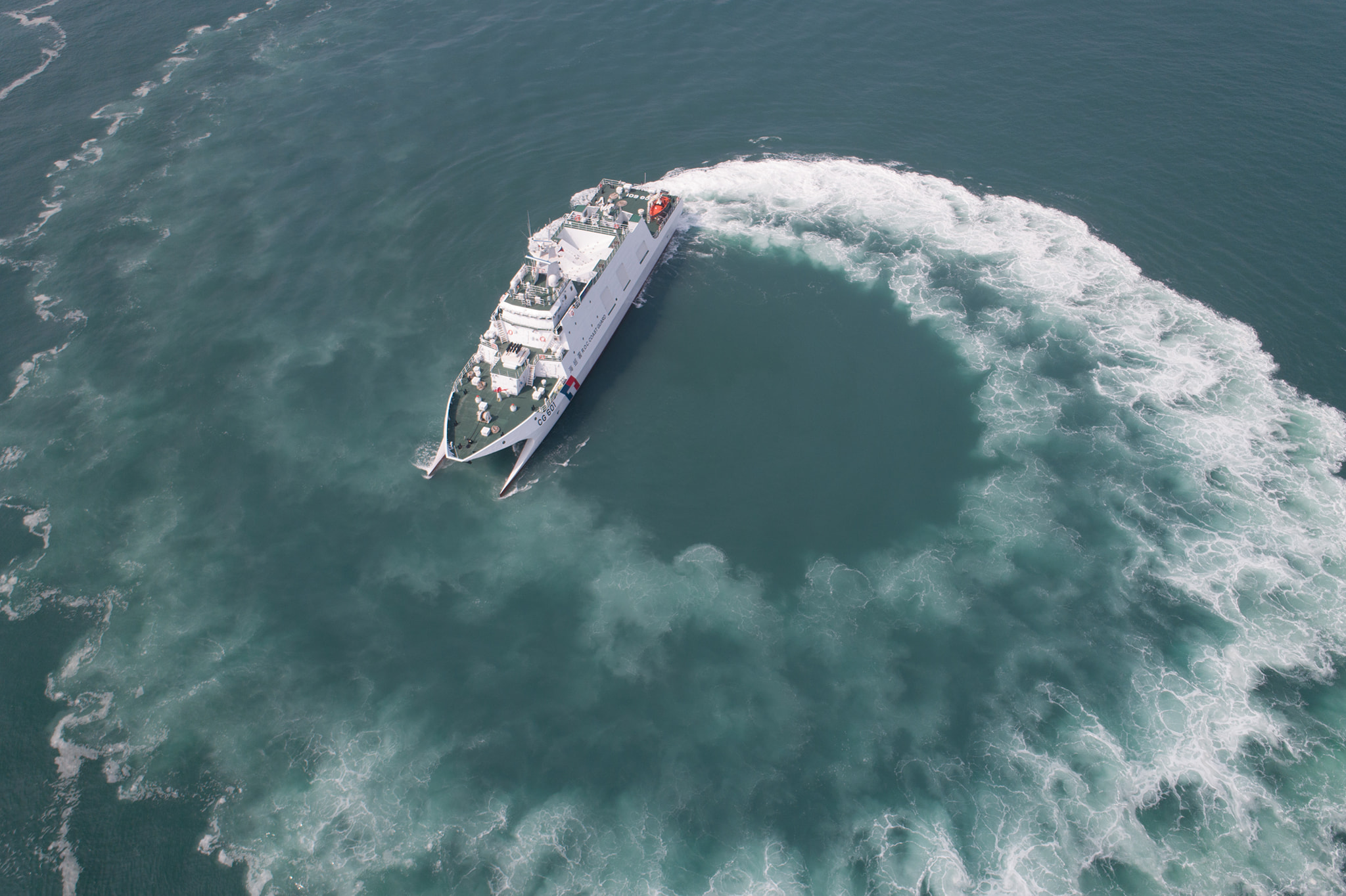
Anping (CG-601) maneuvering

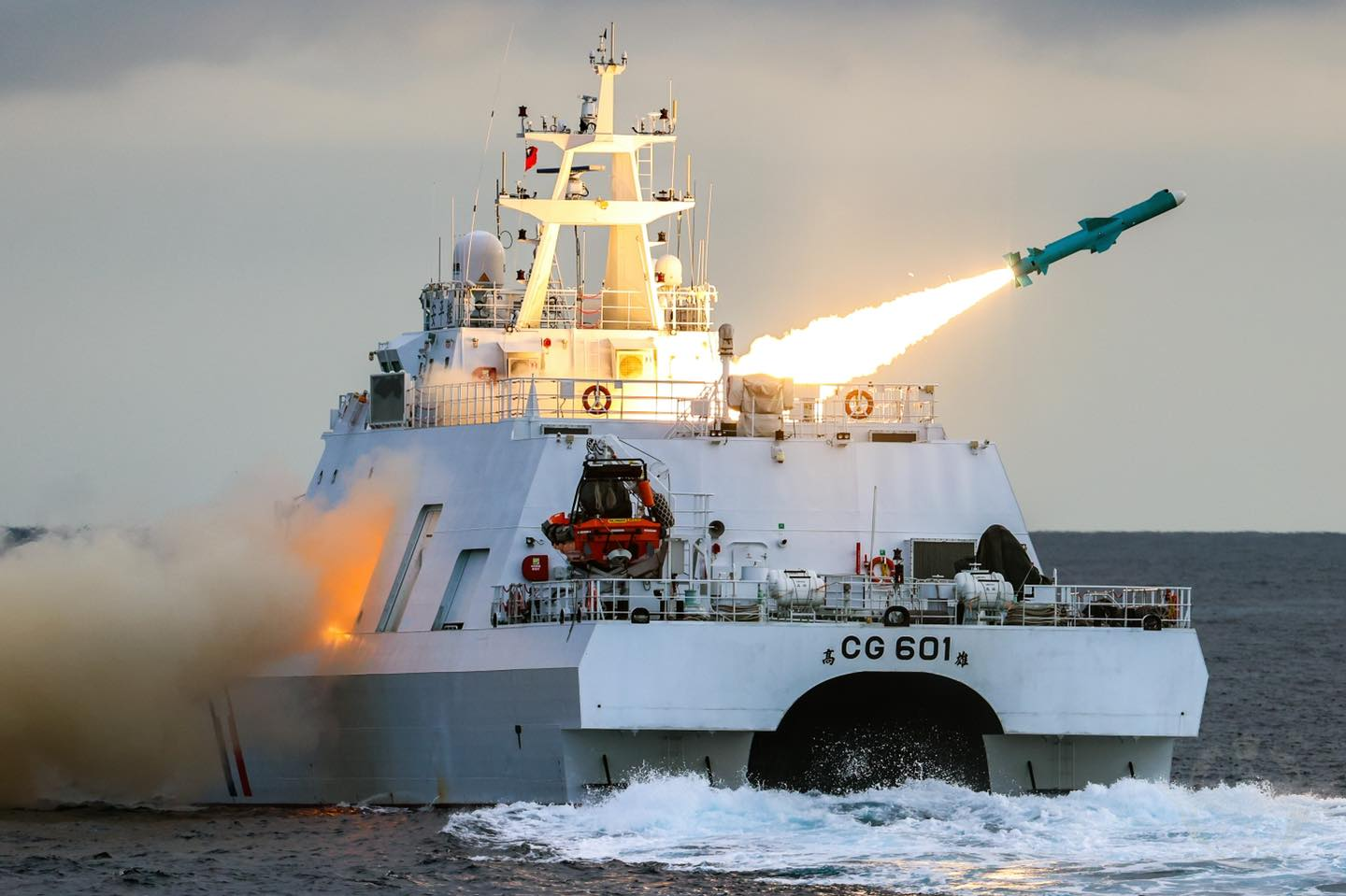
Anping (CG-601) launches Hsiung Feng II anti-ship missiles

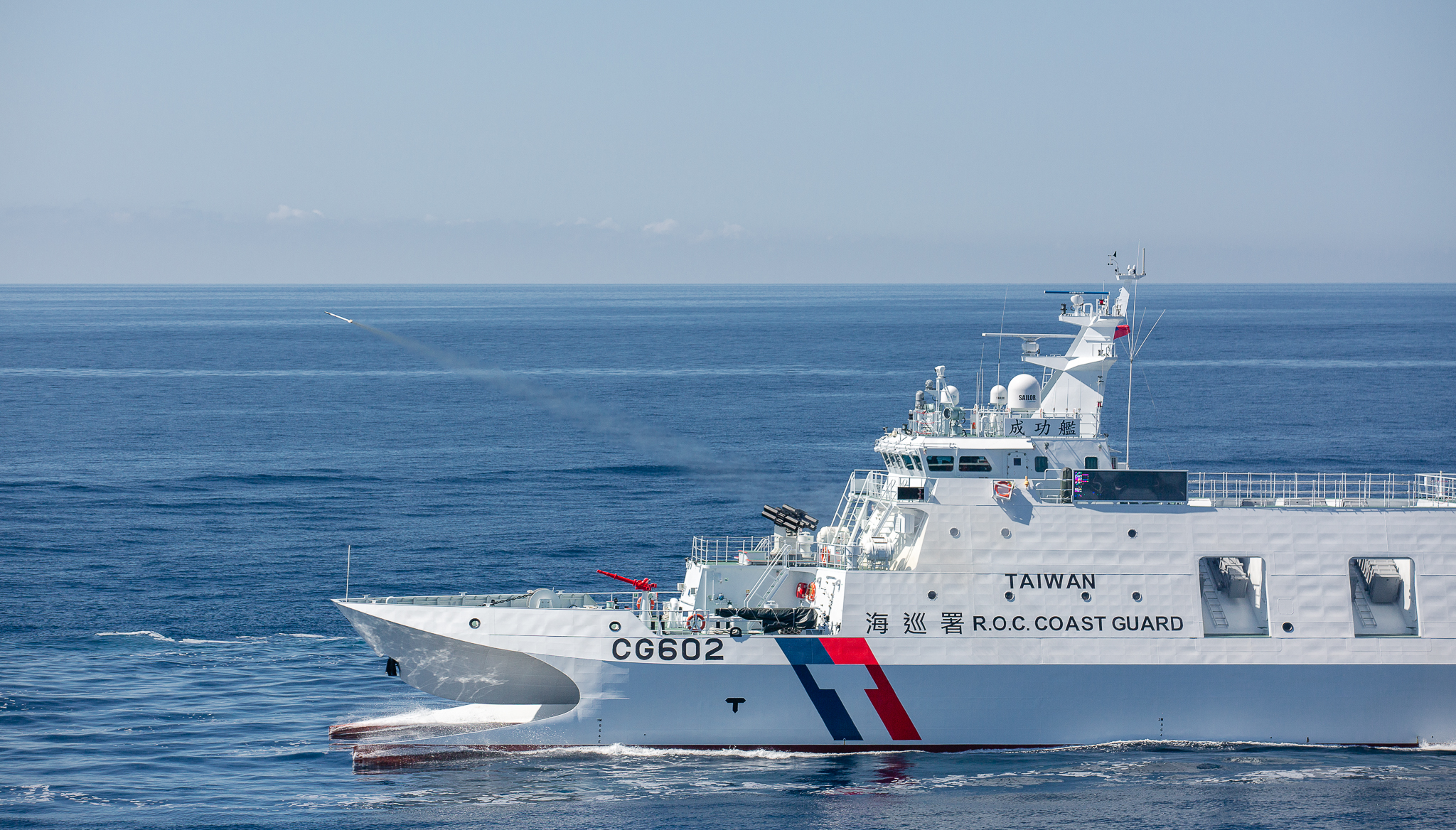
Cheng Kung (CG-602) using its NCSIST 2.75in rockets remote weapon station

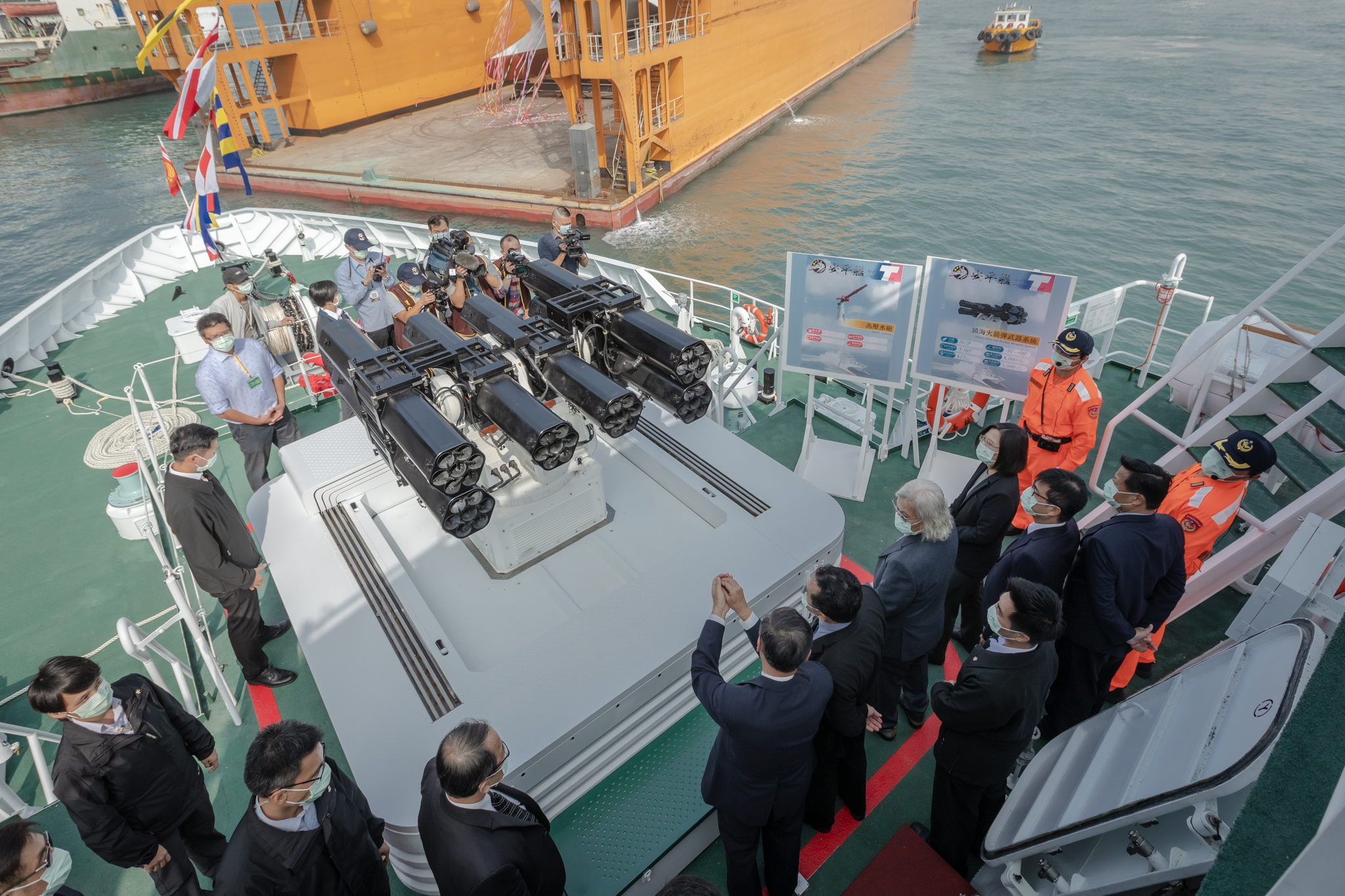
Anping class onboard multi-barrel Zhenhai rocket system

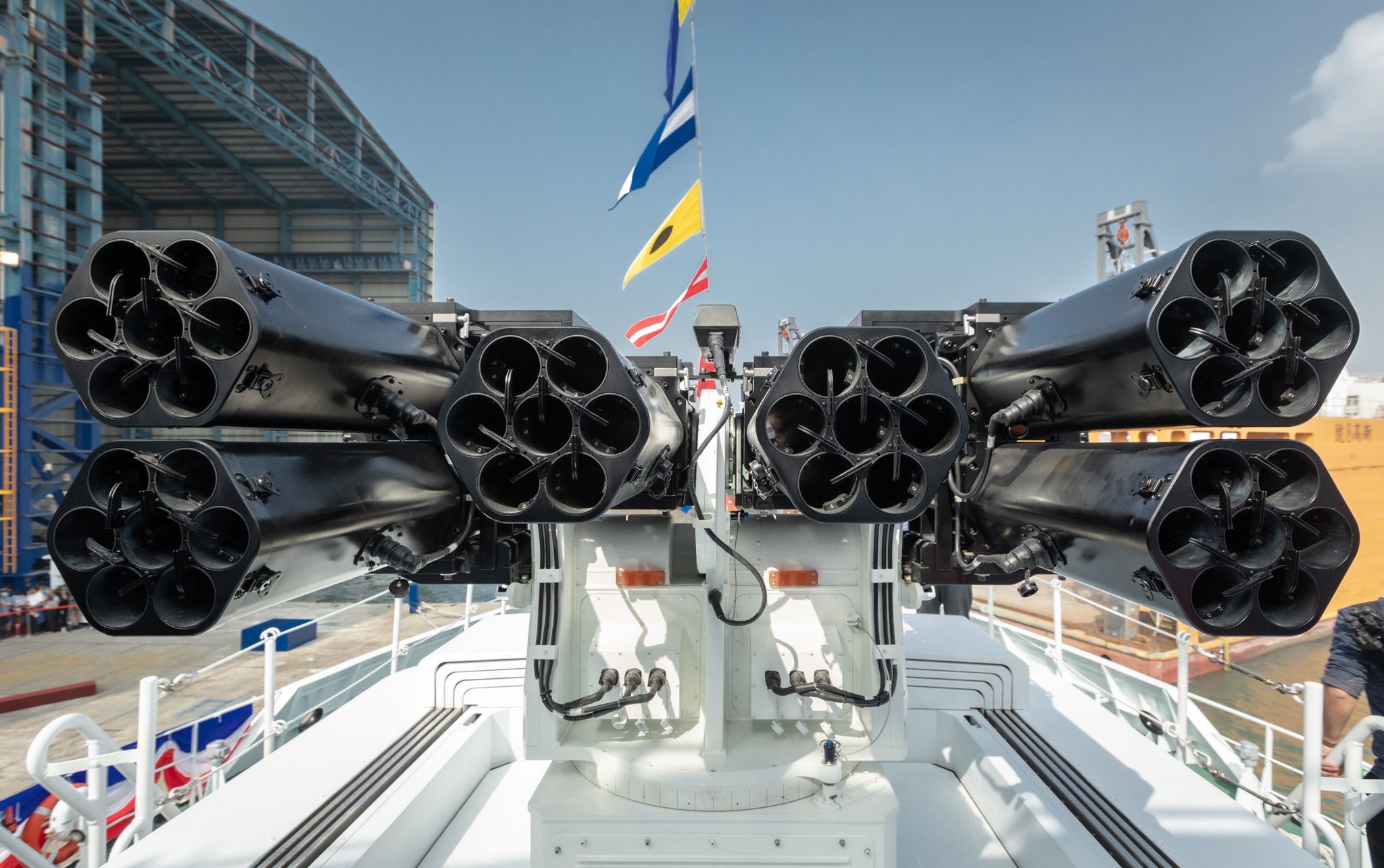
NCSIST 2.75in rockets remote weapon station

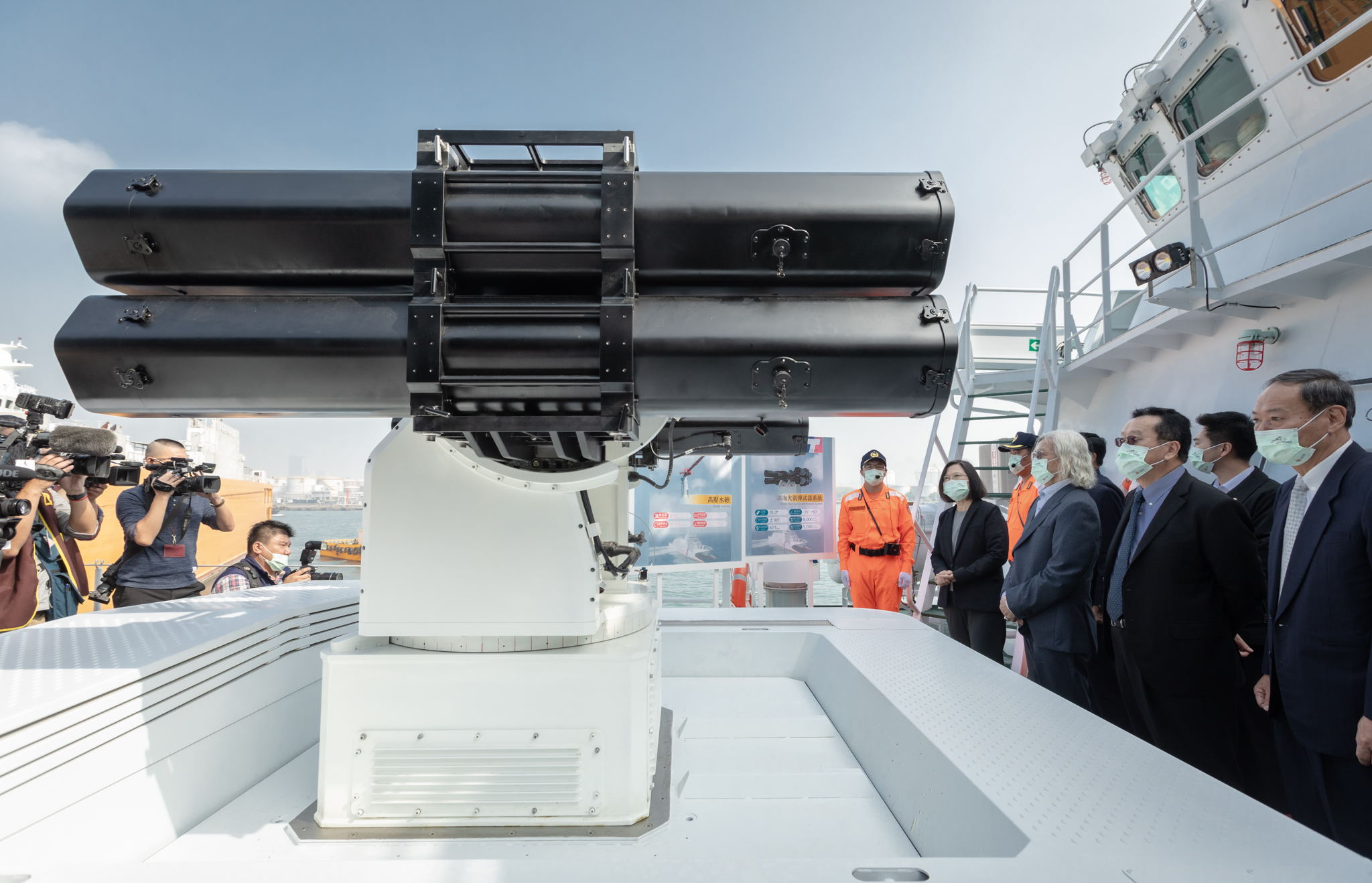
NCSIST 2.75in rockets remote weapon station (side)

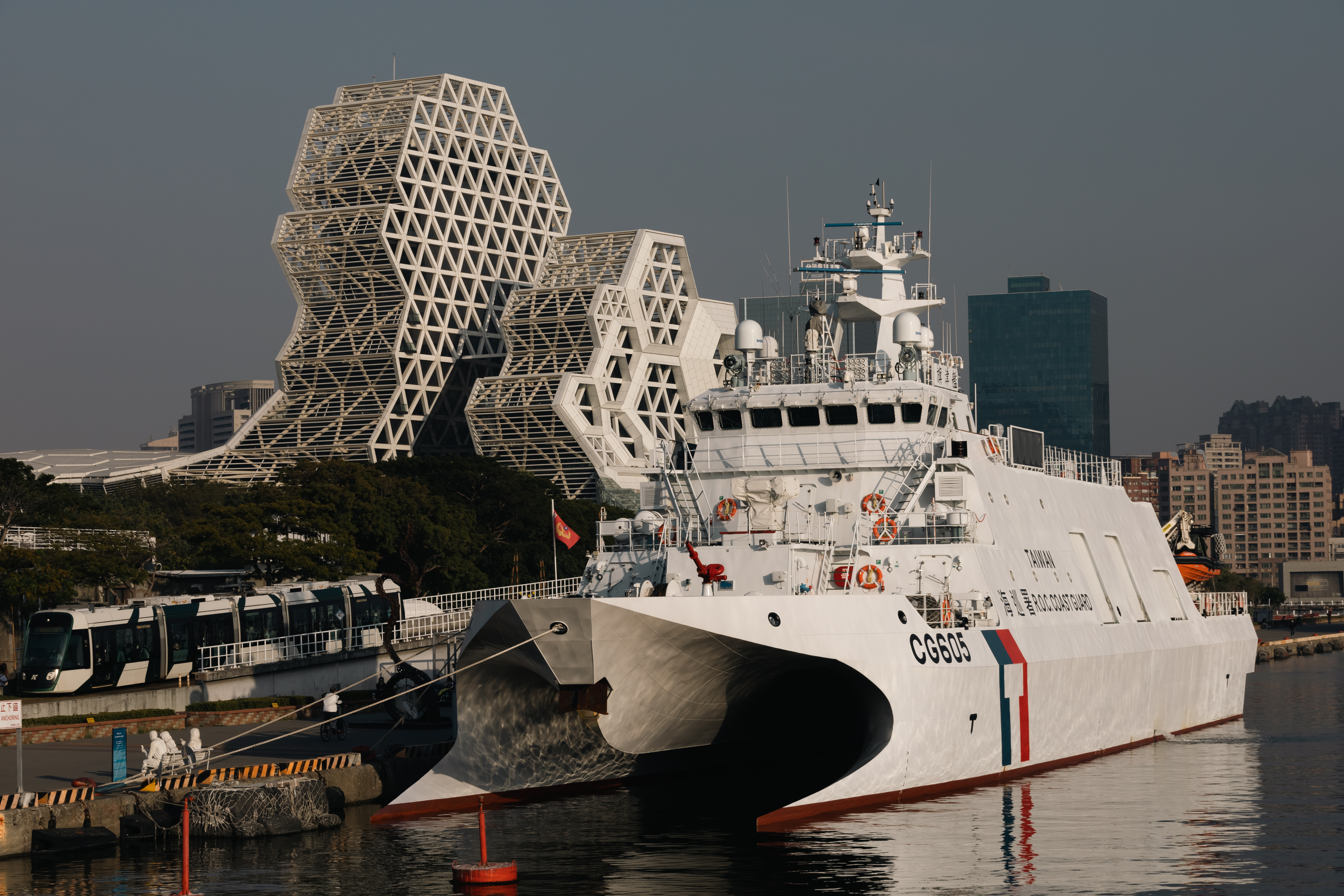
CG605 in front of the Kaohsiung Music Center

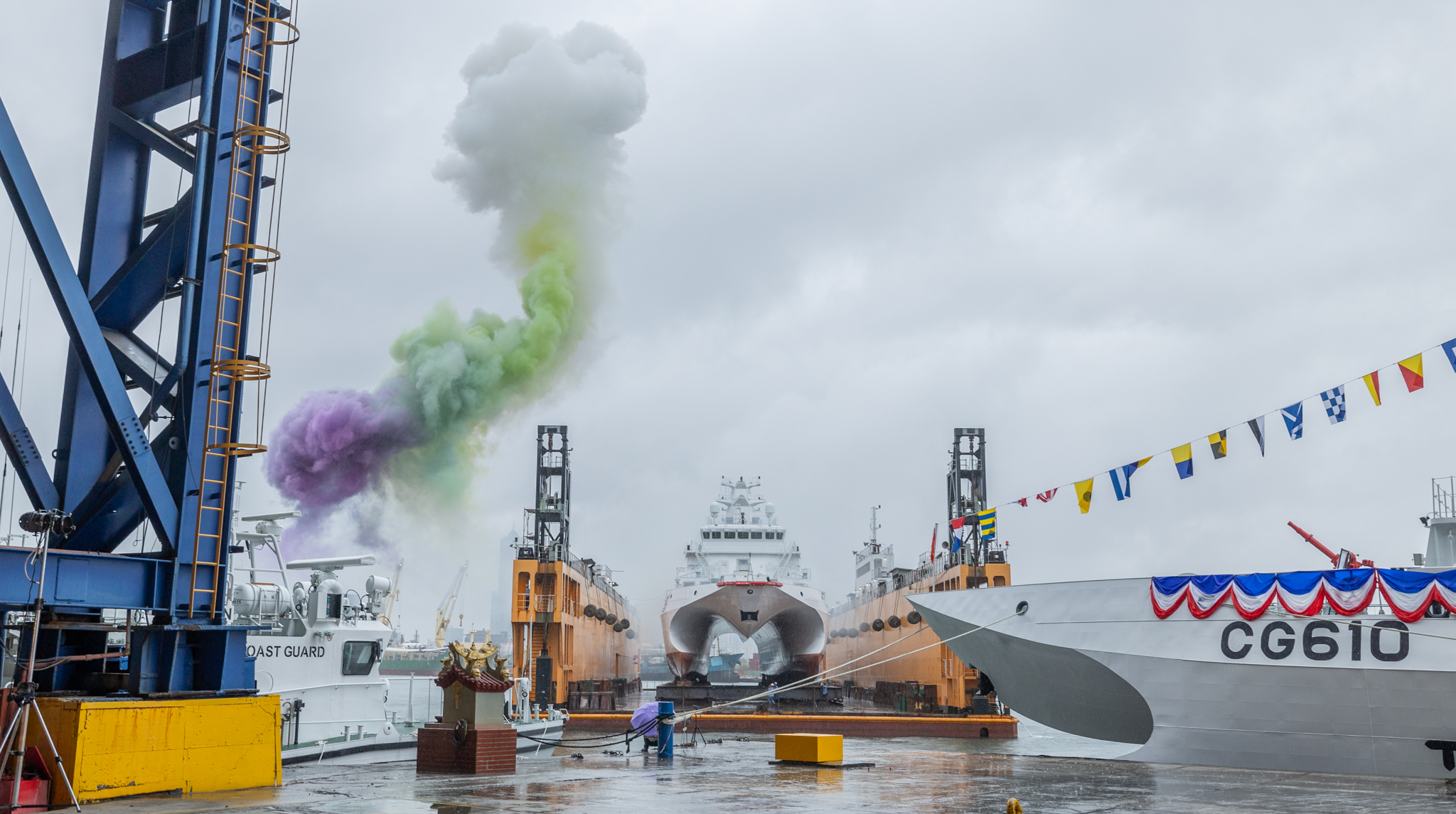
CG611 launch ceremony with CG610 to the right at pierside

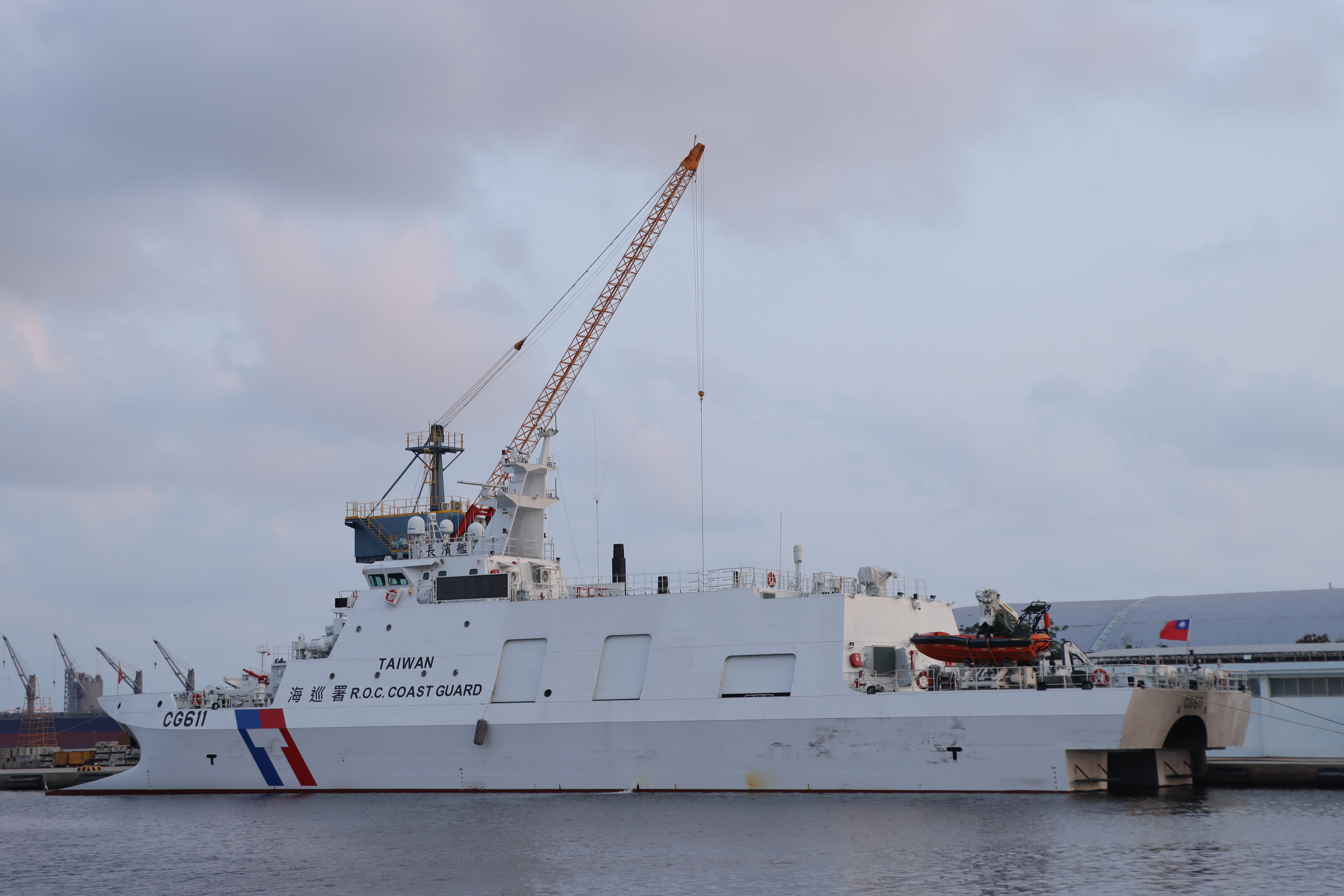
CG611 pierside

== See also ==
- Chiayi-class patrol vessel
- Yilan-class patrol vessel
- Miaoli-class patrol vessel
