= Chiayi-class patrol vessel =

Taiwan offshore patrol vessel

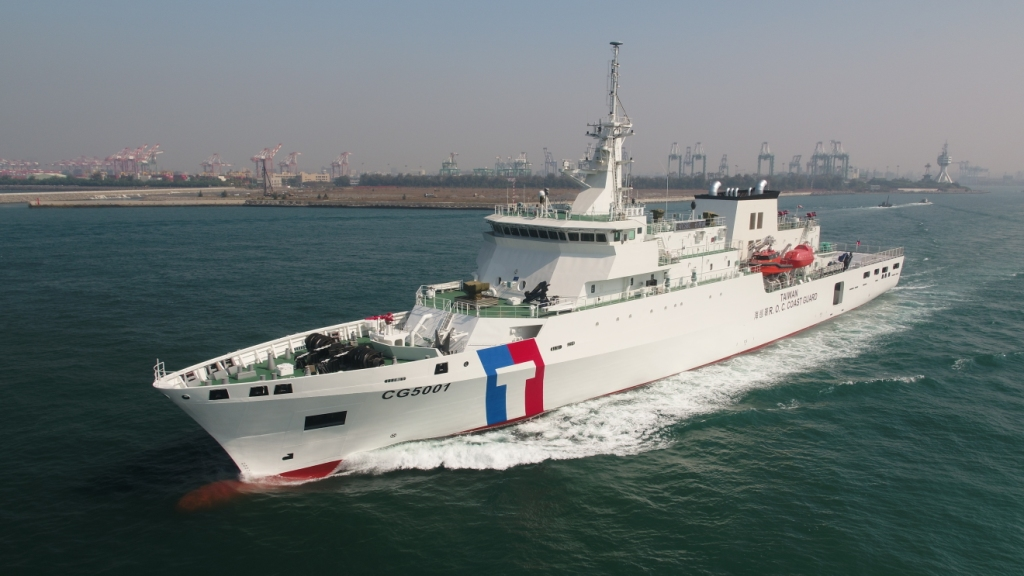
- CG 5001 Chiayi

Class overview
- Builders: CSBC Corporation, Taiwan
- Operators: Coast Guard Administration
- Built: 2018-Present
- Planned: 4
- Completed: 4
- Active: 4

General characteristics
- Type: Large patrol vessel
- Displacement: 5,044 tons
- Length: 125m
- Beam: 16.5m
- Speed: 24 knots
- Range: >10,000 nautical miles
- Armament: 1 X NCSIST 2.75in rockets remote weapon station, 2 X 20mm cannon remote weapon station, 3 X water cannons
- Aircraft carried: UH-60/S-70C
- Aviation facilities: Hangar
- Notes: Contract is NT$11.74 billion (US$392 million) for the delivery of all four vessels

The Chiayi-class patrol vessel is a heavy patrol vessel of the Coast Guard Administration of Taiwan. The design is based on Fincantieri Vard Marine's VARD 7 125 offshore patrol vessel design. Four ships are planned. All four are planned to be constructed by CSBC Corporation, Taiwan.

The class has a helipad and hangar which can accommodate a UH-60 Black Hawk helicopter. It is equipped with a medical center with a negative pressure area, a surgery suite, and an X-ray facility.

== History ==
The procurement is part of a decade long Coast Guard shipbuilding project with a projected budget of NT$42.6 billion ($1.4 billion). The budgeted cost of the four 4,000 ton patrol vessels is NT$ 11.74 billion (US$392 million). Delivery of all four is planned to be completed by 2025.

The first vessel of the class, Chiayi (CG5001), was launched in June 2020. The R.O.C President of Taiwan Tsai Ing-wen presided over the launch. The Coast Guard took possession of Chiayi in April 2021.

The second vessel, Hsinchu (CG5002), was delivered in April 2022.

== Vessels ==
A total of 4 vessels are planned.

- Chiayi (CG5001), launched in June 2020, commissioned and delivered in April 2021.
- Hsinchu (CG5002), launched in April 2021, commissioned and delivered in December 2022.
- Yunlin (CG5003), launched in December 2022, commissioned and delivered in March 2024.
- Taipei (CG5005), launched in March 2024, and delivered in September 2025.

== Gallery ==
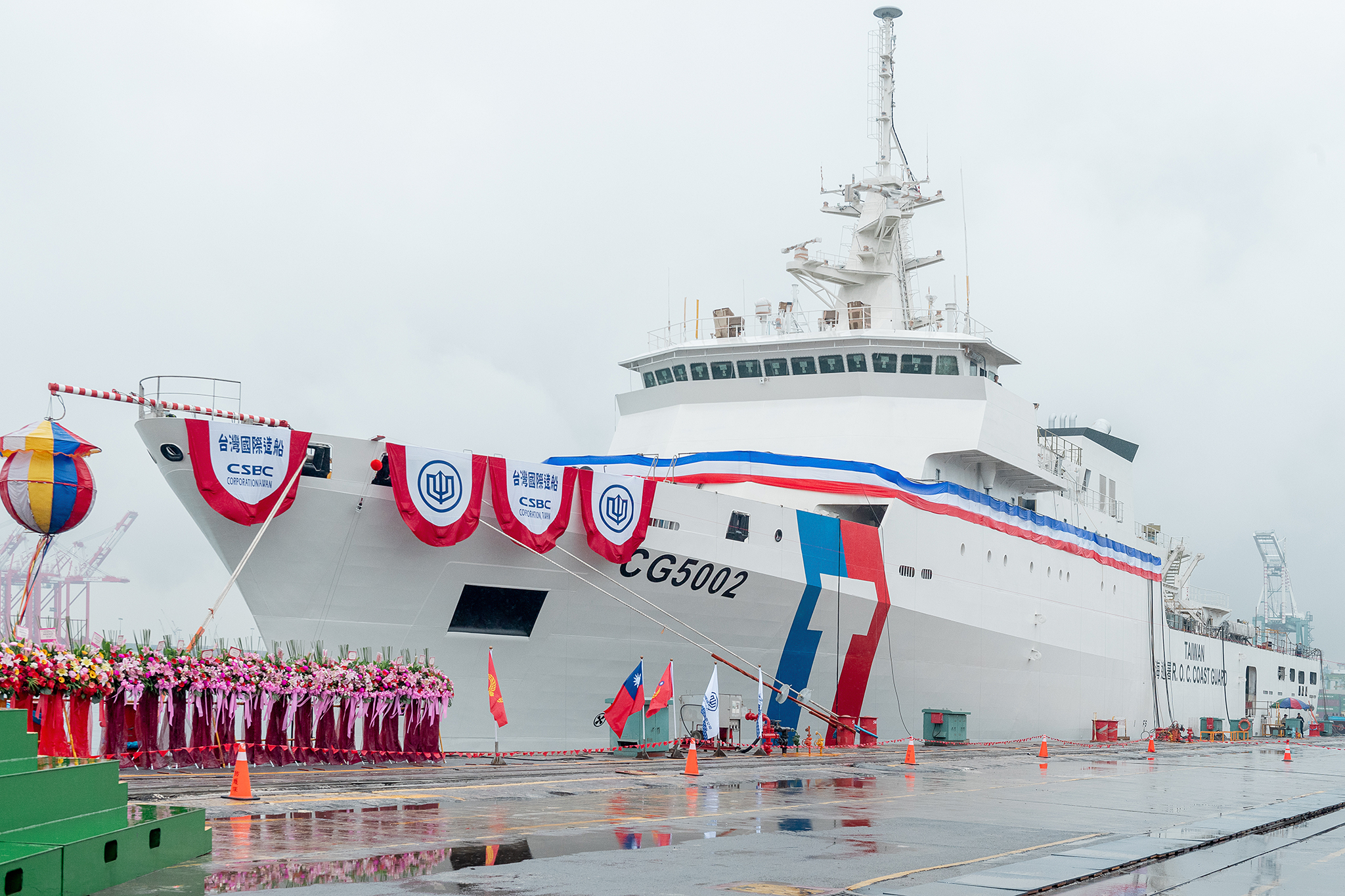
CG 5002 Hsinchu

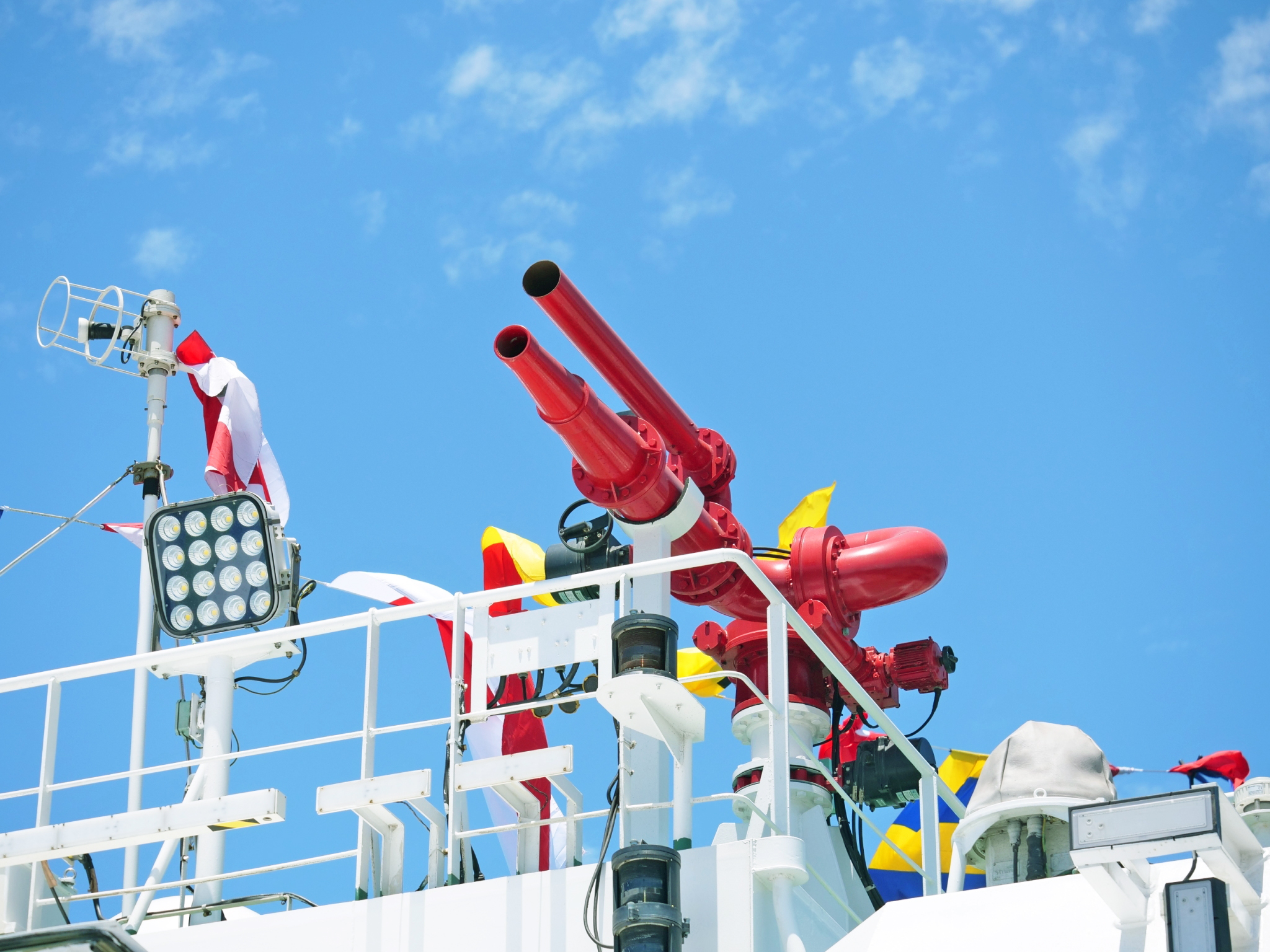
Water cannon on Hsinchu

Medical berths aboard Hsinchu

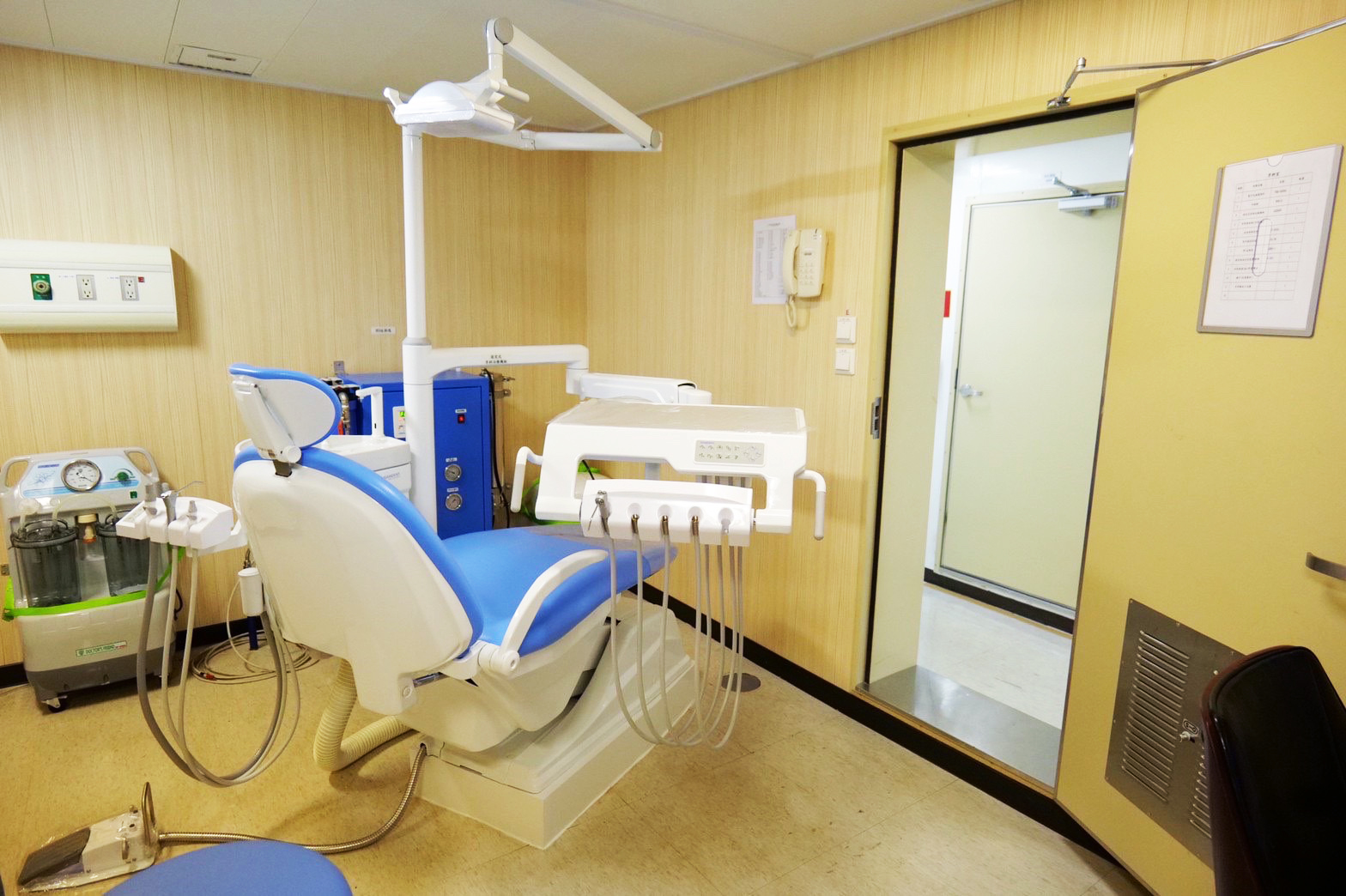
Dental clinic aboard Hsinchu

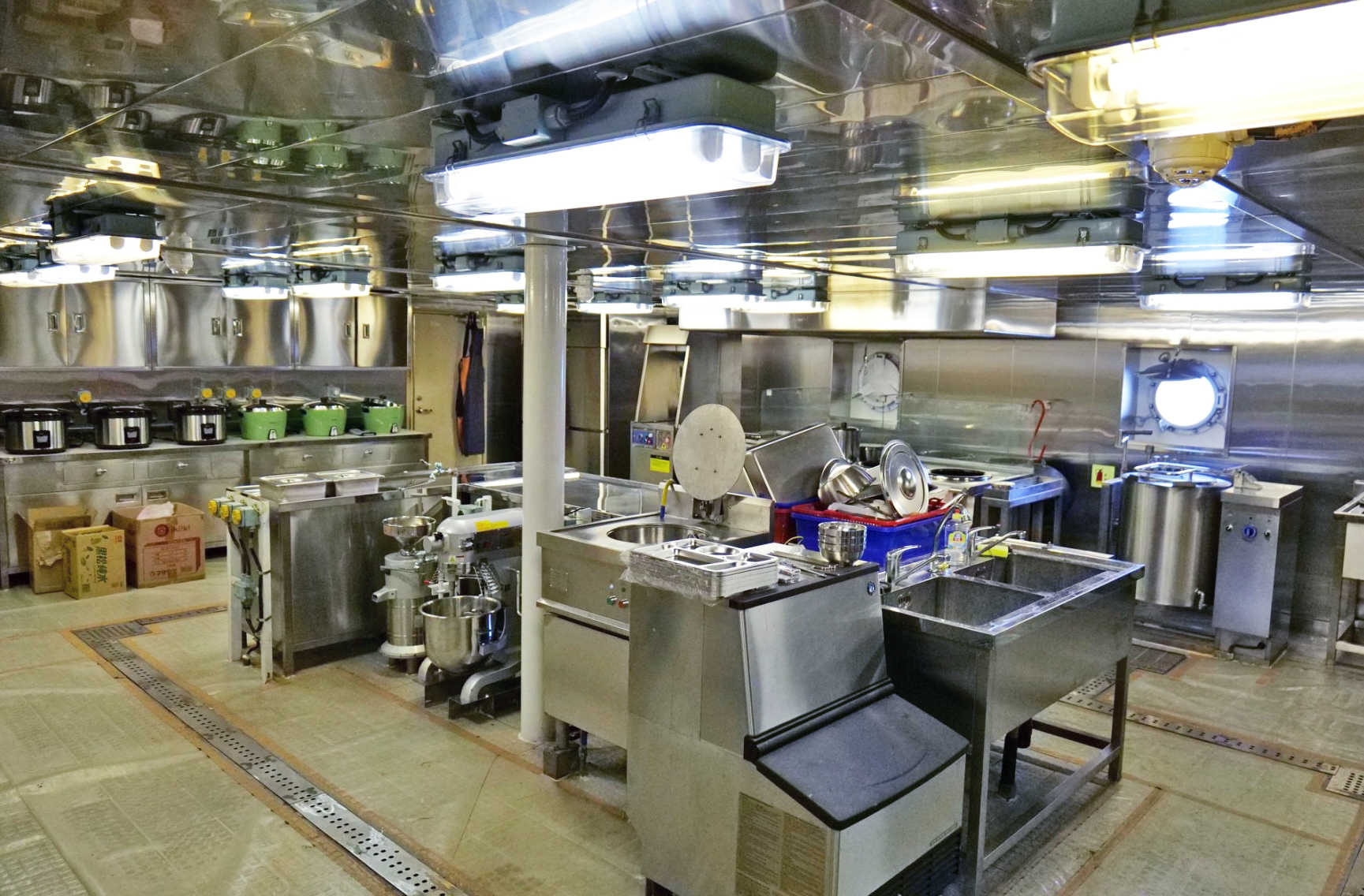
Galley aboard Hsinchu

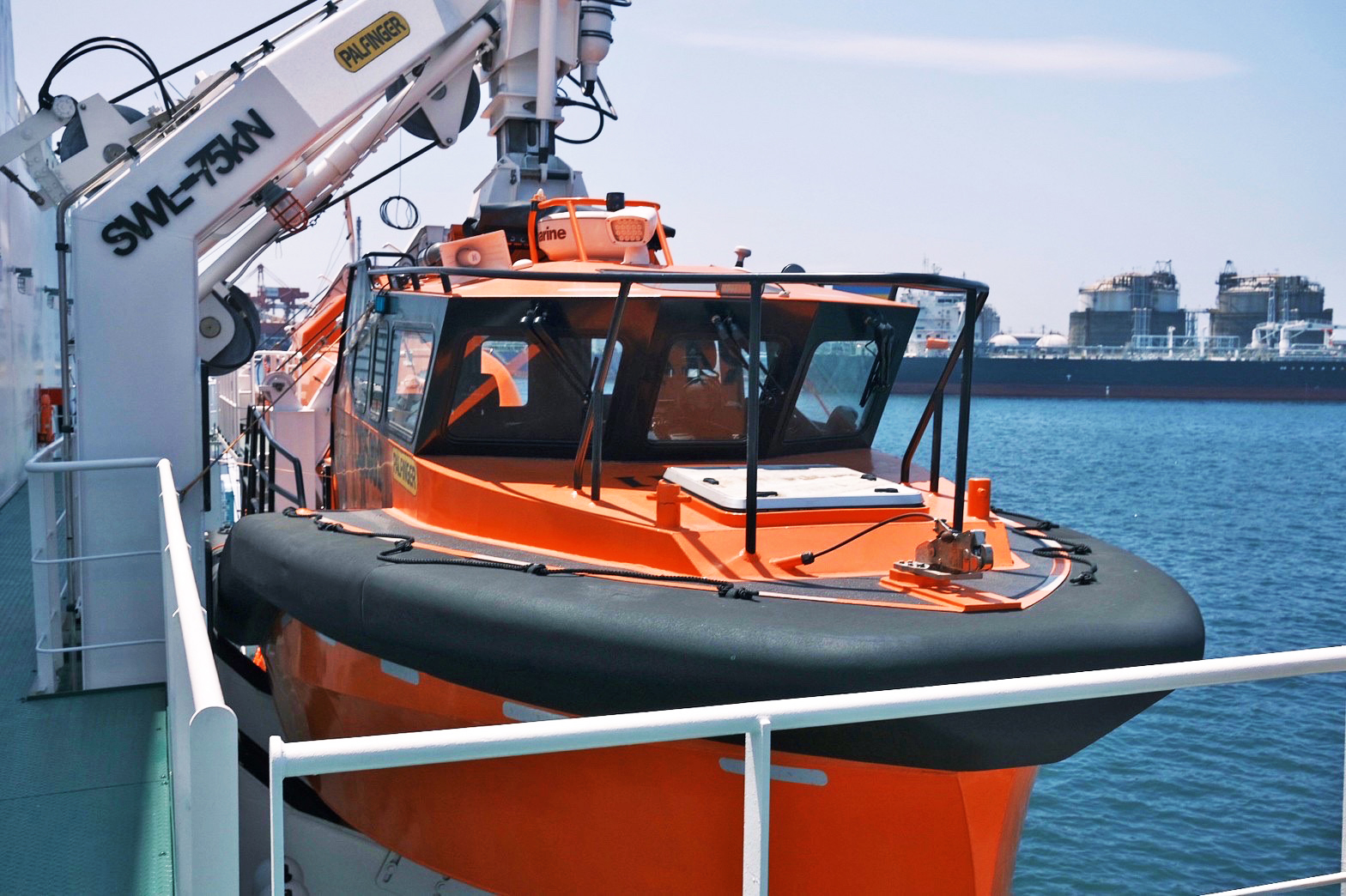
Tender aboard Hsinchu

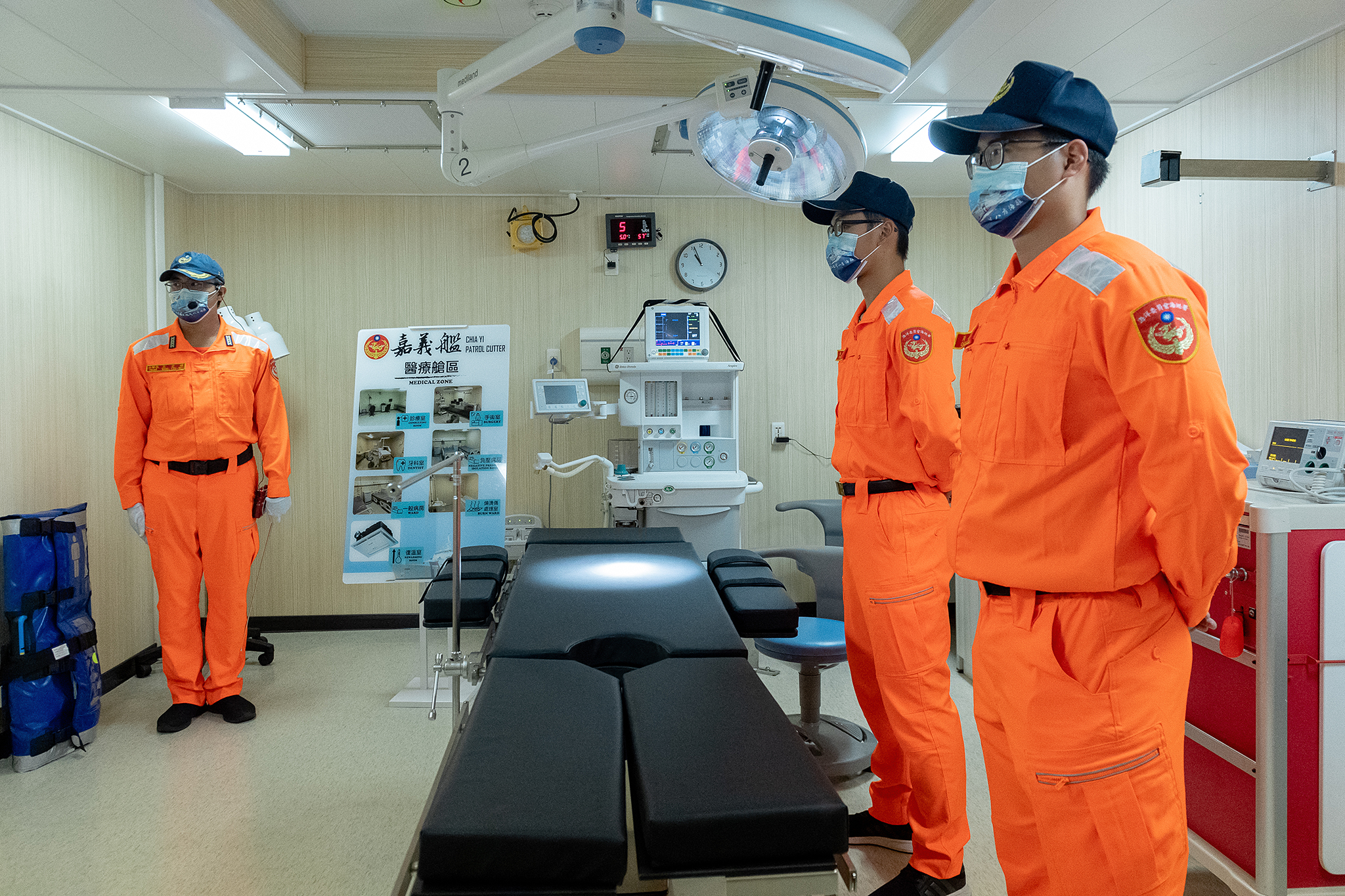
Surgical center aboard Chiayi

== See also ==
- Anping-class offshore patrol vessel
- Cheng Kung-class frigate
- Kang Ding-class frigate
- Heritage-class cutter
- Miaoli-class patrol vessel
- Yilan-class patrol vessel
