= Miaoli-class patrol vessel =

Class of ship in service with the Taiwan Coast Guard

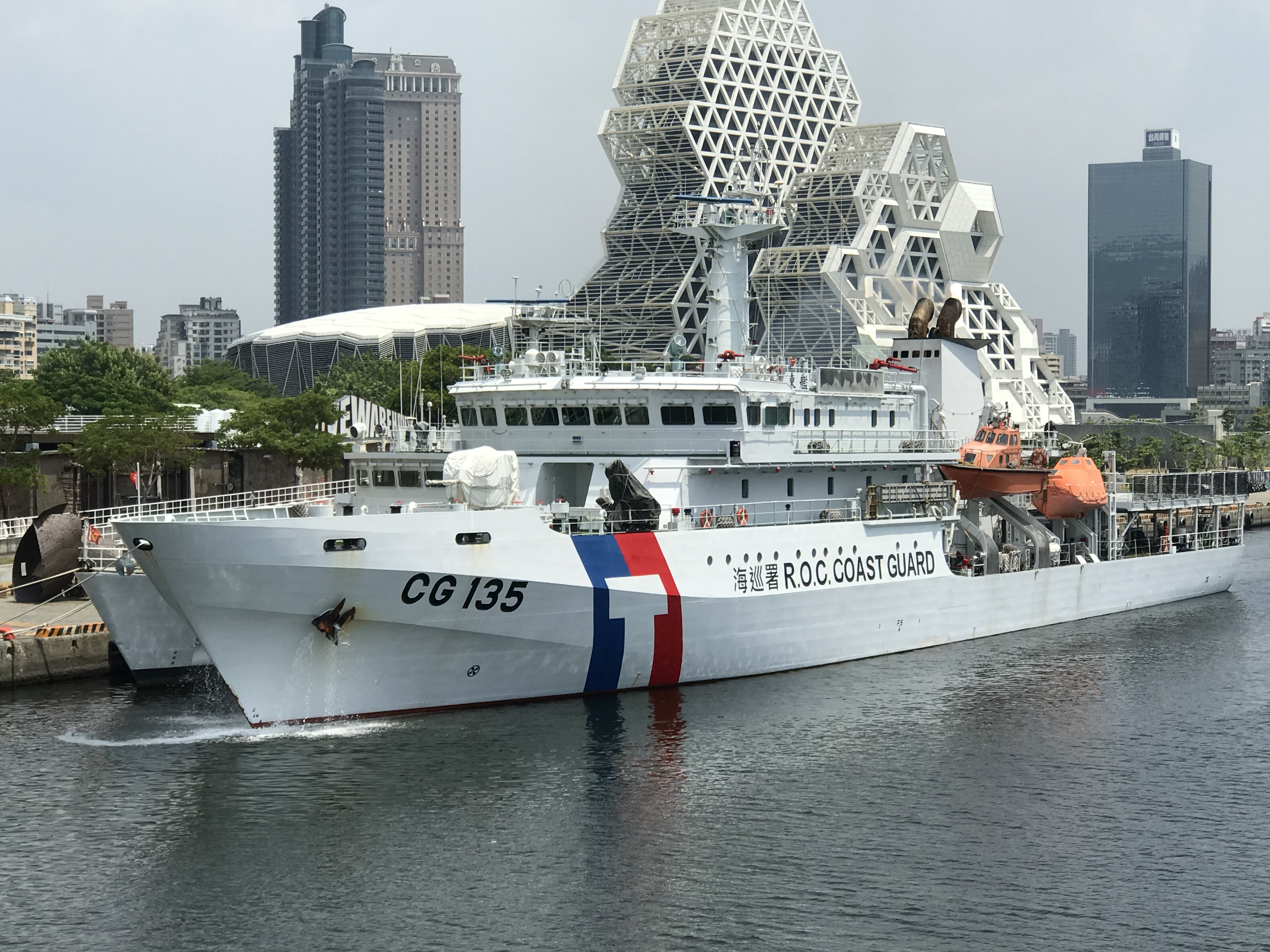
- Pingtung CG135

Class overview
- Completed: 4
- Active: 4

General characteristics
- Type: Patrol vessel
- Displacement: 1,899 tons
- Length: 87.6m
- Beam: 12.8m
- Propulsion: 7280KW x 2
- Speed: 24 knots
- Range: 6,000nm
- Armament: 40mm cannon, 20mm cannon, two T75 machine guns, and water cannon.

The Miaoli-class patrol vessel is a class of patrol vessels of the Coast Guard Administration of Taiwan.

The vessels are armed with 40mm guns and water cannons with an effective range of 120m.

== History ==
The Taitung and Pingtung were commissioned on September 21, 2016, by Taiwanese President Tsai Ing-wen.

== Vessels ==
- Miaoli CG131
- Taoyuan CG132
- Taitung CG133
- Pingtung CG135

== Gallery ==
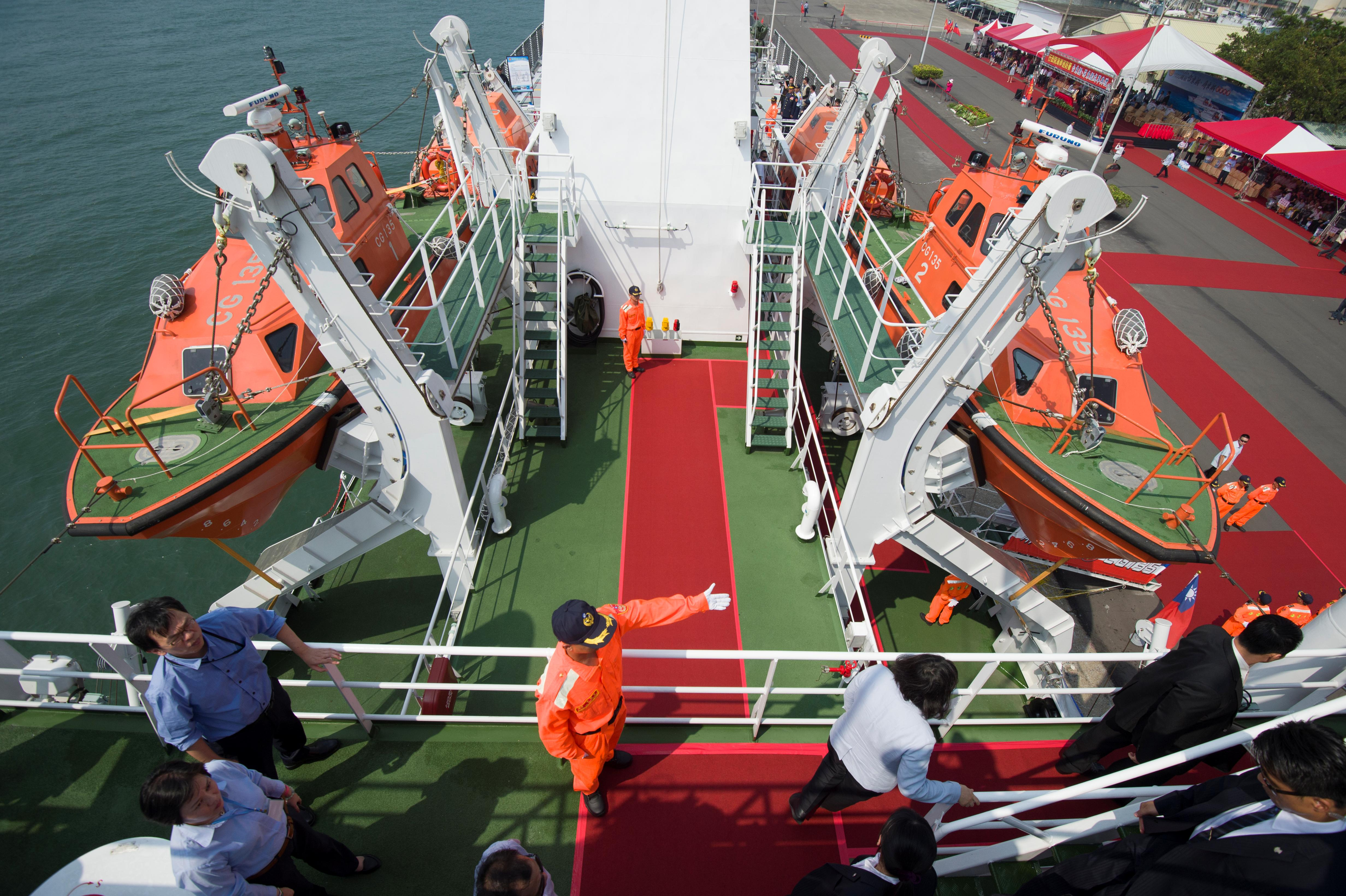
Midships view of CG 135 Pingtung

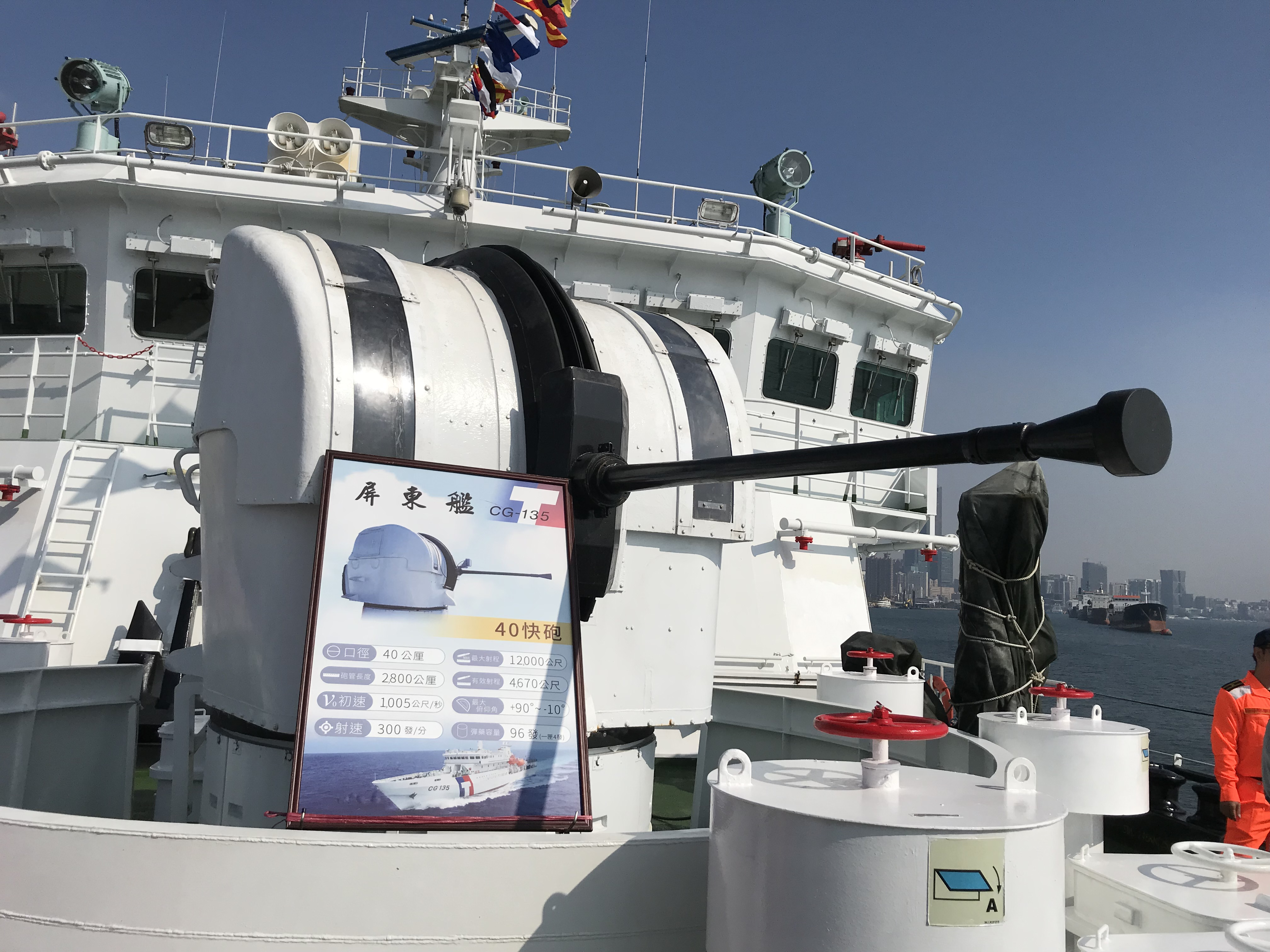
40mm Bofors main gun of CG 135 Pingtung

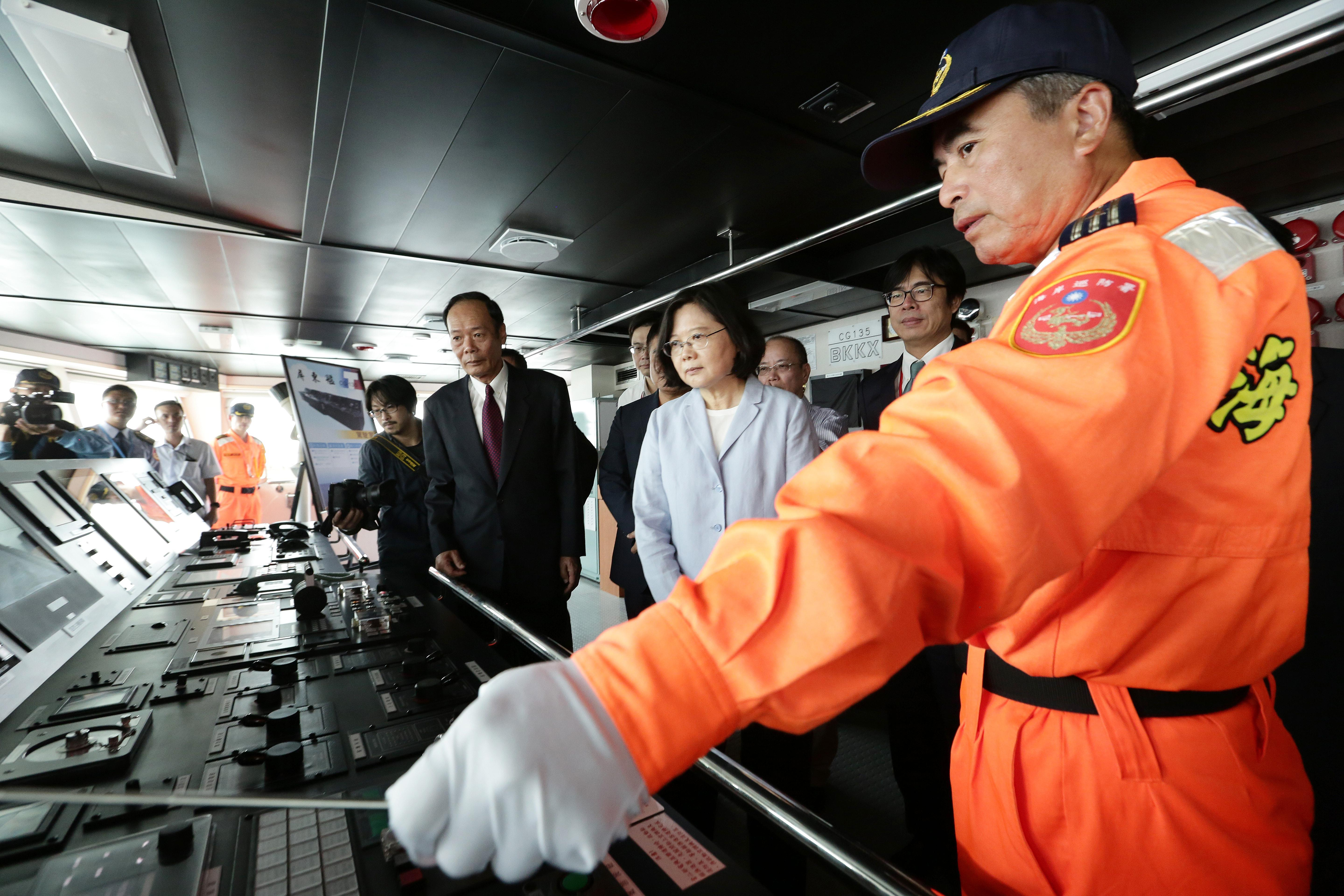
Bridge of CG 135 Pingtung being inspected by then President Tsai Ing-wen

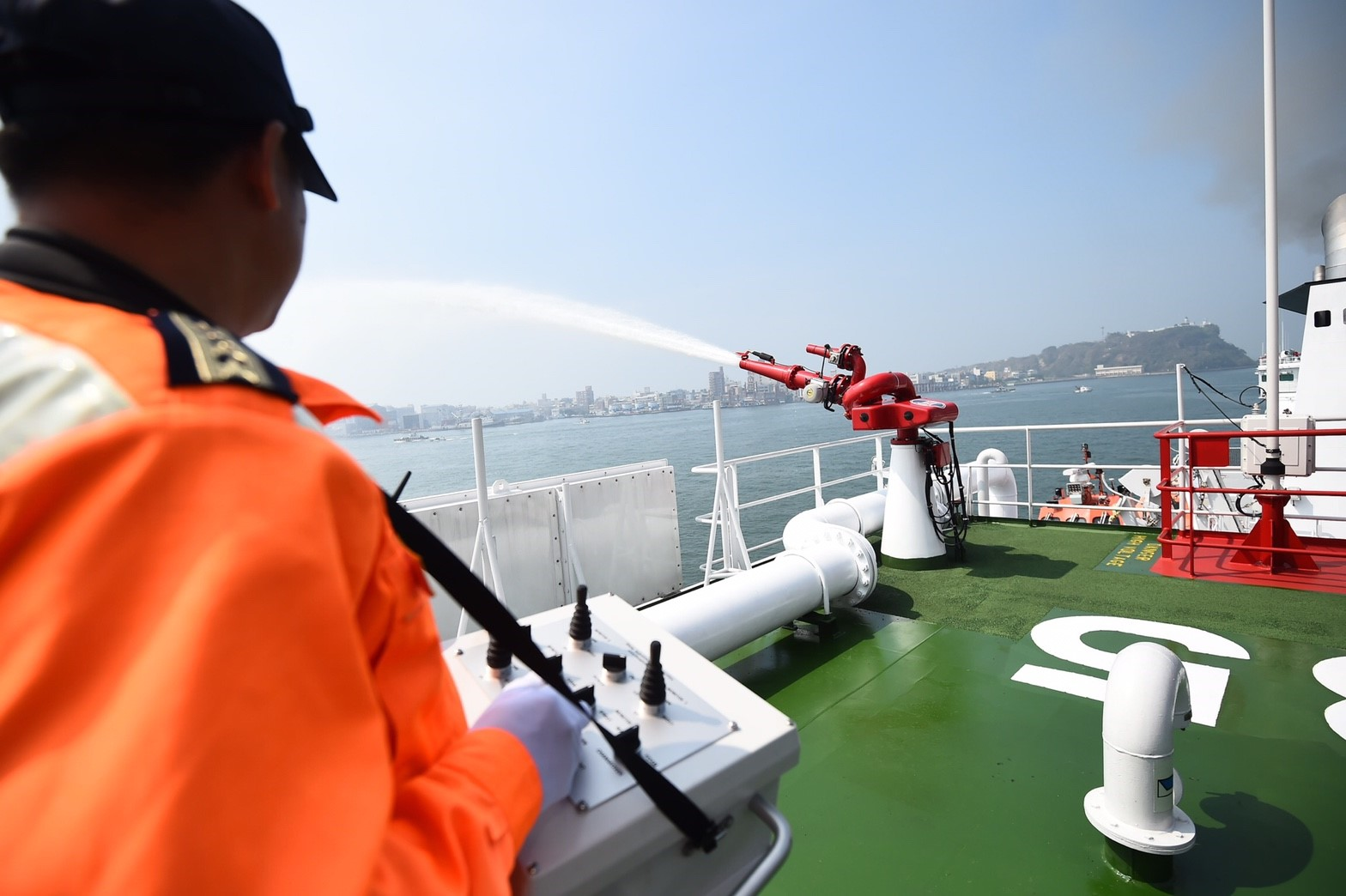
Water cannon aboard CG 135 Pingtung

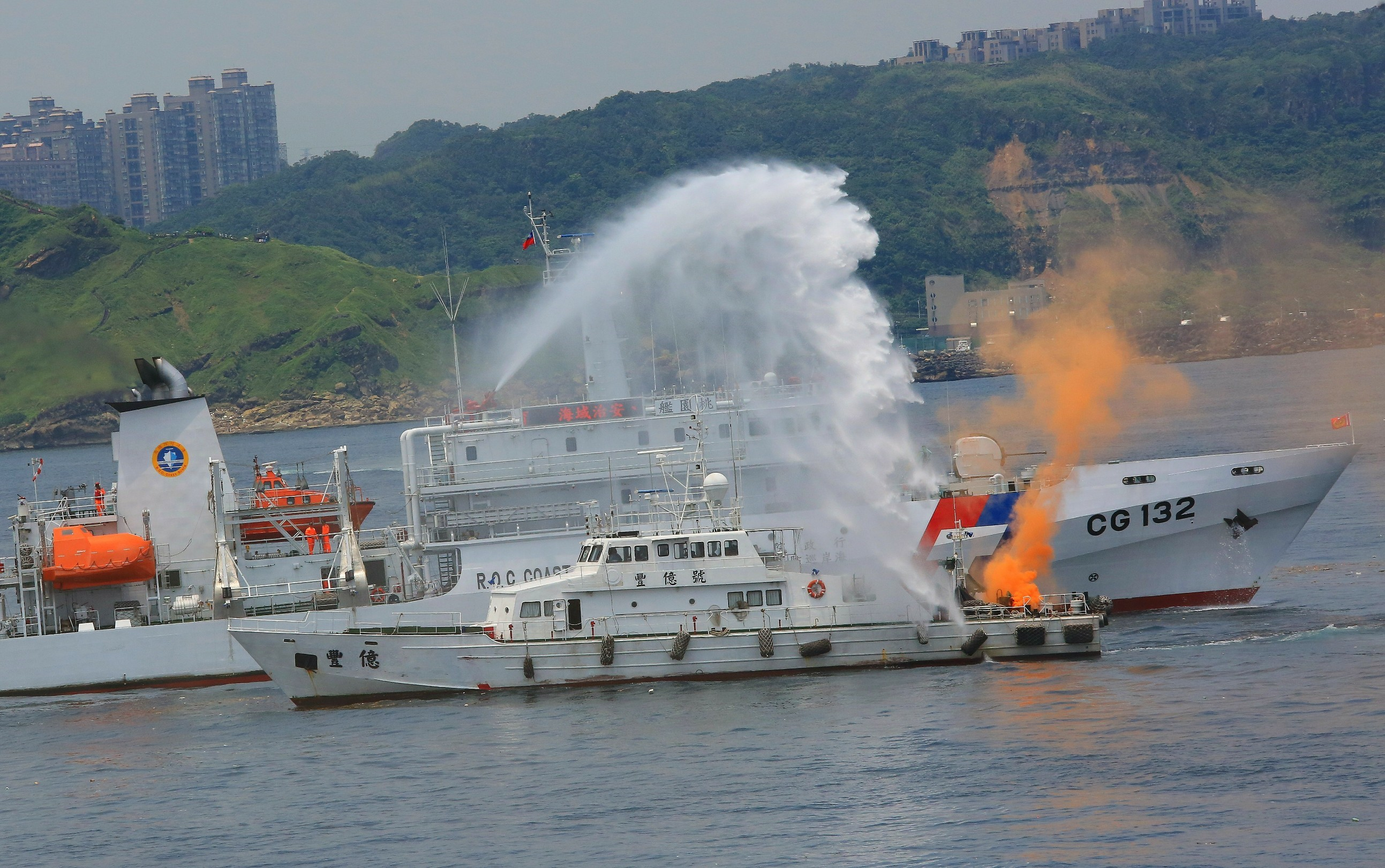
CG 132 Taoyuan participates in an exerscise

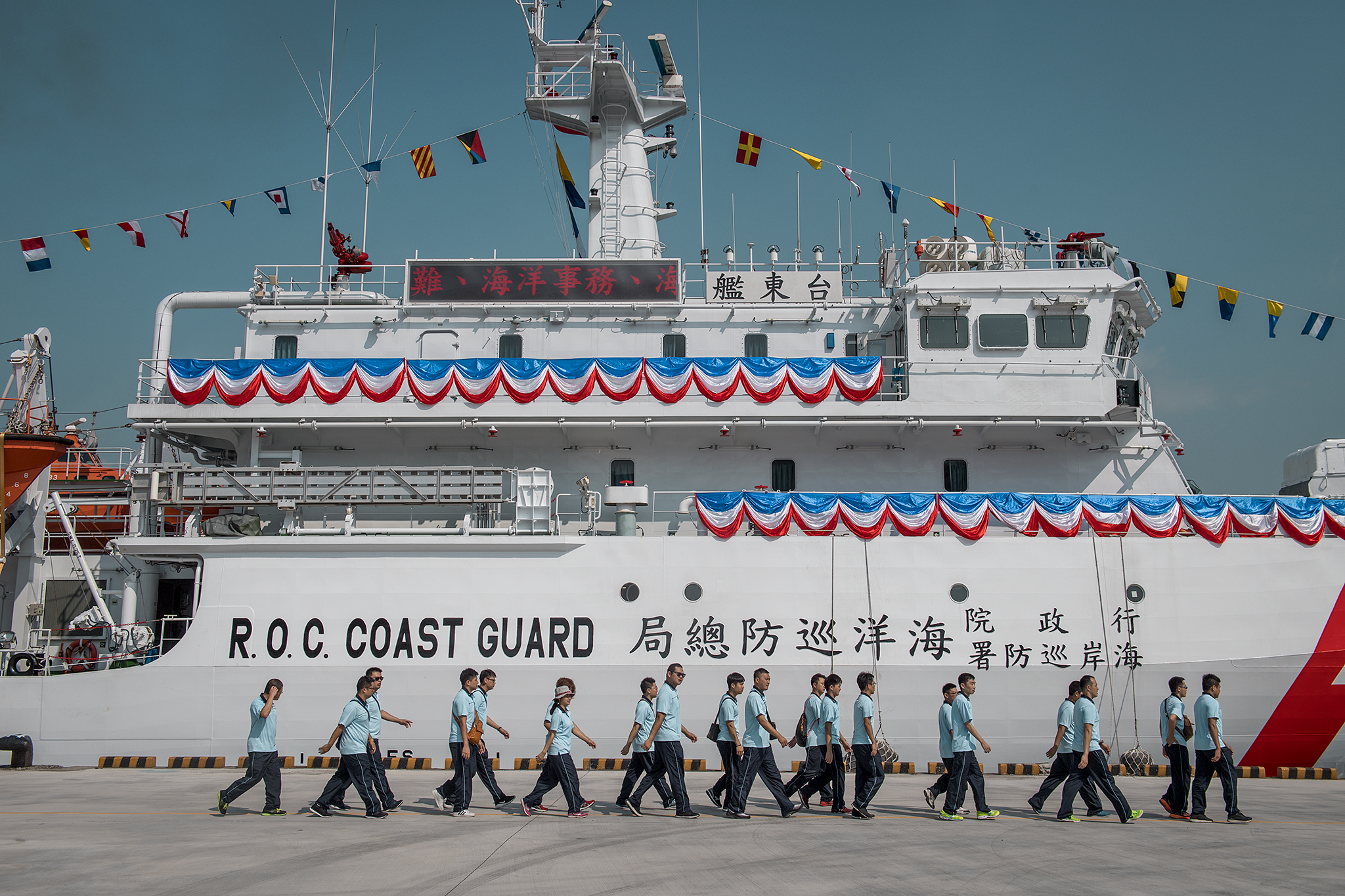
CG 133 Taitung pierside

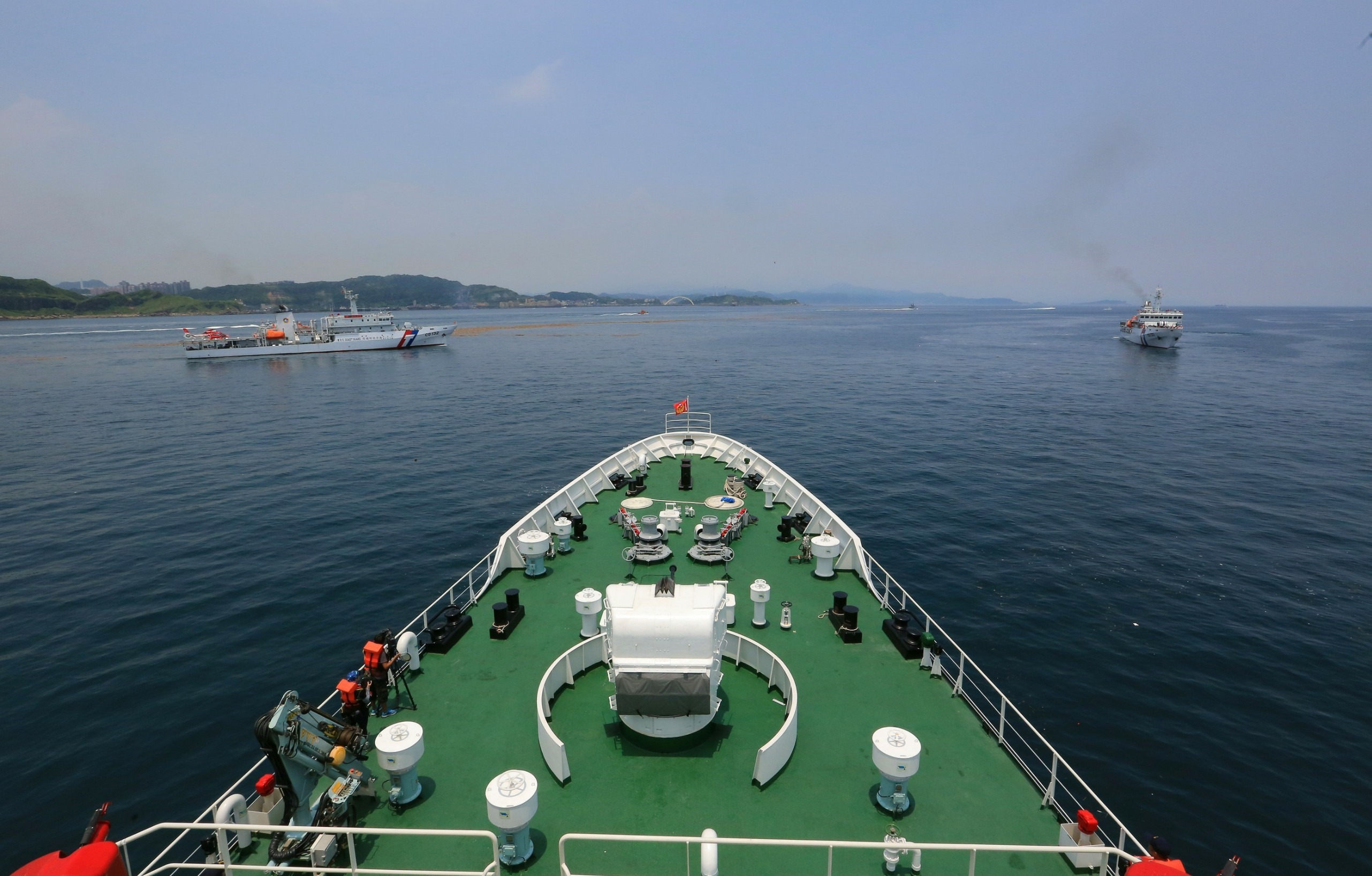
View forward from the bridge of a Miaoli-class patrol vessel with CG 132 Taoyuan at left and 133 Taitung at right

== See also ==
- Chiayi-class patrol vessel
- Anping-class offshore patrol vessel
- Yilan-class patrol vessel
