= NCSIST 2.75in rockets remote weapon station =

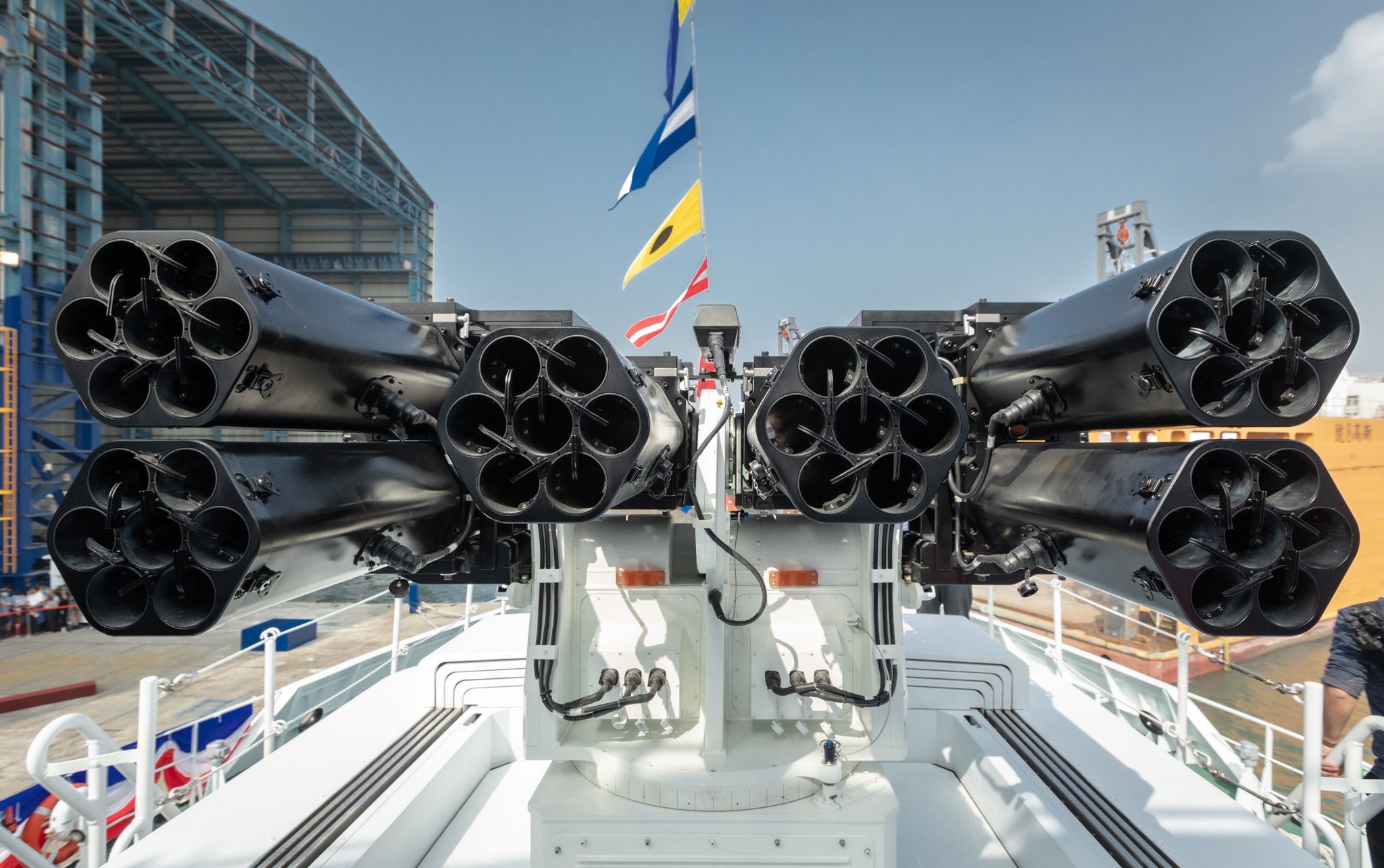
- System carried on Coast Guard Administration (Taiwan) vessel Anping-class offshore patrol vessel
- Type: Remote controlled weapon station
- Place of origin: Taiwan

Service history
- In service: since 2020
- Used by: Coast Guard Administration (Taiwan)

Production history
- Designer: National Chung-Shan Institute of Science and Technology
- Manufacturer: National Chung-Shan Institute of Science and Technology

Specifications
- Mass: 1,500 kilograms
- Shell: Hydra 70
- Shell weight: 2.4 kilograms
- Caliber: 2.75 inch
- Barrels: 7 cell / tube
- Elevation: -15~50 degrees
- Traverse: 330 degrees
- Effective firing range: 5,000 meters
- Maximum firing range: 10,000 meters

NCSIST 2.75in rockets remote weapon station is a Taiwanese remote weapon station produced by the National Chung-Shan Institute of Science and Technology (NCSIST) to launch Mk66 2.75inch rockets. The system is able to use multiple types of fuzing techniques to adapt to the needs of the user in both military and policing scenarios.

== History ==
During its development, engineers at NCSIST utilized experience gained during the development of the Kestrel ATM and XTR-101/102 systems. The team first displayed a system called the "Coastal Defense Rocket Artillery System" with 12 7-cell pods at Taipei Aerospace and Defense Exhibition 2015, but didn't receive any orders or much interest from the ROC Army. The system was set aside until the Coast Guard established a procurement plan for new vessels, which gave the team an opportunity to market the system. Due to a high need for 40mm guns, specifically the Bofors 40mm, there were guns available for the CGA. Therefore, the Coast Guard accepted a modified version of the prototype, with 6 pods instead of the original 12, for use on Anping and Chiayi-class OPVs.

== Design and development ==
The shipborne version debuted during the commissioning ceremony of the Anping-class offshore patrol vessel, where it was given the name "鎮海火箭彈系統" in traditional Chinese. Having little need for massive fire projection, the Coast Guard version is only armed with 6 launch pods, each containing 7 rockets. Available warheads are "high explosive", "anti-armor", and "area destruction", alongside a later introduced version: "lighting (flares)" for SAR missions. The flares can last more than five minutes, to support continuous operations at night.

The first batch of the RWS experienced issues, having only a low operable elevation adjustment, due to the overall height of the system. Later, starting with the forth Anping-class OPV, a new version featuring an integrated cupola and elevated pedestal, which expanded the possible operating scenarios and elevation, was installed.

== Gallery ==
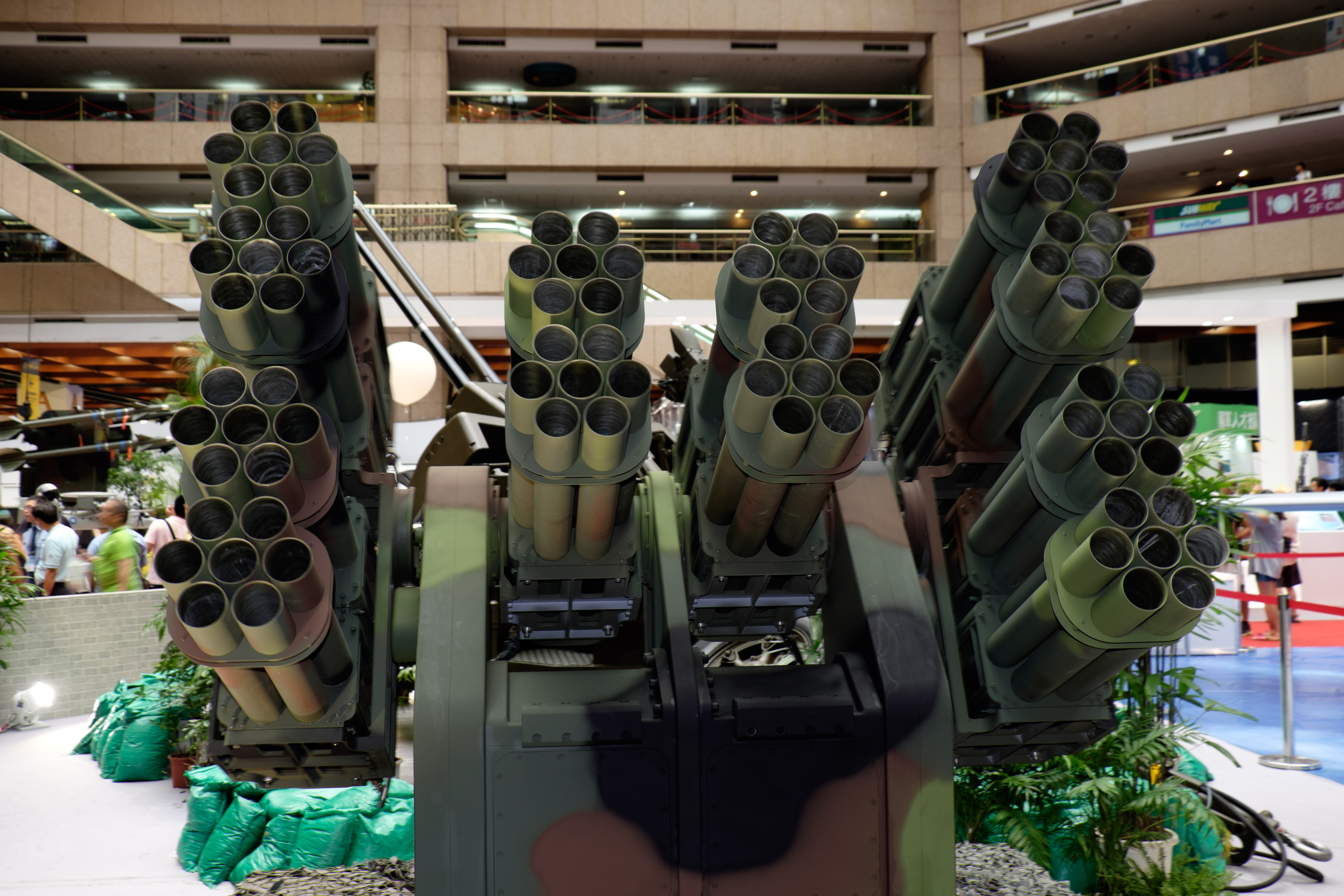
2015 display of its predecessor, the coastal defense rocket artillery system, at TADTE 2015

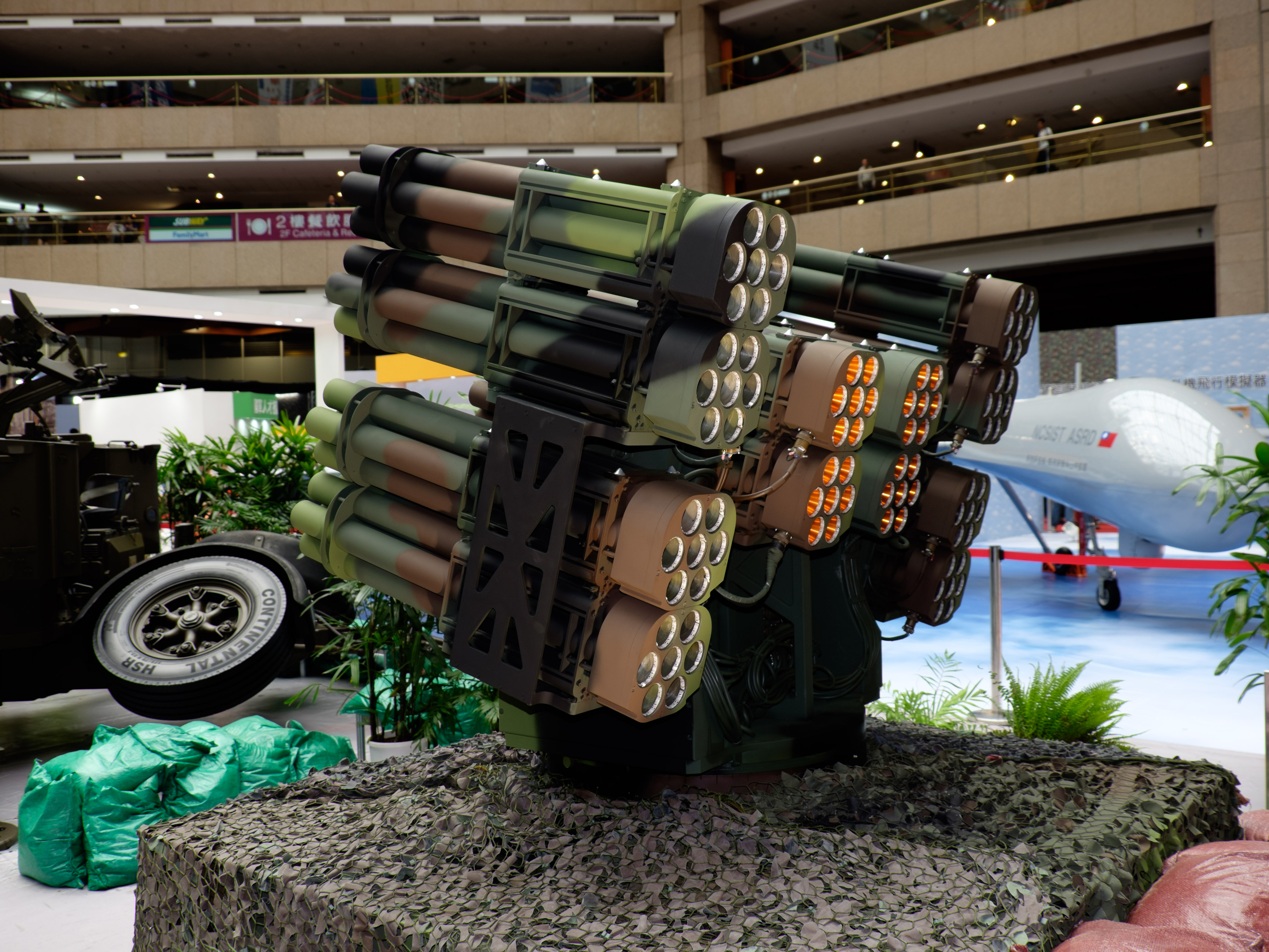
Back of the coastal defense rocket artillery system

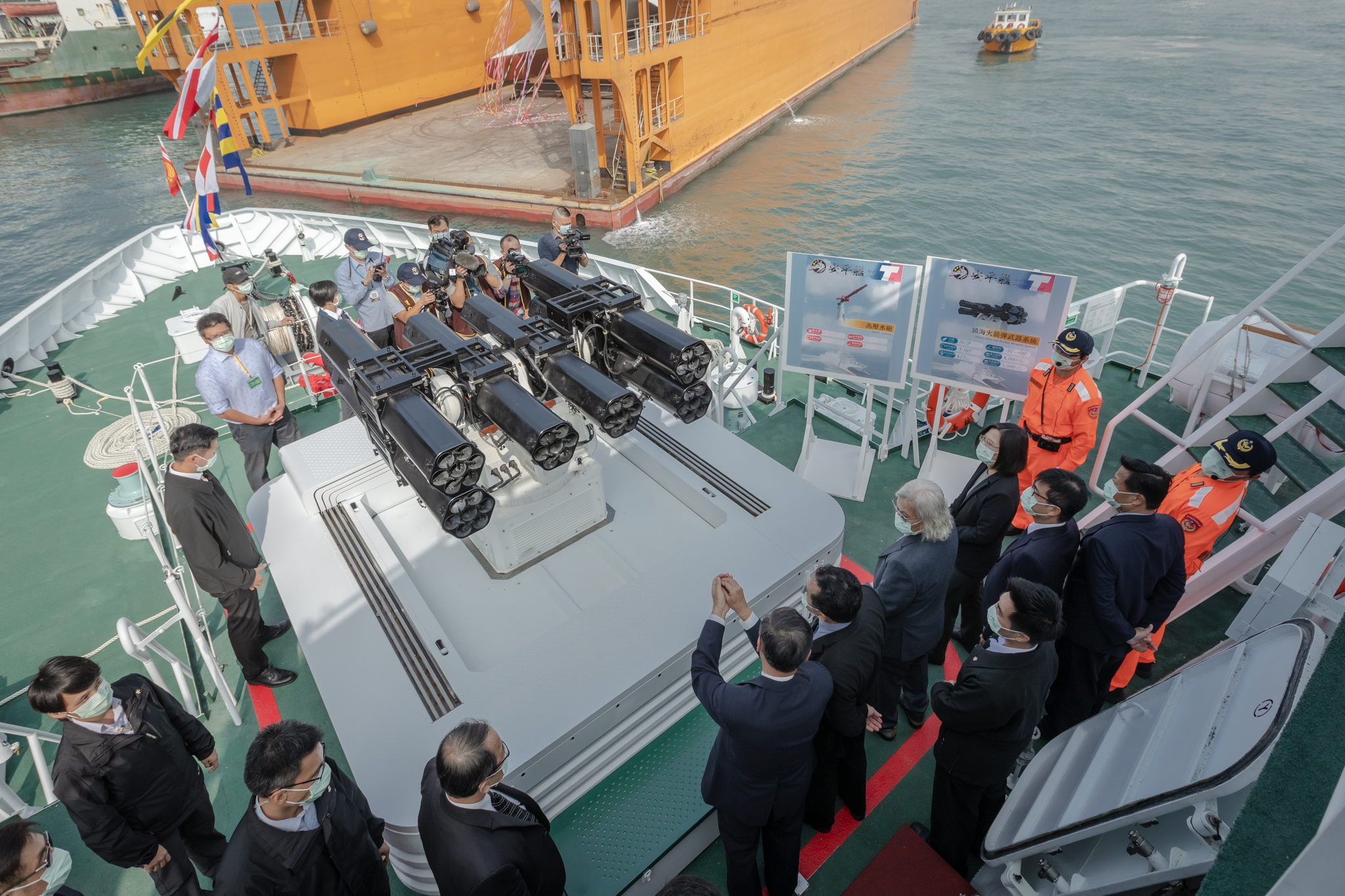
NCSIST 2.75in rockets remote weapon station on Anping-class offshore patrol vessel CG-601

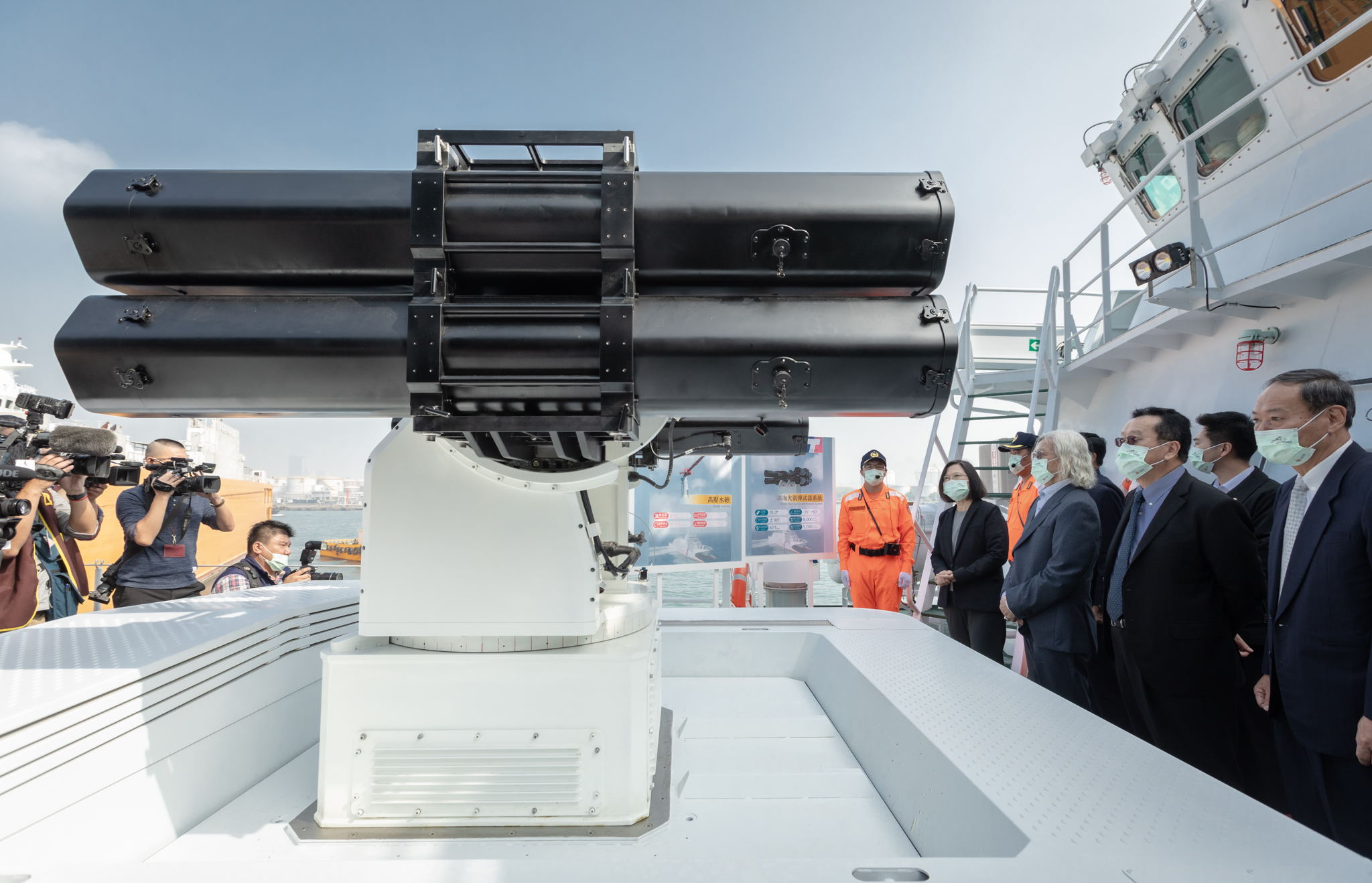
Side look of the system

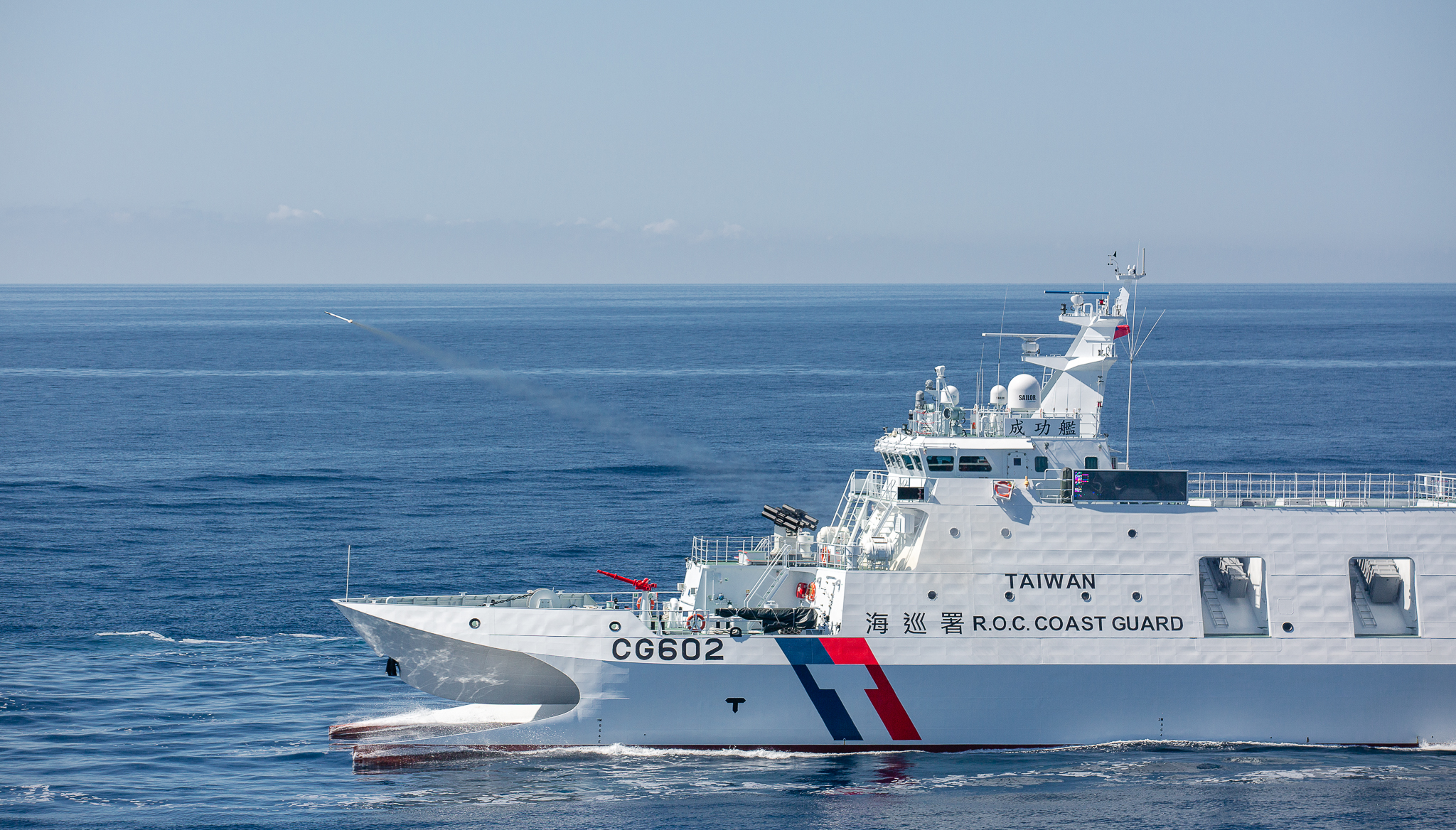
NCSIST 2.75in rockets remote weapon station launching Mk66 from CG-602

== See also ==
- Defense industry of Taiwan
- Kung Feng multiple launch rocket system
- XTR-101/102
