= XTR-101/102 =

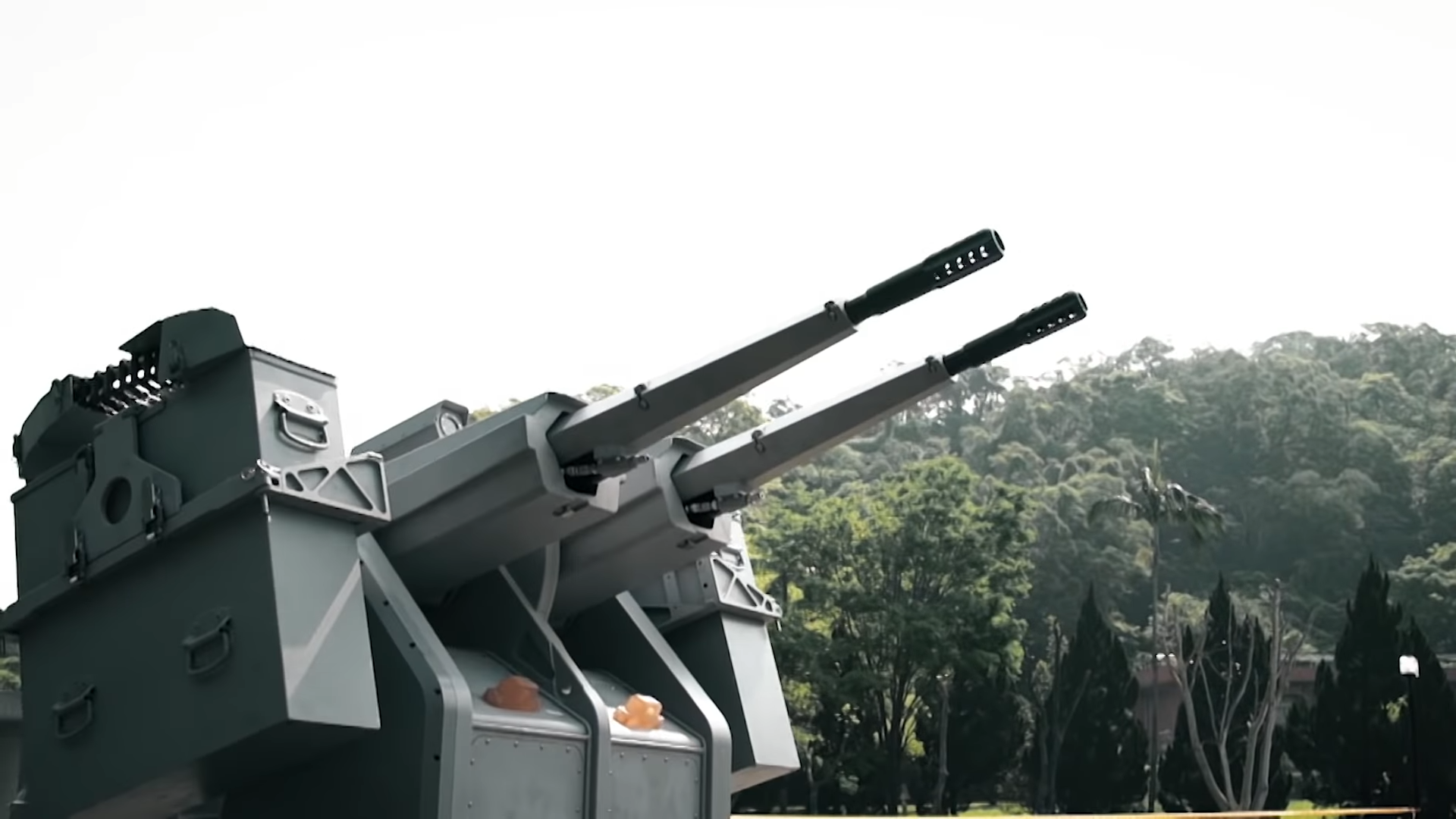
- XTR-102
- Type: Remote weapon system/Sentry gun
- Place of origin: Taiwan

Service history
- In service: 2017–current
- Used by: Republic of China Navy

Production history
- Designer: National Chung-Shan Institute of Science and Technology
- Manufacturer: National Chung-Shan Institute of Science and Technology
- Variants: XTR-101, XTR-102

Specifications
- Caliber: 20mm
- Elevation: -15 to 85
- Traverse: 360

XTR-101 and XTR-102 are a pair of automatic close-defense 20mm remote weapon systems produced by the National Chung-Shan Institute of Science and Technology of Taiwan. The XTR-101 features a single T-75 cannon while the XTR-102 features two of them mounted side by side. Along with associated sensors, power, and command and control equipment, the system forms a Short-Range Automated Defense Weapon System (SADWS).

== Description ==
The turrets can rotate 360° at a maximum speed of 60° per second at an elevation from −15° to 85°. Both systems feature onboard optical imagery identification, target tracking, and fire control. It can be mounted on armored vehicles, naval vessels, and fixed ground positions.

== Development ==
With the looming end of conscription and the growing power of the People's Liberation Army the Republic of China Armed Forces started looking for ways to automate hazardous and remote coastal defenses. The T-75 revolver cannon is based on the American M39 cannon and was developed in Taiwan. The weapon systems were first exhibited at the Taipei Aerospace & Defense Technology Exhibition in 2013. Testing began in 2014 with live fire trials held at a naval base in Kinmen County.

== Service history ==
The Republic of China Navy has deployed twenty XTR-102 systems in Wuqiu Township, Kinmen County. The Republic of China Army plans to deploy the systems in Dongyin, Kinmen (Quemoy), Matsu, Wuhu and Danshuihe.

In 2019, the Navy ordered three additional XTR-102 systems. The contract value was NT$286 million (US$9.26 million) with delivery by December 2022.

== See also ==
- Sentry gun
- Remote controlled weapon station
- NCSIST 2.75in rockets remote weapon station
