= Landfall 39 =

Landfall 39 may refer to:

- C&C Landfall 39, a Canadian sailboat design
- Landfall 39 (Amy), a Taiwanese sailboat design
