= Nordhavn =

Nordhavn may refer to:

- Nordhavn, Copenhagen, a harbour area in Copenhagen, Denmark
- Nordhavn railway station, a commuter rail and rapid transit station in Copenhagen
- Nordhavn (yacht), an American brand of motor yachts
