= Ta Shing =

Ta Shing Yacht Building
- Industry: Yacht Building
- Founded: 1957
- Headquarters: Tainan, Taiwan
- Key people: CM Juan (Founder); Tim Juan (President)
- Products: Trawlers Yachts
- Website: www.tashingyachts.com.tw

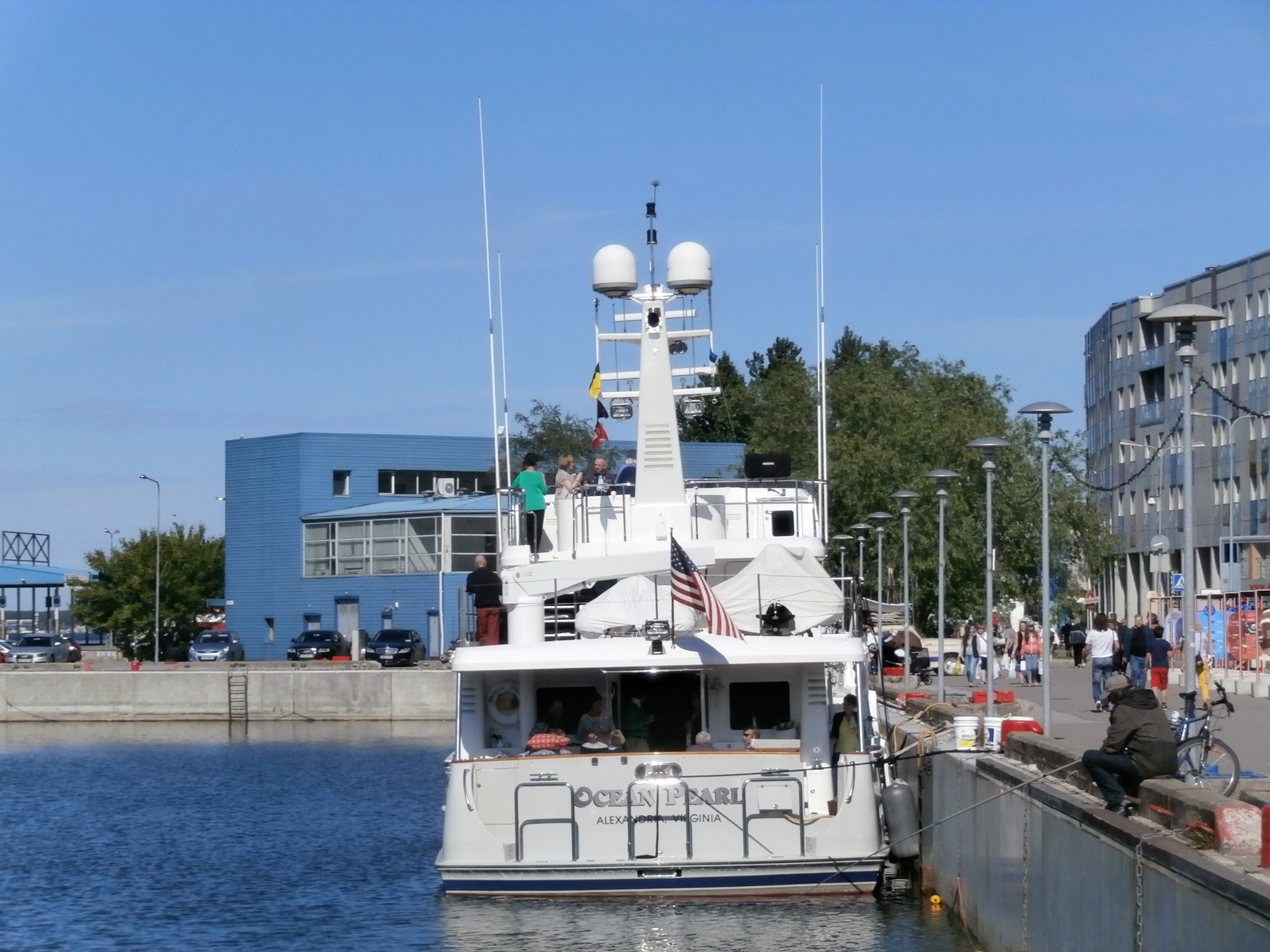
Ocean Pearl stern, Tallinn 27 June 2014

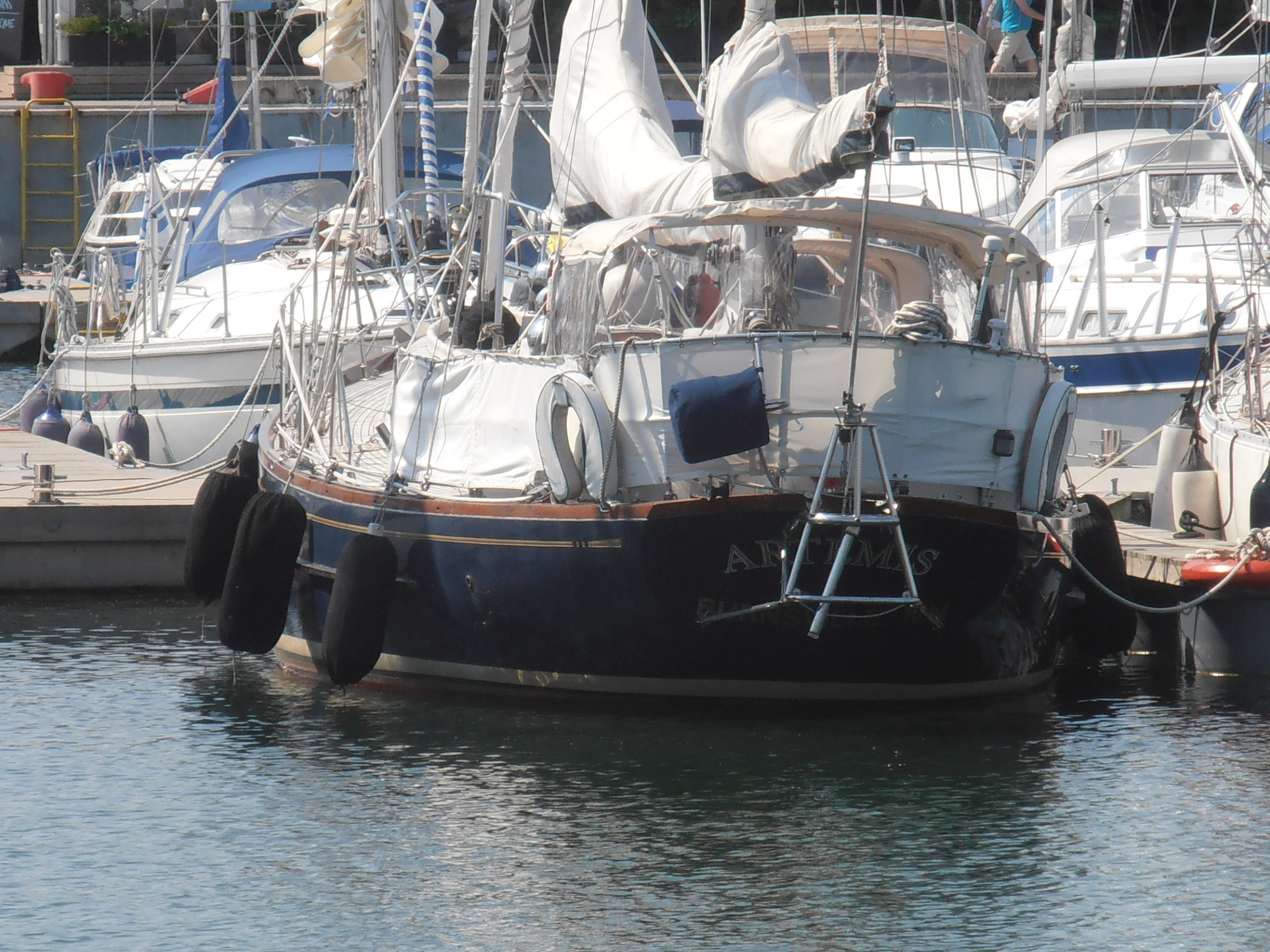
Artemis

Ta Shing Yacht Building (Chinese: 大新遊艇股份有限公司; pinyin: Dàxīn Yóutǐng Gǔfèn Yǒuxiàn Gōngsī) is a yacht builder located in Tainan, Taiwan. The company was founded in 1957 under the Shing Sheng brand name. Between its founding and 2015, the yard has delivered over 1,200 custom-made boats.

Ta Shing designs and builds under its own brand including Taswell, Tashiba, Orion and also as an OEM for Mason, Baba, Panda, Skye, Mystic and Nordhavn. The range includes wooden and fiberglass fishing boats, sailboats, and motoryachts.

== History ==
The founder, CM Juan established Shing Sheng boatyard in 1957. The company began by building fishing vessels, which were distributed all around Taiwan. Later, Shing Sheng became a pioneer, building the first FRP fishing boat in Taiwan. The Ta Shing-built FRP fishing boats were even dedicated to the Panama Government as a special gift from the government of Taiwan. Ta Shing itself was established in 1978.

In March 2006, Tim Juan, son of CM Juan, took his position as president of Ta Shing.

== Milestones ==
- 1957 Shing Sheng, former TaShing, wooden fishing boat yard established by CM Juan in Tainan City, Taiwan
- 1960s Shing Sheng innovated FRP fishing boats by brand name of Shing Sheng, being one of the few pioneer of FRP fishing boat in Taiwan
- 1970s Self own-brand Shing Sheng fishing boats, and OEM for Baba sailboats
- 1978 Ta Shing Yacht Building Co., Ltd. was established in nearby Anping Harbor in Tainan, Taiwan
- 1980s Ta Shing builds self own-brand Tashiba sailboats and OEM for Mason sailboats
- 1990s Ta Shing builds self own-brand Taswell sailboats and OEM for Nordhavn trawlers
- 2003 Expanded a branch factory (Shing-Her factory) one block away from TaShing yard
- 2010 Three TaShing-built Boats Returned Back to Mother City Tainan
- 2016 Ta Shing Yachts resurrects Popular Taswell Brand in Run-Up to TIBS 2016
- 2017 Ta Shing Yachts is shortlisted for Best Apprenticeship Scheme of IBI-METSTRADE Boat Builder Awards 2017
- 2019 Ta Shing Yachts is shortlisted for BEST APPRENTICESHIP OR TRAINING SCHEME of IBI-METSTRADE Boat Builder Awards 2019

== Boats ==
- Orion 50
- Mason 43

== See also ==
- Maritime industries of Taiwan
- Ocean Alexander
- Horizon Yachts
- Johnson Yachts
- Tayana Yachts
- Hylas Yachts
