= Allure of the Seas =

Oasis-class cruise ship

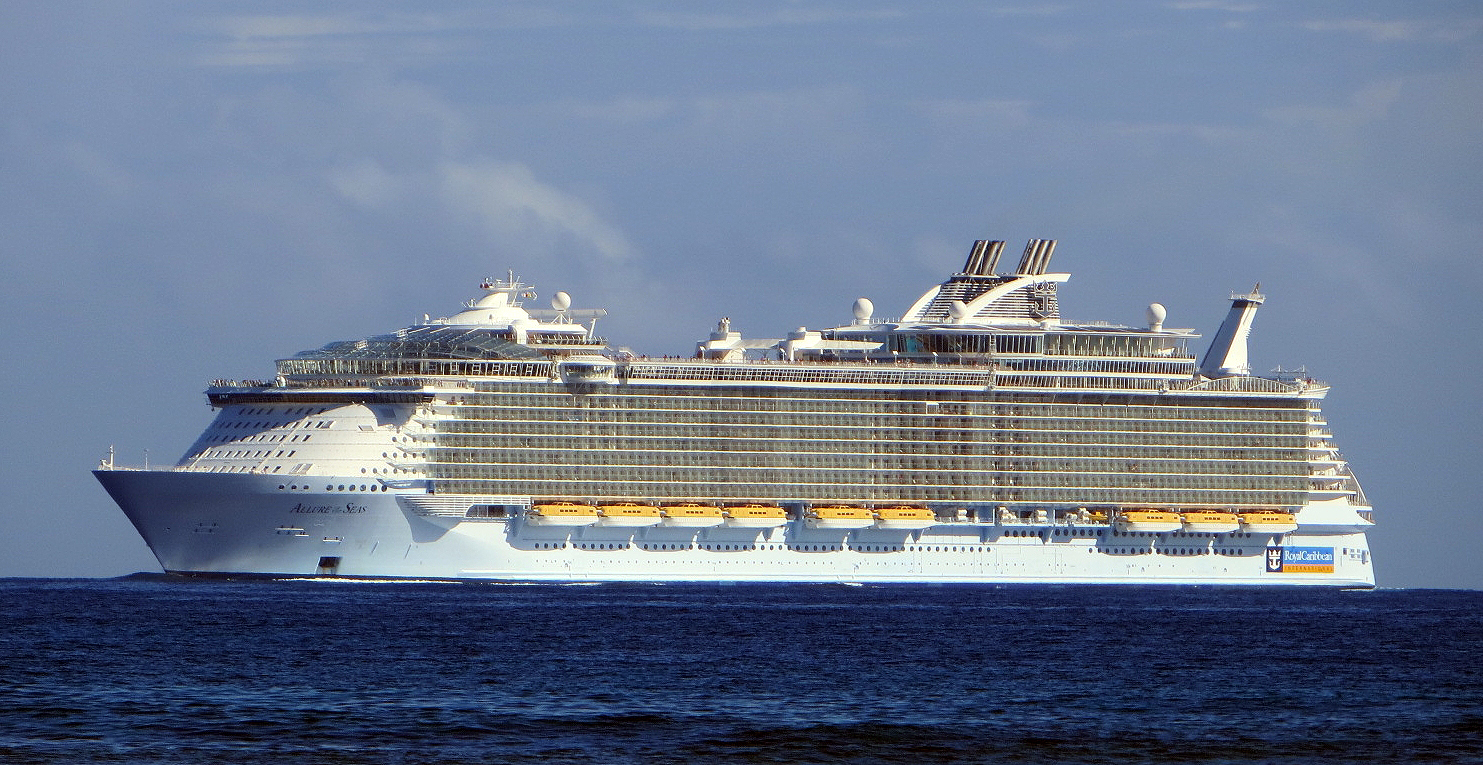
- Allure of the Seas in 2014

History

Bahamas
- Name: Allure of the Seas
- Owner: Royal Caribbean Group
- Operator: Royal Caribbean International
- Port of registry: Nassau, Bahamas
- Ordered: 31 March 2007
- Builder: STX Europe Turku Shipyard, Finland
- Cost: US$1.2 billion (2006)
- Yard number: 1364
- Laid down: 2 December 2008
- Launched: 20 November 2009
- Christened: 28 November 2010
- Completed: 28 October 2010
- Maiden voyage: 1 December 2010
- In service: 2010–present
- Refit: 23 February 2025 – 10 April 2025
- Identification: Call sign: C6XS8; IMO number: 9383948; MMSI number: 311020700; DNV ID: 28329
- Status: In Service

General characteristics
- Class & type: Oasis-class cruise ship
- Tonnage: 226,637 GT; 257,208 NT; 19,750 DWT
- Displacement: Approximately 100,000 tons
- Length: 362 m (1,187 ft)
- Beam: 47 m (154 ft) waterline; 64.9 m (213 ft) max beam
- Height: 72 m (236 ft) above water line
- Draught: 9.322 m (30.6 ft)
- Depth: 22.5 m (74 ft)
- Decks: 16 passenger decks; 18 total decks
- Installed power: 3 × 13,860 kW (18,590 hp) Wärtsilä 12V46D; 3 × 18,480 kW (24,780 hp) Wärtsilä 16V46D
- Propulsion: 3 × 20 MW (27,000 hp) ABB Azipod, all azimuthing; 4 × 5.5 MW (7,400 hp) Wärtsilä CT3500 bow thrusters
- Speed: 22.6 knots (41.9 km/h; 26.0 mph)
- Capacity: 5,484 passengers at double occupancy; 6,780 maximum
- Crew: 2,200 as of 2019
- Notes: 50 mm (2.0 in) longer than Oasis

Allure of the Seas is an Oasis-class cruise ship owned and operated by Royal Caribbean International. The Oasis class ships were the largest passenger vessels in service until 2024, when the Icon-class ship, Icon of the Seas, surpassed them to become the world's largest cruise ship. Allure is 50 millimetres (2.0 in) longer than her sister ship Oasis of the Seas, though both were built to the same specifications. Designed under the name "Project Genesis", she was ordered from Aker Finnyards in February 2006 and her construction began at the Perno shipyard in Turku, Finland, in February 2008. She was named in May 2008 after a contest was held to name her and her sister. The keel of Allure of the Seas was laid on 2 December 2008, shortly after the shipyard had been acquired by STX Europe.

Upon launch in November 2009, she became the world's largest passenger ship, taking the place of Oasis of the Seas. Her sister ship, Harmony of the Seas, succeeded this record in June 2015. Harmony of the Seas has an overall length of 362.12 metres (1,188.1 ft).

== History ==
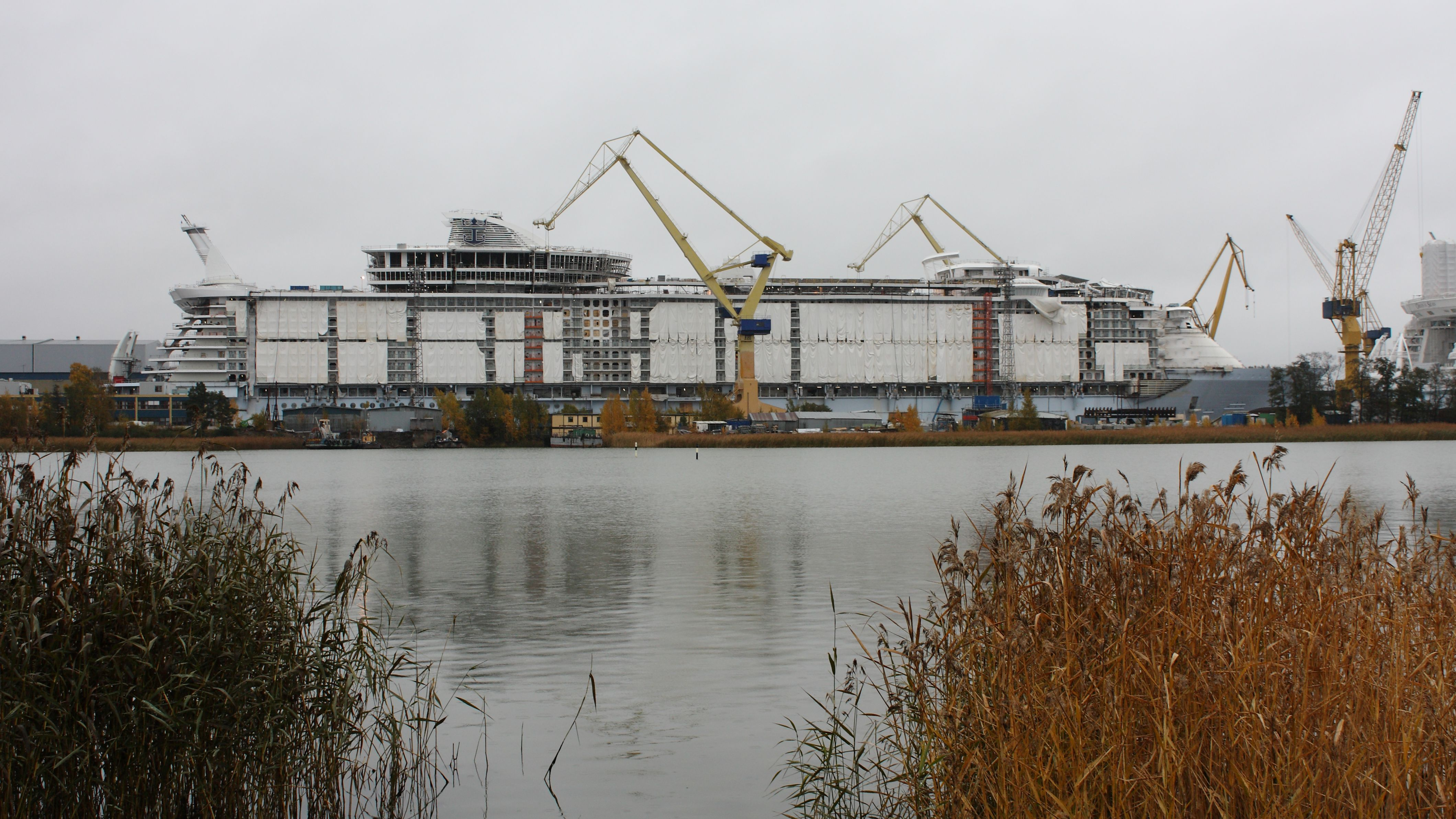
Allure of the Seas under construction at STX Europe shipyard in Turku, Finland on 18 October 2009

The keel of Allure of the Seas was laid on 2 December 2008 at the STX Europe Turku shipyard, Finland, during a ceremony involving Royal Caribbean and STX representatives. She was launched on 20 November 2009, with further outfitting taking place while afloat in the shipyard. Allure of the Seas was declared complete and formally delivered to Royal Caribbean on 28 October 2010. She left the Turku shipyard on 29 October 2010 at 05:45 UTC, heading directly to her home port of Port Everglades, near Fort Lauderdale, Florida, USA. The ship is equipped with telescoping funnels to pass under bridges such as the Storebælt Bridge, which she passed on 30 October 2010. While media has reported that there was only 30 centimetres (12 in) of clearance, the truth is that at the mean water level it was closer to 2–3 metres (6.6–9.8 ft) and the much-advertised squat effect, whereby vessels traveling at speed in a shallow channel will be drawn deeper into the water, did not have significant effect on the draft of the vessel.

On 11 November 2010 at approximately 14:30 UTC, Allure of the Seas arrived at her home port of Port Everglades, Florida. She was greeted by thousands of spectators waiting on the shore.

The ship was formally named by her godmother, the fictional character Princess Fiona, in a ceremony on 28 November 2010.

In February 2014, Allure of the Seas entered dry dock at Grand Bahama island for seven days to replace a damaged gearbox in one of her Azipods. As the dry dock facility was not large enough to fully accommodate an Oasis-class ship, a unique solution had to be devised to allow the replacement, known as "Project Atlantis". During her time in dry dock, the crew used the downtime to make numerous repairs and refurbishments to the guest facilities, including the installation of new carpets.

Allure of the Seas sailed year-round in the Caribbean region out of Port Everglades from its homeporting in 2010 through 2014. She changed port to Barcelona and sailed the Mediterranean between May and October 2015, becoming the largest cruise ship and the first Oasis-class ship to spend a full season in that region. Afterward, she returned to Port Everglades.

Allure of the Seas changed its home port in November 2018 to the Port of Miami, where Royal Caribbean constructed a new cruise terminal. She was joined by the fourth Oasis-class vessel, Symphony of the Seas, and both sail year-round from the port offering seven-night Western and Eastern Caribbean cruises.

In March 2019, Allure of the Seas was named second for "Best Cruises Overall" in the 2019 Cruise Critic Cruisers' Choice Awards.

In early May 2019, the itinerary for some of the ship's sailings had to be adjusted due to a technical issue with one of the ship's propulsion pods, which forced it to have to sail at a reduced speed.

Allure of the Seas was expected to be refitted in early 2020, which would have included the addition of approximately 50 more passenger cabins, a waterpark, laser tag, an update to the adults-only Solarium, and more. However, due to the COVID-19 pandemic, this was delayed by Royal Caribbean. Renovations for Allure of the Seas began in February 2025 at the Navantia shipyard in Cádiz, Spain, and were completed in April 2025 at a cost of over $100 million. The project included the installation of the Ultimate Abyss dry slide, the Perfect Storm waterslides, a redesigned pool deck, and updates to the adults-only Solarium. Additional changes included the addition of Splashaway Bay, new dining venues such as El Loco Fresh, The Lime & Coconut bar, and the Pesky Parrot tiki bar, as well as Playmakers Sports Bar & Arcade and The Mason Jar Southern Restaurant & Bar. The ship also introduced a new Royal Escape Room, a Laser Tag experience, redesigned Adventure Ocean youth spaces, and an updated teen area known as Social298.

Starting in November 2022, Allure of the Seas was based in Galveston, Texas, at the Port of Galveston's new cruise terminal. As of May 2025, Allure of the Seas is based in Barcelona, Spain, sailing 7-night Western Mediterranean cruises.

== Technical details ==
The classified length of Allure of the Seas is the same as that of her sister, 360 metres (1,181 ft), though she is reported to be 50 millimetres (2 in) longer than Oasis of the Seas. According to the shipyard, this is not intentional and such small differences in length may occur simply due to the temperature of the steel in a ship as big as this. The gross tonnage of Allure of the Seas is 225,282 and her displacement is equal to that of Oasis of the Seas, which is estimated to be around 100,000 metric tons, slightly less than that of an American Nimitz-class aircraft carrier. Her steel hull alone weighs roughly 54,000 tons.

The ship features a two-deck dance hall, a theatre with 1,380 seats, an ice skating rink, 7 distinct "neighborhoods", the Ultimate Abyss dry slide, the longest dry slide at sea featured on other Oasis Class ships, and 25 dining options, including a Starbucks coffee shop at sea. Many of the ship's interiors were extensively decorated by muralist Clarissa Parish.

Before beginning service from Port Everglades, Allure of the Seas was fitted with an 80 kW solar array by BAM Energy Group which powers the shopping district. The system cost US$600,000 and covers an area of 2,000 m^{2} (21,530 sq ft). It uses Uni-Solar BIPV laminates designed to withstand foot traffic and marine conditions.

== Incidents ==
Date	Incident	Description
December 11, 2024	Crash	While harbored in Nassau, a Nordhavn luxury yacht My Aurora, hit the ship. The boat was delayed leaving port.
October 23, 2024	Death	A 66-year-old woman fell overboard from the cruise ship into the ocean near Bahamas, no remains were found during a 15-hour rescue search after the accident.
November 28, 2023	Death	A 16-year-old boy fell from a balcony onto the deck.
March 15, 2023	Death	While docked at Roatan Island, a 52-year-old male passenger died from jumping off an elevated metal structure.
March 8, 2020	Injury	A passenger required medical evacuation after sustaining an injury while using the Flowrider.
February 14, 2019	Injury	While on a Royal Caribbean-sponsored excursion, a guest was injured in a bus accident and required medical evacuation.
July 5, 2018	Death	Two passengers collided while on Royal Caribbean's zip line at Roatan Island after a guest got stuck along the zip line. One person died in a local hospital and another was evacuated to the USA.
September 16, 2012	Death	A 21-year-old passenger committed suicide by jumping overboard. During the fall, the body struck another passenger, without injury, while on their balcony.
April 20, 2012	Fire	While cruising from St. Martin to Port Everglades, a fire broke out in the engine room. No injuries were reported.

== Gallery ==
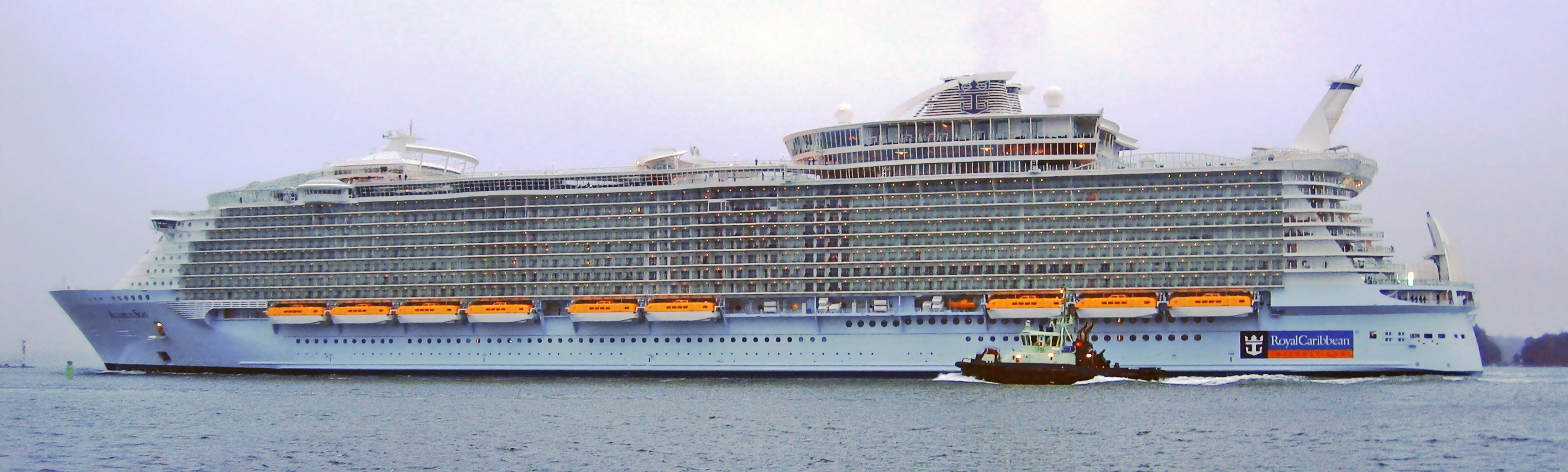
Allure of the Seas leaving STX shipyard, Turku, Finland, with her two funnels retracted.

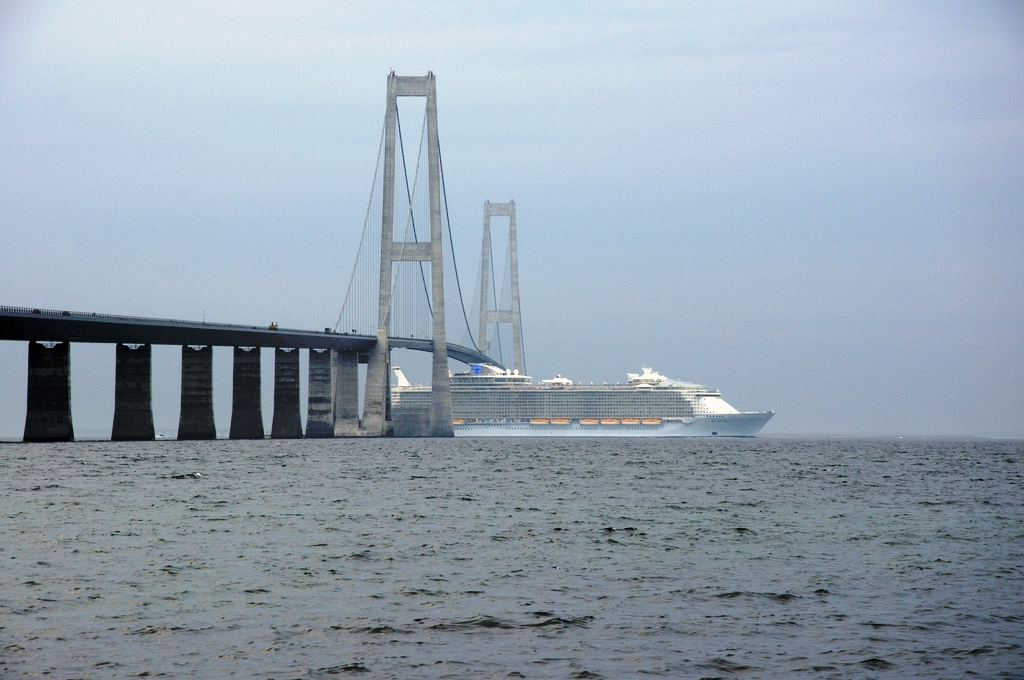
Allure of the Seas passing under the Great Belt Bridge with her funnels lowered.

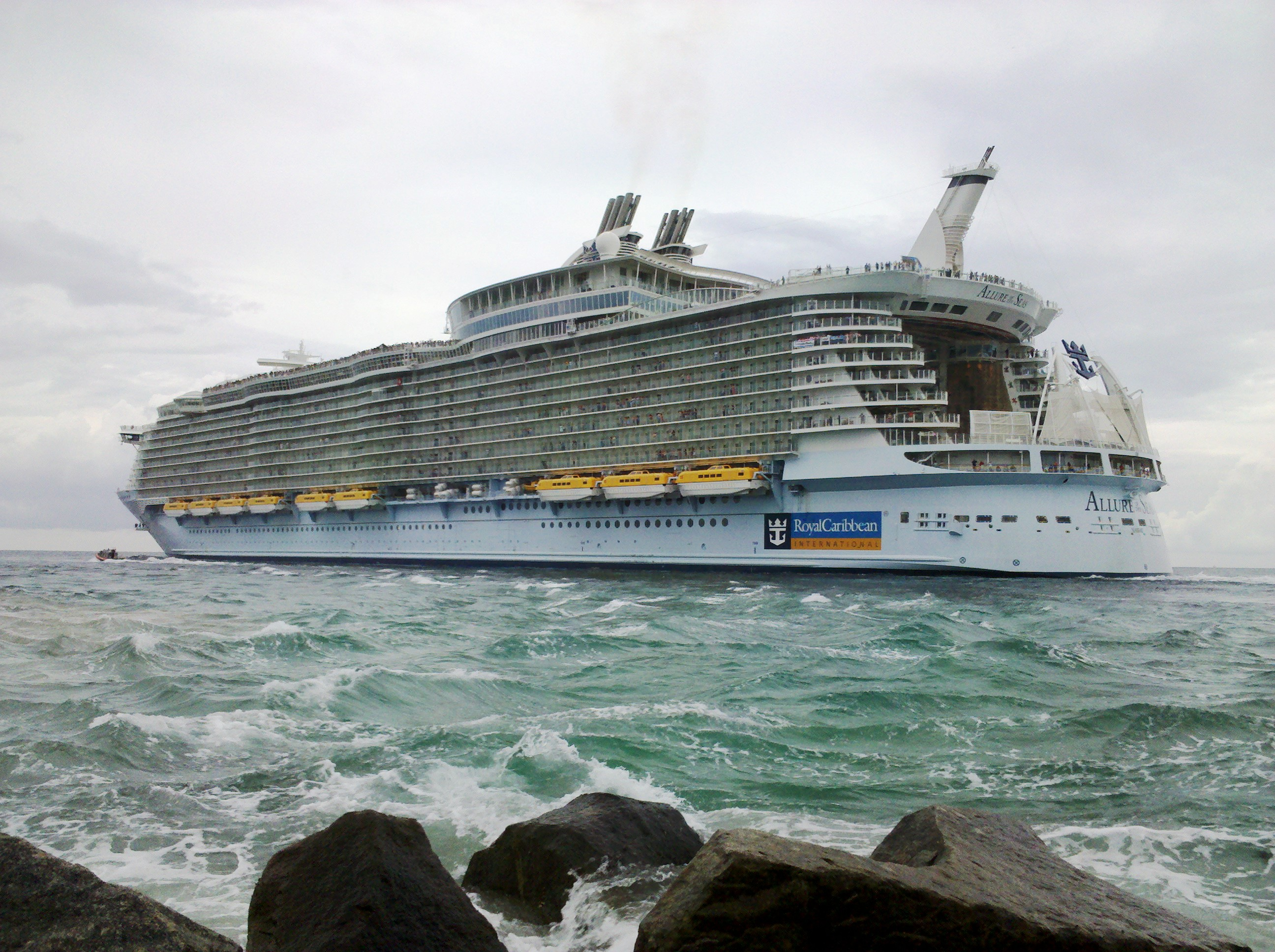
Allure of the Seas leaving Port Everglades

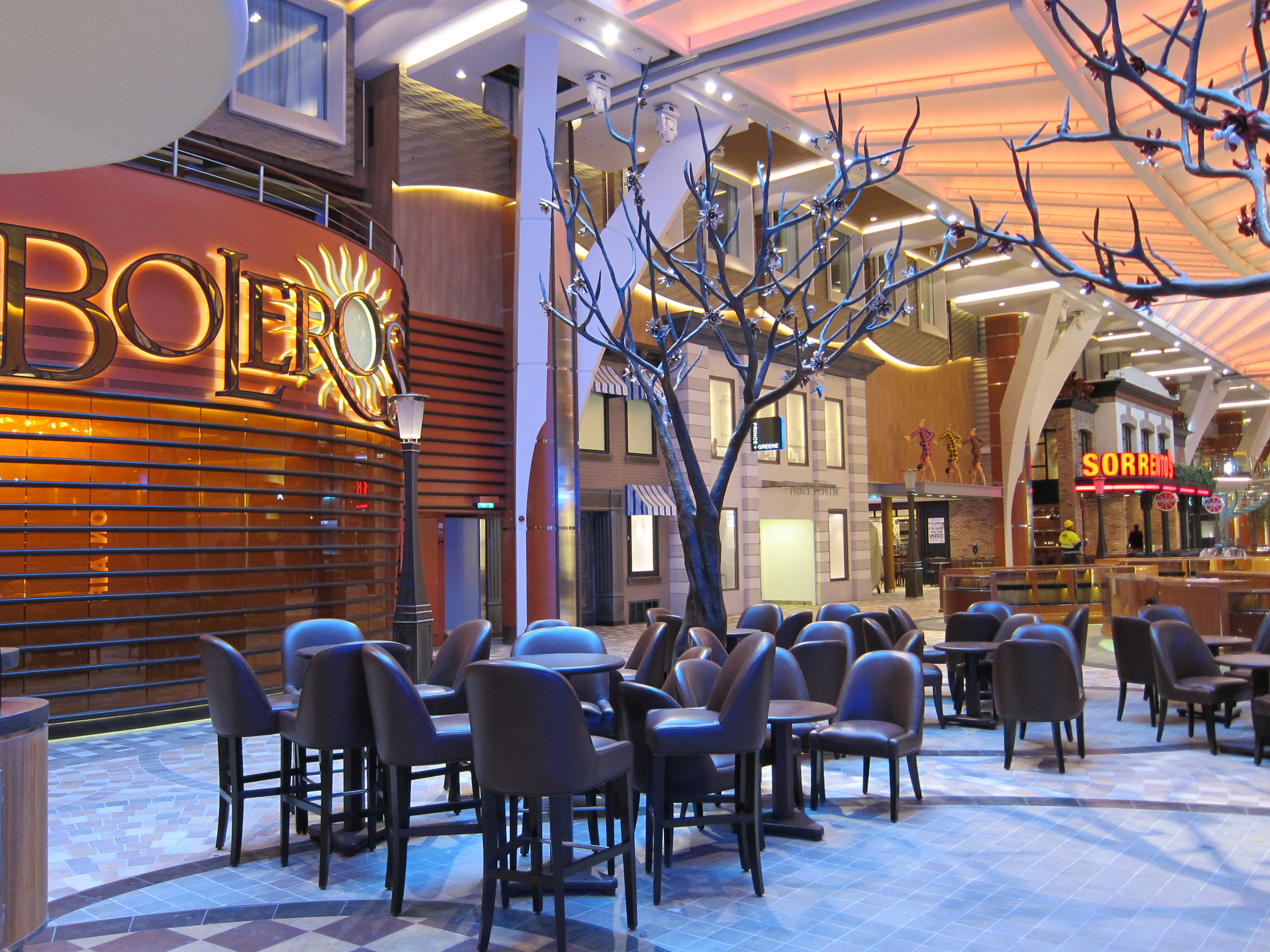
Royal Promenade

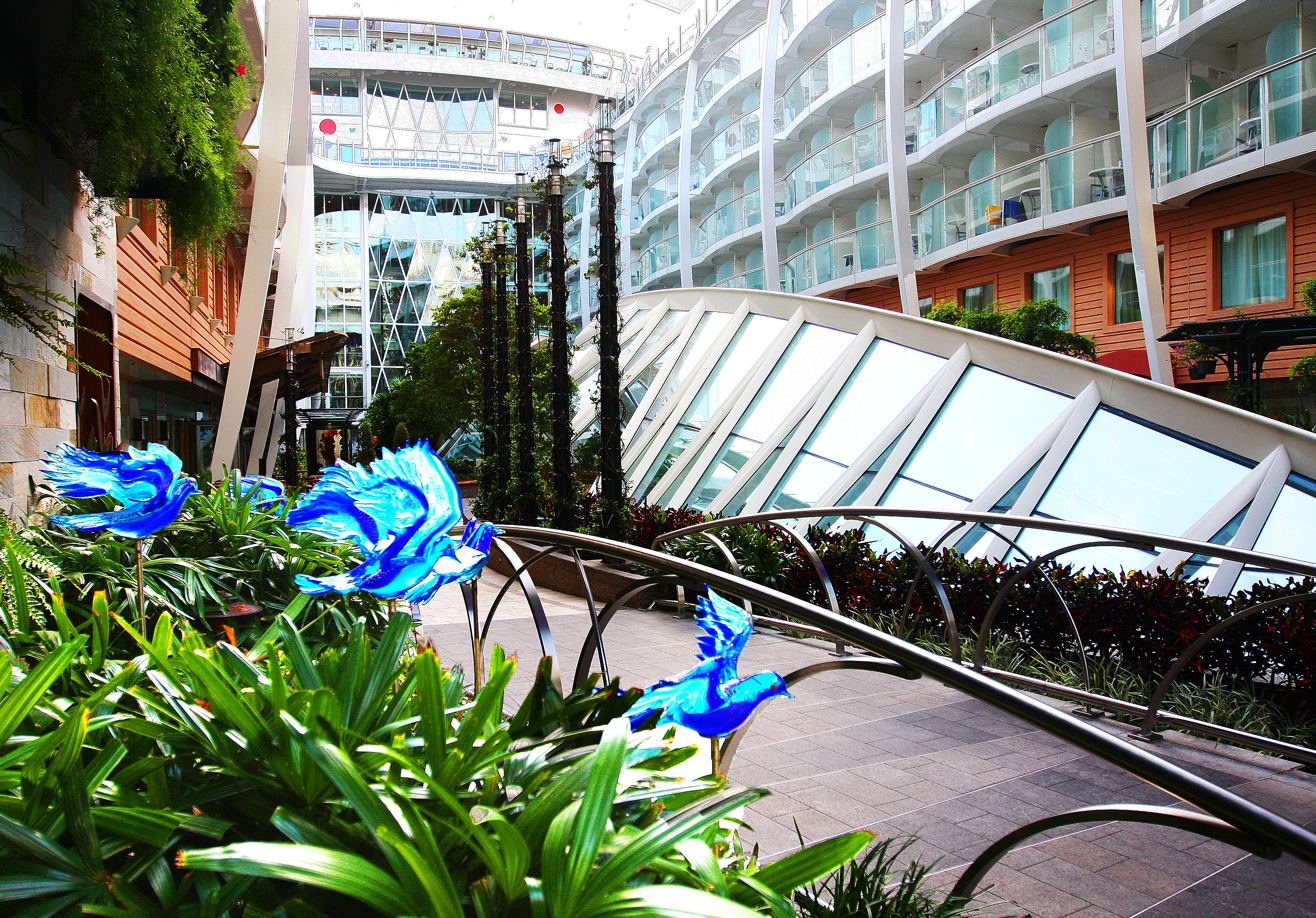
Central Park

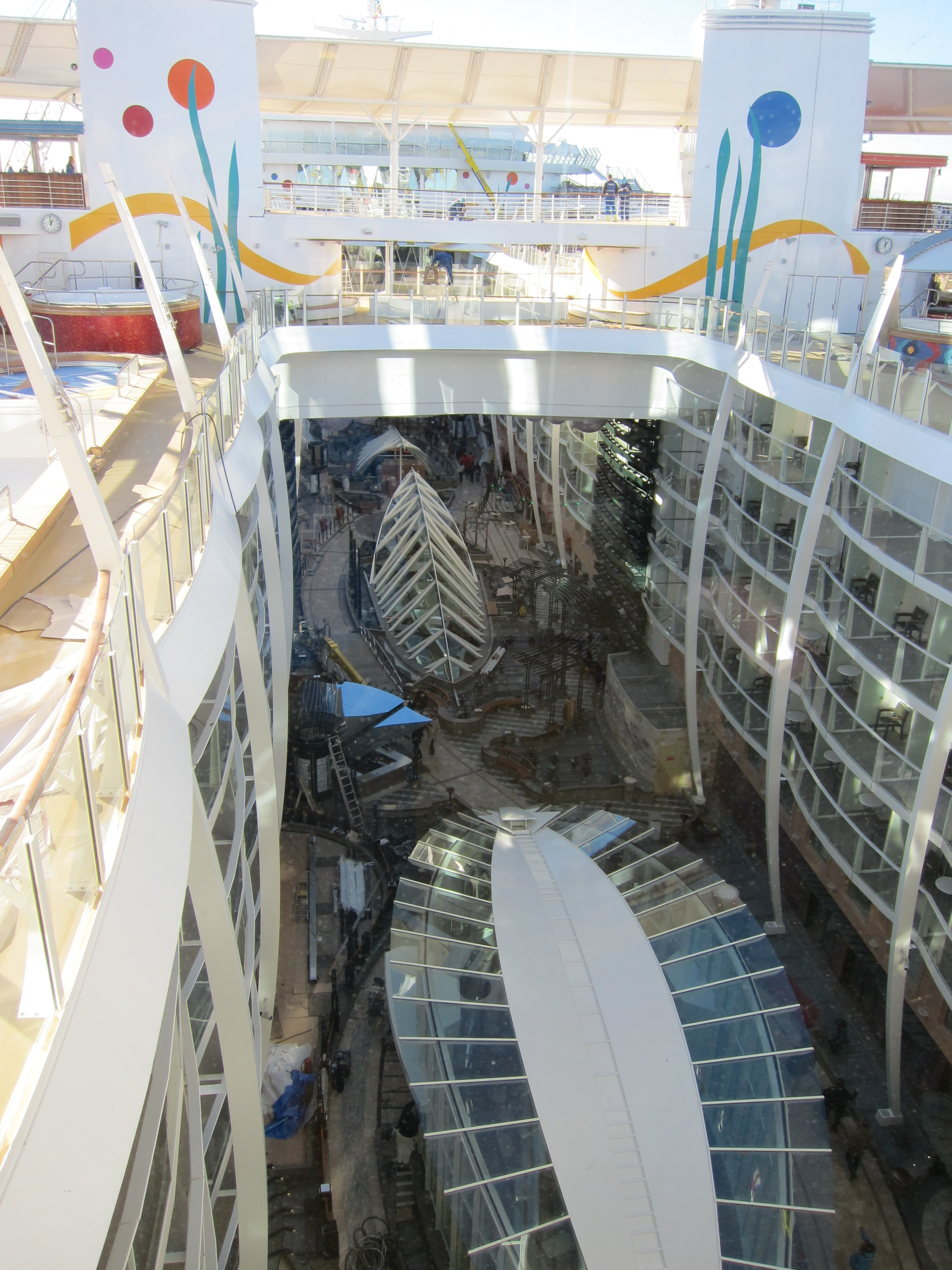
Central Park Top View

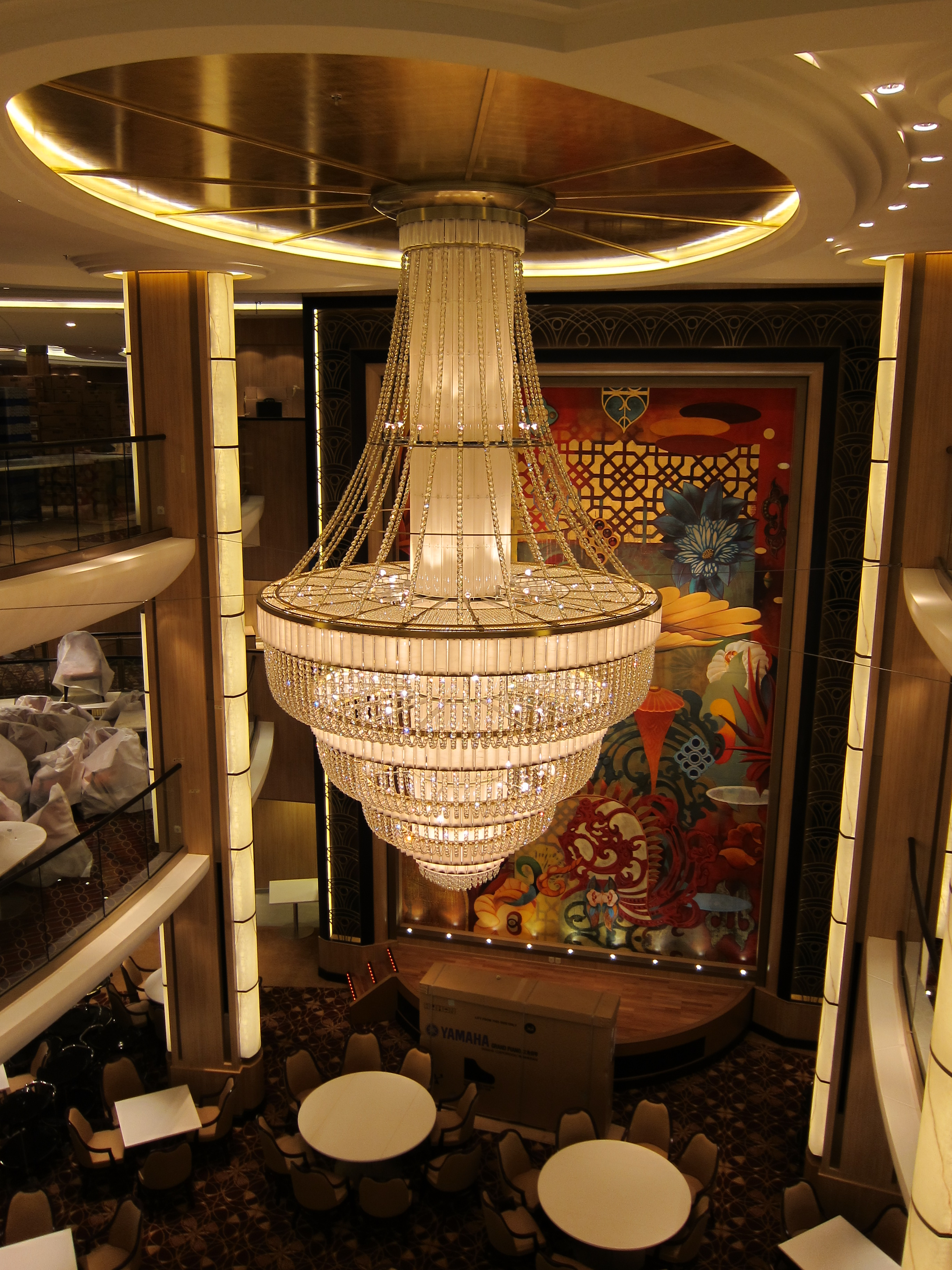
Central dining room

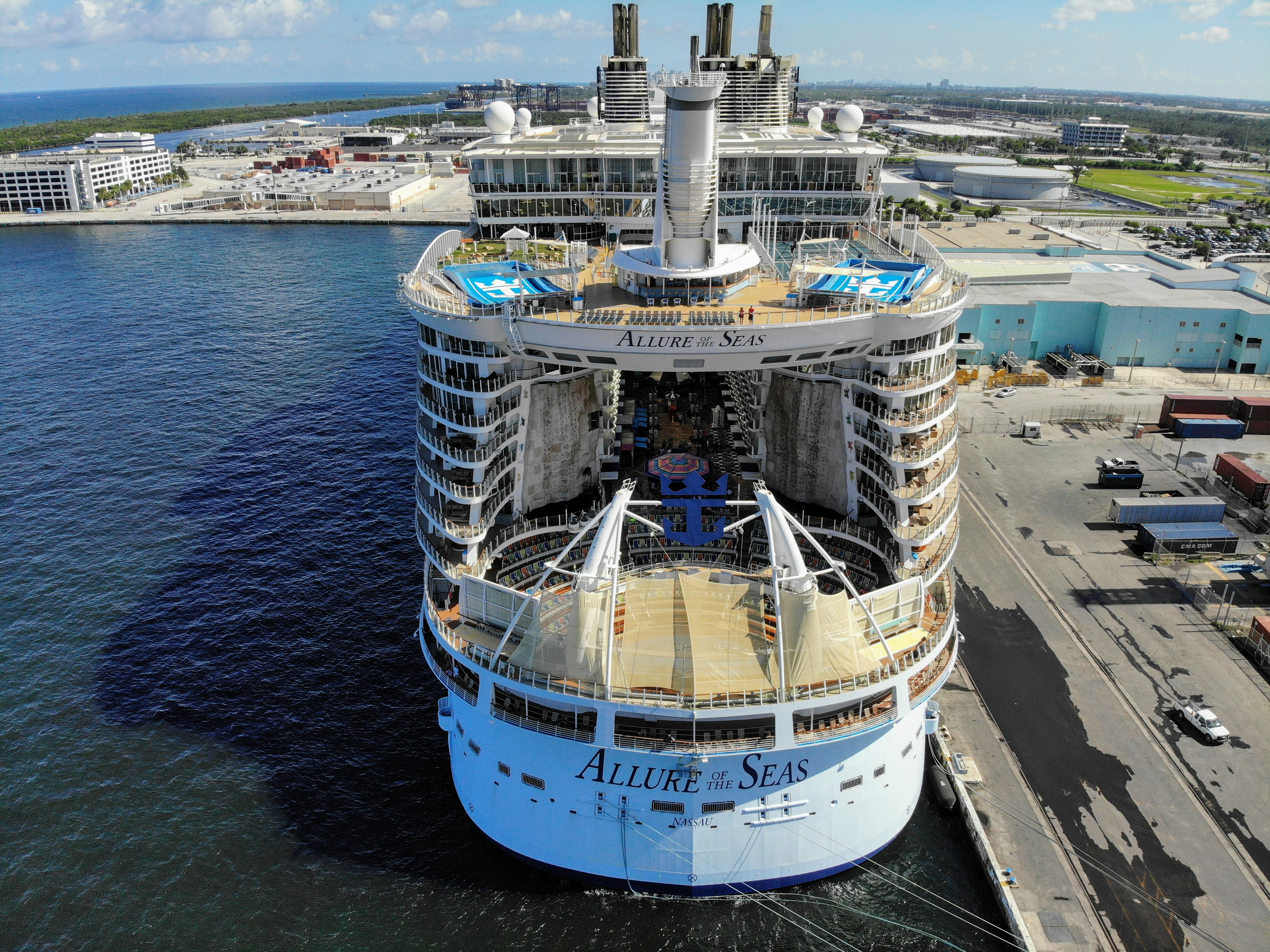
Aerial view of the stern of the Allure of the Seas docked at Port Everglades, Florida

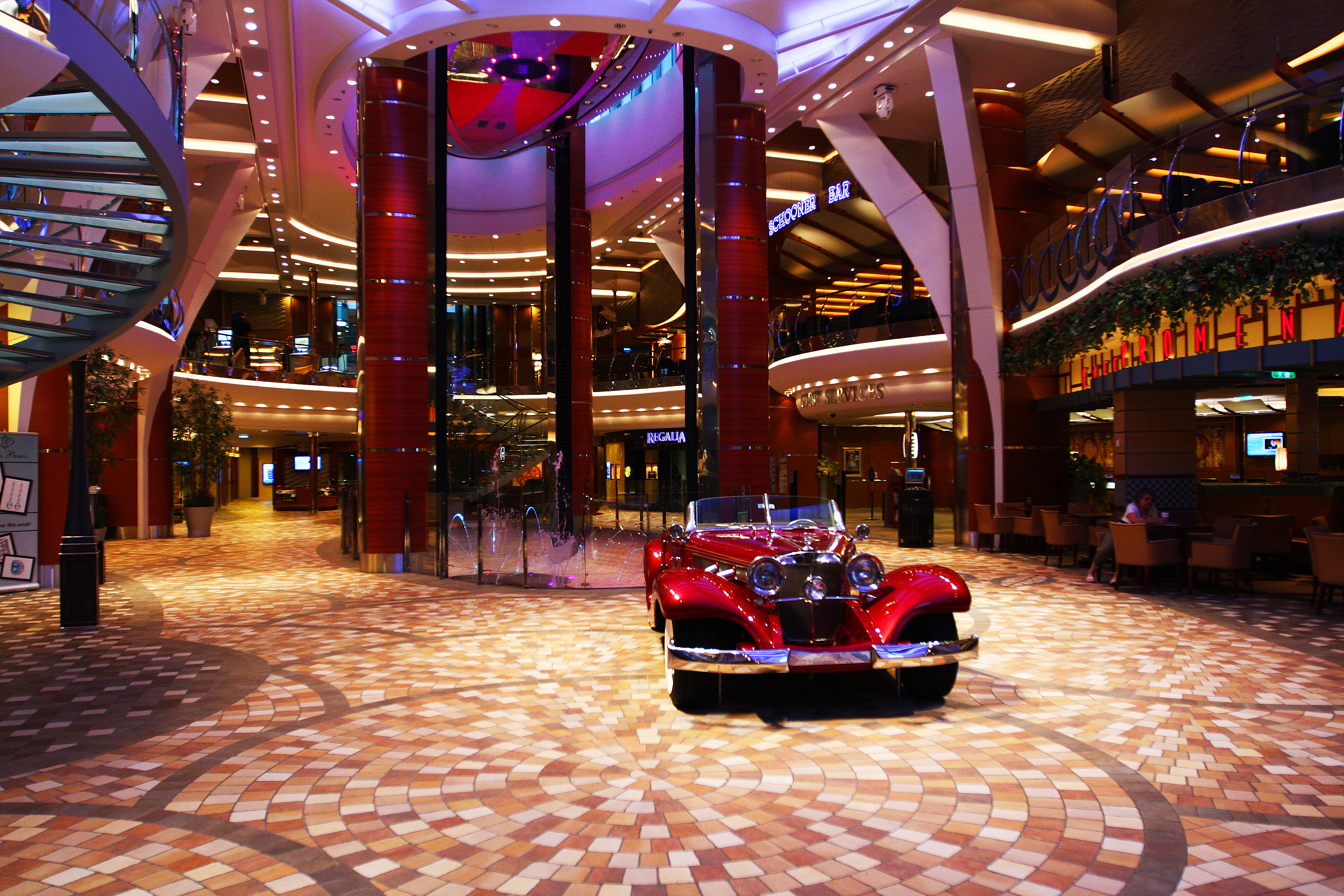
Promenade on the Allure of the Seas
