= Taswell =

Taswell may refer to:

- Taswell (yacht), a brand of sailboat
- Taswell, Indiana, an unincorporated community in Indiana, United States
- Ryan Davis (video game journalist), or "Taswell" (1979–2013), an American video game journalist, Internet personality, and co-founder of Giant Bomb
  - "Taswell", a musical tribute to Davis by C418 from Minecraft – Volume Beta, 2013
