= C&C Landfall 39 =

Sailboat class

Landfall 39
Development
- Designer: C&C Design and Robert Perry
- Location: Canada
- Year: 1985
- No. built: at least 15
- Builder: C&C Yachts
- Name: Landfall 39

Boat
- Displacement: 19,497 lb (8,844 kg)
- Draft: 5.51 ft (1.68 m)

Hull
- Type: Monohull
- Construction: Fibreglass
- LOA: 38.75 ft (11.81 m)
- LWL: 31.00 ft (9.45 m)
- Beam: 12.24 ft (3.73 m)
- Engine: Yanmar 4JHE 44 hp (33 kW) diesel engine

Hull appendages
- Keel: fin keel
- Ballast: 6,248 lb (2,834 kg)
- Rudder: skeg-mounted rudder

Rig
- Rig type: Bermuda rig

Sails
- Sailplan: Masthead sloop
- Total sail area: 667 sq ft (62.0 m^{2})

The C&C Landfall 39 is a sailboat that was designed by C&C Design and Robert Perry and first built in 1985. The boat has a centre cockpit deck layout, which allows for an aft cabin interior.

The design is sometimes confused with the Ron Amy-designed 1974 boat of the same name, although the two designs are unrelated.

== Production ==
The design was built by the Canadian company C&C Yachts, at their Rhode Island, United States plant. At least 15 examples of the design were completed between 1985 and 1989, but it is now out of production.

== Design ==
The C&C Landfall 39 is a recreational keelboat, built predominantly of fibreglass. It has a masthead sloop rig, a raked stem, a near-vertical transom, a skeg-mounted rudder controlled by a wheel and a fixed fin keel. It displaces 19,497 lb (8,844 kg) and carries 6,248 lb (2,834 kg) of lead ballast.

The boat has a draft of 5.51 ft (1.68 m) with the standard keel fitted. The boat is fitted with a Japanese Yanmar 4JHE diesel engine of 44 hp (33 kW). The fuel tank holds 40 U.S. gallons (150 L; 33 imp gal) and the fresh water tank has a capacity of 103 U.S. gallons (390 L; 86 imp gal).

=== Accommodations ===
Gregg Nestor, writing in Cruising World in 2011 said of the design: "With the exception of a cavernous lazarette, almost the entire hull of the Landfall 39 is devoted to accommodations. The quality of the joinery is above average, and areas of white laminate accent the varnished teak and go far toward keeping the interior bright. Headroom is well over 6 feet, and there are overhead grab rails for safety. The companionway ladder leads directly into the spacious main saloon, where settees outboard face a substantial centerline drop-leaf table. Aft on the starboard side of the main saloon there’s a large aft-facing navigation station and chart table. The area is well lit by the two large deadlights and a pair of opening portlights. Two dorade vents provide additional ventilation.

Forward of the saloon, a short passageway leads to the forward cabin and its generous V-berth. The head compartment is to starboard of the passageway, and a hanging locker lies to port.

The galley is in the port-side passageway that leads to the aft cabin. A double sink and a small counter are behind the companionway ladder, while the three-burner stove, more counter space, and the large, top-loading refrigerator/freezer are outboard.

The aft cabin offers very private quarters with an athwartships double berth, numerous stowage spaces, and its own head compartment. Four opening portlights and an overhead opening hatch provide illumination and ventilation."

== See also ==
- List of sailing boat types
