= BAM Energy Group =

Solar energy manufacturer

BAM Energy Group (formerly BAM Solar Power) is a photovoltaic system systems installer based in Miami, Florida. The company provides design, installation, monitoring and maintenance services for solar energy.

In January 2010, BAM installed the first solar electricity system on a cruise ship, Royal Caribbean's Oasis of the Seas. The installation covered a surface area of 21,000 sq. ft. (1950 m^{2}) on deck 19 and cost US$750,000. In January 2011, BAM installed an 80 kW system on RCL's Allure of the Seas, covering the largest area to date on a cruise ship - 2000 square meters. The system powers the shopping district, cost US$600,000, and used Uni-Solar durable BIPV laminates designed to withstand foot traffic and marine conditions.
