= Kadey-Krogen Yachts =

U.S. boat manufacturer

- Type: Private
- Industry: Marine
- Founded: 1977 by Art Kadey, Jim Krogen
- Headquarters: Stuart, Florida
- Area served: Worldwide
- Key people: Tucker West (President)
- Products: Recreational trawlers in the 39-to-64-foot (12 to 20 m) range
- Number of employees: 15 (2016)
- Website: www.kadeykrogen.com

Founded in 1977, Kadey-Krogen Yachts was a manufacturer of long-range capable, recreational trawler yachts in the U.S. They filed for chapter 7 bankruptcy in July 2026. Their vessels are closely linked in naval design to the historic fishing trawlers of the North Sea and have the capability to cross any ocean. Kadey-Krogen Yachts is a semi-custom builder and manufactures 10-15 yachts per year. Six models are currently offered, ranging in size from 44 to 58 feet (13 to 18 m) with new models on the drawing board.

Defining aspects of the Kadey-Krogen trawler yacht are a pure full displacement hull, a fine forward entry, a wineglass transom, a fully covered aft deck which functions as the back porch, and high quality interior joinery predominantly in teak or cherry with other selections available. Their design enables the yachts to make ocean passages in comfort and safety. Owners of Kadey-Krogen trawler yachts have reported crossing the Atlantic, Pacific and Indian oceans, and the Mediterranean Sea.

Kadey-Krogen is headquartered in Stuart, Florida, with other offices in Annapolis, Portsmouth, RI and Seattle. Unlike the majority of boat manufacturers, the company does not use a dealership network, but instead works directly with customers. Since 1991 the company's boats have been built at a dedicated yard in Kaohsiung, Taiwan. Kadey-Krogens are sold direct through an in-house sales team.

Kadey-Krogen's yachts are often used as liveaboard vessels. According to company estimates, up to 75-percent of owners are part- or full-time liveaboards. While most owners have or are in the process of retiring, many continue to work and utilize their last few years working to take small trip and get acquainted with their boat and the lifestyle.

== History ==
Based upon this design, the two incorporated as Kadey-Krogen Yachts and began to produce the Krogen 42’. Over the past 36 years Kadey-Krogen Yachts has designed and built 14 different models ranging from 36’ – 58’. Six different models are available as “current production” with several others on the drawing board.

The company was founded in 1977 by Art Kadey and Jim Krogen. Art Kadey died in 1981 and Jim Krogen in December 1994. From 1995 until 2006 the company was owned by some of Jim’s children and their business partners. In 2006, ownership of the company was transferred to John Gear, Larry Polster, and Tom Button.
