= North Pacific Yachts =

Shipbuilding company

- Company type: Private
- Industry: Marine
- Founded: 2004 by Trevor Brice and John Brice
- Headquarters: 12527 Crescent Rd., Surrey, British Columbia, Canada
- Area served: Worldwide
- Key people: Trevor Brice, John Brice
- Products: Recreational trawlers in the 44 to 59 foot range
- Website: http://www.northpacificyachts.com/

North Pacific Yachts is a privately held company based in Surrey, British Columbia, Canada, which builds 44 to 59 feet (13 to 18 m) recreational trawler yachts. The company manufactures ships near Shanghai, China.

== Company ==
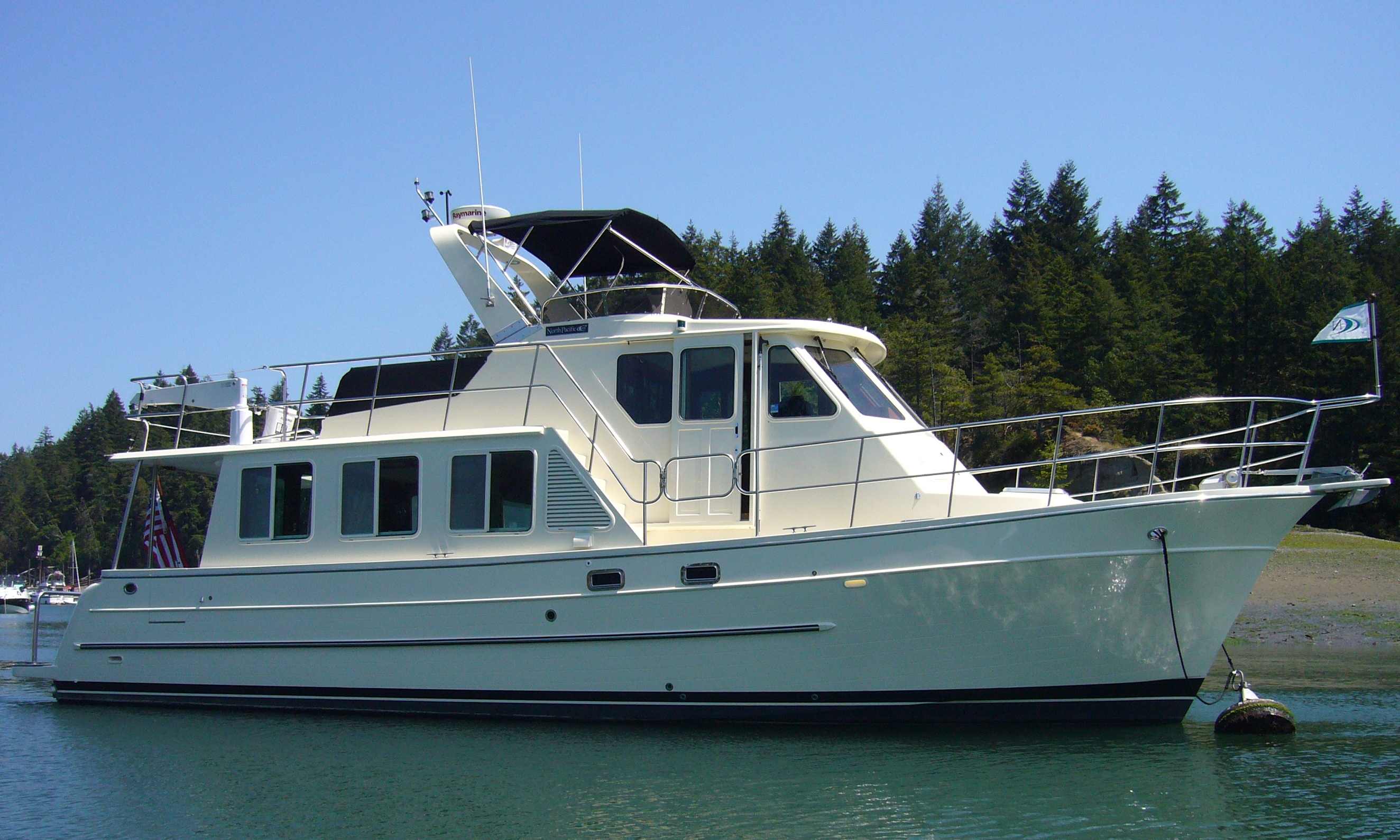
North Pacific 43 ft. Pilothouse

North Pacific Yachts Inc. was founded in 2004 and, as of December 2020, has built and delivered 138 boats to the United States, Canada, Europe, and Japan. The company primarily constructs long-range cruisers for extended cruising and on-board living. North Pacific Yachts currently offers five models from 44' to 59' as well as a broking service for pre-owned NPs and other vessels.

Current Models:

- North Pacific 44' Sedan
- North Pacific 45' Pilothouse
- North Pacific 49' Pilothouse (also offered with an extended cockpit)
- North Pacific 49' Euro Pilothouse (also offered with an extended cockpit)
- North Pacific 59' Pilothouse
