= Landfall 39 (Amy) =

Sailboat class

Development
- Designer: Ron Amy
- Location: Taiwan
- Year: 1974
- No. built: 200
- Builder: Sino American Yacht Industrial Company, Limited
- Name: Landfall 39

Boat
- Displacement: 23,500 lb (10,659 kg)
- Draft: 5.58 ft (1.70 m)

Hull
- Type: Monohull
- Construction: Fiberglass
- LOA: 39.16 ft (11.94 m)
- LWL: 30.58 ft (9.32 m)
- Beam: 11.50 ft (3.51 m)
- Engine: Nissan-Chrysler diesel engine

Hull appendages
- Keel: long keel
- Ballast: 8,800 lb (3,992 kg)
- Rudder: keel-mounted rudder

Rig
- Rig type: Cutter rig

Sails
- Sailplan: Cutter
- Total sail area: 811 sq ft (75.3 m^{2})

The Landfall 39 (Amy) is a Taiwanese sailboat that was designed by Ron Amy and first built in 1974.

The design is sometimes confused with the C&C Design/Robert Perry-designed 1985 boat of the same name, although the two designs are unrelated.

== Production ==
The design was built by Sino American Yacht Industrial Company, Limited in Taiwan, who completed 200 examples of the design between 1974 and the end of production in 1984.

The Landfall 39 design was developed into the Vagabond 39, using the old Landfall 39 hull molds in 1984 and built by Bluewater Yachts Builders Limited, also of Taiwan.

== Design ==
The Landfall 39 is a recreational keelboat, built predominantly of fiberglass, with wood trim. It has a cutter rig, a rounded raked stem, a canoe transom, a keel-mounted rudder controlled by a wheel and a fixed long keel. It displaces 23,500 lb (10,659 kg) and carries 8,800 lb (3,992 kg) of ballast.

The boat has a draft of 5.58 ft (1.70 m) with the standard keel fitted. The boat is fitted with a Nissan-Chrysler diesel engine.

The design has a hull speed of 7.41 kn (13.72 km/h).

== See also ==
- List of sailing boat types
