= Baba 30 =

1977 sailboat

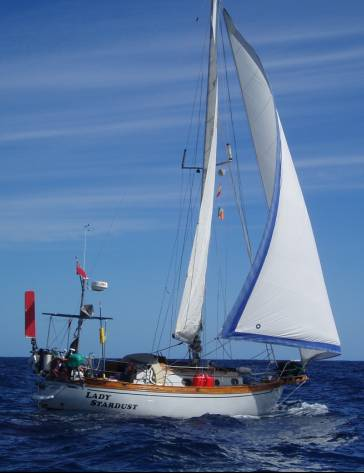
The baba is a classic looking modern yacht.

The Baba 30 was the smallest craft in the range but very popular, with some 170 having been built. They were built as sturdy vessels suitable for making long offshore and ocean passages needing only a couple of people to crew the boat. Although capable of sleeping 5 people they are generally sailed by couples. Most of these boats can be found in NW America but are also spread all around the world's ports and anchorages.

== History ==
In 1977 Bob Berg, founder of Flying Dutchman International, commissioned yacht designer Robert Perry to design a new small luxury cruising yacht for him. The result was the range of Babas. Production soon started in Taiwan in the yard of Ta Shing. This yard is still producing high quality motoryachts. The yachts were transported to Seattle in the US, the home of Bob Berg. Many of the Babas produced still reside in the Puget Sound area. It is believed that the name of the boat came from the way the Taiwanese workers pronounced Bob Berg's name, Ba-Ba, which also means "father" in Chinese.

== Exterior ==
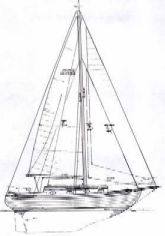
Cutaway long keel

The Baba 30 is made of a solid GRP (glass reinforced plastic) hull moulded with plank lines to give the effect of a timber hull. Alternating layers of 1.5oz Mat and 24 ounce woven roving were used in the hull's construction, six layers of this were used on most of the hull but 10 - 12 layers were used around the keel. It has a full keel with a cutaway forefoot. The keel contains encapsulated iron ballast. It also has a long rudder with a cutaway for the propeller. The boat has a canoe shaped stern.

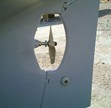
Protected Prop

The deck is cored fibreglass and is usually covered in extensive teak. The coachroof is treated the same. The first Babas were supplied with wooden spars but many of the boats have since been upgraded to aluminium mast and boom. Early Babas had no lower shrouds, but these were soon added after a dismasting. The rig is a traditional cutter style and a characteristic feature of many of Robert Perry's boats from this stable is a 4 ft laminated teak bowsprit which supports the forestay/headsail. A large platform sits on the bowsprit supporting two anchor rollers, a set-up typical on many long distance cruisers where two anchors are desirable in many exposed anchorages. Most Babas are fitted with Edson or similar wheel steering systems, however a few tiller steered versions exist.

== Interior ==
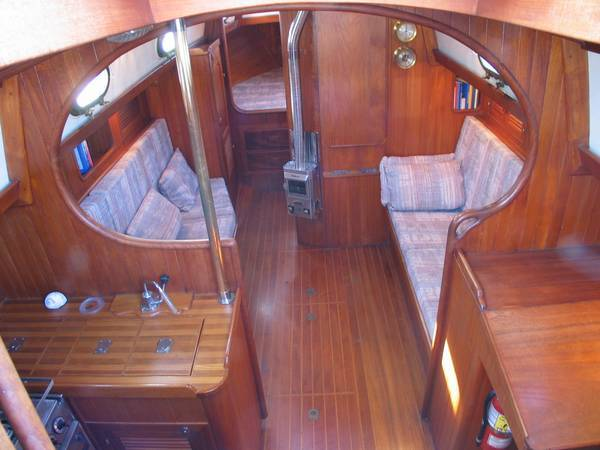
Baba Interior

The interior of the Baba contains a lot of custom teak work. Some versions of the boat have the entire interior staved with teak. The cabin sole is made from teak planking separated with holly strips. It has a very spacious-feeling 6'4" of headroom. Sleeping berths consist of a spacious V berth with good storage below and access to the chain locker via louvred doors, a full length berth in the main cabin on either side of the boat and on many models, a quarter berth on the aft starboard quarter, however in some models this was replaced by extra stowage. A small galley is built on the port aft side and opposite is a spacious chart table. Forward on the starboard side are the heads. The engine is mounted below the cabin companionway and is boxed in with a substantial teak housing. There are lockers and stowage areas all over the boat. The Baba 30 typically came with two separate water tanks which reside under the port and starboard berths, each holding about 100 L (25 US gal). However many variants of this tankage have been discovered on different Babas.

== Baba Sailing Boats ==
The range of Baba cruising yachts includes the Baba 30, Baba 35 and the Baba 40. The number represents the length, on deck, in feet. These yachts were designed by Robert Perry and built by Ta Shing Yacht Building Company, Ltd. in Tainan, Taiwan from 1978 through 1985. Other variations of these yachts came later in the Panda and Tashiba models.

== Hull Specifications ==
Specifications	
Length on deck	29’9"
Length Water Line	24’6"
Beam	10’3"
Draft	4’10"
Displacement	12,500 lbs
Ballast	5,000 lbs
D/L	379
SA/D	15.0
Cruising speed	5.5 Knts

== Engine Details ==
The early Babas were often supplied with a Volvo Penta MD11c 23BHP Engine, however later versions were generally shipped with a Yanmar engine. A single fuel tank capable of holding approximately 100 L (25 US gal) of diesel is located midships in the bilge forward of the engine
