= Orion 50 =

Sailboat class

Development
- Designer: Gary Mull
- Location: United States
- Year: 1983
- No. built: 7
- Builder: Ta Shing Yacht Building
- Name: Orion 50

Boat
- Displacement: 36,600 lb (16,601 kg)
- Draft: 6.50 ft (1.98 m)

Hull
- Construction: Fiberglass
- LOA: 49.50 ft (15.09 m)
- LWL: 42.50 ft (12.95 m)
- Beam: 14.50 ft (4.42 m)
- Engine: Perkins 4-236 diesel engine, 85 hp (63 kW)

Hull appendages
- Keel: fin keel
- Ballast: 14,000 lb (6,350 kg) of lead
- Rudder: skeg-mounted rudder

Rig
- General: masthead ketch
- I foretriangle height: 58.50 ft (17.83 m)
- J foretriangle base: 18.54 ft (5.65 m)
- P mainsail luff: 52.00 ft (15.85 m)
- E mainsail foot: 15.33 ft (4.67 m)

Sails
- Mainsail area: 398.58 sq ft (37.029 m^{2})
- Jib/genoa area: 542.30 sq ft (50.381 m^{2})
- Total sail area: 1,118.65 sq ft (103.926 m^{2})

Racing
- PHRF: 126 (average)

The Orion 50 is a sailboat designed by American Gary Mull and first built in 1983. The design is out of production.

== Production ==
The boat was built by Ta Shing Yacht Building in Taiwan, which completed seven examples between 1983 and 1987.

== Design ==
The Orion 50 is a recreational keelboat, built predominantly of fiberglass, with wood trim. It has a masthead ketch rig, a skeg-mounted rudder and a fixed fin keel. It displaces 36,600 lb (16,601 kg) and carries 14,000 lb (6,350 kg) of lead ballast.

The boat has a draft of 6.50 ft (1.98 m) with the standard keel and is fitted with a Perkins 4-236 diesel engine of 85 hp (63 kW). The fresh water tank holds 200 U.S. gallons (760 L; 170 imp gal) and the diesel fuel tank also holds 200 U.S. gallons (760 L; 170 imp gal).

The boat has a PHRF racing average handicap of 126 with a high of 126 and low of 126. It has a hull speed of 8.74 kn (16.19 km/h).

== See also ==
- List of sailing boat types
