= Victory Tug =

Example of a 1987 37' Lord Nelson Victory Tug cruising in Puget Sound, Washington, USA. (2006 photo)

The Lord Nelson Victory Tug is a brand of recreational trawler designed by James Backus and produced by Lord Nelson Yachts, Inc. based in Seattle, Washington in the United States.

Delivery of the first 37-foot hull was in 1983. A total of eighty-six Victory Tugs ranging in length from 37 to 49 feet (11 to 15 m) were built. The tugs are no longer in production, the last one being delivered in 1997.

== Models ==
No. Produced	Length Overall (feet/meters)	Draft	Staterooms / Heads	Diesel Engine hp (typical)	Typical Cruising Speed	Range
75	36' 11" / 11m	3' 6" / 1.1m	1 / 1	150 × 1	7 knots	1,200 mi
3	40' 11" / 13m	4' 4" / 1.3m	1 / 1	210 × 1	7.5 knots	1,000 mi
8	48' 10" / 15m	5' 8" / 1.7m	2 / 2	225 × 2	9 knots	3,000 mi

== Similar boats ==
Other motor yachts built in the style of a tugboat include American Tugs manufactured by Tomco Marine Group, Inc., in La Conner, Washington, USA; Nordic Tugs built in Burlington, Washington, USA; Ranger Tugs made in Kent, Washington, USA; and the Sundowner Tug (no longer in production).
