= Taswell (yacht) =

Sailboat brand

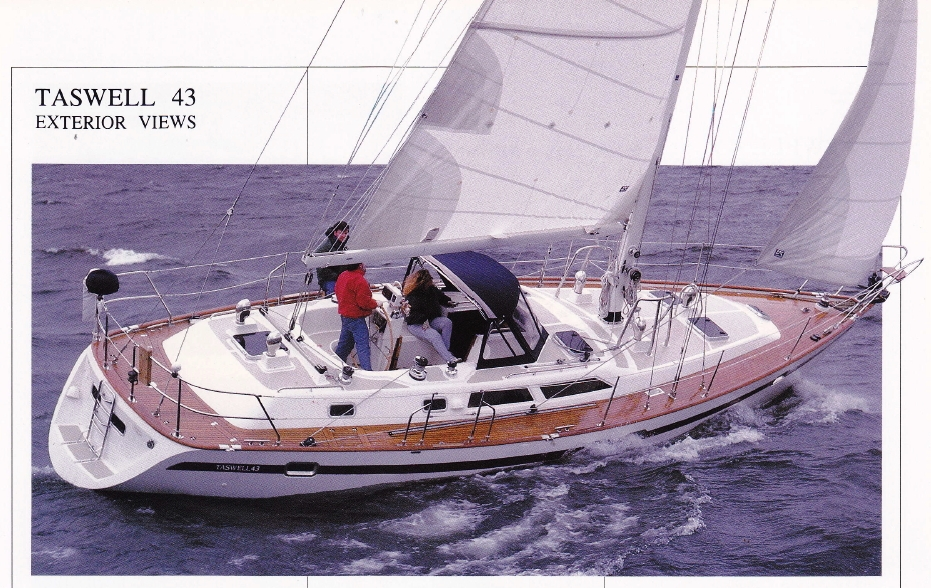
Taswell 43 Center Cockpit

Taswell is a brand of sailboat built by TaShing Yachts in Tainan City, Taiwan from 1986 to 2002. The Taswell sail yachts designed by Bill Dixon were ranged from 43/44 ft, 49/ 50 ft, 56 ft, 58 ft, 60 ft and up to 72 ft with both Center Cockpit and All Season versions.

Started with 43 ft in 1986 and ended up with 72 ft hull #2 in 2002, there are 117 Taswell sailboats have been built.

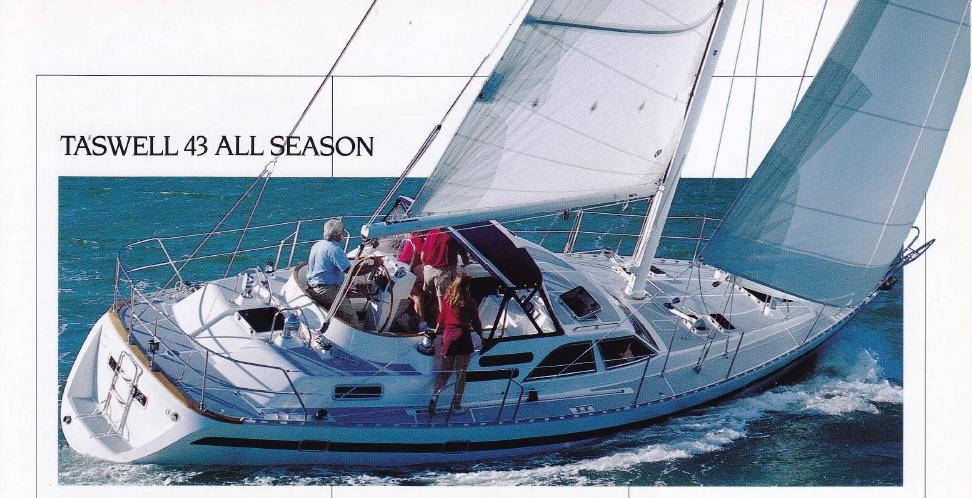
Taswell 43 All Season
