= Recreational trawler =

Pleasure boat resembling a fishing trawler

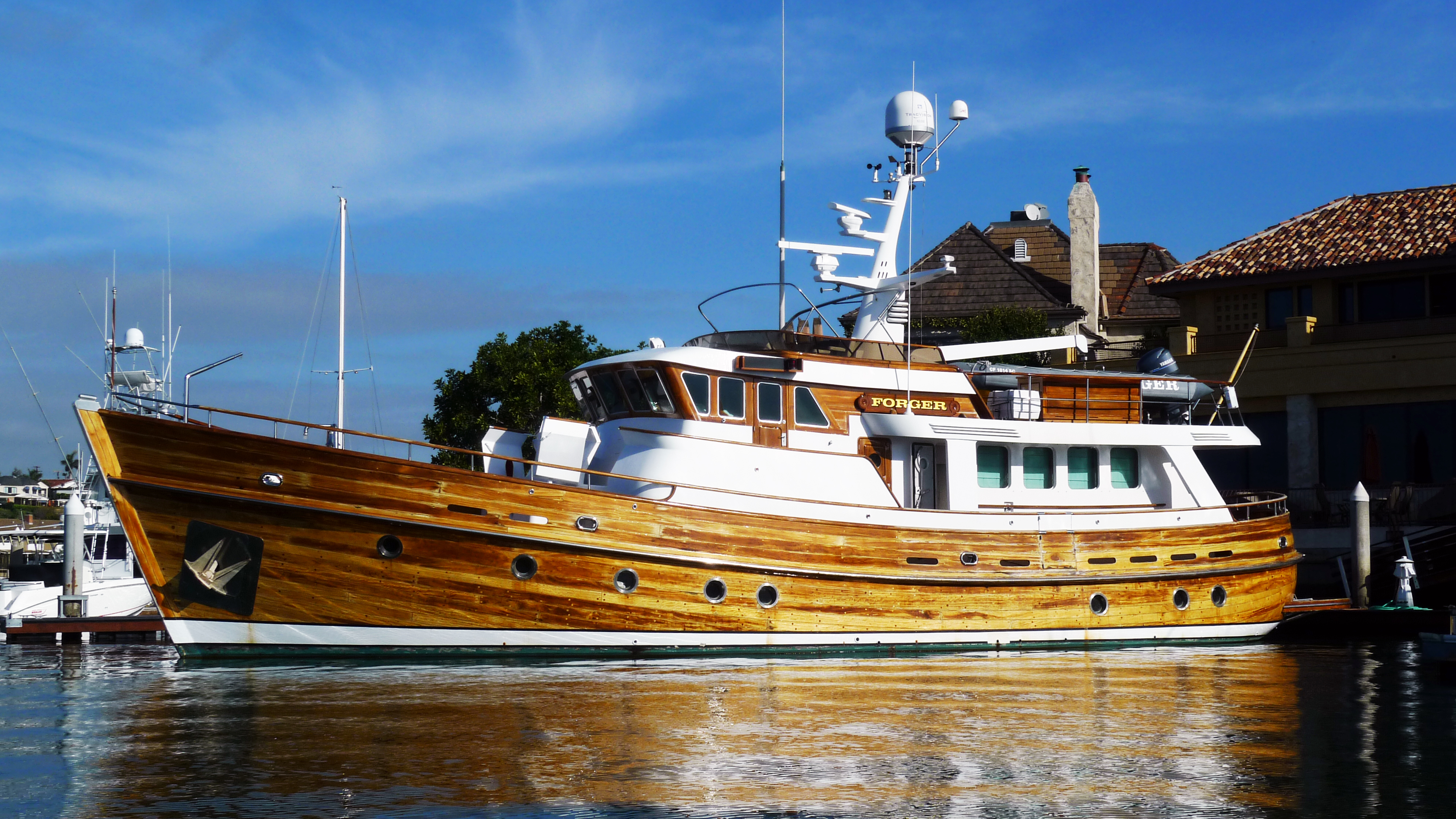
72 foot custom built single-screw recreational trawler with a range of 4000 miles

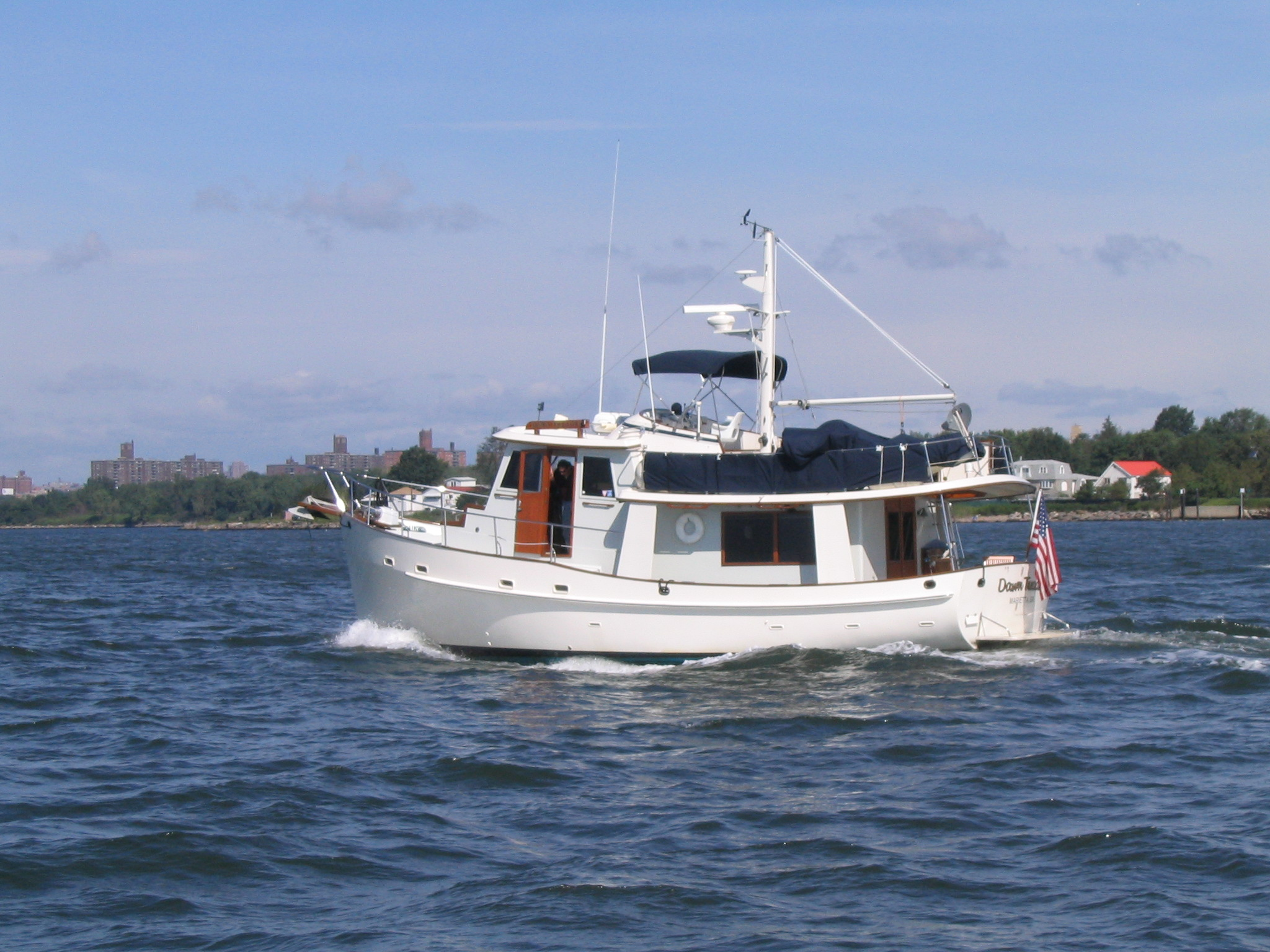
Kadey-Krogen 42 foot cruising trawler

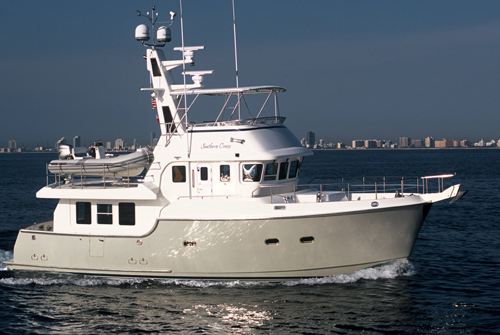
Nordhavn 47 foot trawler yacht

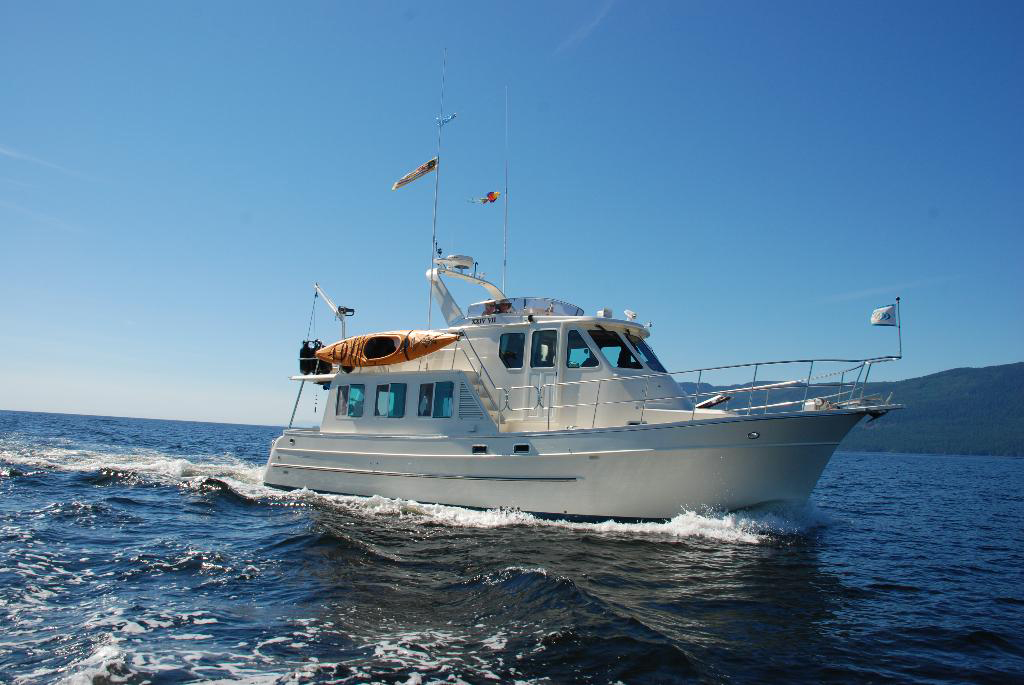
North Pacific 43 foot pilothouse trawler yacht

Recreational trawlers are pleasure boats that resemble fishing trawlers. They may also be called cruising trawlers or trawler yachts. Within the category, however, are many types and styles of vessels.

A fishing trawler, for example, always has a displacement hull for load-carrying capacity. Recreational trawlers, on the other hand, are as likely to have a semi-displacement hull. However, with the rising cost of fuel and the lower fuel consumption (though also lower speed) offered by displacement hulls, they are gaining popularity among some buyers. These displacement models typically have a cruising speed of 7–9 knots (13–17 km/h) depending on the boat length. Their maximum speed is often no more than 10–12 knots (19–22 km/h), whereas semi-displacement hulls can attain 14–20 knots (26–37 km/h). Recreational trawlers need only a small engine; 80 hp (60 kW) can be adequate in a 42 ft (13 m) boat, which will use less than 25 hp (19 kW) to cruise.

== Details ==
Many United States production recreational trawlers have a style that includes features such as a raised pilothouse or offset deckhouse.

A popular feature is a "Portuguese bridge", which consists of a walkway behind the foredeck, in front and to the sides of the pilothouse windows, separated from the foredeck by a (generally) waist-high bulwark. The purpose of the Portuguese bridge is to deflect green water from slamming against the forward windows of the pilothouse. It gives a semi-sheltered area outside the pilothouse while underway. A secondary benefit is that it provides a "safe area" or handhold when it is necessary to be on the foredeck in inclement weather. And lastly, it provides additional storage space for lines, fire extinguisher, spare anchor, drogue, etc., if the builder has provided access doors and lockers on the inside of the bridge.

Trawlers are most often offered in lengths ranging from 35 to 60 feet (11 to 18 m), or more. Most are built for long term cruising of regional and worldwide destinations. Combined with large fuel tanks, they can cruise far before needing to be refuelled. They can be home for between 2 and 8 persons for many days and can be a permanent home.

Usually trawlers have a single engine, though twin-engine installations are also available from some builders. They have a large fuel capacity. Fuel range is normally 1,500–3,000 miles on smaller vessels, even greater for those over 45 ft (14 m) in length. When combined with the slower speeds of a displacement hull, these features give such vessels far greater range and economy than similarly sized planing boats. A large engine room under the main cabin is another feature of true cruising trawlers. Many also include a diesel generator of 5–20 kW to power domestic appliances, bow thrusters, dinghy cranes, and similar equipment.

In the United States, recreational trawlers are made by over 70 builders and manufacturers.

== See also ==
- Kadey-Krogen Yachts
- Nordhavn
- North Pacific Yachts
- Victory Tug
- Fishing trawler
- Naval trawler
