= Robert Perry (yacht designer) =

American yacht designer

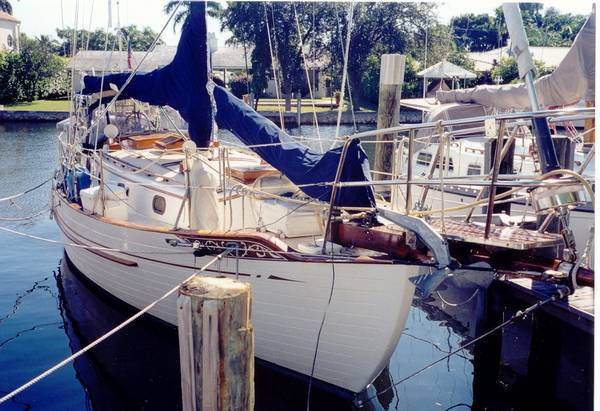
The Tayana 37 is one of Perry's most famous and iconic designs.

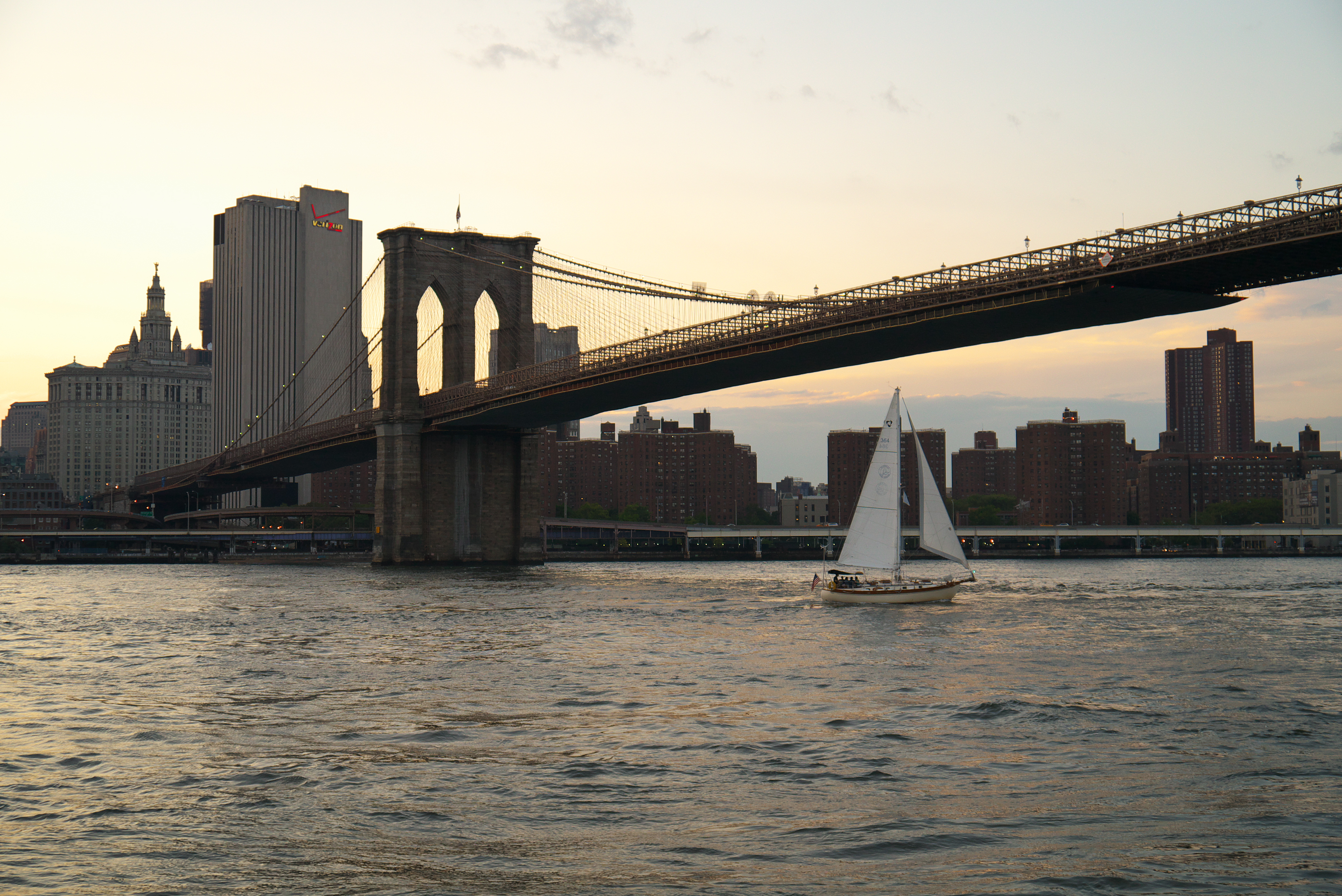
A Tayana 37 under sail on the East River in New York passes under the Brooklyn Bridge.

Robert H. Perry is a U.S. yacht designer based in Seattle, Washington. Among his designs are some of the most successful cruising yachts in modern cruising such as the Tatoosh 42, Tayana 37 and Valiant 40. Through his career he has designed boats for many well recognized names in the yachting industry, such as Tayana, Cheoy Lee, Valiant, Baba, Ta Shing, Islander, Passport and Saga. Perry has taught yacht design at Evergreen State College.

== Early life ==
In 1957 when Robert H. Perry was twelve, he and his family moved from Sydney, Australia to Vancouver, British Columbia. He writes that the trip made a lasting impression on him and spurred his interest in yacht design. At the beginning of his ninth-grade year, his family moved to Mercer Island, Washington, an area renowned for its school system. Here, his interest in sailboats really clicked. He met famous designer William Garden, joined the local yacht club, and excelled at mechanical drawing. Perry graduated with a 1.69 GPA from Mercer Island High School in 1964. The only local college that would accept him (and on a probationary status) was Seattle University. He enrolled as a mechanical engineering student, but dropped out after four years. Although the Vietnam War was growing and called him for enlistment, his childhood history of petit mal seizures made him ineligible.

== Career ==
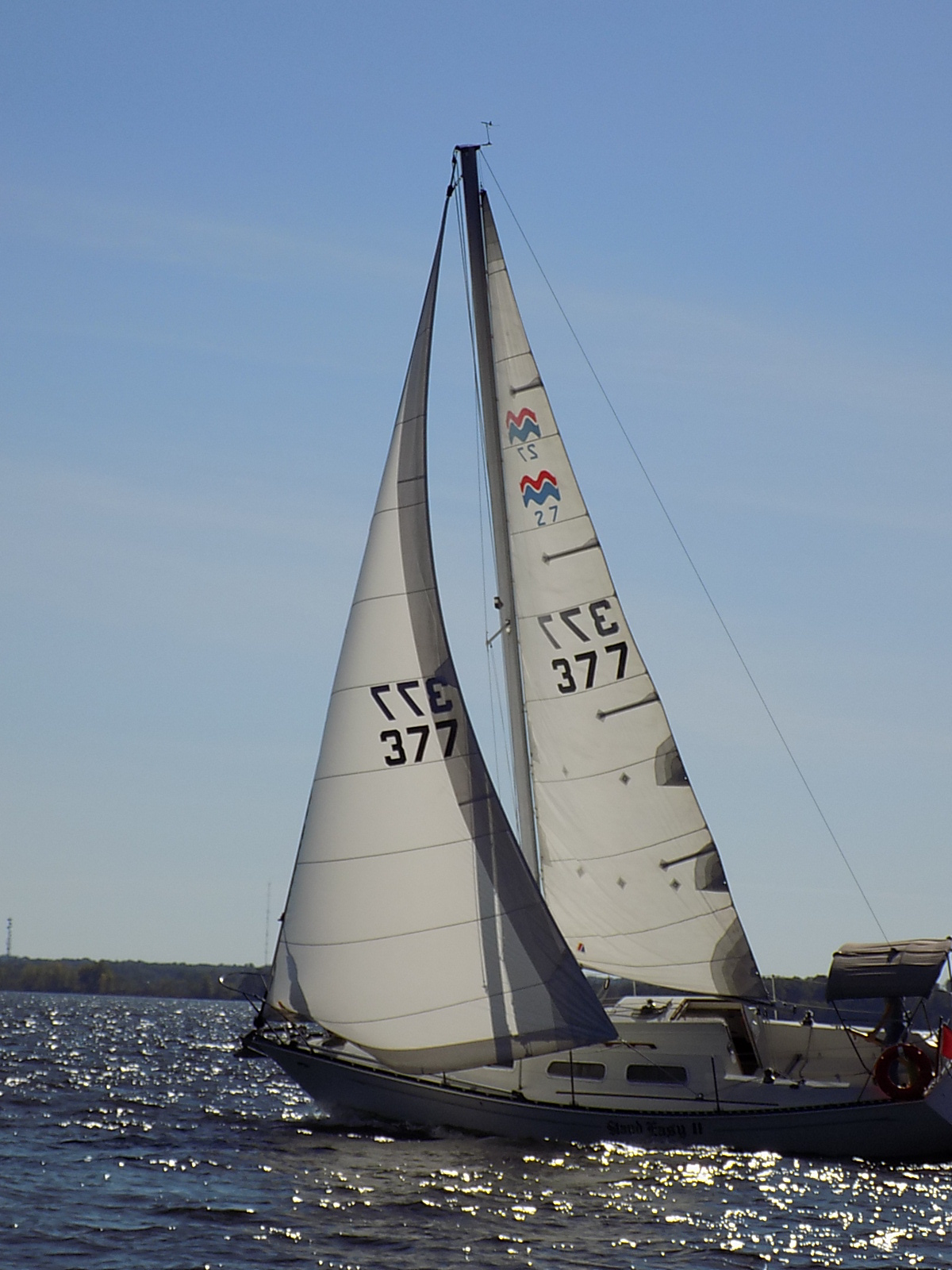
Mirage 27 designed by Perry

In 1970, Jay Benford gave Perry his first job as a yacht designer. Benford was promoting ferrocement boats in Seattle. Soon, Perry had his first published design, a 47-foot ketch in National Fisherman. Boatbuilder John Edwards who would found Hans Christian Yachts sent a letter to Perry in response to the 47-foot ketch. Eventually, this relationship would lead to Perry's first design, the CT 54, a clipper-bowed ketch. Ted Brewer consulted and helped Perry with the design. Ta Chaio Brothers, a Taiwanese yard built the CT 54 and the larger CT 65.

Simultaneously, Perry was working on what would be his landmark design, the Valiant 40. Along with Nathan Rothman and Sylvia and Stanley Dabney, he would design the first "performance cruiser." They all met at Benford's ferro-cement studio, but even as Perry moved to work for Dick Carter they continued to strategize about building a bluewater cruising boat like the Westsail 32 that would have better performance. Rothman contacted Uniflite, a Bellingham, Washington boat builder, and by 1974 the first Valiant rolled off their line. The design combined the classic canoe stern cruiser shape with a fin keel and skeg hung rudder instead of the traditional full keel.

These two starts led to more design commissions for Islander Yachts and Tayana Yachts. Perry became a popular designer for Taiwan-built boats.

== Recent ==
Perry designed the latest (and largest) yacht for Pacific Seacraft, the SouthSea 61, beginning work in 2007.

Perry also designed a unique long narrow 62 foot double ended daysailer built at the Northwest School of Wooden Boatbuilding in Port Hadlock, Washington, and launched in March, 2014. This design was inspired by a number of famous classic vessels including vessels designed by L. Francis Herreshoff, Bruce King and Bill Garden. Perry was selected to create the design due to his past very successful double ended designs and the recent success of a number of his designs on the race course.

== Awards ==
- 1979, Yacht Racing/Cruising Magazine, Medal of Achievement for Performance Cruising Design
- 1989, Cruising World Magazine, Cruising Hall of Fame
- 1995, American Boatbuilders Hall of Fame, Valiant 40 inducted into Hall of Fame
- 2023, National Sailing Hall of Fame inductee

== Boat designs ==
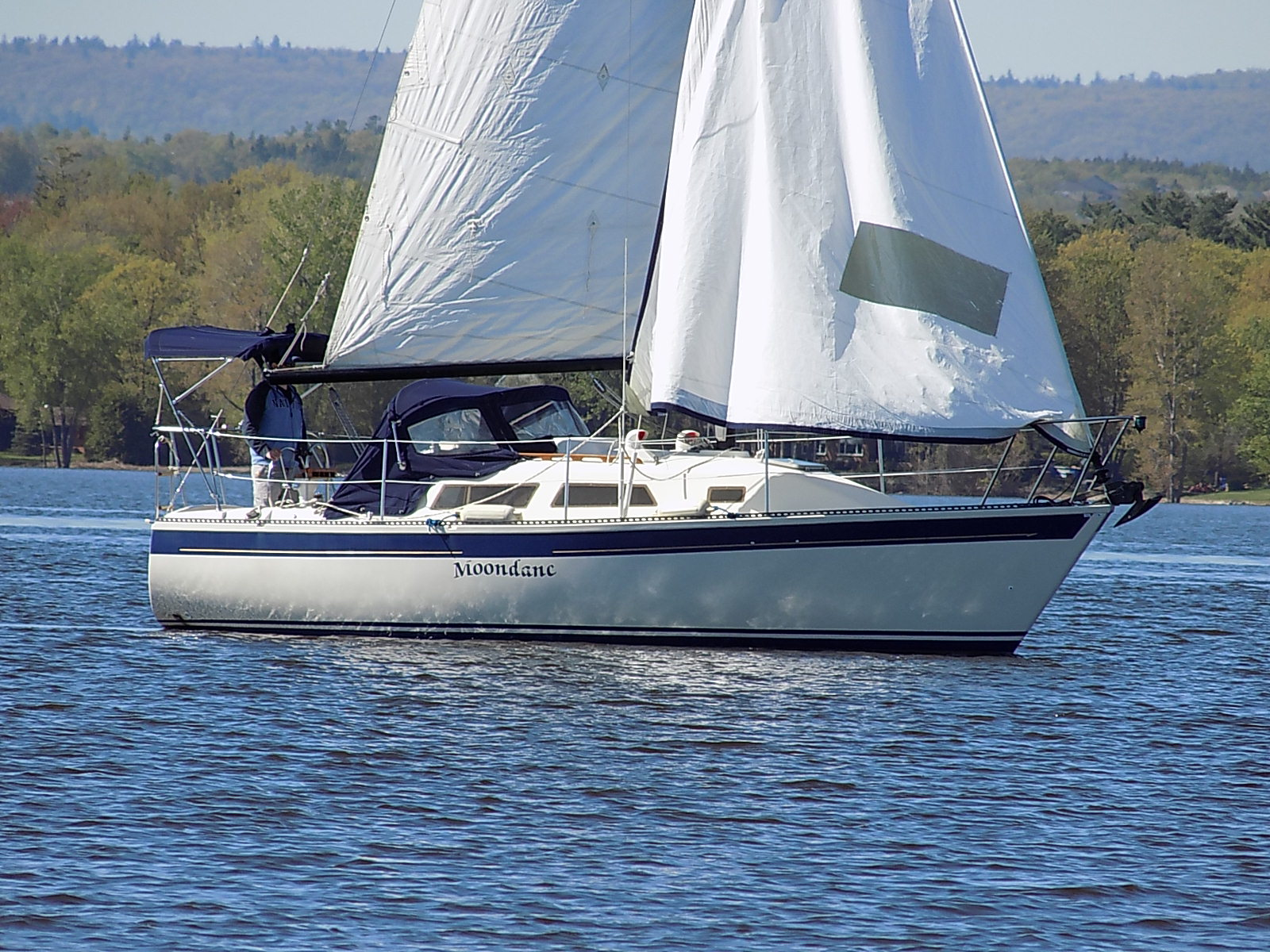
Perry's Aloha 27 design

Name	Length	First Built
Aloha 26	26.50 ft / 8.08 m	1979
Aloha 27	26.50 ft / 8.08 m	1984
Aloha 271	26.75 ft / 8.15 m	1987
Aloha 8.2	26.50 ft / 8.08 m	1980
Baba 30	30.00 ft / 9.14 m	1976
BABA 35	34.83 ft / 10.62 m	1979
BABA 40	39.83 ft / 12.14 m	1980
BABA 40 PILOT HOUSE	39.83 ft / 12.14 m	1980
BYSTEDT 30	30.00 ft / 9.14 m	1975
CHEOY LEE 35	34.83 ft / 10.62 m	1979
CHEOY LEE 43 MS	42.78 ft / 13.04 m	1981
CHEOY LEE 44	43.80 ft / 13.35 m	1979
CHEOY LEE 48	47.83 ft / 14.58 m	1980
CT-37	36.67 ft / 11.18 m	1976
CT-54	54.00 ft / 16.46 m	1975
CT-56	55.50 ft / 16.92 m	1986
CT-65 / SCORPIO 72	64.83 ft / 19.76 m	1983
EO 36	35.83 ft / 10.92 m	1978
ESPRIT 37	37.00 ft / 11.28 m	1977
FLYING TIGER 10M	32.66 ft / 9.95 m	2005
GOLDEN WAVE 42	42.00 ft / 12.80 m	1981
HANS CHRISTIAN 34	34.00 ft / 10.36 m	1974
ISLANDER 26	25.83 ft / 7.87 m	1976
ISLANDER 28	27.92 ft / 8.51 m	1975
ISLANDER 32-2	31.96 ft / 9.74 m	1976
ISLANDER 32-3	31.96 ft / 9.74 m	1977
ISLANDER 34-2	34.33 ft / 10.46 m	1983
ISLANDER 38 C	38.00 ft / 11.58 m	1983
ISLANDER BAHAMA 26	26.00 ft / 7.92 m	1976
ISLANDER BAHAMA 28	27.92 ft / 8.51 m	1981
ISLANDER FREEPORT 36	35.75 ft / 10.90 m	1976
ISLANDER FREEPORT 38	38.00 ft / 11.58 m	1983
ISLANDER FREEPORT 41	41.00 ft / 12.50 m	1974
LAFITTE 44	44.33 ft / 13.51 m	1978
LAFITTE 66	66.00 ft / 20.12 m	1982
LANDFALL 39 (C&C)	38.75 ft / 11.81 m	1985
MARINER 39 (PERRY)	38.83 ft / 11.84 m	1981
MIRAGE 25 (PERRY)	25.17 ft / 7.67 m	1982
MIRAGE 26 (PERRY)	26.17 ft / 7.98 m	1976
Mirage 27 (Perry)	27.92 ft / 8.51 m	1982
Mirage 30	30.00 ft / 9.14 m	1983
Mirage 32	32.00 ft / 9.75 m	1987
Mirage 33	33.50 ft / 10.21 m	1982
Mirage 35	35.50 ft / 10.82 m	1983
NASSAU 45	44.92 ft / 13.69 m	1984
NORDIC 34	34.33 ft / 10.46 m	1985
Nordic 40	39.70 ft / 12.10 m	1982
NORDIC 44	43.83 ft / 13.36 m	1980
NORDIC 45 RS	45.33 ft / 13.82 m	1988
NORSEMAN 447	44.58 ft / 13.59 m	1980
NORSTAR 40	39.67 ft / 12.09 m	1995
NORSTAR 44	43.83 ft / 13.36 m	1995
PANDA 40	39.91 ft / 12.16 m	1983
PASSPORT 37	37.00 ft / 11.28 m	1984
PASSPORT 40	40.67 ft / 12.40 m	1980
PASSPORT 41	41.33 ft / 12.60 m	1987
PASSPORT 44	45.50 ft / 13.87 m	1995
PASSPORT 456	45.50 ft / 13.87 m	1995
PASSPORT 47	46.58 ft / 14.20 m	1983
PASSPORT 470 AC	47.00 ft / 14.33 m	1997
PASSPORT 50	50.00 ft / 15.24 m	1994
PERRY 41/ALOHA 41	40.83 ft / 12.44 m	1981
PERRY 47	46.58 ft / 14.20 m	1977
PH 41	41.00 ft / 12.50 m	1975
POLARIS 43	42.67 ft / 13.01 m	1979
RELIANCE 37	37.00 ft / 11.28 m	1981
SAGA 35	36.50 ft / 11.13 m	2000
SAGA 43	43.25 ft / 13.18 m	1996
SAGA 48	52.30 ft / 15.94 m	2003
SCORPIO 72	65.00 ft / 19.81 m	1982
SEAMASTER 46	46.00 ft / 14.02 m	1981
SOUTH PACIFIC 42	41.92 ft / 12.78 m	1988
SUN 27	27.50 ft / 8.38 m	1977
SUN 28	28.00 ft / 8.53 m	1977
SUN 838	27.50 ft / 8.38 m	1977
TASHIBA 31	31.19 ft / 9.51 m	1986
TASHIBA 36	36.00 ft / 10.97 m	1986
TASHIBA 36 PH	36.00 ft / 10.97 m	1986
TASHIBA 40	39.87 ft / 12.15 m	1984
TATOOSH 42	41.83 ft / 12.75 m	1980
TATOOSH 51	50.58 ft / 15.42 m	1983
Tayana 37	36.67 ft / 11.18 m	1976
TAYANA 47 CC	47.00 ft / 14.33 m	1991
TAYANA 47 DS	47.00 ft / 14.33 m	1991
TAYANA 52	52.42 ft / 15.98 m	1983
UNION 36	36.67 ft / 11.18 m	1977
VALIANT 32	32.00 ft / 9.75 m	1976
VALIANT 37	37.00 ft / 11.28 m	1977
VALIANT 39	39.33 ft / 11.99 m	1995
Valiant 40 (101-199)	39.92 ft / 12.17 m	1973
Valiant 40 (200-235)	39.92 ft / 12.17 m	1978
VALIANT 40 PH	39.82 ft / 12.14 m	1981
VALIANT 40-2	39.82 ft / 12.14 m	1981
VALIANT 42	42.00 ft / 12.80 m	1992
VALIANT 42RS	42.00 ft / 12.80 m	1992
VALIANT 47	47.00 ft / 14.33 m	1981
VALIANT 50	50.67 ft / 15.44 m	1997
VALIANT ESPRIT 37	37.00 ft / 11.28 m	1978
WESTSAIL 39	38.67 ft / 11.79 m	1979
WHITE WING 35/36	35.93 ft / 10.95 m	1980
YACHTCRAFT 32	31.92 ft / 9.73 m	1976
