= Nordhavn (yacht) =

Model of ocean-going yacht

Nordhavn is a trade name of a line of ocean-going trawler-styled motor yachts designed and produced by Pacific Asian Enterprises, Inc. (PAE).

== Overview ==
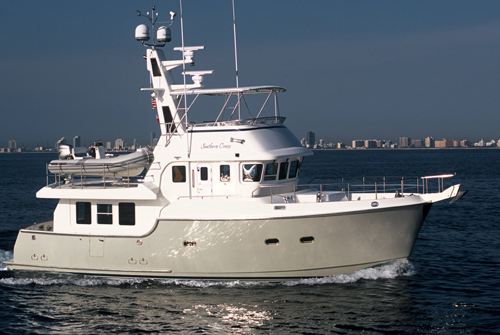
Nordhavn 47

Pacific Asian Enterprises was incorporated in 1978 in California. PAE designs, builds and markets offshore passagemaking vessels ranging from 41 to 120 feet (12 to 37 m) in length. The vessels are constructed under the supervision in Taiwan, China and Turkey.

One 40-foot (12 m) 'stock' Nordhavn was the smallest production powered vessel to circumnavigate the earth, from November 3, 2001 to June 30, 2002. It covered more than 24,000 nautical miles (44,000 km) over some 170 days at sea, starting and ending its circumnavigation at Dana Point, California.

== See also ==
- Jade Yachts
