= Aloha 27 =

1980s Canadian recreational keelbaot

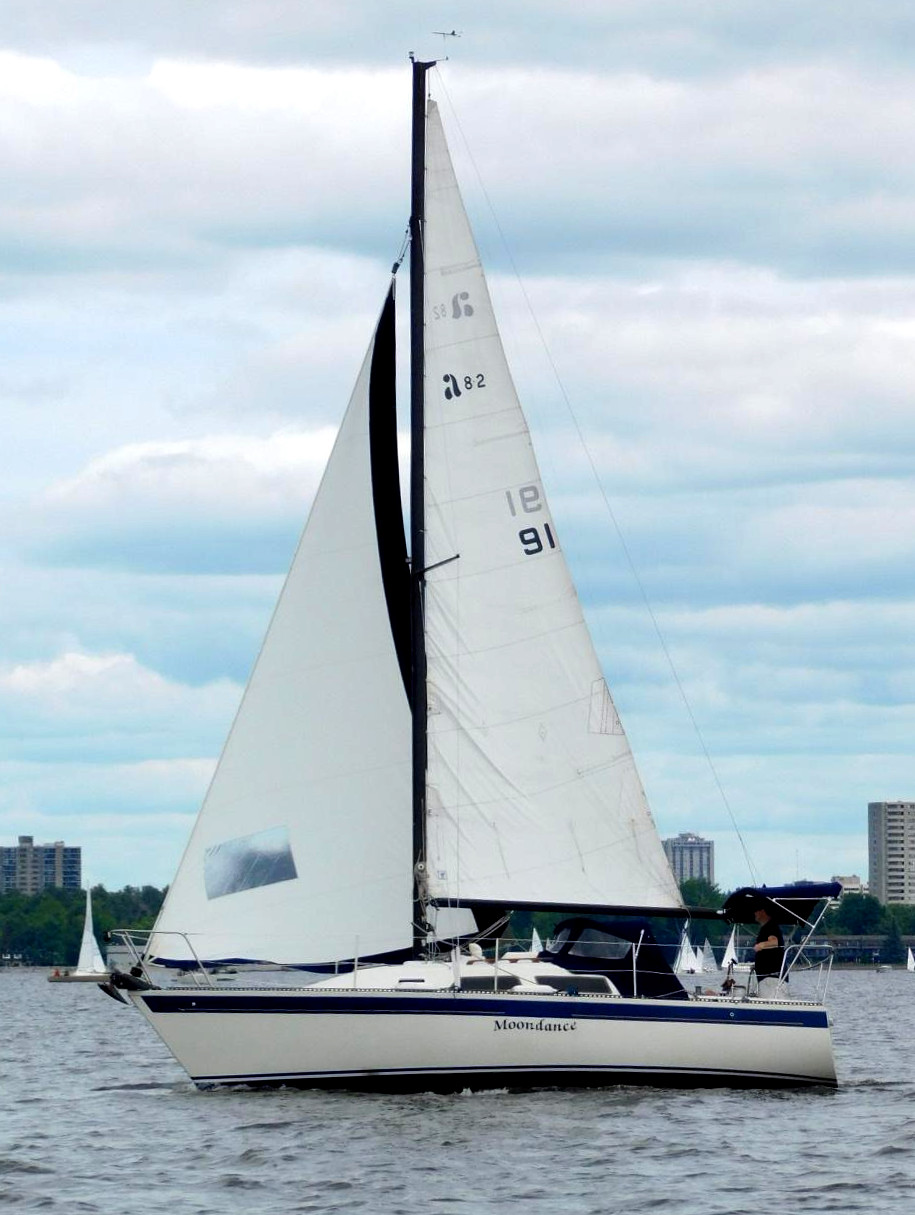
- Aloha 27 with 8.2 sails

Development
- Designer: Robert Perry
- Location: Canada
- Year: 1979
- No. built: 188
- Builder: Ouyang Boat Works
- Name: Aloha 27

Boat
- Displacement: 5,200 lb (2,359 kg)
- Draft: 4.33 ft (1.32 m)
- Air draft: 40.00 ft (12.19 m)

Hull
- Type: Monohull
- Construction: Fibreglass
- LOA: 26.75 ft (8.15 m)
- LWL: 22.50 ft (6.86 m)
- Beam: 9.50 ft (2.90 m)
- Engine: Inboard BMW, Volvo or Westerbeke diesel engine or an outboard motor

Hull appendages
- Keel: fin keel
- Ballast: 2,000 lb (907 kg)
- Rudder: skeg

Rig
- General: Fractional rigged sloop
- I foretriangle height: 30.00 ft (9.14 m)
- J foretriangle base: 10.75 ft (3.28 m)
- P mainsail luff: 31.75 ft (9.68 m)
- E mainsail foot: 10.25 ft (3.12 m) 1979-1981 (11.25 ft (3.43 m) post-1981 )
- Mast height: 33.00 ft (10.06 m)

Sails
- Mainsail area: 178.59 sq ft (16.592 m^{2})
- Jib/genoa area: 161.25 sq ft (14.981 m^{2})
- Total sail area: 339.84 sq ft (31.572 m^{2})

Racing
- PHRF: 207 (average)

The Aloha 27 is a recreational keelboat. 188 were built between 1979 and 1987 by Aloha Yachts. Aloha also market the same hull as the 26, 8.2, and 271.

== Design ==
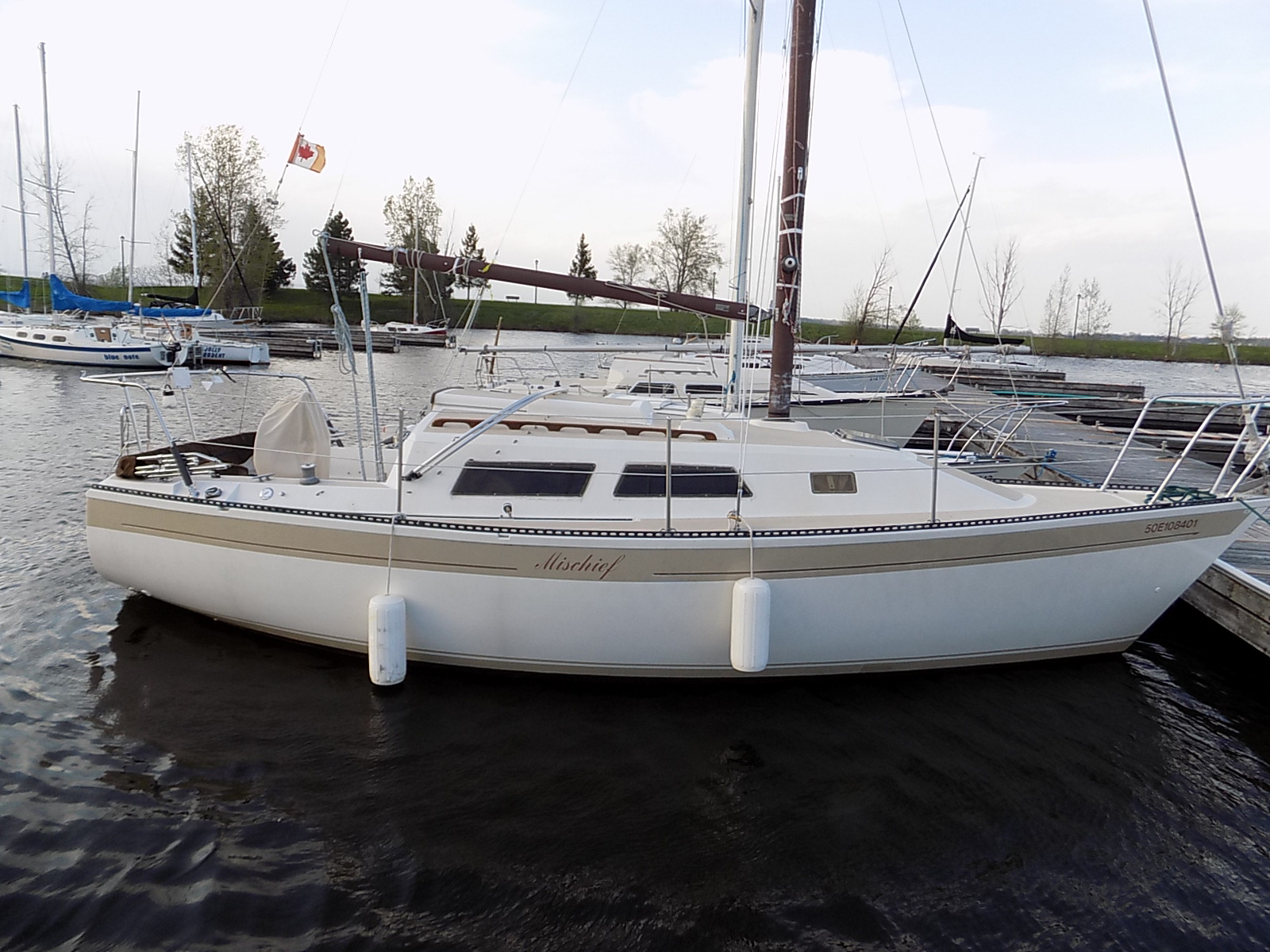
Aloha 27

Designed by Robert Perry, the fibreglass hull has an internally-mounted spade-type rudder and fixed fin keels. Ballast is encapsulated inside a fibreglass keel.

Early versions had a BMW powerplant of 7 hp (5 kW), which some owners found underpowered and that led to the Westerbeke engine of 10 hp (7 kW) being substituted. The fuel tank holds 12 U.S. gallons (45 L; 10.0 imp gal) and the fresh water tank has a capacity of 14 U.S. gallons (53 L; 12 imp gal).

They all have fractional sloop rigs.

The original production run boatshad Barient winches, tufted crushed velour cushions, oversized spars, pulpit and lifelines, and internal halyards.

It has a cabin suited to cruising.

The Aloha 27 has a PHRF racing average handicap of 207 and a hull speed of 6.53 kn (12.09 km/h).
