= Aloha 34 =

1970s Canadian recreational keelboat

Development
- Designer: Edward S. Brewer and Robert Walstrom
- Location: Canada
- Year: 1983
- Builder: Ouyang Boat Works
- Role: Cruiser
- Name: Aloha 34

Boat
- Displacement: 13,600 lb (6,169 kg)
- Draft: 5.50 ft (1.68 m)

Hull
- Type: monohull
- Construction: fibreglass
- LOA: 34.00 ft (10.36 m)
- LWL: 28.67 ft (8.74 m)
- Beam: 11.17 ft (3.40 m)
- Engine: inboard 27 hp (20 kW) diesel engine

Hull appendages
- Keel: fin keel
- Ballast: 4,700 lb (2,132 kg)
- Rudder: skeg-mounted rudder

Rig
- Rig type: Bermuda rig
- I foretriangle height: 43.50 ft (13.26 m)
- J foretriangle base: 14.00 ft (4.27 m)
- P mainsail luff: 37.75 ft (11.51 m)
- E mainsail foot: 12.00 ft (3.66 m)

Sails
- Sailplan: masthead sloop
- Mainsail area: 226.50 sq ft (21.043 m^{2})
- Jib/genoa area: 304.50 sq ft (28.289 m^{2})
- Total sail area: 531.00 sq ft (49.332 m^{2})

The Aloha 34 is a recreational keelboat. The boat was renamed the Aloha 10.4 in 1981, after its approximate length overall in metres. It was built by Ouyang Boat Works in Whitby, Ontario, Canada, from 1975, under its Aloha Yachts brand, but it is now out of production. From 1981 it was sold as the Aloha 10.4.

== Design ==
The Aloha 34 is built predominantly of fibreglass with a balsa-cored deck and with wood trim. It has a masthead sloop rig, a raked stem, a slightly angled transom, a skeg-mounter rudder, controlled by a wheel and a fixed swept fin keel or optional shoal draft keel. It displaces 13,600 lb (6,169 kg) and carries 4,700 lb (2,132 kg) of lead ballast. A tall rig was also available.

The boat has a draft of 5.50 ft (1.68 m) with the standard keel and 4.50 ft (1.37 m) with the optional shoal draft keel.

The boat is fitted with an inboard diesel engine of 27 hp (20 kW) for docking and maneuvering. The Aloha 10.4 version has a 21 hp (16 kW) Westerbeke diesel. The fuel tank holds 26 U.S. gallons (98 L; 22 imp gal) and the fresh water tank has a capacity of 60 U.S. gallons (230 L; 50 imp gal).

The design has sleeping accommodation for five people, with a double "V"-berth in the bow cabin, two settee berths in the main cabin and a quarter berth on the port side under the cockpit. The galley is located on the port side at the companionway ladder. The galley is U-shaped and is equipped with a two-burner stove, an ice box and a sink. The head is located just aft of the bow cabin on the port side. Cabin headroom is 6.58 ft (201 cm).

The design has a hull speed of 7.18 kn (13.30 km/h).
