= Aloha Yachts =

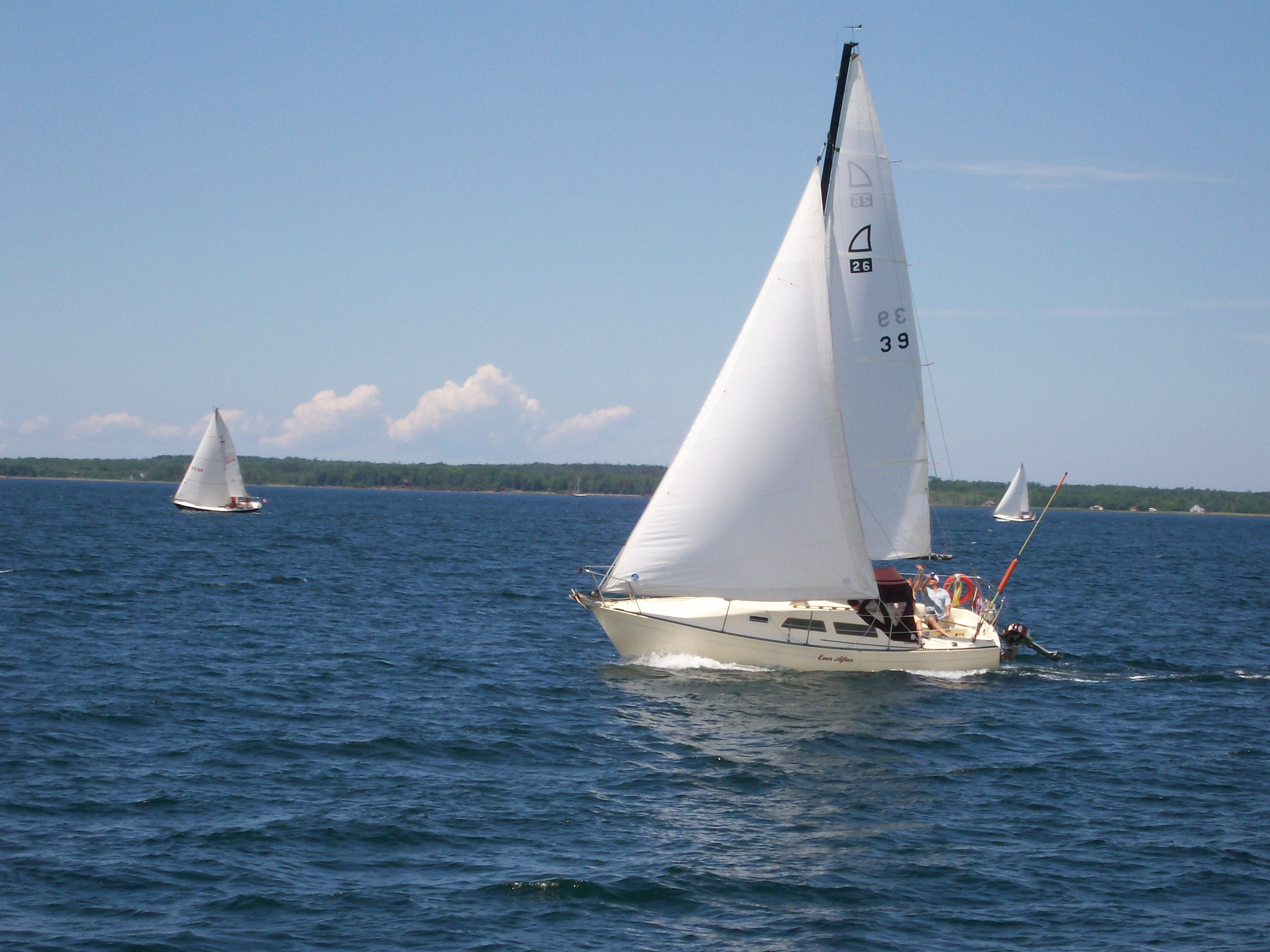
"Ever After", an Aloha 27 yacht designed by Robert Perry

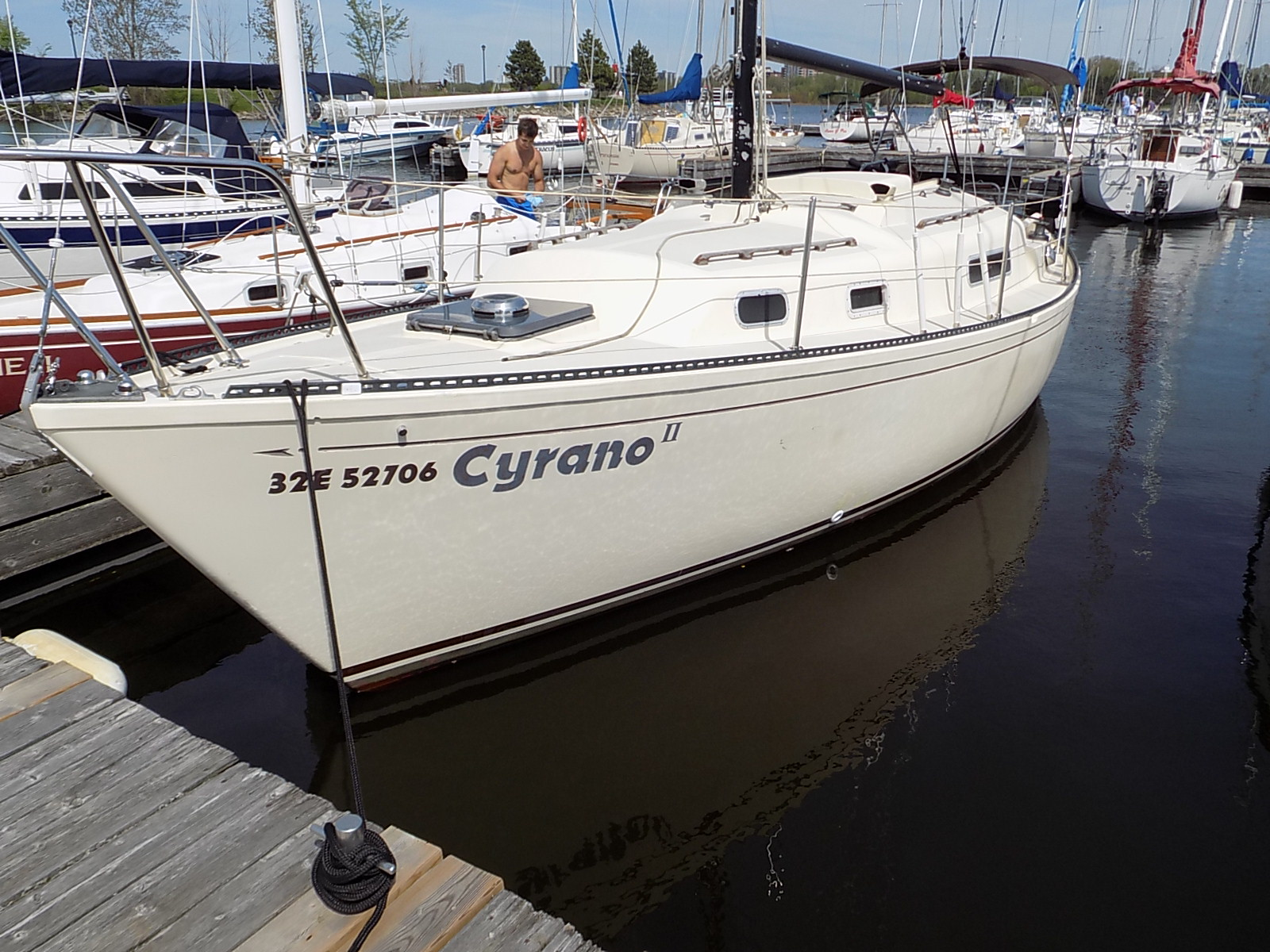
Aloha 28

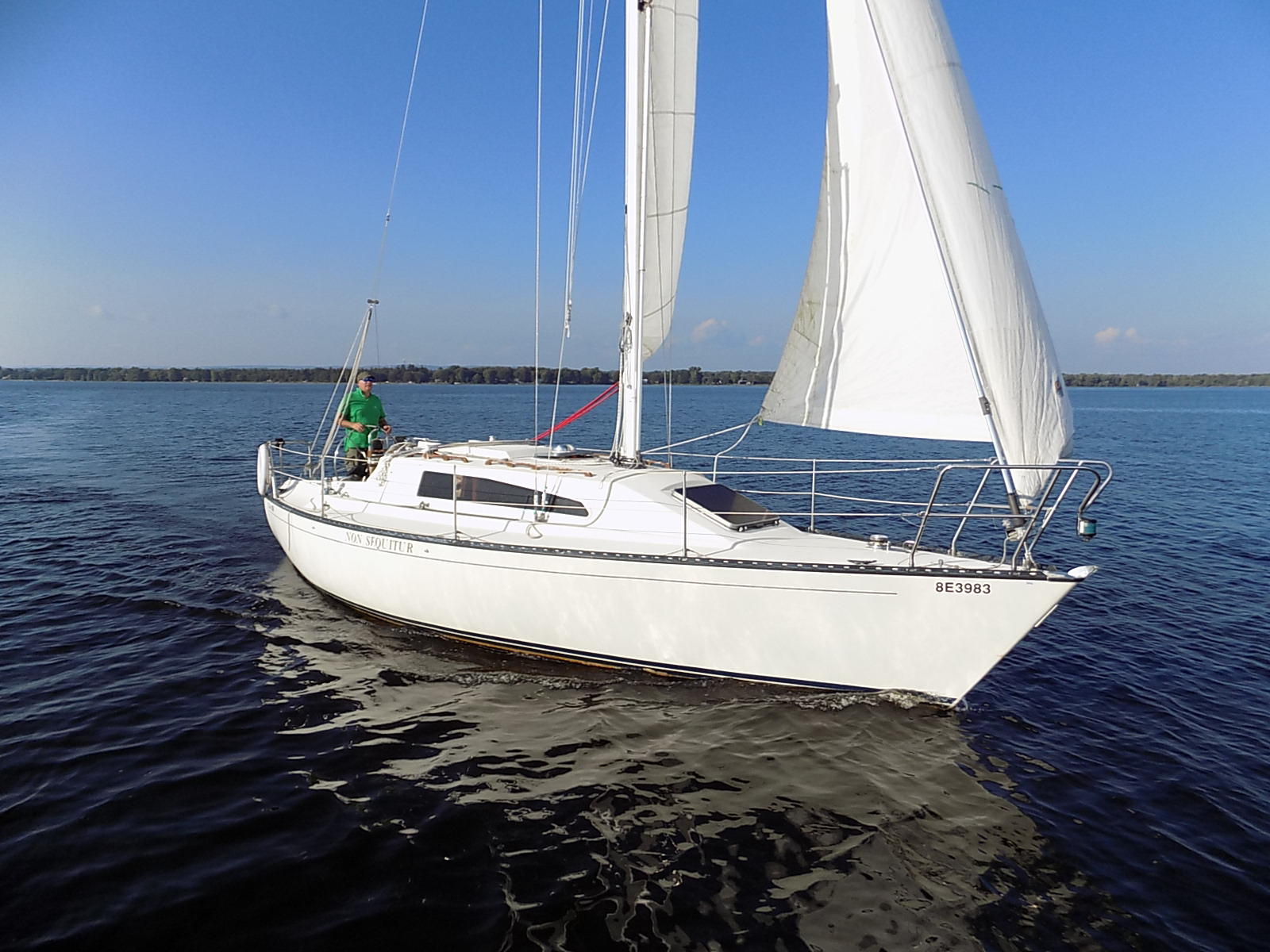
Aloha 30

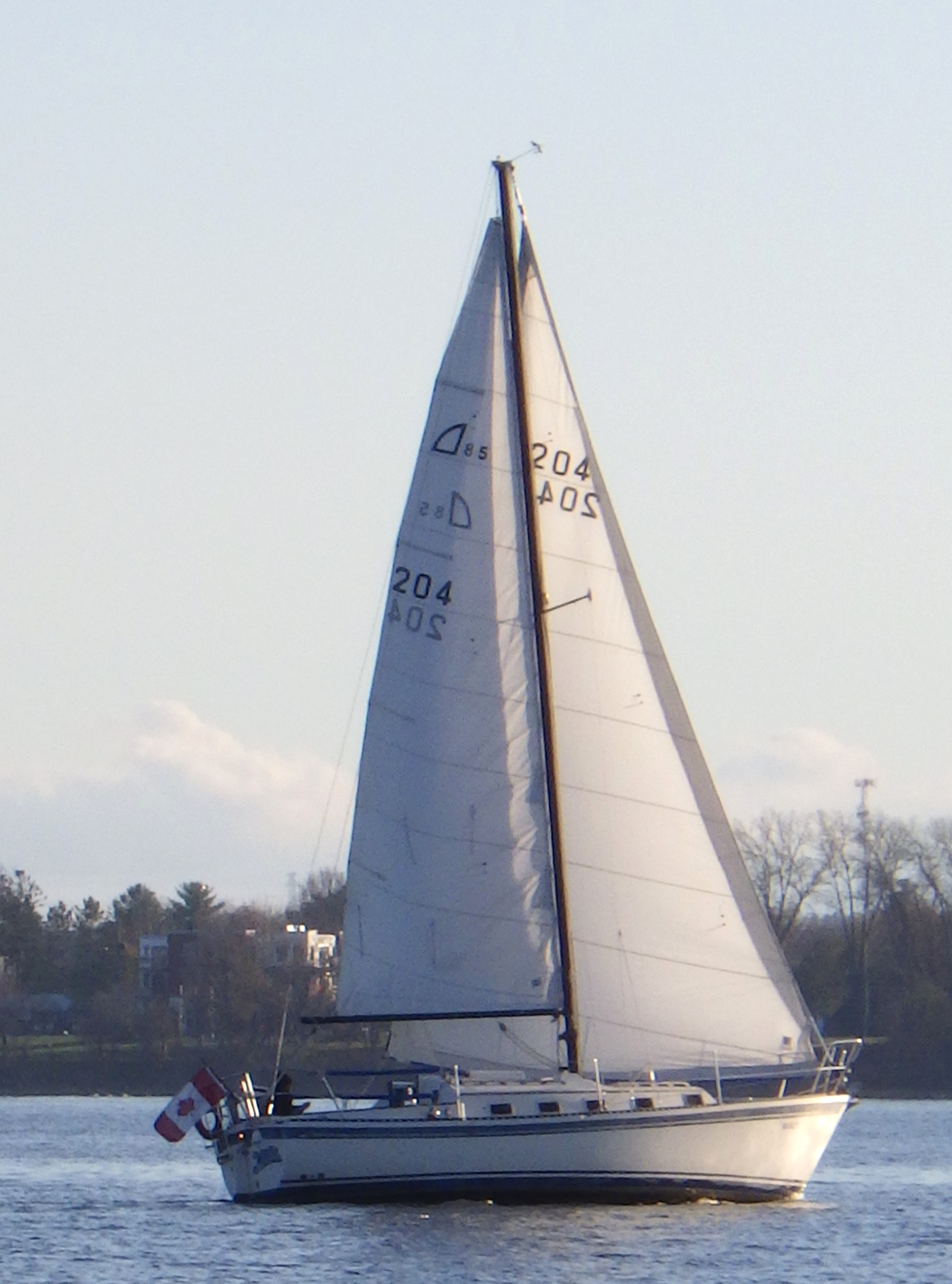
Aloha 8.5

Aloha Yachts were a range of sailing keelboats manufactured in Whitby, Ontario, Canada by Ouyang Boat Works, founded by Ti Ouyang who had previously worked for Whitby Boat Works.

== Boats ==
After producing a range of 16, 20 and 23 foot trailerable sailboats under the "Matilda" name, in 1973 Ouyang introduced the Aloha 28. Designed by Ted Brewer and Robert Wallstrom, it featured an outboard rudder.

This was followed in 1975 by the Aloha 34, also a Brewer and Wallstrom design. The Aloha 27 (also referred to as the 26, 8.2, and the 271), designed by Robert Perry, was added to the range in 1979. The Aloha 32, a sloop designed by Mark Ellis, followed in 1982 and the Aloha 30, designed by Ron Holland, in 1986.

The company also considered acting as North American agents for 41 and 47 foot yachts designed by Robert Perry to be manufactured in the Far East and sold under the Aloha-Perry name, but after trials with the prototype 41 foot model, decided not to pursue this arrangement.

A total of between 600 and 700 boats were constructed before the company encountered financial difficulties in a mid-1980s depression in the boat building business, and ceased trading.

== Production ==
Boats produced under the Aloha brand are:

- Aloha 28 - 1972
- Aloha 34 - 1975
- Aloha 27 - 1979
- Aloha 32 - 1979
- Aloha 34 - 1981
- Aloha 8.5 - 1983
- Aloha 30 - 1986
