= Aloha 8.5 =

Sailboat class

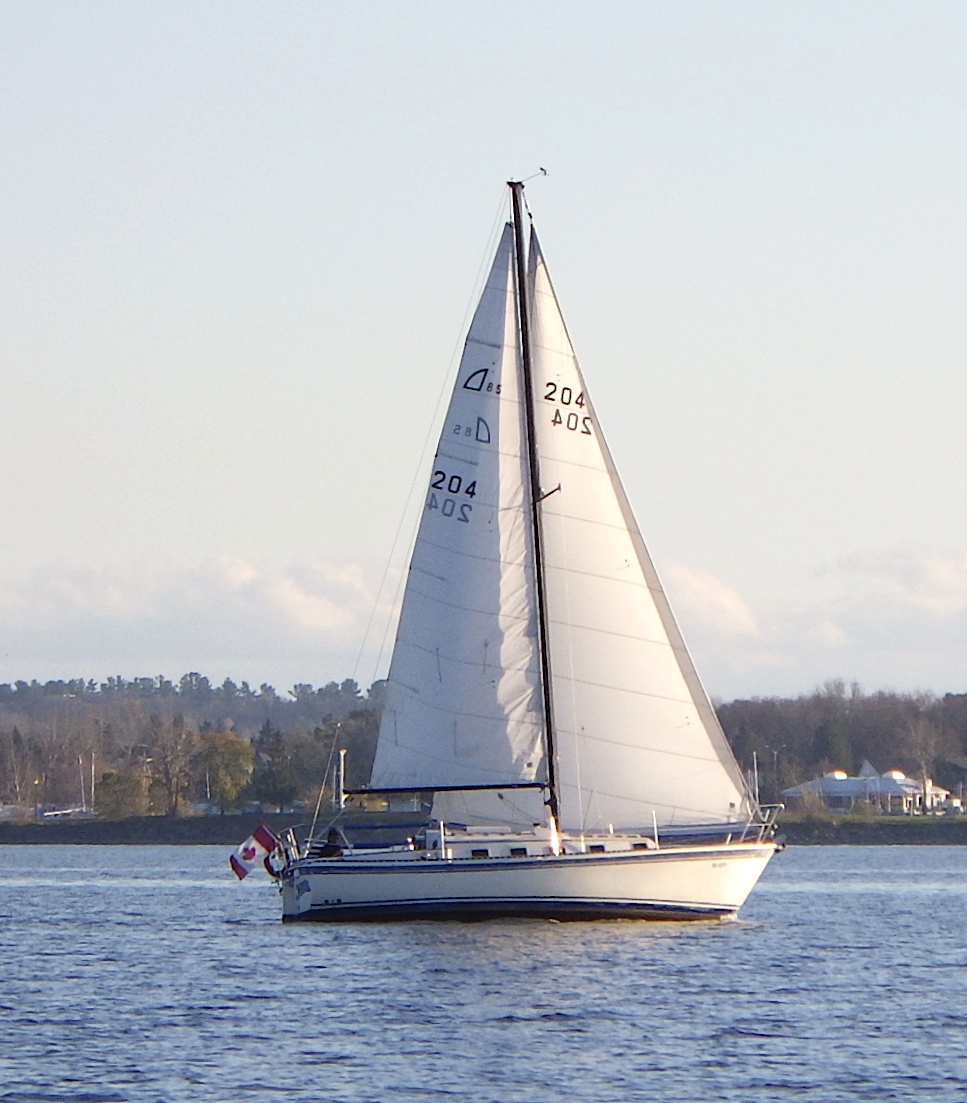

Development
- Designer: Edward S. Brewer
- Location: Canada
- Year: 1983
- Builder: Ouyang Boat Works
- Role: Cruiser
- Name: Aloha 8.5

Boat
- Displacement: 6,750 lb (3,062 kg)
- Draft: 4.30 ft (1.31 m)

Hull
- Type: monohull
- Construction: fibreglass
- LOA: 28.00 ft (8.53 m)
- LWL: 24.50 ft (7.47 m)
- Beam: 9.42 ft (2.87 m)
- Engine: Westerbeke 13 hp (10 kW) diesel engine

Hull appendages
- Keel: fin keel
- Ballast: 2,750 lb (1,247 kg)
- Rudder: transom-mounted rudder

Rig
- Rig type: Bermuda rig
- I foretriangle height: 37.00 ft (11.28 m)
- J foretriangle base: 12.25 ft (3.73 m)
- P mainsail luff: 32.00 ft (9.75 m)
- E mainsail foot: 10.50 ft (3.20 m)

Sails
- Sailplan: masthead sloop
- Mainsail area: 168.00 sq ft (15.608 m^{2})
- Jib/genoa area: 226.63 sq ft (21.055 m^{2})
- Total sail area: 394.63 sq ft (36.662 m^{2})

The Aloha 8.5 is a Canadian sailboat that was designed by Edward S. Brewer as a cruiser and first built in 1983.

The design is a development of the Aloha 28, incorporating five new opening ports on each side of the main cabin, additional brightwork and a new rig.

== Production ==
The design was built by Ouyang Boat Works in Whitby, Ontario, Canada, from 1983 to 1989, under its Aloha Yachts brand, but it is now out of production.

== Design ==
The Aloha 8.5 is a recreational keelboat, built predominantly of fibreglass, with wood trim. It has a masthead sloop rig, a raked stem, a plumb transom, a transom-hung rudder, with a partial skeg, controlled by a tiller and a fixed fin keel. It displaces 6,750 lb (3,062 kg) and carries 2,750 lb (1,247 kg) of ballast.

The boat has a draft of 4.30 ft (1.31 m) with the standard keel.

The boat is fitted with a Westerbeke diesel engine of 13 hp (10 kW) for docking and maneuvering. The fuel tank holds 12 U.S. gallons (45 L; 10.0 imp gal) and the fresh water tank has a capacity of 30 U.S. gallons (110 L; 25 imp gal).

The design has sleeping accommodation for five people, with a double "V"-berth in the bow cabin, two straight settee berths in the main cabin with one that folds into an upper berth on the port side. The galley is located on the starboard side at the companionway ladder. The galley is L-shaped and is equipped with a two-burner stove and a sink, with an ice box opposite on the port side. The head is located just aft of the bow cabin on the port side.

The design has a hull speed of 6.63 kn (12.28 km/h).

== Operational history ==
The boat is supported by an active class club, the Aloha Owners Association.

In a 1985 review for Canadian Yachting, Carol Nickle & Bryan Gooderham wrote, "key parameters such a sail area, displacement and ballast are all moderate. The beam is narrower than in some modern designs, but is carried well down toward the waterline. The wide waterline beam, combined with gently curving underbody sections and slight fullness in the bows, results in plenty of interior volume. Its underwater profile shows a fairly shallow, swept-back fin keel and a stout skeg leading into the transom-hung rudder. The shallow draft is no doubt handy for gunkholing and the skeg improves tracking ability and ease of steering."

== See also ==
- List of sailing boat types

Related development

- Aloha 28
