= Aloha 28 =

1970s Canadian recreational keelboat

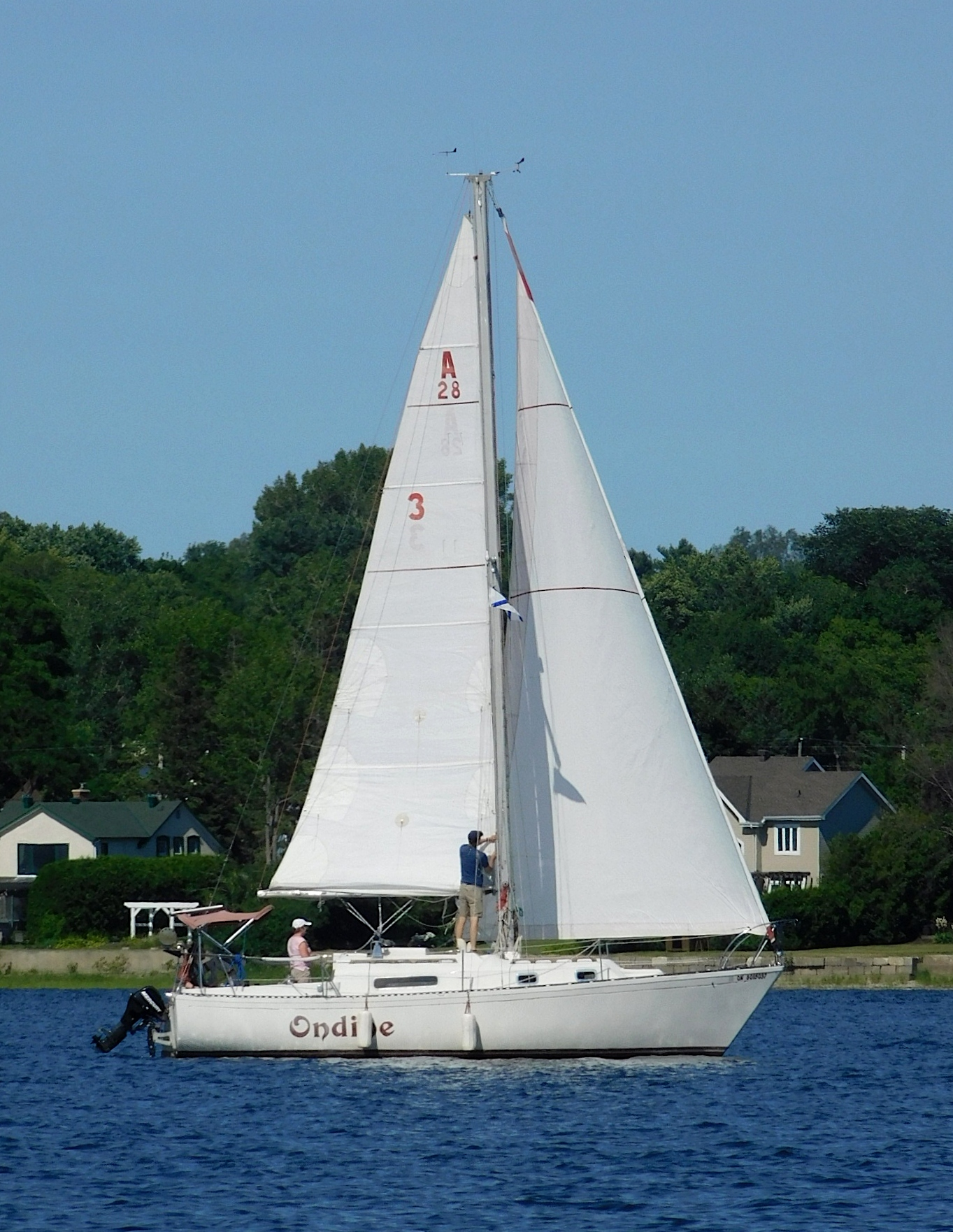

Development
- Designer: Edward S. Brewer and Robert Walstrom
- Location: Canada
- Year: 1972
- Builder: Ouyang Boat Works/Aloha Yachts
- Name: Aloha 28

Boat
- Displacement: 6,750 lb (3,062 kg)
- Draft: 4.33 ft (1.32 m)

Hull
- Type: Monohull
- Construction: Fiberglass
- LOA: 28.00 ft (8.53 m)
- LWL: 24.50 ft (7.47 m)
- Beam: 9.42 ft (2.87 m)
- Engine: Inboard motor

Hull appendages
- Keel: fin keel
- Ballast: 3,000 lb (1,361 kg)
- Rudders: transom-mounted, skeg-mounted rudder

Rig
- Rig type: Bermuda rig
- I foretriangle height: 35.50 ft (10.82 m)
- J foretriangle base: 12.00 ft (3.66 m)
- P mainsail luff: 30.40 ft (9.27 m)
- E mainsail foot: 10.50 ft (3.20 m)

Sails
- Sailplan: Masthead sloop
- Mainsail area: 159.60 sq ft (14.827 m^{2})
- Jib/genoa area: 213.00 sq ft (19.788 m^{2})
- Total sail area: 372.60 sq ft (34.616 m^{2})

The Aloha 28 is a recreational keelboat, that was designed by Edward S. Brewer and Robert Walstrom and first built in 1972.

The Aloha 28 design was developed into the Aloha 8.5 in 1983.

The Aloha 28 should not be confused with the Aloa 28, the successor to the Aloa 27 that has been built by the French shipyard Aloa Marine since 1972.

== Production ==
The boat was built by Ouyang Boat Works in Whitby, Ontario, Canada under its Aloha Yachts brand between 1972 and 1988, but it is now out of production.

== Design ==
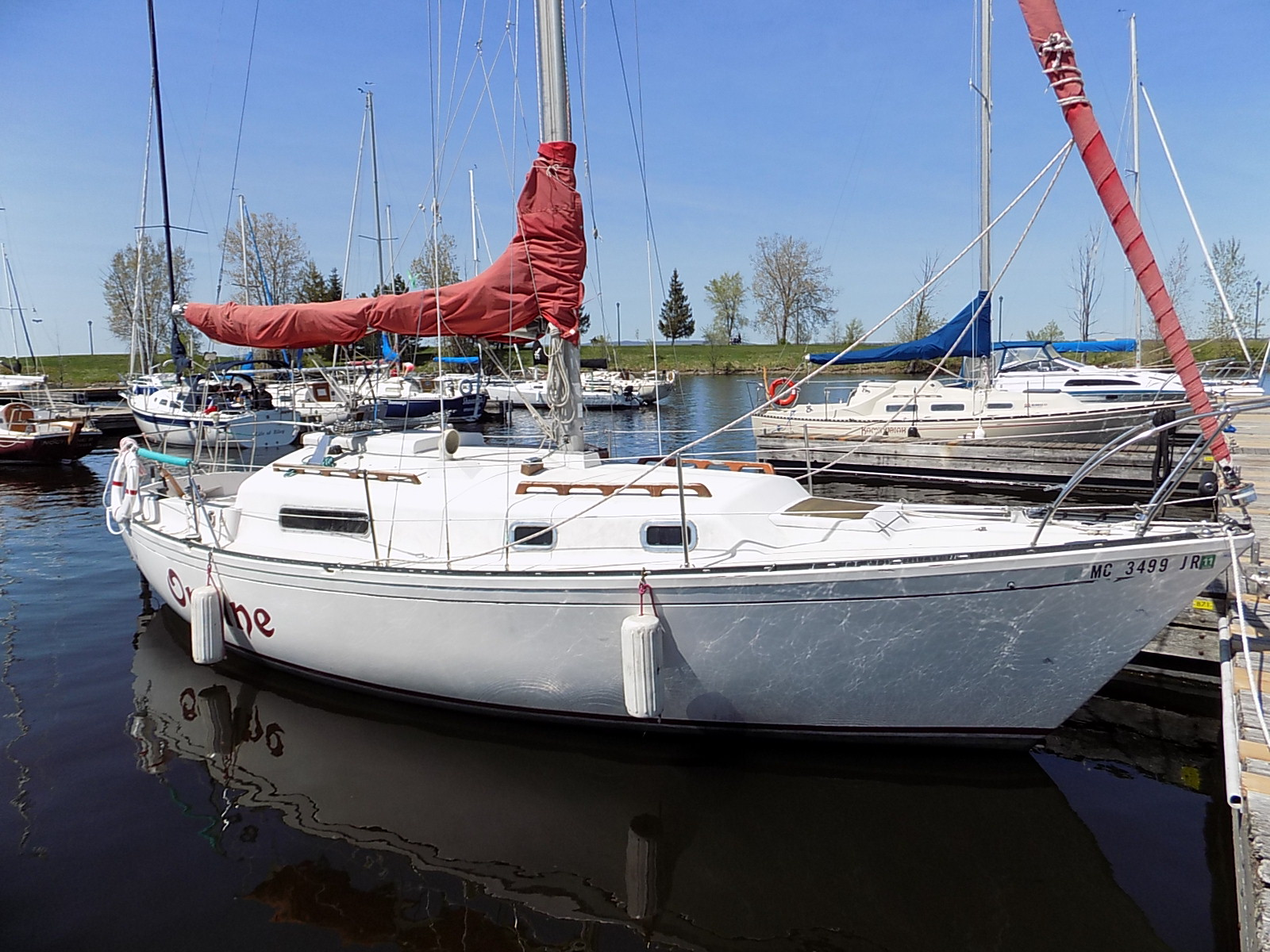
Aloha 28

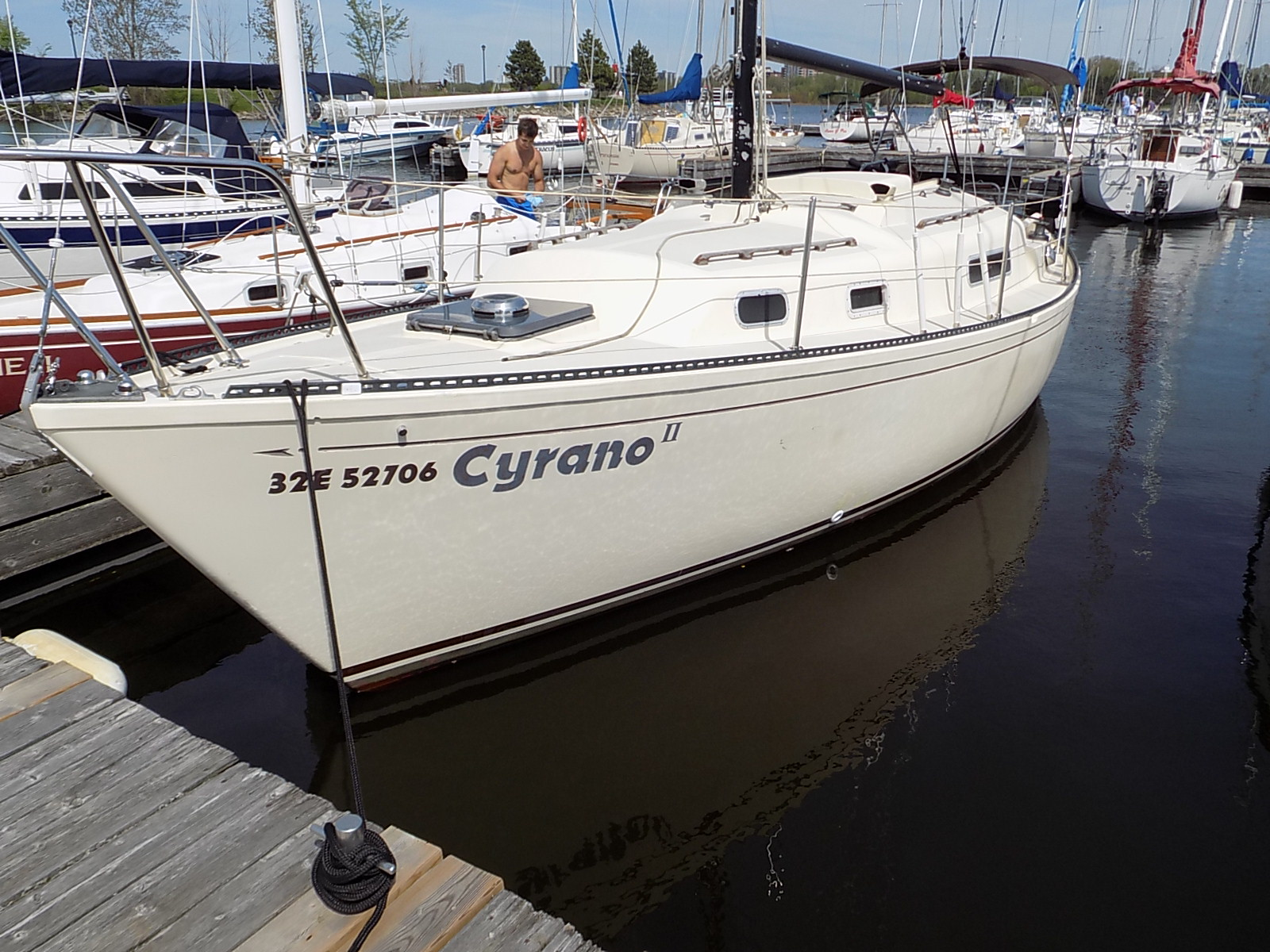
Aloha 28

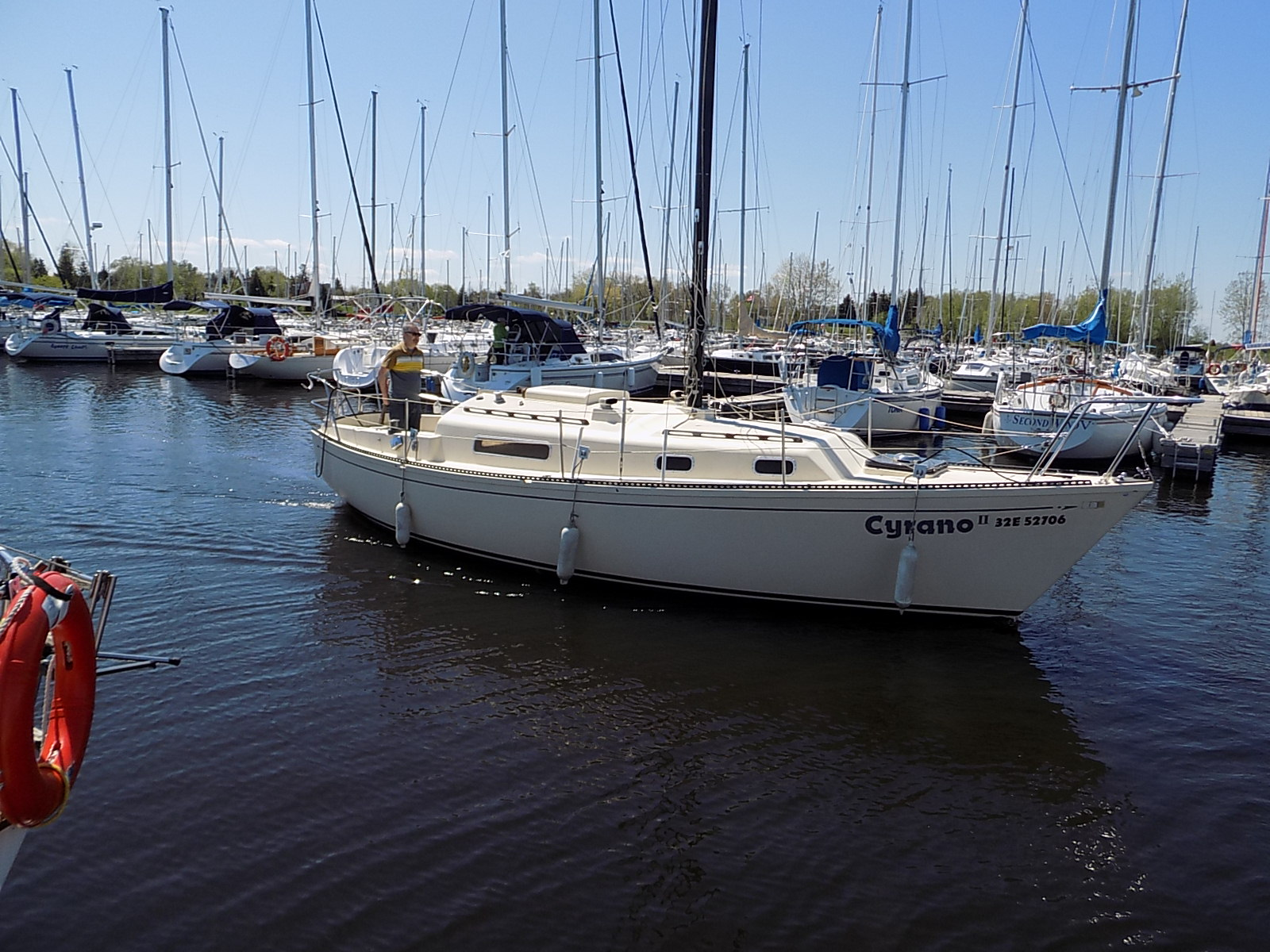
Aloha 28

The Aloha 28 is built predominantly of fiberglass, with wood trim. It has a masthead sloop rig, a raked stem, a vertical transom, a transom-hung rudder mounted on a skeg and a fixed swept fin keel. It displaces 6,750 lb (3,062 kg) and carries 3,000 lb (1,361 kg) of ballast.

The boat has a draft of 4.33 ft (1.32 m) with the standard keel fitted.

Several masts and rigs were supplied during the course of production, including a tall masted version, with a mast about 1.6 ft (0.49 m) taller than standard.

With the tall mast fitted the design has a PHRF racing average handicap of 195 with a high of 202 and low of 192. It has a hull speed of 6.63 kn (12.28 km/h).

== Reception ==
In a review Michael McGoldrick wrote, "The Aloha 28 was designed by Ted Brewer, a Canadian who has gained a considerable reputation for drawing some serious cruising boats. The Aloha 28 certainly qualifies on this count. Although Aloha wasn't designed for racing, a long waterline makes it a fast boat. It also had a long production run, stretching from the early 1970s to the mid 1980s ... In its final years of production, this boat was also marketed as the Aloha 8.5. The Aloha 8.5 had a different window configuration and a better forward hatch."
