= Aloha 30 =

Sailboat class

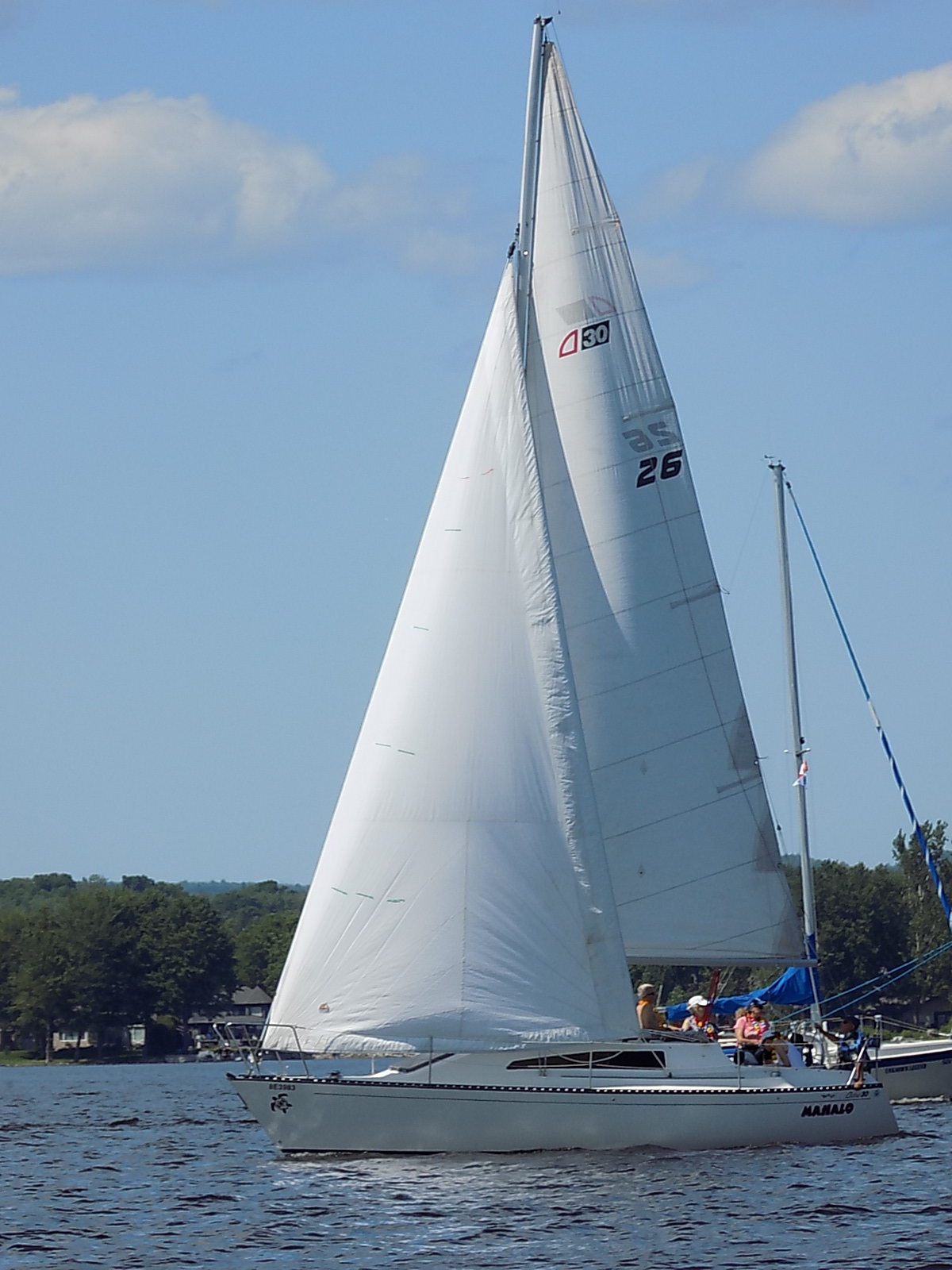

Development
- Designer: Ron Holland
- Location: Canada
- Year: 1986
- Builder: Ouyang Boat Works
- Name: Aloha 30

Boat
- Displacement: 6,800 lb (3,084 kg)
- Draft: 5.75 ft (1.75 m)

Hull
- Type: Monohull
- Construction: Fiberglass
- LOA: 30.00 ft (9.14 m)
- LWL: 26.00 ft (7.92 m)
- Beam: 10.00 ft (3.05 m)
- Engine: Westerbeke or Volvo diesel engine

Hull appendages
- Keel: fin keel
- Ballast: 2,960 lb (1,343 kg)
- Rudder: internally-mounted spade-type rudder

Rig
- General: Fractional rigged sloop
- I foretriangle height: 35.00 ft (10.67 m)
- J foretriangle base: 10.60 ft (3.23 m)
- P mainsail luff: 37.50 ft (11.43 m)
- E mainsail foot: 13.50 ft (4.11 m)

Sails
- Mainsail area: 253.13 sq ft (23.517 m^{2})
- Jib/genoa area: 185.50 sq ft (17.234 m^{2})
- Total sail area: 438.63 sq ft (40.750 m^{2})

Racing
- PHRF: 147 (average)

The Aloha 30 is a Canadian sailboat, that was designed by Ron Holland and first built in 1986.

== Production ==
The boat was built by Ouyang Boat Works under the Aloha Yachts brand in Canada between 1986 and 1989, but it is now out of production.

== Design ==
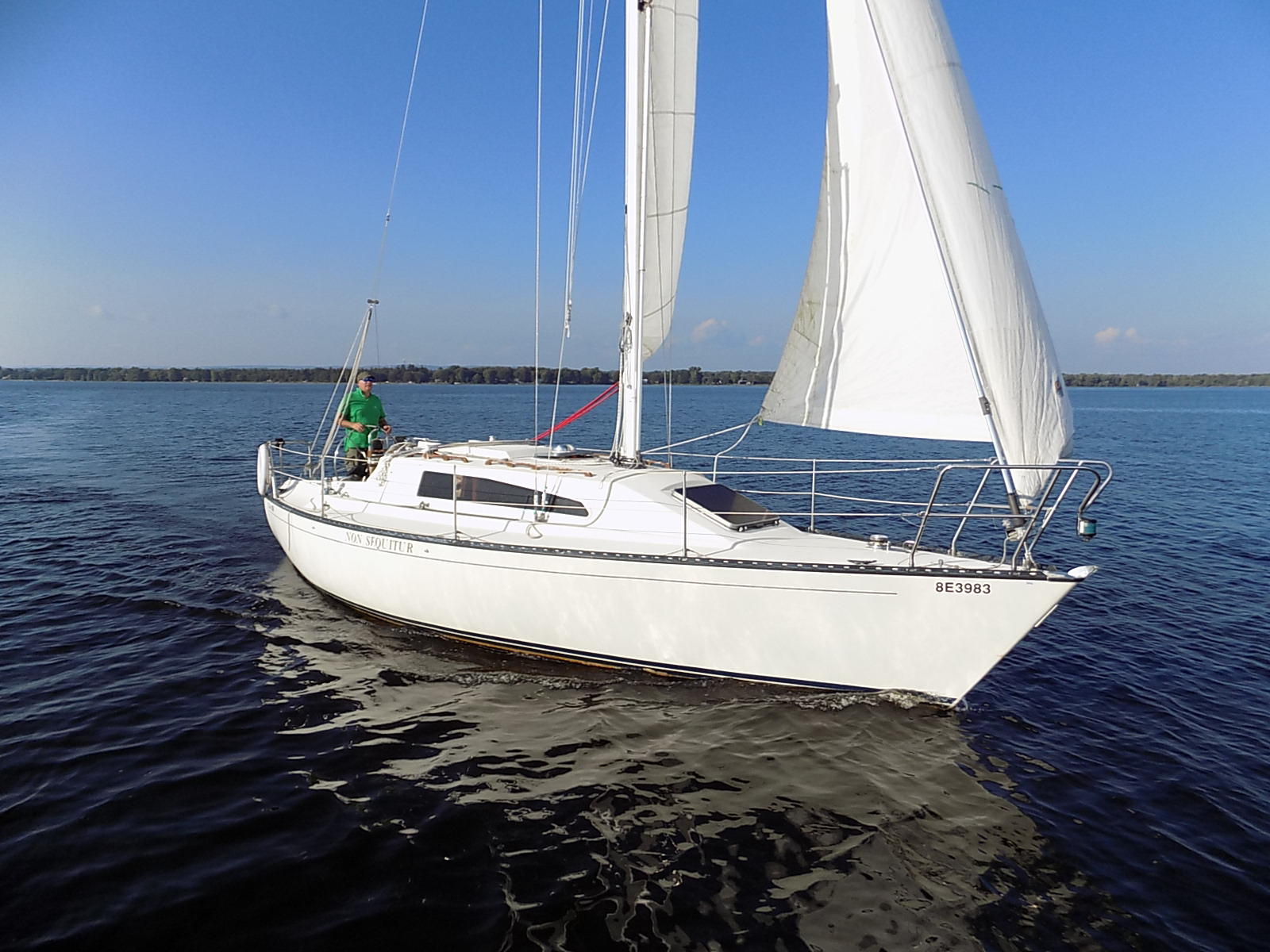
Aloha 30

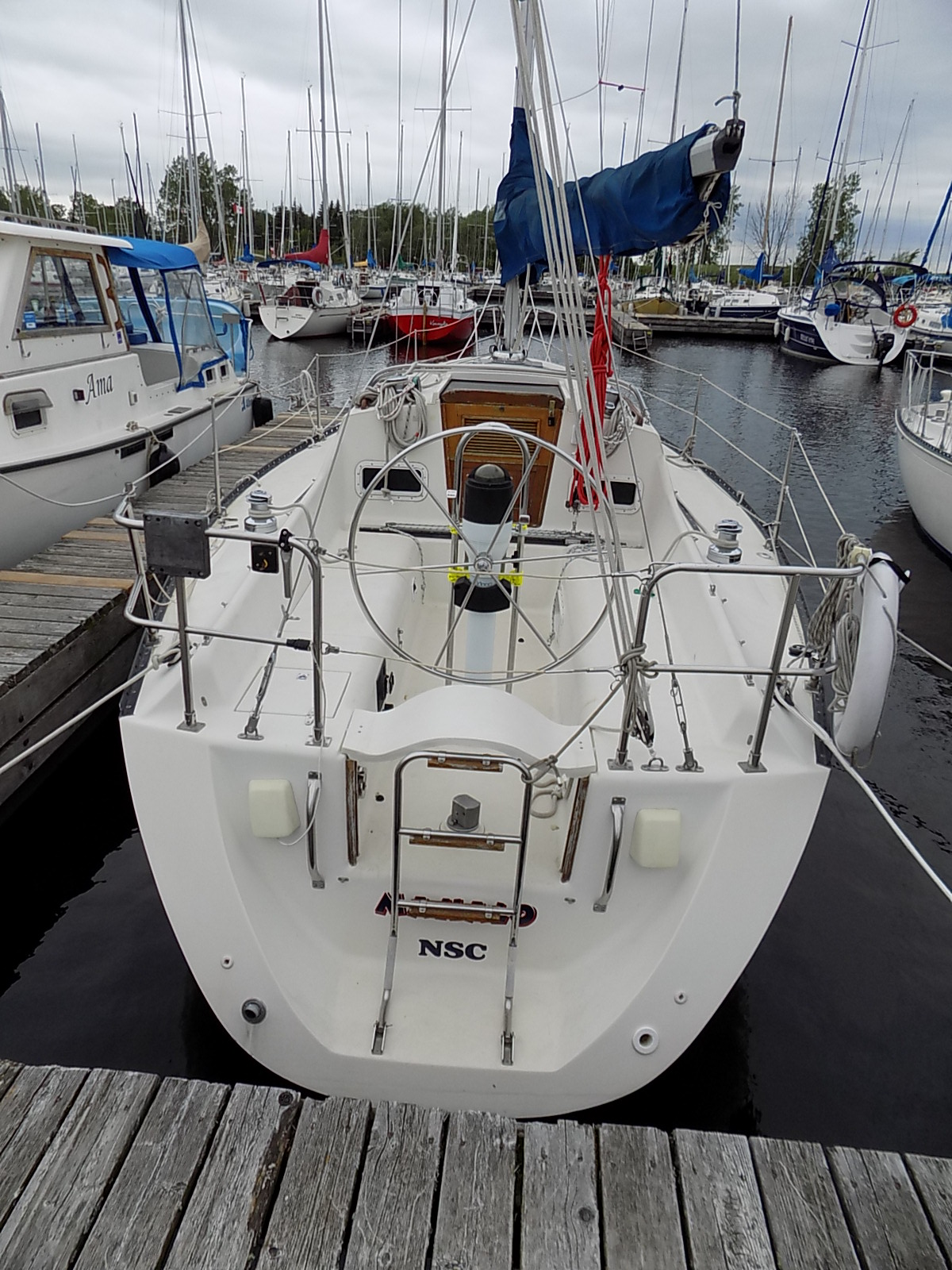
Aloha 30 showing walk-through transom

The Aloha 30 is a small recreational keelboat, built predominantly of fiberglass, with wood trim. It has a fractional sloop rig, a/an internally-mounted spade-type rudder and a fixed fin keel. It displaces 6,800 lb (3,084 kg) and carries 2,960 lb (1,343 kg) of ballast.

The boat has a draft of 5.75 ft (1.75 m) with the standard keel and 4.5 ft (1.4 m) with the optional shoal draft keel.

The boat is fitted with a Westerbeke or Volvo diesel engine. The fuel tank holds 12 U.S. gallons (45 L; 10.0 imp gal) and the fresh water tank has a capacity of 30 U.S. gallons (110 L; 25 imp gal).

The boat has a PHRF racing average handicap of 147 with a high of 156 and low of 141. It has a hull speed of 6.83 kn (12.65 km/h).

== Operational history ==
In a review Michael McGoldrick wrote, "The Aloha 30 is a good example of the new breed of boat which started to emerge from the Canadian sailboat industry in the latter half of the 1980s. These boats were heavily influenced by the French designs which quickly became popular in North America, and they tend to include the mandatory aft cabin. The Aloha 30 was designed by Ron Holland, who became known for coming up with very fast boats, and this 30 footer was a bit of a departure for a manufacturer usually identified with building solid cruising boats. The Aloha 30 has a factional rig, a feature that makes it easier to control the shape of the rather large mainsail. It also has a deep elliptical shaped fin keel, which was all the rage for fast designs in the late 1980s and early 1990s."

== See also ==
- List of sailing boat types
