= BMW Marine =

Marine engine division of BMW group

BMW Marine GmbH was BMW's marine engine division. BMW's interest in marine engines dated back to 1913; they began making marine engines in 1919 after World War I.

== Diesel engines ==
Engines came from VM Motori in Northern Italy, such engines were also used in the Maybach MD870 diesel engine.
