= UFO 34 =

Class of fibreglass sailboat

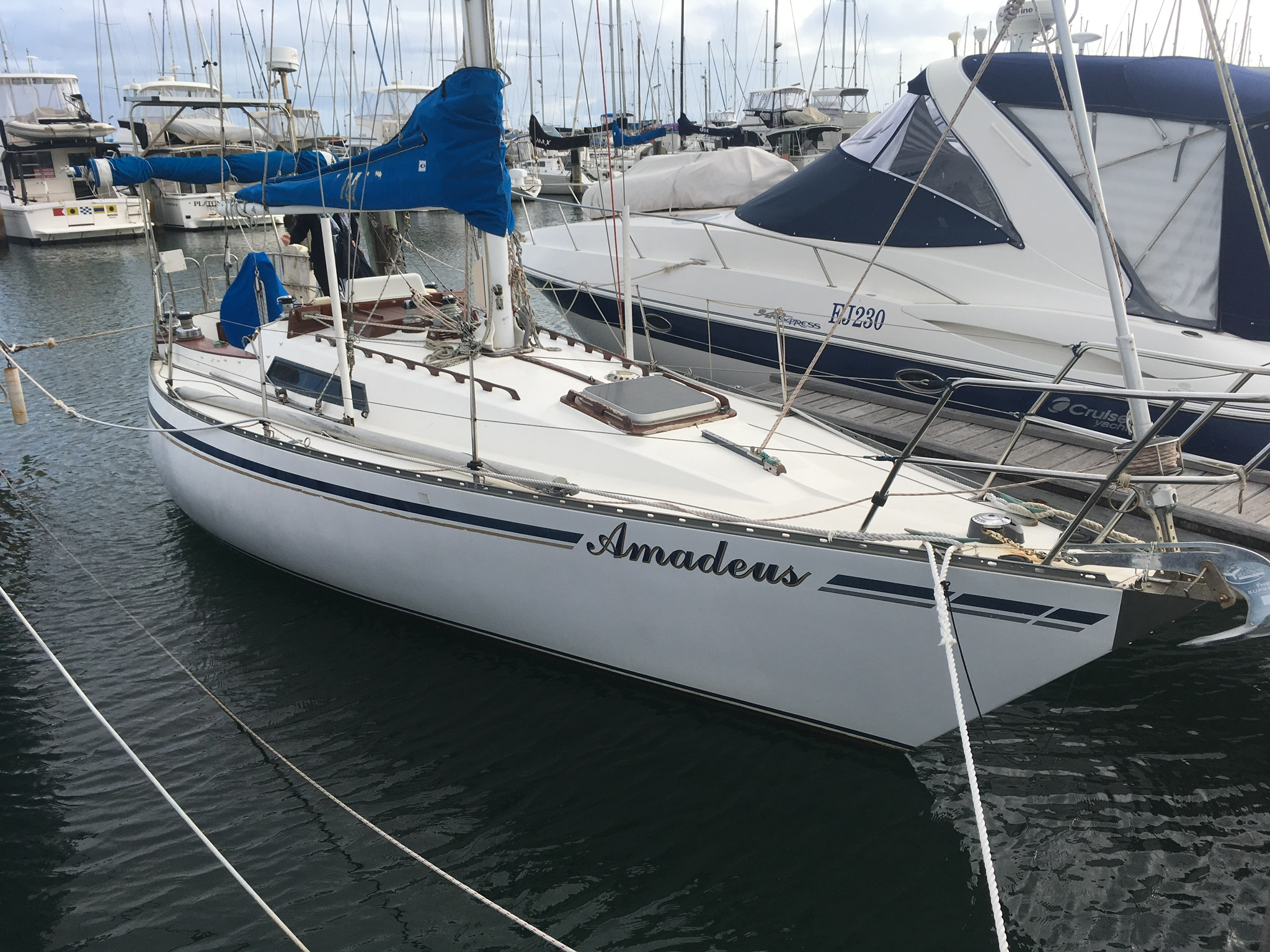
- A UFO 34 built in West Australia

Development
- Designer: Holman & Pye
- Year: 1973
- Name: UFO 34

Boat
- Crew: 1 to 6
- Draft: 1.86 metres (6 ft 1 in)

Hull
- Type: Monohull keelboat
- Construction: Fibreglass
- LOA: 10.54 metres (34.6 ft)
- LWL: 8.56 metres (28.1 ft)
- Beam: 3.35 metres (11.0 ft)

Sails
- Total sail area: 47.47 metres (155.7 ft)

UFO 34 is a cruising and racing fibreglass monohull sailboat class. It is a sloop based on a design by Kim Holman. The design features a spade rudder and a Bermuda rig with a large, overlapping headsail. Over 150 UFO 34s have been built both in the United Kingdom and Australia.

The UFO 34 is a seaworthy yacht for offshore voyages, including extreme weather conditions, which also performs well in yacht racing. UFO 34 yachts competed both in the disastrous 1979 Fastnet and 1998 Sydney to Hobart yacht races, where lives and yachts were lost in the extreme conditions. UFO 34s performed effectively in both races, winning class IV in the Fastnet race and retiring without incident in the Sydney to Hobart.

== Production history ==
Unidentified Flying Object won the Royal Yacht Squadron's de Maas Cup at Cowes in 1974 and many other races. This first yacht was designed for Richard Matthews by the British naval architects Holman and Pye as a 32 ft prototype for the Three-Quarter Ton class in the International Offshore Rule. The design was developed into the UFO 34, which became the first yacht produced by Matthew's company Oyster Marine. Over 150 were built, both in the United Kingdom and Australia.

In the United Kingdom builders included Colvic Craft (hull & deck), Landamores Yacht Builders (fitout) plus a number were completed by owners. A mark II version was also released by Oyster Marine incorporating an external ballast keel with either a racing/cruising keel (5,000 lbs) or a racing keel (6,000 lbs).

In Western Australia builders included Durben Marine, AYC Yacht Construction and Sea Craft Marine.

== Racing achievements ==
UFO 34s are raced at club level both in the United Kingdom and Australia. By modern standards a UFO 34 is a moderate to heavy yacht with good performance, particularly to windward. Racing performance is similar to S&S 34s with both rated the same and slightly faster than a Contessa 32. UFO 34s also regularly compete in offshore races in Western Australia.

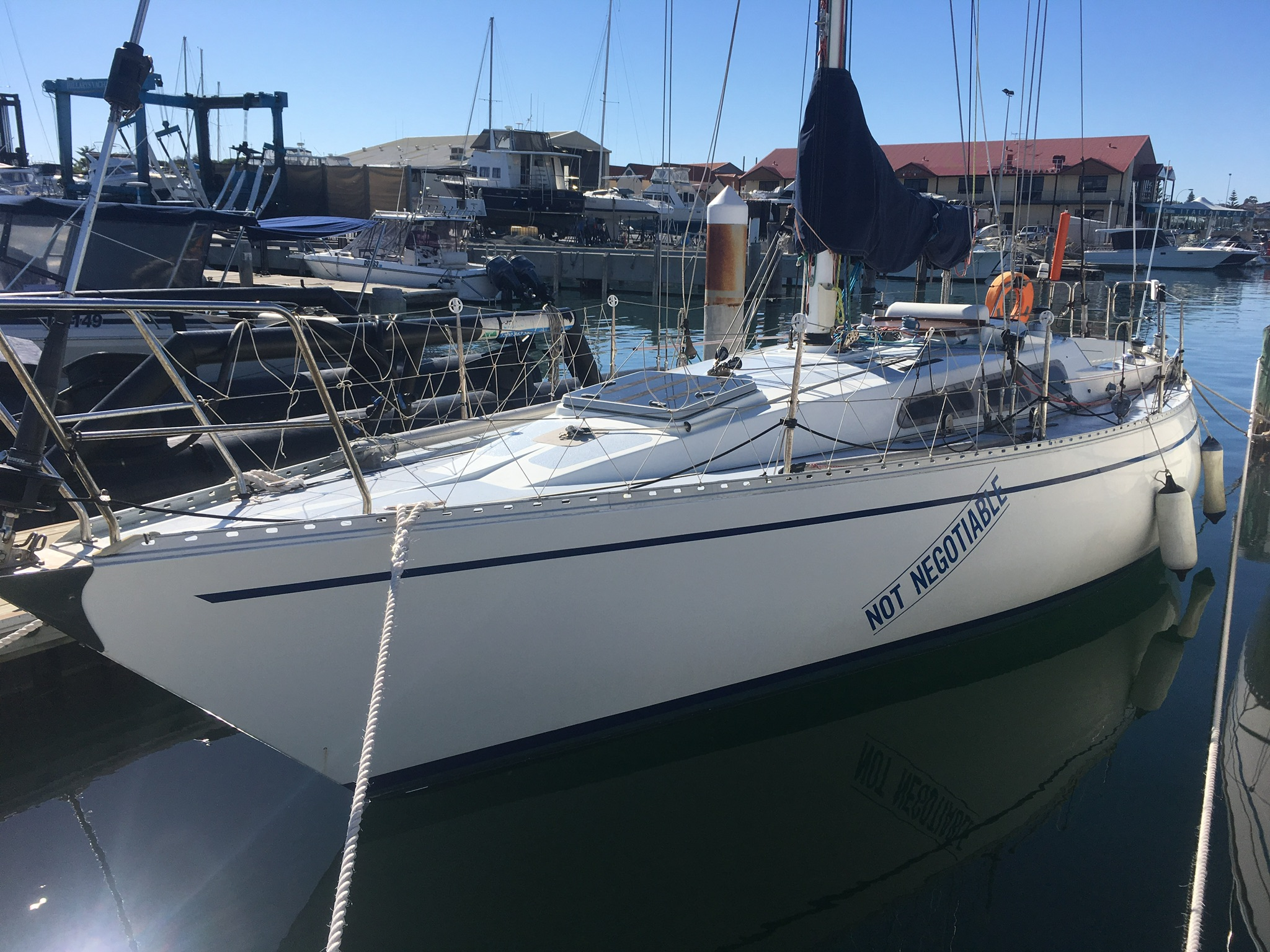
'Not Negotiable' a UFO 34 that successfully competed in many ocean races in Australia

A UFO 34 based in Australia called Not Negotiable had a number of good results in offshore racing, including 2000 Melbourne–King Island. PHD (1st overall) & IMS (2nd overall), 2001 Melbourne–Low Head (Tasmania) 2nd PHD overall, the 1998, 1999 & 2000 Sydney to Hobart Yacht Races, the 2004 Australian Three Peaks Race the 2009 Launceston to Hobart and more recently the 2013 Fremantle to Bali yacht race. The UFO 34 Impulse also won her division in the 1999 Sydney to Hobart yacht race. UFO 34s also had good results in the 1993 Fremantle to Lombok (Indonesia) yacht race with Amadeus winning IMS honours (1st overall) and Vela taking out the YAH trophy (1st overall).

As detailed below, the UFO 34s Black Arrow finished 1st and Mahuri 3rd in class IV of the 1979 Fastnet race.

== Notable voyages ==
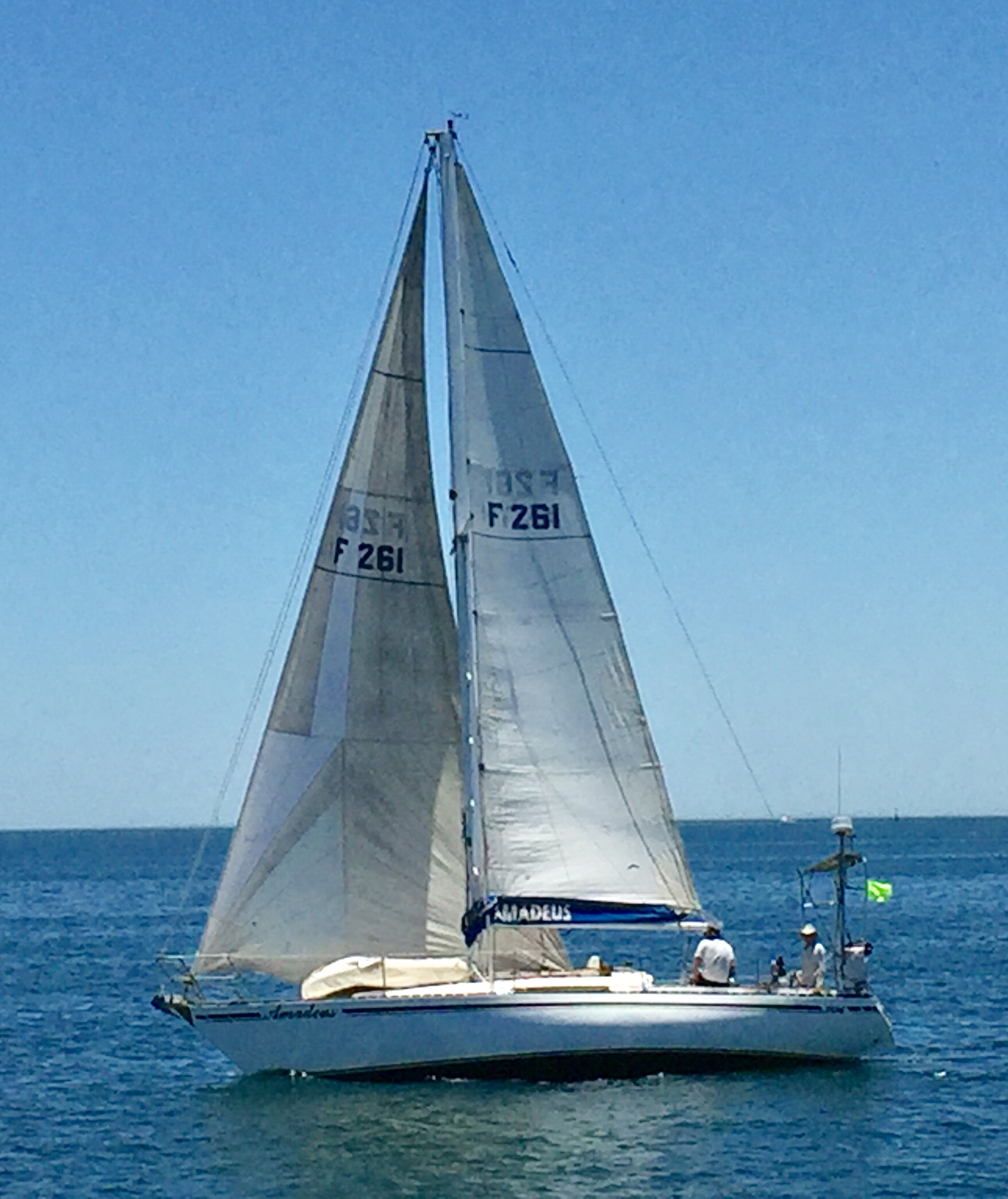
A UFO 34 yacht sailing

A proven cruising yacht that has extensively sailed around Great Britain, the Baltic and North Sea and Mediterranean. UFO 34 yachts have also participated in the 630 nautical mile Sydney to Hobart Yacht Race and the 1,460 nautical mile Fremantle-to-Lombok Yacht Race.

In May 1979 the UFO 34 Windrift of Clyde sailed from Scotland to Iceland and encountered severe weather conditions, estimated at a sustained 60 knots plus for over 24 hours. During this period the yacht suffered severe knockdowns and capsized twice, including being pitch-poled. Despite some damage and injuries to crew, the yacht was able to sail to Iceland without assistance. A very good summary of the voyage is detailed in the fifth edition of Adlard Coles' Heavy Weather Sailing.

== Seaworthiness ==
UFO 34s are seaworthy yachts that have few vices and make a good all-round fast cruiser/racers. The UFO 34's stability index has been calculated at 122.4 with a Limit of positive stability of 119.1, which is above the minimum stability index of 115 required for the Sydney to Hobart Yacht Race.

Six UFO 34s competed in the 1979 Fastnet race, which experienced winds averaging 50 to 55 knots, gusts to 68 knots and waves as high as 50 feet. None of them sustained significant structural damage to the hull. Among the 58 boats in Class IV (34 ft), two of the six finishing yachts were UFO 34s: Black Arrow finishing 1st and Mahuri 3rd. Three of the other UFO 34s retired without major incidents. Apart from two knockdowns Kamisado coped effectively with the storm and retired to Plymouth. The only UFO 34 that had significant issues was Sandettie, which was rolled, dismasted and swamped. However Sandettie's crew were able to jury rig emergency rigging and sail to Lands End, where they were towed to Penzance.

During the 1998 Sydney to Hobart Yacht Race the UFO 34 Not Negotiable experienced winds in excess of 65 knots (33 m/s, 118 km/h, 73 mph, Force 12) for approximately 6–8 hours. During this period breaking waves of 4–8 metres, with the occasional 12 metre wave were also encountered. Apart from one knockdown to 80 degrees, Not Negotiable had no issues and safely retired to Eden. The main technique utilised was to "...keeping our nose into it and ploughing forward and just ducking and weaving around the worst of the waves worked for us fine". Note that this is similar to the successful storm tactics employed by the UFO 34 Windrift of Clyde when the yacht was actively sailed with the bow into the sea.

== See also ==
- List of sailing boat types

Similar sailboats

- Catalina 34
- Contessa 32
- CS 34
- Express 34
- Hunter 34
- S&S 34
- Sea Sprite 34
- Tartan 34 C
- Tartan 34-2
- Viking 34
