= Tartan 34 C =

Sailboat class

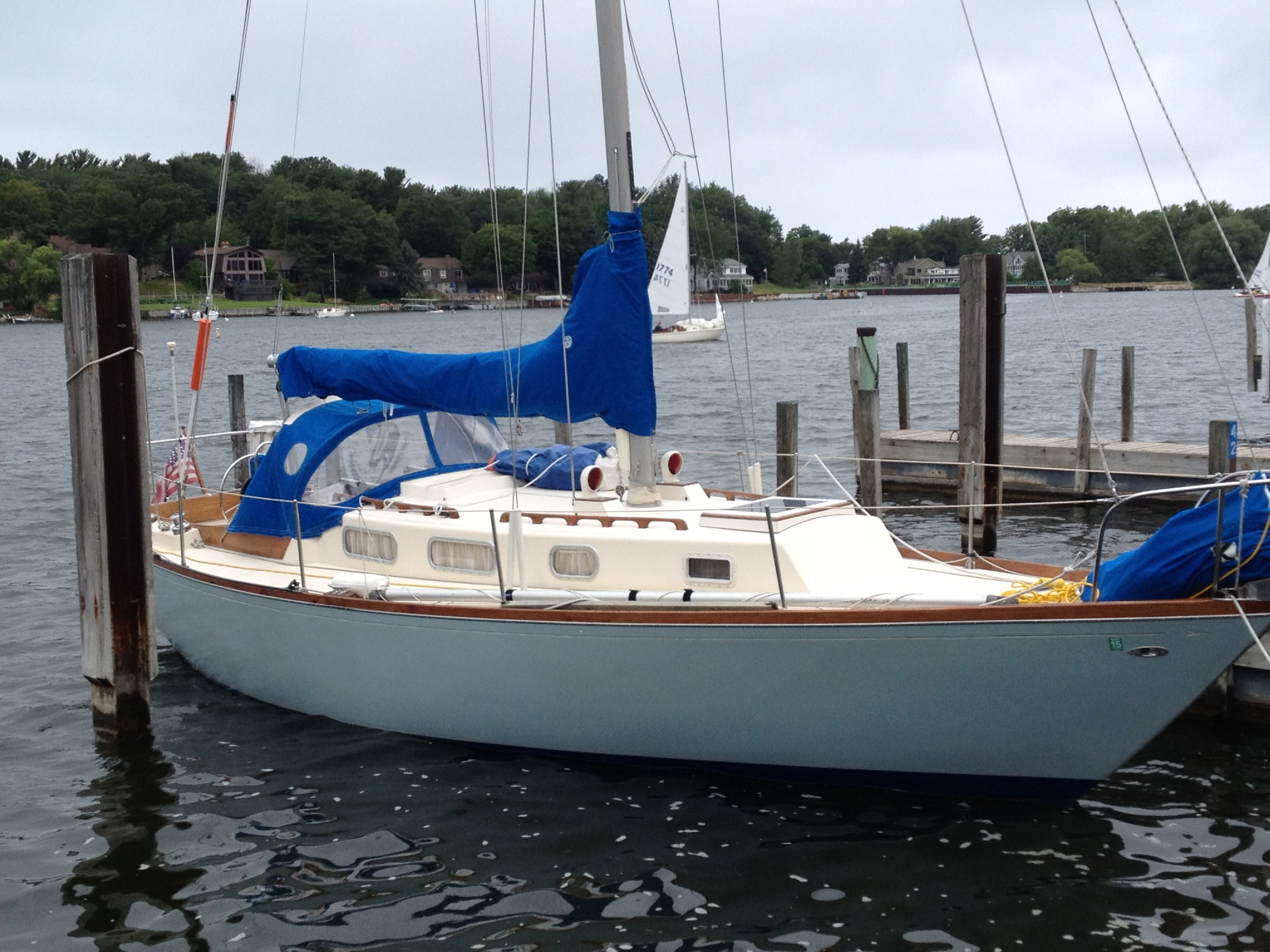

Development
- Designer: Sparkman & Stephens
- Location: United States
- Year: 1968
- Builder: Tartan Marine
- Name: Tartan 34 C

Boat
- Displacement: 11,200 lb (5,080 kg)
- Draft: 8.33 ft (2.54 m) with the centerboard down

Hull
- Type: Monohull
- Construction: Fiberglass
- LOA: 34.42 ft (10.49 m)
- LWL: 25.00 ft (7.62 m)
- Beam: 10.17 ft (3.10 m)
- Engine: Universal Atomic 4 30 hp (22 kW) gasoline engine

Hull appendages
- Keel: fin keel
- Ballast: 5,000 lb (2,268 kg)
- Rudder: skeg-mounted rudder

Rig
- General: Masthead sloop
- I foretriangle height: 41.00 ft (12.50 m)
- J foretriangle base: 14.00 ft (4.27 m)
- P mainsail luff: 35.50 ft (10.82 m)
- E mainsail foot: 13.50 ft (4.11 m)

Sails
- Mainsail area: 239.63 sq ft (22.262 m^{2})
- Jib/genoa area: 287.00 sq ft (26.663 m^{2})
- Total sail area: 526.63 sq ft (48.926 m^{2})

The Tartan 34 C is an American sailboat that was designed by Sparkman & Stephens and first built in 1968. The boat is Sparkman & Stephens Design Number 1904.

The Tartan 34 C was initially marketed as the Tartan 34. When a later, unrelated design was introduced in 1984, it was also marketed as the Tartan 34. To differentiate the two designs the older one is commonly called the Tartan 34 C, with the "C" indicating Classic. The latter Tartan 34 became commonly known as the Tartan 34-2.

== Production ==
The Tartan 34 C was built by Tartan Marine in the United States between 1968 and 1978, with 525 examples completed, but it is now out of production.

== Design ==
The Tartan 34 C is a small recreational keelboat, built predominantly of fiberglass, with wood trim. It has a masthead sloop rig, a skeg-mounted rudder and a fixed stub keel, with a retractable centerboard. It displaces 11,200 lb (5,080 kg) and carries 5,000 lb (2,268 kg) of lead ballast. The boat has a draft of 8.33 ft (2.54 m) with the centerboard extended and 3.92 ft (1.19 m) with it retracted.

The design had a factory option of a pilot berth in place of the port storage cabinet, over and outboard of the dinette, but few boats were so equipped. A yawl rig, with a mizzen mast, was also a factory option.

The mainsail foot dimension (parameter "E") was reduced at least twice during the boat's production run, increasing the aspect ratio of the mainsail to improve sail balance and to lower the design's International Offshore Rule handicap rating. Hull serial numbers 125 to 200 have an "E" of 12.0 ft (3.7 m), while hull serial numbers 200 and later have an "E" of 10.5 ft (3.2 m).

The boat is fitted with a Universal Atomic 4 gasoline engine of 30 hp (22 kW). The fuel tank holds 26 U.S. gallons (98 L; 22 imp gal) and the fresh water tank has a capacity of 36 U.S. gallons (140 L; 30 imp gal).

The boat has a hull speed of 6.7 kn (12.41 km/h).

== See also ==
- List of sailing boat types

Similar sailboats

- Beneteau 331
- Beneteau First Class 10
- C&C 34
- C&C 34/36
- Catalina 34
- Coast 34
- Columbia 34
- Columbia 34 Mark II
- Creekmore 34
- Crown 34
- CS 34
- Hunter 34
- San Juan 34
- Sea Sprite 34
- S&S 34
- Sun Odyssey 349
- UFO 34 (yacht)
- Viking 34
