= Columbia 34 Mark II =

Sailboat class

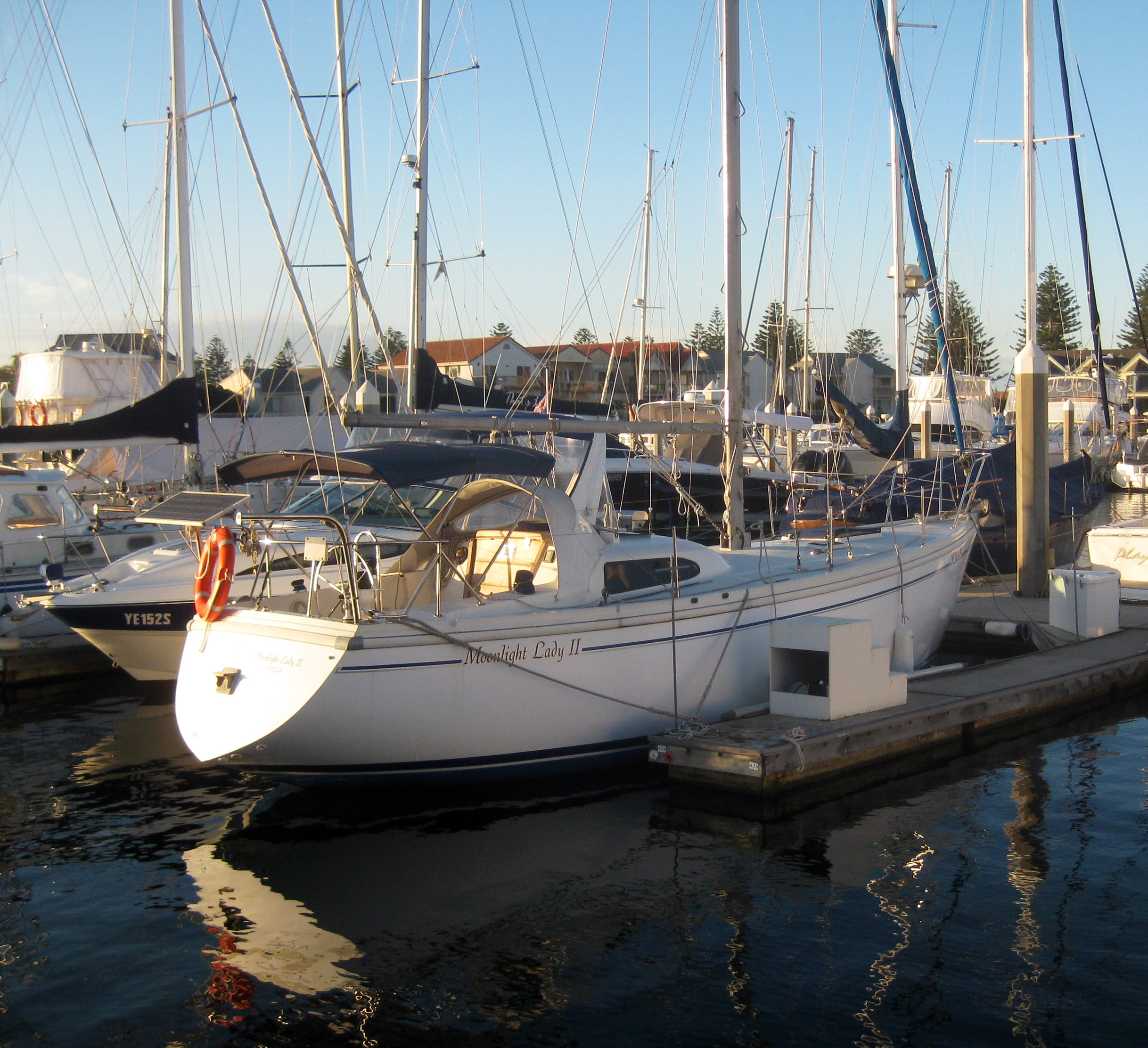

Development
- Designer: William Tripp Jr.
- Location: United States
- Year: 1970
- No. built: 352
- Builder: Columbia Yachts
- Name: Columbia 34 Mark II

Boat
- Displacement: 12,000 lb (5,443 kg)
- Draft: 5.50 ft (1.68 m)

Hull
- Type: Monohull
- Construction: Fiberglass
- LOA: 33.58 ft (10.24 m)
- LWL: 27.33 ft (8.33 m)
- Beam: 10.00 ft (3.05 m)
- Engine: Palmer P-60 4-107 Yanmar 27 hp (20 kW) gasoline engine

Hull appendages
- Keel: fin keel
- Ballast: 4,700 lb (2,132 kg)
- Rudder: internally-mounted spade-type rudder

Rig
- Rig type: Bermuda rig
- I foretriangle height: 42.00 ft (12.80 m)
- J foretriangle base: 13.80 ft (4.21 m)
- P mainsail luff: 36.30 ft (11.06 m)
- E mainsail foot: 13.00 ft (3.96 m)

Sails
- Sailplan: Masthead sloop
- Mainsail area: 235.95 sq ft (21.920 m^{2})
- Jib/genoa area: 289.80 sq ft (26.923 m^{2})
- Total sail area: 525.75 sq ft (48.844 m^{2})

The Columbia 34 Mark II is an American sailboat that was designed by William H. Tripp Jr. as a coastal cruising sailboat and first built in 1970.

The Columbia 34 Mark II's hull molds were later used to develop the Coronado 35 and also the Hughes 36 and the Hughes-Columbia 36.

== Production ==
The Columbia 34 Mark II was a new design built by Columbia Yachts in the United States as a follow-on to the unrelated Columbia 34. The company produced 352 examples of the Mark II between 1970 and 1975, but it is now out of production.

== Design ==
The Columbia 34 Mark II is a recreational keelboat, built predominantly of fiberglass, with wood trim. It has a masthead sloop rig, a spooned raked stem, a reverse transom, an internally mounted spade-type rudder controlled by a tiller or optional wheel and a fixed fin keel, or optional shoal draft keel or stub keel with a centerboard.

Accommodation includes a bow "V"-berth, a main cabin dinette table that drops to form a double berth, a main cabin settee for a single berth, a quarter berth opposite the galley. The galley includes a stainless steel sink, four teak drawers, a gimballed two-burner alcohol-fired stove, a top-loading icebox. Refrigeration and pressurized hot and cold water were factory options. There is a main cabin navigation table that slides out of the way when not in use. Engine access requires removing the companionway steps. An anchor locker is fitted in the bow.

== Variants ==
Columbia 34 Mark II
This model was introduced in 1970 and produced until 1975. It displaces 12,000 lb (5,443 kg) and carries 4,700 lb (2,132 kg) of iron ballast. The boat has a draft of 5.50 ft (1.68 m) with the standard keel fitted. The boat has a Palmer P-60 gasoline engine of 27 hp (20 kW) or optional Albin diesel engine, driving a two-bladed propeller. The fuel tank holds 30 U.S. gallons (110 L; 25 imp gal) and the fresh water tank has a capacity of 40 U.S. gallons (150 L; 33 imp gal).
Columbia 34 Mark II CB
This model features a short keel and centerboard. It was introduced in 1970 and produced until 1975. It displaces 13,000 lb (5,897 kg) and carries 5,700 lb (2,585 kg) of lead ballast. The boat has a draft of 3.75 ft (1.14 m) with the centeroard up and 7.92 ft (2.41 m) with it down. The boat is fitted with a Universal Atomic 4 diesel engine. The fuel tank holds 30 U.S. gallons (110 L; 25 imp gal) and the fresh water tank has a capacity of 40 U.S. gallons (150 L; 33 imp gal).
Columbia 34 Mark II SD
This shoal draft keel model was introduced in 1970 and eventually replaced the Mark II CB in production. It has the same short keel as the "CB", but lacks the retractable centerboard. It displaces 13,000 lb (5,897 kg) and carries 5,700 lb (2,585 kg) of ballast. The boat has a draft of 3.75 ft (1.14 m) with the standard shoal draft keel fitted. The boat has a Universal Atomic 4 diesel engine.

== Operational history ==
A review by Dave Smith notes, "When the ... Columbia 34 MKII first came out it ... it was billed as "The Seven Sleeper for Seven Footers", and "The room of a 38 footer for the price you would expect in a 32 footer". Both slogans capture the allure of the MKII Columbia 34." He notes, " The boat does not have a generous sail plan (about the same sail area as a Columbia 30), so it doesn’t perform well in light air. With the high freeboard, it isn’t as good up wind as some other designs, and it likes to be reefed early when going to windward. A cute little characteristic of the 34 is that the galley and head sinks slip below the waterline when the boat is heeled beyond 15 degrees, so you learn to close these through hull fittings before sailing or risk letting in a lot of water."

== See also ==
- List of sailing boat types

Related development

- Coronado 35
- Hughes 36
- Hughes-Columbia 36

Similar sailboats

- Beneteau 331
- Beneteau First Class 10
- C&C 34
- C&C 34/36
- Catalina 34
- Coast 34
- Creekmore 34
- Crown 34
- CS 34
- Express 34
- Hunter 34
- San Juan 34
- Sea Sprite 34
- Sun Odyssey 349
- Tartan 34 C
- Tartan 34-2
- Viking 34
