= Tartan 34-2 =

Sailboat class

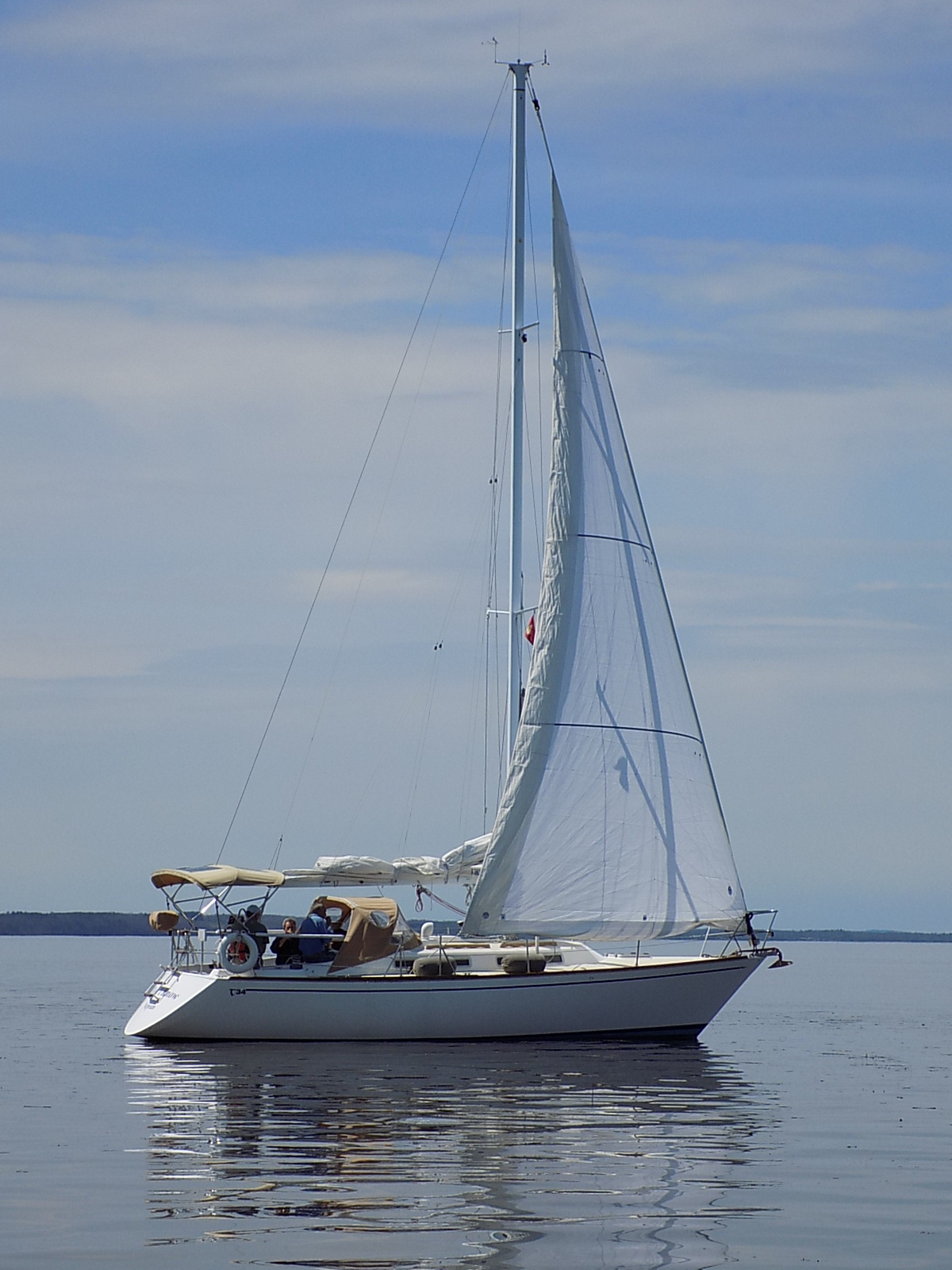

Development
- Designer: Sparkman & Stephens
- Location: United States
- Year: 1984
- Builder: Tartan Marine
- Name: Tartan 34-2

Boat
- Displacement: 11,000 lb (4,990 kg)
- Draft: 6.25 ft (1.91 m)

Hull
- Type: Monohull
- Construction: Fiberglass
- LOA: 34.42 ft (10.49 m)
- LWL: 28.83 ft (8.79 m)
- Beam: 10.96 ft (3.34 m)
- Engine: Yanmar 27 hp (20 kW) diesel engine

Hull appendages
- Keel: fin keel
- Ballast: 4,400 lb (1,996 kg)
- Rudder: internally-mounted spade-type rudder

Rig
- General: Masthead sloop
- I foretriangle height: 44.80 ft (13.66 m)
- J foretriangle base: 13.60 ft (4.15 m)
- P mainsail luff: 39.20 ft (11.95 m)
- E mainsail foot: 11.90 ft (3.63 m)

Sails
- Mainsail area: 233.24 sq ft (21.669 m^{2})
- Jib/genoa area: 304.64 sq ft (28.302 m^{2})
- Total sail area: 537.88 sq ft (49.971 m^{2})

Racing
- PHRF: 177 (average)

The Tartan 34-2 is an American sailboat that was designed by Sparkman & Stephens and first built by Tartan Marine of Painesville, Ohio, in 1984.

The Tartan 34-2 is a development of the 1979 Sparkman & Stephens-designed Tartan 33 R, with the stern extended and a different interior layout. It is unrelated to the 1968 Sparkman & Stephens-designed Tartan 34 C. Both the 34-2 and the earlier 34 C were marketed simply as the "Tartan 34", but to avoid confusion they are commonly referred to as the 34 C ("Classic") and the 34-2 to differentiate the designs.

== Production ==
The Tartan 34-2 was built by Tartan Marine in the United States between 1984 and 1989, with 110 examples completed.

== Design ==
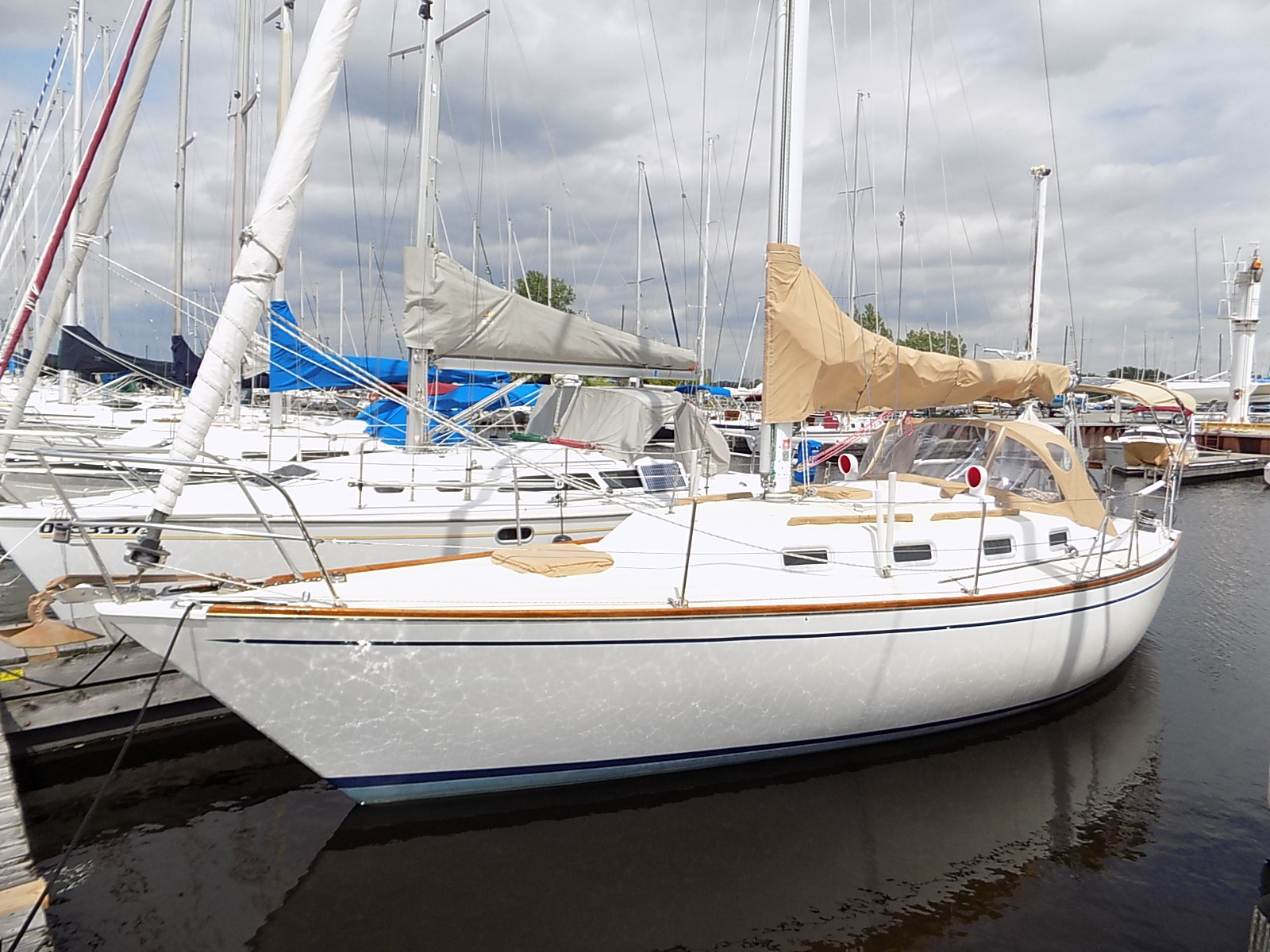
Tartan 34-2

The Tartan 34-2 is a 34 ft (10 m) loa recreational keelboat, built predominantly of fiberglass, with wood trim. It has a masthead sloop rig, an internally-mounted spade-type rudder, a reverse transom and a fixed fin keel. It displaces 11,000 lb (4,990 kg) and carries 4,400 lb (1,996 kg) of ballast.

The boat has a draft of 6.25 ft (1.91 m) with the standard keel and 4.46 ft (1.36 m) with the optional shoal draft keel.

The design was factory-fitted with a Japanese Yanmar diesel engine of 27 hp (20 kW). The fuel tank holds 23 U.S. gallons (87 L; 19 imp gal) and the fresh water tank has a capacity of 57 U.S. gallons (220 L; 47 imp gal).

The boat has a PHRF racing average handicap of 177 with a high of 186 and low of 174. The shoal draft version has an average PHRF handicap of 141 with a high of 147 and low of 135. Both versions have a hull speed of 7.19 kn (13.32 km/h).

== See also ==
- List of sailing boat types

Similar sailboats

- Beneteau 331
- Beneteau First Class 10
- C&C 34
- C&C 34/36
- Catalina 34
- Coast 34
- Columbia 34
- Columbia 34 Mark II
- Creekmore 34
- Crown 34
- CS 34
- Express 34
- Hunter 34
- San Juan 34
- S&S 34
- Sea Sprite 34
- Sun Odyssey 349
- UFO 34
- Viking 34
