= Viking 34 =

Sailboat class

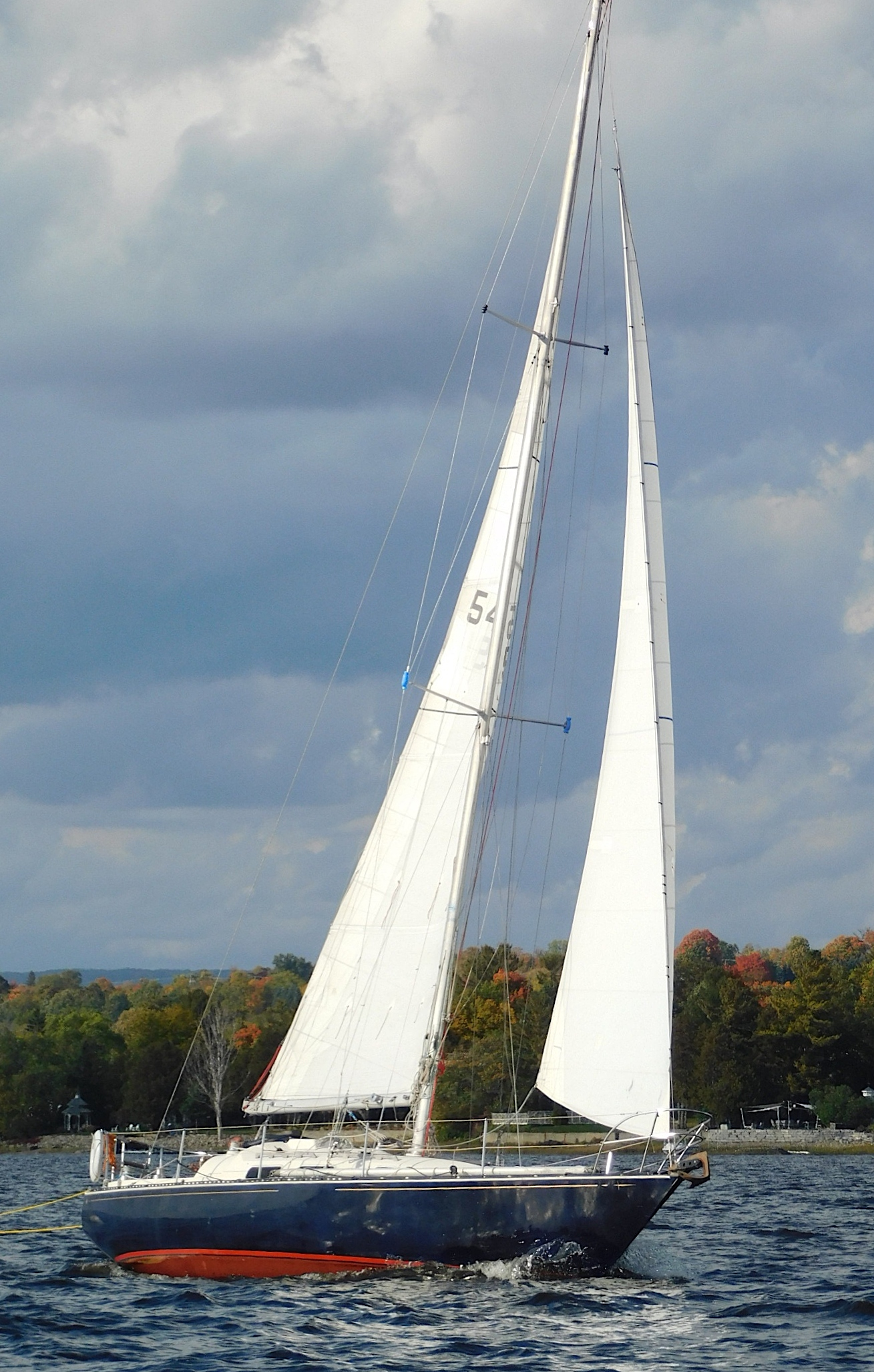

Development
- Designer: C&C Design
- Location: Canada
- Year: 1973
- Builder: Ontario Yachts
- Name: Viking 34

Boat
- Displacement: 8,900 lb (4,037 kg)
- Draft: 6.00 ft (1.83 m)

Hull
- Type: Monohull
- Construction: Fiberglass
- LOA: 33.58 ft (10.24 m)
- LWL: 27.17 ft (8.28 m)
- Beam: 9.83 ft (3.00 m)
- Engine: Inboard motor

Hull appendages
- Keel: swept fin keel
- Ballast: 4,500 lb (2,041 kg)
- Rudder: internally-mounted spade-type rudder

Rig
- Rig type: Bermuda rig
- I foretriangle height: 44.50 ft (13.56 m)
- J foretriangle base: 14.80 ft (4.51 m)
- P mainsail luff: 39.30 ft (11.98 m)
- E mainsail foot: 10.70 ft (3.26 m)

Sails
- Sailplan: Masthead sloop
- Mainsail area: 210.26 sq ft (19.534 m^{2})
- Jib/genoa area: 329.30 sq ft (30.593 m^{2})
- Total sail area: 539.56 sq ft (50.127 m^{2})

Racing
- PHRF: 129 (average)

The Viking 34 is a Canadian sailboat, that was designed by C&C Design and first built in 1973.

The Viking 34 is a development of the Viking 33, with a 1.5 ft (0.46 m) taller mast, 4% more sail area, a 0.5 ft (0.15 m) deeper Peterson-style keel and a revised interior layout.

== Production ==
The design was built by Ontario Yachts in Canada between 1973 and 1982, but it is now out of production.

== Design ==
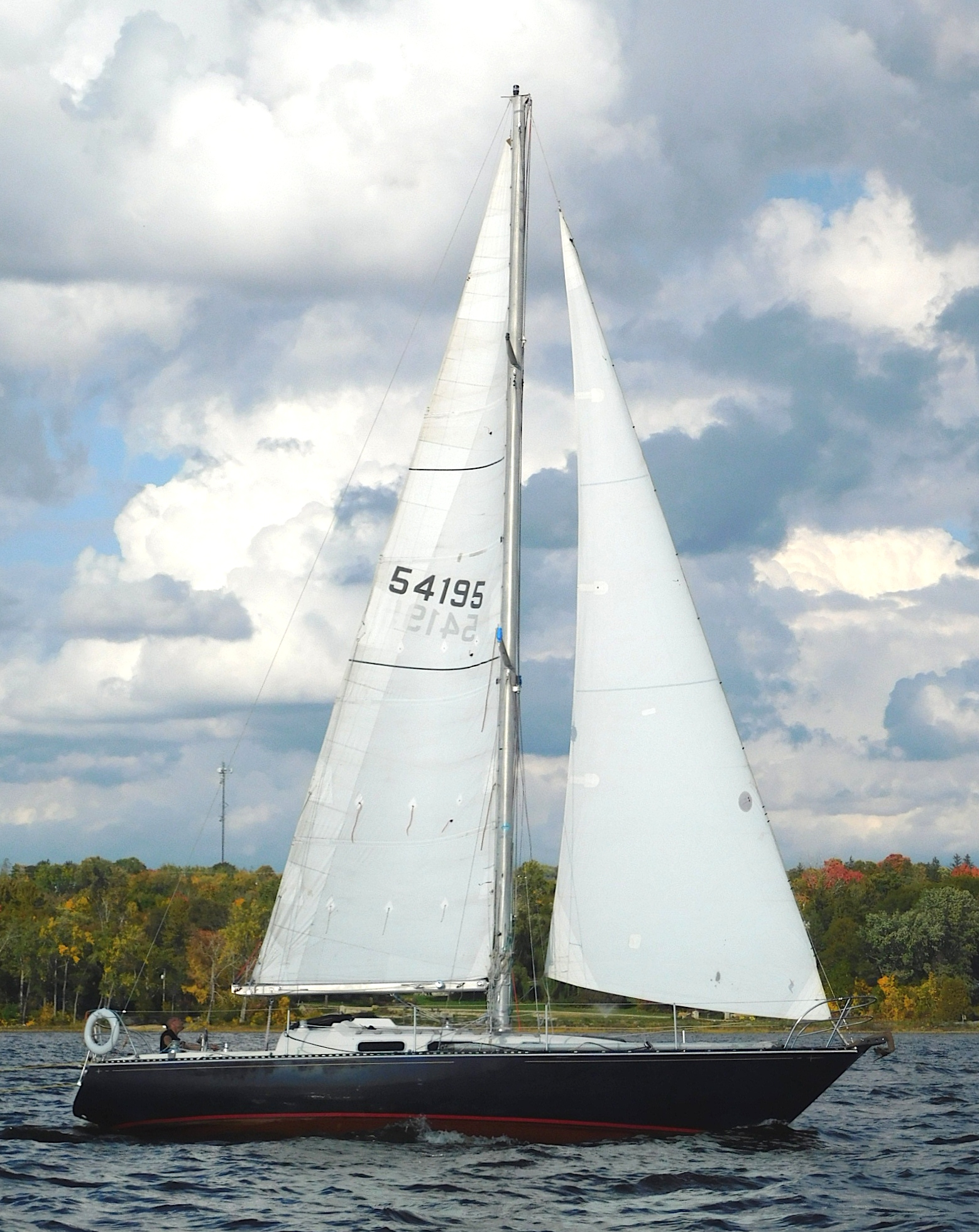
Viking 34

The Viking 34 is a small recreational keelboat, built predominantly of fiberglass, with wood trim. It has a masthead sloop rig, a raked stem, a raised reverse transom, an internally-mounted spade-type rudder controlled by a tiller and a fixed swept Peterson-style fin keel.

The design displaces 8,900 lb (4,037 kg) and carries 4,500 lb (2,041 kg) of ballast.

The boat has a draft of 6.00 ft (1.83 m) with the standard keel fitted.

The design has a PHRF racing average handicap of 129 with a high of 132 and low of 126. It has a hull speed of 6.98 kn (12.93 km/h).

== See also ==
- List of sailing boat types

Related development

- Viking 33

Similar sailboats

- Beneteau 331
- Beneteau First Class 10
- C&C 34
- C&C 34/36
- Catalina 34
- Coast 34
- Columbia 34
- Columbia 34 Mark II
- Creekmore 34
- Crown 34
- CS 34
- Express 34
- Hunter 34
- San Juan 34
- S&S 34
- Sea Sprite 34
- Sun Odyssey 349
- Tartan 34-2
- Tartan 34 C
- UFO 34
