= C&C 34/36 =

Sailboat class

C&C 34/36+
Development
- Designer: Robert W. Ball, Cuthbertson & Cassian (C&C Designs)
- Location: Canada
- Year: 1989
- Brand: C&C
- Builder: C&C Yachts
- Role: Offshore Cruiser/Racer
- Name: C&C 34/36+

Boat
- Displacement: fin keel 12,000 lb (5,443 kg), wing keel 12,525 lb (5,681 kg)
- Draft: fin keel 7.25 ft (2.21 m), wing keel 4.92 ft (1.50 m)
- Air draft: 53.33 ft (16.25 m)

Hull
- Type: Monohull
- Construction: Fiberglass
- LOA: 35.50 ft (10.82 m)
- LWL: 30.83 ft (9.40 m)
- Beam: 11.58 ft (3.53 m)
- Engine: Universal M-25 30 hp (22 kW) or Yanmar 3GM30F 27 hp (20 kW) diesel engine

Hull appendages
- Keel: fin keel, wing keel is an option.
- Ballast: fin keel 4,700 lb (2,132 kg), wing keel 5,225 lb (2,370 kg), both keel types are of lead
- Rudder: internally-mounted spade-type rudder

Rig
- General: Bermuda rig, keel stepped mast
- I foretriangle height: 47.42 ft (14.45 m)
- J foretriangle base: 14.50 ft (4.42 m)
- P mainsail luff: 41.25 ft (12.57 m)
- E mainsail foot: 13.58 ft (4.14 m)

Sails
- Sailplan: Masthead sloop
- Mainsail area: 353.94 sq ft (32.882 m^{2})
- Jib/genoa area: 416.00 sq ft (38.648 m^{2})
- Total sail area: 636 sq ft (59.1 m^{2})

Racing
- PHRF: 144 (average)

The C&C 34/36 is a Canadian sailboat series, designed by Robert W. Ball and first built in 1989. Ball was the chief designer for C&C Yachts between 1969 and 1991.

== Production ==
The boat was built by C&C Yachts in Canada, but it is now out of production. When it was originally introduced it was called the C&C 34, but it replaced the 1977-vintage C&C 34 in production.

== Design ==
The C&C 34/36 series are all recreational keelboats, built predominantly of fiberglass, with wood trim. They all have masthead sloop rigs, reverse transoms and internally-mounted spade-type rudders. The line was introduced in 1989.

The series includes the "+" version, which is a club racer-cruiser, the "R" version, which is a deep keel racing model and a later "XL" model, which combined the performance of the "R" with a cruising interior. There was also the option of a wing keel.

All models have forward and aft cabins, with additional berths in the middle of the main cabin. The head is located just aft of the bow cabin.

The rigging varies from model to model. The mainsheet traveller may be located on the transom, the coach house roof or at the steering pedestal. The jib winches may be located on the cockpit coaming or on the coach house roof. Mast supports include rod-type stays and either a single backstay or running backstays. Some versions have two spreaders, while others have three.

== Variants ==
C&C 34/36
This model has a length overall of 35.50 ft (10.8 m), a waterline length of 30.83 ft (9.4 m), displaces 12,000 lb (5,443 kg). The boat has a draft of 7.20 ft (2.19 m) with the standard keel fitted. The boat is fitted with a Universal M-25 diesel engine of 30 hp (22 kW). The fuel tank holds 40 U.S. gallons (150 L; 33 imp gal) and the fresh water tank has a capacity of 60 U.S. gallons (230 L; 50 imp gal).
C&C 34+DK
This deep keel model has a length overall of 35.50 ft (10.8 m), a waterline length of 30.83 ft (9.4 m), displaces 12,000 lb (5,443 kg) and carries 4,700 lb (2,132 kg) of ballast. The boat has a draft of 7.25 ft (2.21 m) with the standard keel fitted. The boat is fitted with a Japanese Yanmar 3GM30F diesel engine of 40 hp (30 kW). The fuel tank holds 40 U.S. gallons (150 L; 33 imp gal) and the fresh water tank has a capacity of 60 U.S. gallons (230 L; 50 imp gal). The boat has a hull speed of 7.44 kn (13.78 km/h).
C&C 34+R
This model has a length overall of 34.08 ft (10.4 m), a waterline length of 30.58 ft (9.3 m), displaces 12,000 lb (5,443 kg) and carries 4,700 lb (2,132 kg) of lead ballast, although the rig and keel dimensions were changed several times during the production run of this boat. It is built from a fibreglass and Kevlar sandwich, with a balsawood-cored hull and deck. The boat has a draft of 7.42 ft (2.26 m) with the standard keel fitted. The boat is fitted with a Universal M-25 diesel engine of 30 hp (22 kW). The fuel tank holds 40 U.S. gallons (150 L; 33 imp gal) and the fresh water tank has a capacity of 40 U.S. gallons (150 L; 33 imp gal). The boat has hull speed of 7.44 kn (13.78 km/h). This model has a galley with a two-burner propane stove, dual sinks with hot and cold pressurized water and an icebox. A navigation station is located opposite the galley. The interior features varnished teak and a holly cabin sole, while the exterior teak is oiled. Ventilation includes four vented hatches, five opening ports and a forward hatch.
C&C 34+WK
This wing keel model has a length overall of 35.50 ft (10.8 m), a waterline length of 30.83 ft (9.4 m), displaces 12,000 lb (5,443 kg) and carries 5,225 lb (2,370 kg) of lead ballast. The boat has a draft of 5.00 ft (1.52 m) with the standard wing keel fitted. The boat has a PHRF racing average handicap of 144 with a high of 152 and low of 144. It has a hull speed of 7.44 kn (13.78 km/h).
C&C 34XL
Model which combines the performance of the "R", with a cruising interior.
C&C 34-2
This model has a waterline length of 30.83 ft (9.4 m) and a hull speed of 7.44 kn (13.78 km/h).
C&C 34-2 WK
This wing keel model has a waterline length of 30.83 ft (9.4 m) and a hull speed of 7.44 kn (13.78 km/h).

== Operational history ==
In a review of the 34+, Michael McGoldrick wrote, "The C&C 34+ has a brash look which suggests that it was meant to go very fast. For its size, it is a relatively light boat, and it's hard to miss the aggressive looking elliptical-shaped keel. In fact, C&C literature on this boat implies that it was designed as an out-and-out racer, which seems to be confirmed by the fact that it was available as a stripped-down racer (the so-called "R" version of this boat). The 34+ version is a racing/cruising model, but most people would still consider it to be heavily slanted towards racing. The interior of this version comes with athwartship aft cabin, an aft head, a contoured dinette/settee, and a navigation station. There is also a "XL" version of this boat which consists of the racing model with a few amenities thrown in below to make the interior a little more livable."

== See also ==
- List of sailing boat types

Similar sailboats

- Beneteau 331
- Beneteau First Class 10
- C&C 35
- C&C 36R
- Cal 35
- Cal 35 Cruise
- Catalina 34
- Coast 34
- Columbia 34
- Columbia 34 Mark II
- Crown 34
- CS 34
- Express 34
- Express 35
- Freedom 35
- Goderich 35
- Hughes 36
- Hughes-Columbia 36
- Hunter 34
- Hunter 35 Legend
- Hunter 35.5 Legend
- Hunter 356
- Island Packet 35
- Landfall 35
- Mirage 35
- Niagara 35
- Pilot 35
- San Juan 34
- Sea Sprite 34
- Southern Cross 35
- Sun Odyssey 349
- Tartan 34 C
- Tartan 34-2
- Viking 34
