= Beneteau 331 =

Sailboat class

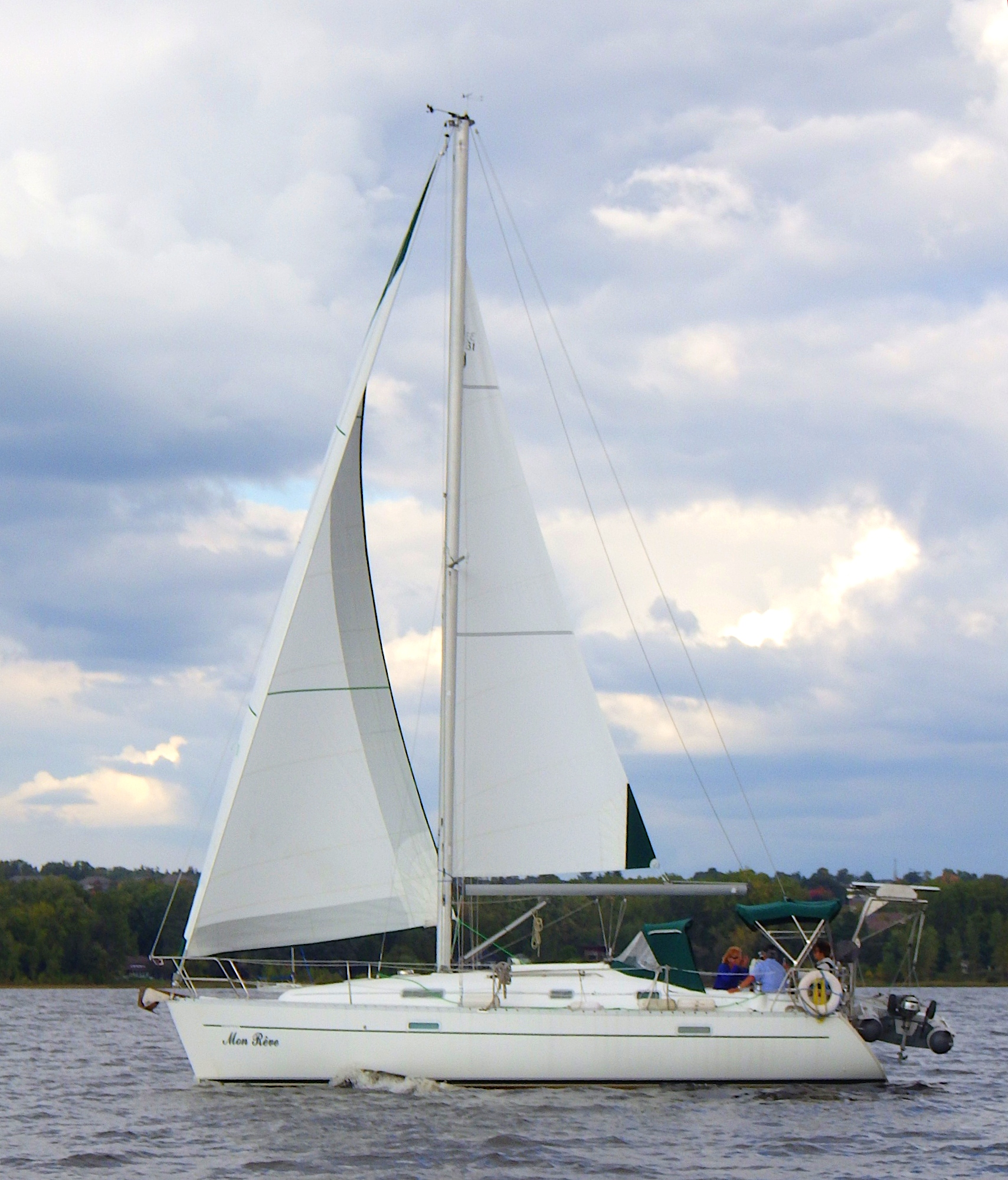

Development
- Designer: Group Finot/Conq
- Location: France
- Year: 2001
- No. built: 822
- Builder: Beneteau
- Role: Cruiser
- Name: Beneteau 331

Boat
- Displacement: 11,173 lb (5,068 kg)
- Draft: 5.50 ft (1.68 m)

Hull
- Type: Monohull
- Construction: Fiberglass
- LOA: 33.92 ft (10.34 m)
- LWL: 30.50 ft (9.30 m)
- Beam: 11.33 ft (3.45 m)
- Engine: Westerbeke 27 hp (20 kW) diesel engine

Hull appendages
- Keel: fin keel
- Ballast: 3,253 lb (1,476 kg)
- Rudder: spade-type rudder

Rig
- Rig type: Bermuda rig
- I foretriangle height: 41.08 ft (12.52 m)
- J foretriangle base: 12.34 ft (3.76 m)
- P mainsail luff: 34.58 ft (10.54 m)
- E mainsail foot: 14.27 ft (4.35 m)

Sails
- Sailplan: Masthead sloop
- Mainsail area: 246.73 sq ft (22.922 m^{2})
- Jib/genoa area: 253.46 sq ft (23.547 m^{2})
- Spinnaker area: 850 sq ft (79 m^{2})
- Total sail area: 500.19 sq ft (46.469 m^{2})

The Beneteau 331 is a French sailboat that was designed by Group Finot/Conq for cruising and first built in 1999.

The Beneteau 331 has also been marketed as the Oceanis 331, Oceanis Clipper 331 and Moorings 332.

The design replaced the Oceanis 321 in the company's line.

== Production ==
The design was built by Beneteau in France and in the United States, with 822 examples completed between 1999 and 2004, but it is now out of production. It was introduced in 1999 as a 2000 model.

== Design ==
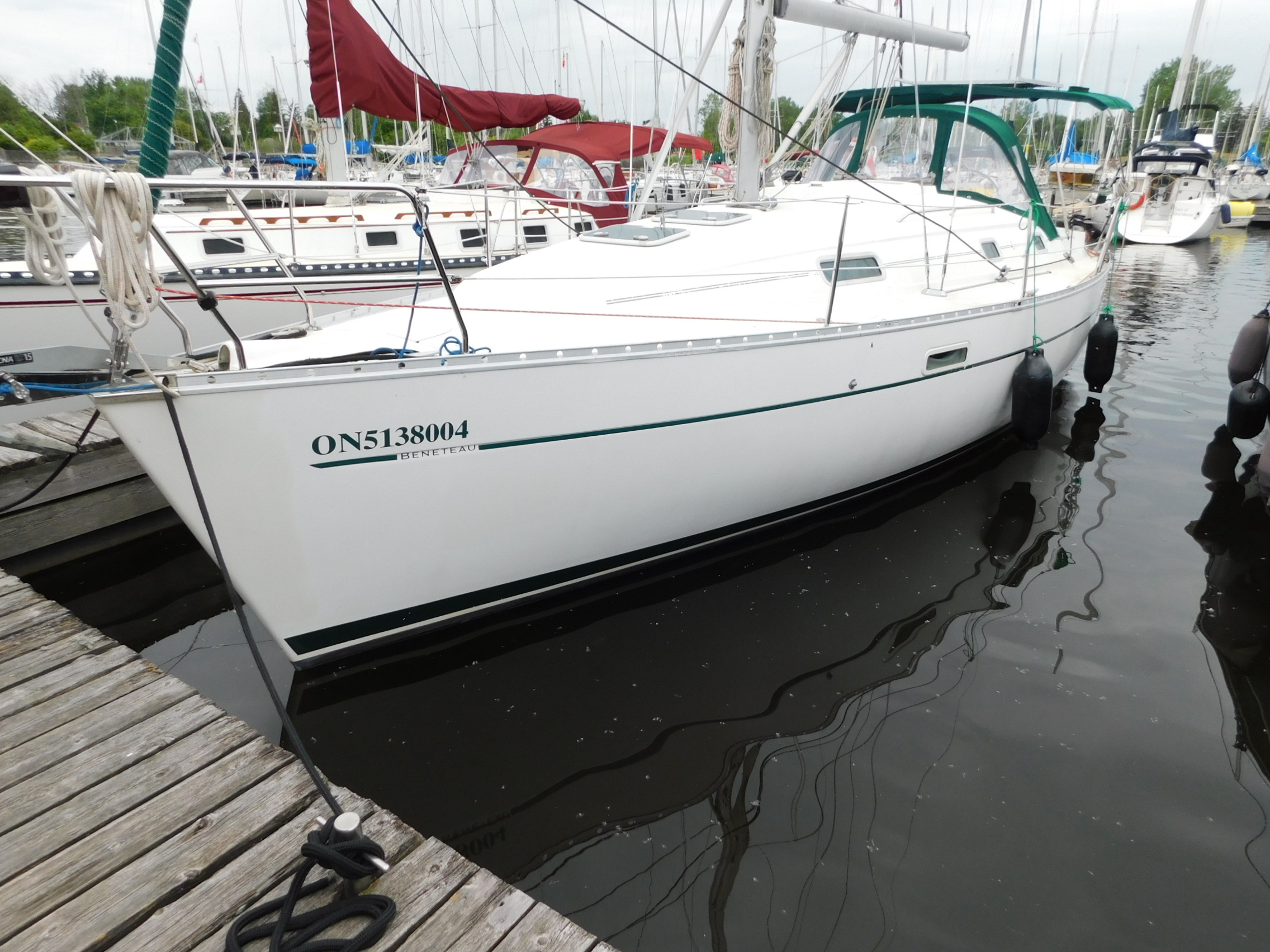
Beneteau 331

The Beneteau 331 is a recreational keelboat, built predominantly of solid fiberglass with the deck balsa-cored. It has a masthead sloop rig, aluminum spars, a deck-stepped mast, a raked stem, a walk-through reverse transom, an internally mounted spade-type rudder controlled by a wheel and a fixed fin keel, shoal draft keel or lifting keel. It can be equipped with a spinnaker of 850 sq ft (79 m^{2}).

The interior layouts vary, based on the model and role, but a typical layout has sleeping accommodation for four to six people, with a double "V"-berth in the bow cabin, two straight settees in the main cabin around a drop-leaf table and an aft cabin with a double berth. The galley is located on the port side just forward of the companionway ladder. The galley is U-shaped and is equipped with a two-burner stove, 39.6 U.S. gallons (150 L; 33.0 imp gal) icebox and a single sink. A navigation station is forward of the galley, on the port side. The head is located opposite the galley on the starboard side and includes a shower. A three-cabin layout was also available.

Headroom is 74 in (188 cm) in the galley and head, 74 in (188 cm) in the main and aft cabins and 73 in (185 cm) in the bow cabin.

The design has a hull speed of 7.40 kn (14 km/h).

== Variants ==
Beneteau 331
This model has a length overall of 33.92 ft (10.3 m), a waterline length of 30.50 ft (9.3 m), displaces 11,173 lb (5,068 kg) and carries 3,253 lb (1,476 kg) of ballast. The boat has a draft of 5.50 ft (1.68 m) with the standard fin and weighted bulb keel. It was also sold with a shoal draft bulb keel and lifting keel with twin rudders. The boat is fitted with a Westerbeke diesel engine of 27 hp (20 kW). The fuel tank holds 18 U.S. gallons (68 L; 15 imp gal) and the fresh water tank has a capacity of 48 U.S. gallons (180 L; 40 imp gal).
Oceanis 331
This model has a length overall of 33.96 ft (10.4 m), a waterline length of 30.51 ft (9.3 m), displaces 9,920 lb (4,500 kg) and carries 3,086 lb (1,400 kg) of ballast. The boat has a draft of 5.25 ft (1.60 m) with the standard fin and weighted bulb keel and 3.33 ft (1.01 m) with the optional shoal draft bulb keel. A lifting keel with twin rudders was also offered. The boat is fitted with a Swedish Volvo diesel engine. The fuel tank holds 18 U.S. gallons (68 L; 15 imp gal) and the fresh water tank has a capacity of 52 U.S. gallons (200 L; 43 imp gal).
Moorings 332
Model with three cabins, for the yacht charter market.

== Operational history ==
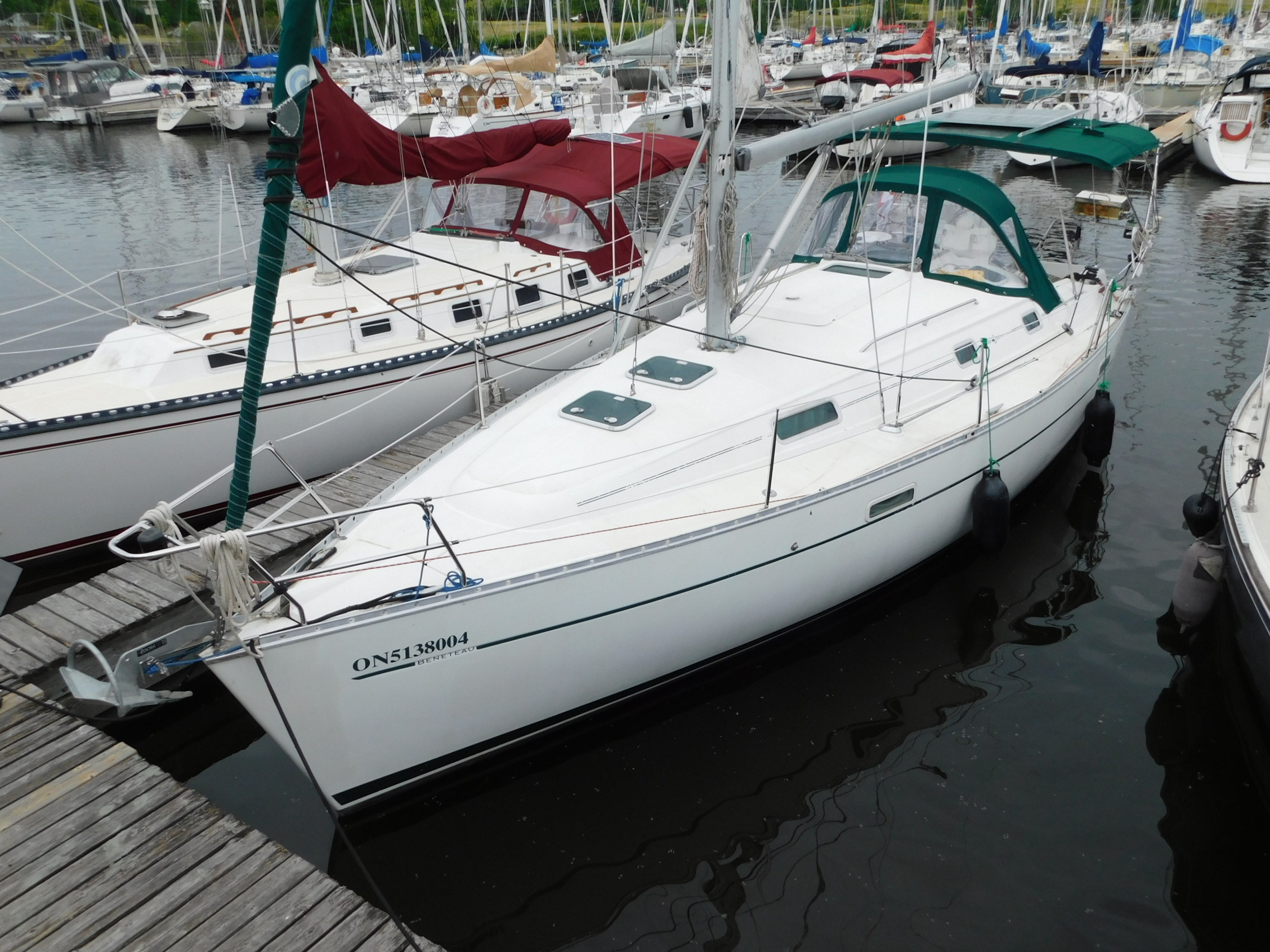
Beneteau 331

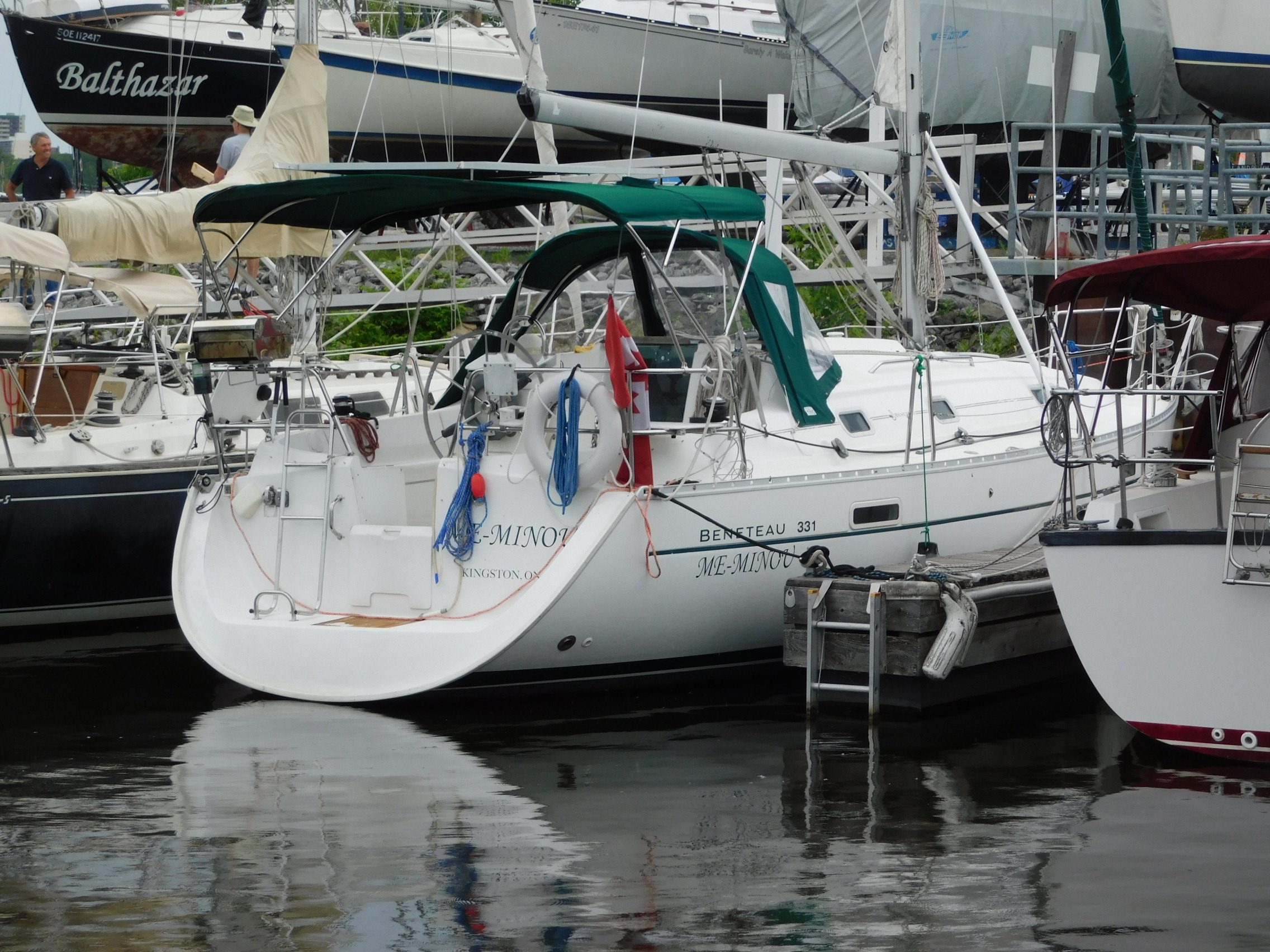
Beneteau 331 transom

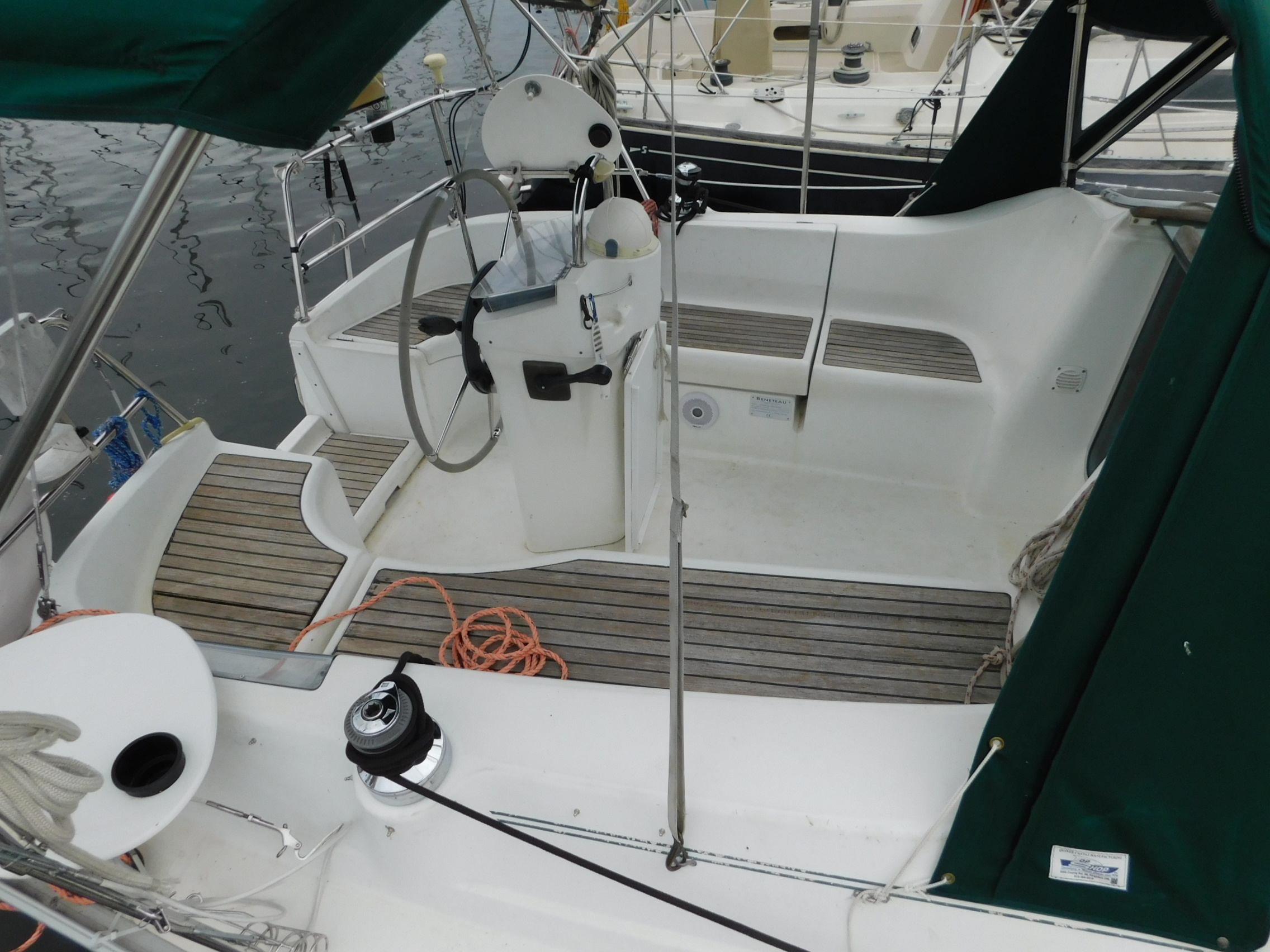
Beneteau 331 cockpit

A review described the design, "the Beneteau 331 offers a sophisticated hull with traditional lines. A spacious cockpit, top-of-the-line deck hardware and a roller furling main accent her ease of handling. The 331 features lots of extras such as an optional retractable keel, standard refrigeration, improved ventilation and additional electronics."

== See also ==
- List of sailing boat types

Similar sailboats

- Beneteau First Class 10
- C&C 34
- C&C 34/36
- Catalina 34
- Coast 34
- Columbia 34
- Columbia 34 Mark II
- Creekmore 34
- Crown 34
- CS 34
- Express 34
- Hunter 34
- San Juan 34
- Sea Sprite 34
- Sun Odyssey 349
- Tartan 34 C
- Tartan 34-2
- Viking 34
