= Coast 34 =

Sailboat class

Development
- Designer: Bruce Roberts and Grahame Shannon
- Location: Canada
- Year: 1980
- Builders: Clearwater Marine; Cape Marine; Windward Marine
- Role: Cruiser
- Name: Coast 34

Boat
- Displacement: 15,750 lb (7,144 kg)
- Draft: 5.50 ft (1.68 m)

Hull
- Type: Monohull
- Construction: Fibreglass
- LOA: 34.33 ft (10.46 m)
- LWL: 28.67 ft (8.74 m)
- Beam: 11.48 ft (3.50 m)
- Engine: Yanmar 3GM 27 hp (20 kW) diesel engine

Hull appendages
- Keel: fin keel
- Ballast: 6,400 lb (2,903 kg)
- Rudder: skeg-mounted rudder

Rig
- Rig type: Bermuda rig

Sails
- Sailplan: Masthead sloop
- Mainsail area: 265 sq ft (24.6 m^{2})
- Jib/genoa area: 225 sq ft (20.9 m^{2})
- Spinnaker area: 815 sq ft (75.7 m^{2})
- Other sails: staysail: 140 sq ft (13 m^{2})
- Total sail area: 625 sq ft (58.1 m^{2})

The Coast 34 is a Canadian sailboat that was designed by Bruce Roberts and Grahame Shannon as a cruiser and first built in 1980.

The Coast 34 is a development of an earlier Roberts design for amateur construction.

The design was also sold as the Passage 34, Roberts 34, and the Westcoast 34.

== Production ==
The design was possibly first built by Clearwater Marine and was later constructed by Cape Marine and Windward Marine in Canada, but it is now out of production.

== Design ==
The Coast 34 is a recreational keelboat, built predominantly of fibreglass, with a foam core used in the hull above the waterline. It also has wooden trim. The design has a masthead sloop rig, or optional cutter rig, with aluminum spars, a spooned raked stem, a rounded bulbous transom, a skeg-mounted rudder controlled by a wheel and a fixed fin keel. It displaces 15,750 lb (7,144 kg) and carries 6,400 lb (2,903 kg) of ballast.

The design was available in a conventional cockpit version or with a pilothouse.

The boat has a draft of 5.50 ft (1.68 m) with the standard keel fitted and a draft of 5.00 ft (1.52 m) with the optional shoal draft keel.

The boat was factory-fitted with a Japanese Yanmar 3GM diesel engine of 27 hp (20 kW) for docking and maneuvering, with a Volvo engine optional. The fuel tank holds 56 U.S. gallons (210 L; 47 imp gal) and the fresh water tank has a capacity of 110 U.S. gallons (420 L; 92 imp gal).

The sleeping accommodation includes a bow port side double berth and an aft, starboard side double berth under the cockpit. The saloon provides additional sleeping space and has three seats to starboard and a U-shaped dinette to port. The galley is on the port side at the foot of the companionway steps and includes a three burner gimbal-mounted propane-fuelled stove. The head is forward on the port side, just aft of the bow cabin and includes a shower with a grated drain. There are provisions for wood or diesel cabin heating. A navigation table is provided.

Ventilation includes three opening hatches above the bow berth, head and the passageway. The main saloon has ten opening ports and four Dorade vents.

The bow has a self-draining anchor-locker and dual anchor rollers. The cabin roof has self-tailing winches for the internally-mounted halyards. Genoa and staysail sheet tracks are provided and the mainsail has a cockpit-mounted mainsheet traveller.

== See also ==
- List of sailing boat types

Similar sailboats

- Beneteau 331
- Beneteau First Class 10
- C&C 34
- C&C 34/36
- Catalina 34
- Columbia 34
- Columbia 34 Mark II
- Creekmore 34
- Crown 34
- CS 34
- Express 34
- Hunter 34
- San Juan 34
- Sea Sprite 34
- Sun Odyssey 349
- Tartan 34 C
- Tartan 34-2
- Viking 34
