= Columbia 34 =

Sailboat class

Development
- Designer: Wirth Munroe and Richard Valdez
- Location: United States
- Year: 1966
- Builder: Columbia Yachts
- Name: Columbia 34

Boat
- Displacement: 10,500 lb (4,763 kg)
- Draft: 8.00 ft (2.44 m) with centerboard down

Hull
- Type: Monohull
- Construction: Fiberglass
- LOA: 34 ft (10 m)
- LWL: 23.58 ft (7.19 m)
- Beam: 9.92 ft (3.02 m)
- Engine: Universal Atomic 4 gasoline engine

Hull appendages
- Keel: long keel with centerboard
- Ballast: 4,200 lb (1,905 kg)
- Rudder: internally-mounted spade-type rudder

Rig
- Rig type: Bermuda rig
- I foretriangle height: 36.80 ft (11.22 m)
- J foretriangle base: 12.30 ft (3.75 m)
- P mainsail luff: 32.00 ft (9.75 m)
- E mainsail foot: 15.00 ft (4.57 m)

Sails
- Sailplan: Masthead sloop
- Mainsail area: 240.00 sq ft (22.297 m^{2})
- Jib/genoa area: 226.32 sq ft (21.026 m^{2})
- Total sail area: 466.32 sq ft (43.323 m^{2})

The Columbia 34 is an American sailboat that was designed by Wirth Munroe and Richard Valdez as a cruiser and first built in 1966.

The Columbia 34 is a development of the Columbia 33 Caribbean, using a deck adapted from the Columbia 40.

The Columbia 34 was replaced in the company product line in 1970, by the unrelated William H. Tripp Jr. designed Columbia 34 Mark II.

== Production ==
The design was built by Columbia Yachts in the United States, but it is now out of production. Some of the boats were sold as kits for owner completion.

== Design ==
Dick Valdes described how the Columbia 34 design came about, in a talk given at the Long Beach Rendezvous on 23 February 2002. He said, "The C-33 was a fast and comfortable boat from Wirth Monroe who had designed and raced Commanche in the SORC. The boat was a direct descendent of Commanche but Wirth didn't have an eye for looks and we all called the C-33 the "Guanno" boat cause it looked like ----.! (Mike, a C-33 owner notes: they still had the nerve to market it as a "flagship" in the brochures). So after about fifty boats we decided to see if we could make a change. So we took a C-40 deck we had laying around and set it on a C-33 and it pretty much fit, and looked much better, so we took a saw and trimmed off all the overhangs and that's how the C-34 was born."

The Columbia 34 is a recreational keelboat, built predominantly of fiberglass, with wood trim. It has a masthead sloop rig, a spooned raked stem, a raised counter, transom, an internally mounted spade-type rudder controlled by a tiller and a fixed stub long keel, with a centerboard. It displaces 10,500 lb (4,763 kg) and carries 4,200 lb (1,905 kg) of ballast.

The boat has a draft of 8.00 ft (2.44 m) with the centreboard extended and 3.50 ft (1.07 m) with it retracted. The boat is fitted with a Universal Atomic 4 gasoline engine for docking and maneuvering.

The galley is located on the port side at the bottom of the companionway steps and features a two-burner stove. The head has a privacy door and is located forward, just aft of the bow "V"-berth and opposite the hanging locker. Additional sleeping accommodation includes the main cabin dinette table, which can be converted into a double berth, a single berth on the starboard side and an aft port side quarter berth. The raised stern counter configuration precludes an aft stateroom.

== See also ==
- List of sailing boat types

Related development

- Columbia 33 Caribbean
- Columbia 34 Mark II
- Columbia 40

Similar sailboats

- Beneteau 331
- Beneteau First Class 10
- C&C 34
- C&C 34/36
- Catalina 34
- Coast 34
- Creekmore 34
- Crown 34
- CS 34
- Express 34
- Hunter 34
- San Juan 34
- Sea Sprite 34
- Sun Odyssey 349
- Tartan 34 C
- Tartan 34-2
- Viking 34
