= San Juan 34 =

Sailboat class

Development
- Designer: Hein Driehuyzen, modified by Don Clark
- Location: United States
- Year: 1980
- Builder: Clark Boat Company
- Name: San Juan 34

Boat
- Displacement: 10,500 lb (4,763 kg)
- Draft: 5.92 ft (1.80 m)

Hull
- Type: Monohull
- Construction: Fiberglass
- LOA: 33.80 ft (10.30 m)
- LWL: 27.92 ft (8.51 m)
- Beam: 10.92 ft (3.33 m)
- Engine: Yanmar 3GM 24 hp (18 kW) diesel engine

Hull appendages
- Keel: fin keel
- Ballast: 4,800 lb (2,177 kg)
- Rudder: skeg-mounted rudder

Rig
- General: Masthead sloop
- I foretriangle height: 45.25 ft (13.79 m)
- J foretriangle base: 14.75 ft (4.50 m)
- P mainsail luff: 39.50 ft (12.04 m)
- E mainsail foot: 11.00 ft (3.35 m)

Sails
- Mainsail area: 217.25 sq ft (20.183 m^{2})
- Jib/genoa area: 333.72 sq ft (31.004 m^{2})
- Total sail area: 550.97 sq ft (51.187 m^{2})

Racing
- PHRF: 132 (TM version, average)

The San Juan 34 is an American sailboat, that was originally designed by Canadian Hein Driehuyzen, modified by Don Clark and first built in 1980.

The San Juan 34 design is a development of the 1975 Crown 34.

== Production ==
The Crown 34 was first built by Calgan Marine in North Vancouver, BC, Canada, with 30 examples completed between 1975 and 1979.

After production of the Crown 34 ended in 1979, the molds were sold to GlassFab of Monroe, Washington, United States. That company only built five examples, under the name Sun 1020. The molds were then repossessed by Calgan and later sold to the Clark Boat Company in Kent, Washington. After some modifications, the design became the San Juan 34, which was introduced in 1980 and built until 1986.

== Design ==
The San Juan 34 is a small recreational keelboat, built predominantly of fiberglass, with wood trim. It has a masthead sloop rig, a reverse transom, a skeg-mounted rudder and a fixed fin keel.

The boat is fitted with a Japanese Yanmar 3GM diesel engine of 24 hp (18 kW). The fuel tank holds 22 U.S. gallons (83 L; 18 imp gal) and the fresh water tank has a capacity of 50 U.S. gallons (190 L; 42 imp gal).

The boat has a hull speed of 7.08 kn (13.11 km/h).

== Variants ==
San Juan 34
Base model with a draft of 5.92 ft (1.80 m) with the standard keel. It displaces 10,500 lb (4,763 kg) and carries 4,800 lb (2,177 kg) of ballast.
San Juan 34 SD
Shoal draft keel model, with a draft of 5.25 ft (1.60 m). It displaces 12,500 lb (5,670 kg) and carries 5,300 lb (2,404 kg) of ballast. The boat has a PHRF racing average handicap of 141 with a high of 141 and low of 141.
San Juan 34 TM
Tall mast model, with a mast about 1.25 ft (0.4 m) taller. The boat has a PHRF racing average handicap of 132 with a high of 120 and low of 142.

== See also ==
- List of sailing boat types

Similar sailboats

- Beneteau 331
- Beneteau First Class 10
- C&C 34
- C&C 34/36
- Catalina 34
- Coast 34
- Columbia 34
- Columbia 34 Mark II
- Creekmore 34
- CS 34
- Express 34
- Hunter 34
- Sea Sprite 34
- Sun Odyssey 349
- Tartan 34 C
- Tartan 34-2
- Viking 34
