= Sun Odyssey 349 =

Sailboat class

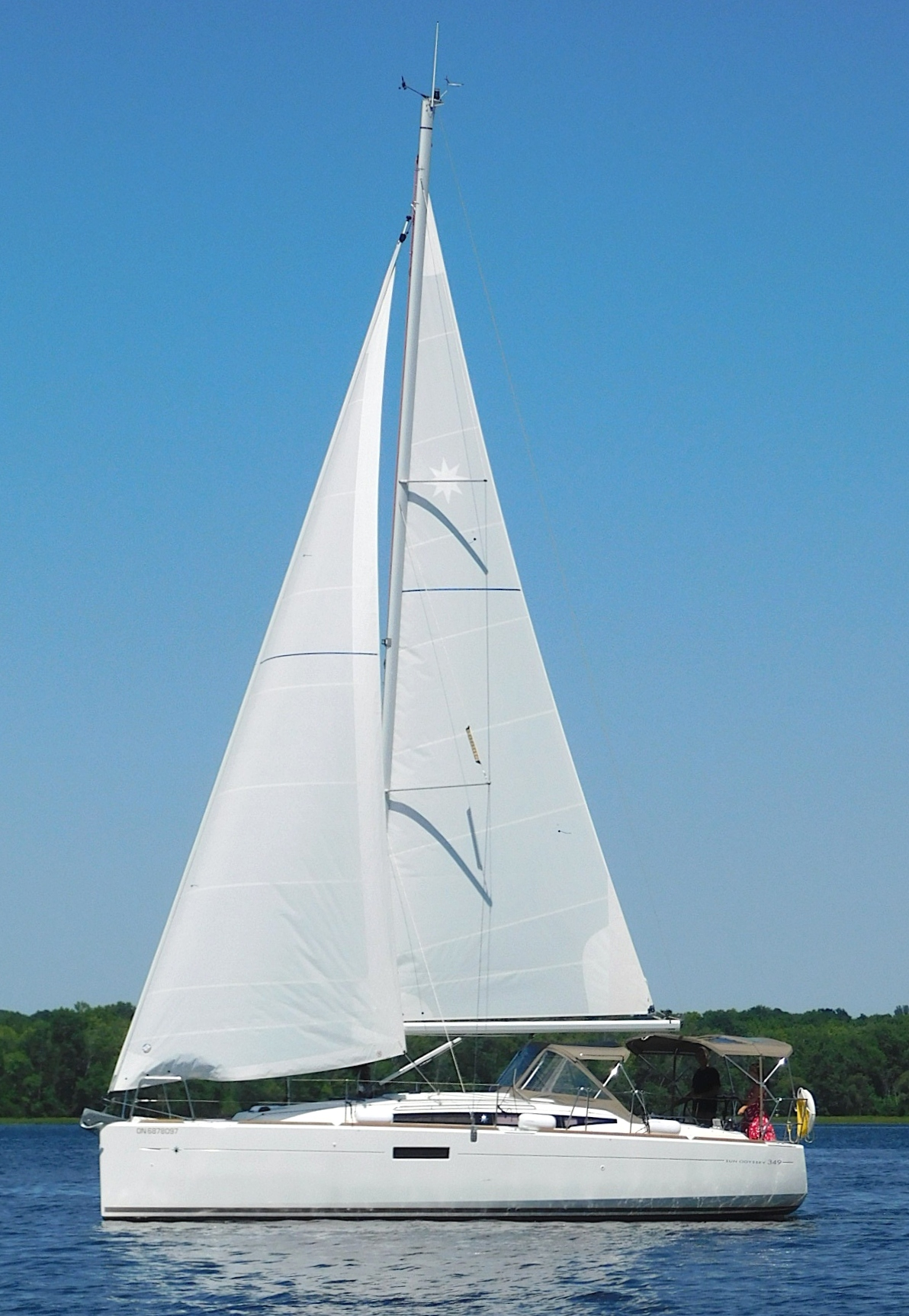

Development
- Designer: Marc Lombard Design
- Location: Canada United States
- Year: 2014
- Builder: Jeanneau
- Role: Cruiser
- Name: Sun Odyssey 349

Boat
- Displacement: 11,795 lb (5,350 kg)
- Draft: 6.50 ft (1.98 m)

Hull
- Type: Monohull
- Construction: Fiberglass
- LOA: 33.92 ft (10.34 m)
- LWL: 30.84 ft (9.40 m)
- Beam: 11.29 ft (3.44 m)
- Engine: Yanmar 3YM20 21 hp (16 kW) diesel engine

Hull appendages
- Keel: fin keel with a weighted bulb
- Ballast: 3,483 lb (1,580 kg)
- Rudder: twin spade-type rudders

Rig
- Rig type: Bermuda rig
- I foretriangle height: 43.57 ft (13.28 m)
- J foretriangle base: 12.37 ft (3.77 m)
- P mainsail luff: 40.68 ft (12.40 m)
- E mainsail foot: 13.62 ft (4.15 m)

Sails
- Sailplan: Fractional rigged sloop
- Mainsail area: 277.03 sq ft (25.737 m^{2})
- Jib/genoa area: 269.48 sq ft (25.036 m^{2})
- Spinnaker area: 1,023 sq ft (95.0 m^{2})
- Total sail area: 546.51 sq ft (50.772 m^{2})

The Sun Odyssey 349 is a French sailboat that was designed by Marc Lombard Design for cruising and first built in 2014.

== Production ==
The design is built by Jeanneau in France and in the United States starting in 2014. It remained in production in 2020.

== Design ==
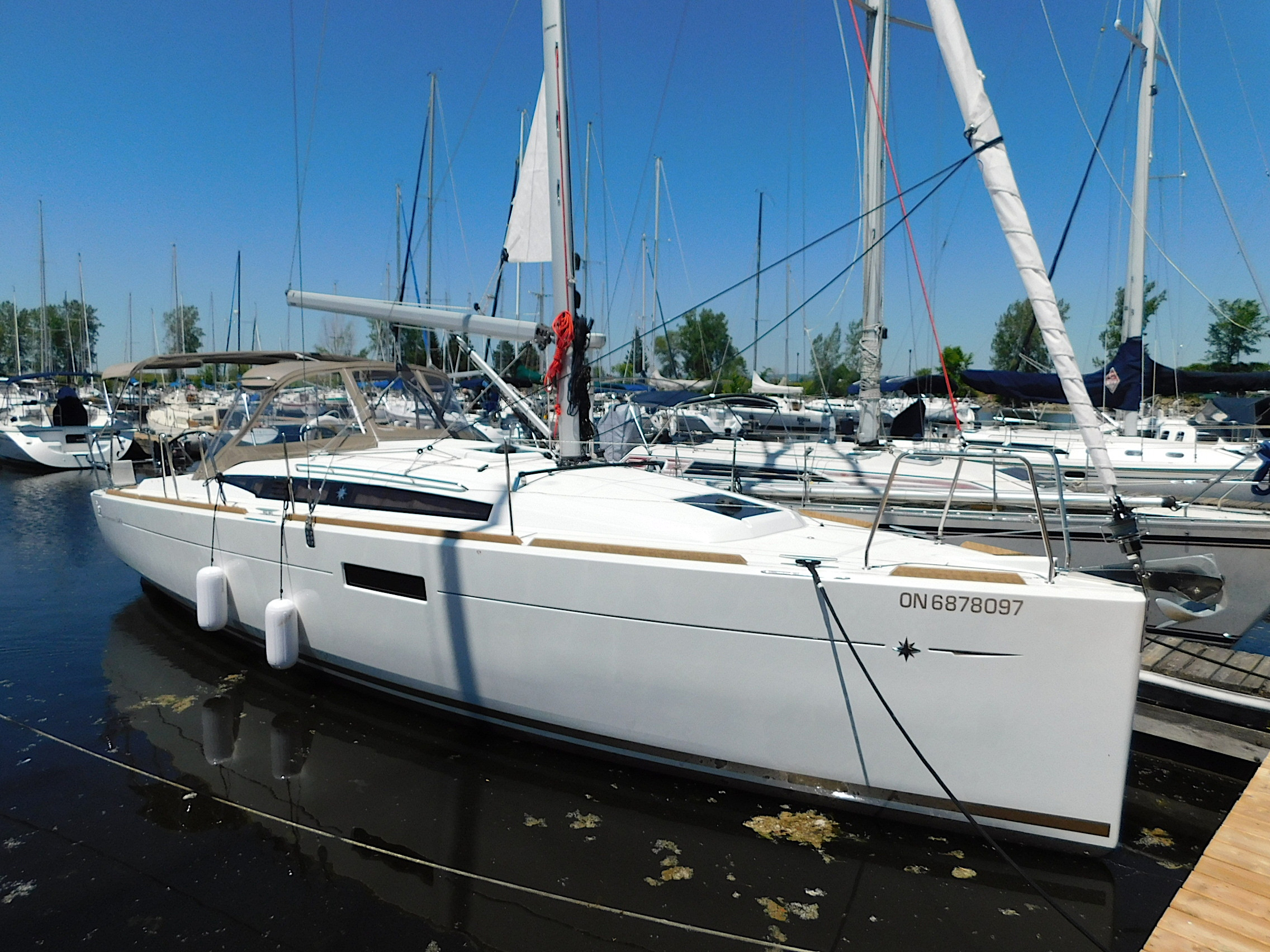
Sun Odyssey 349

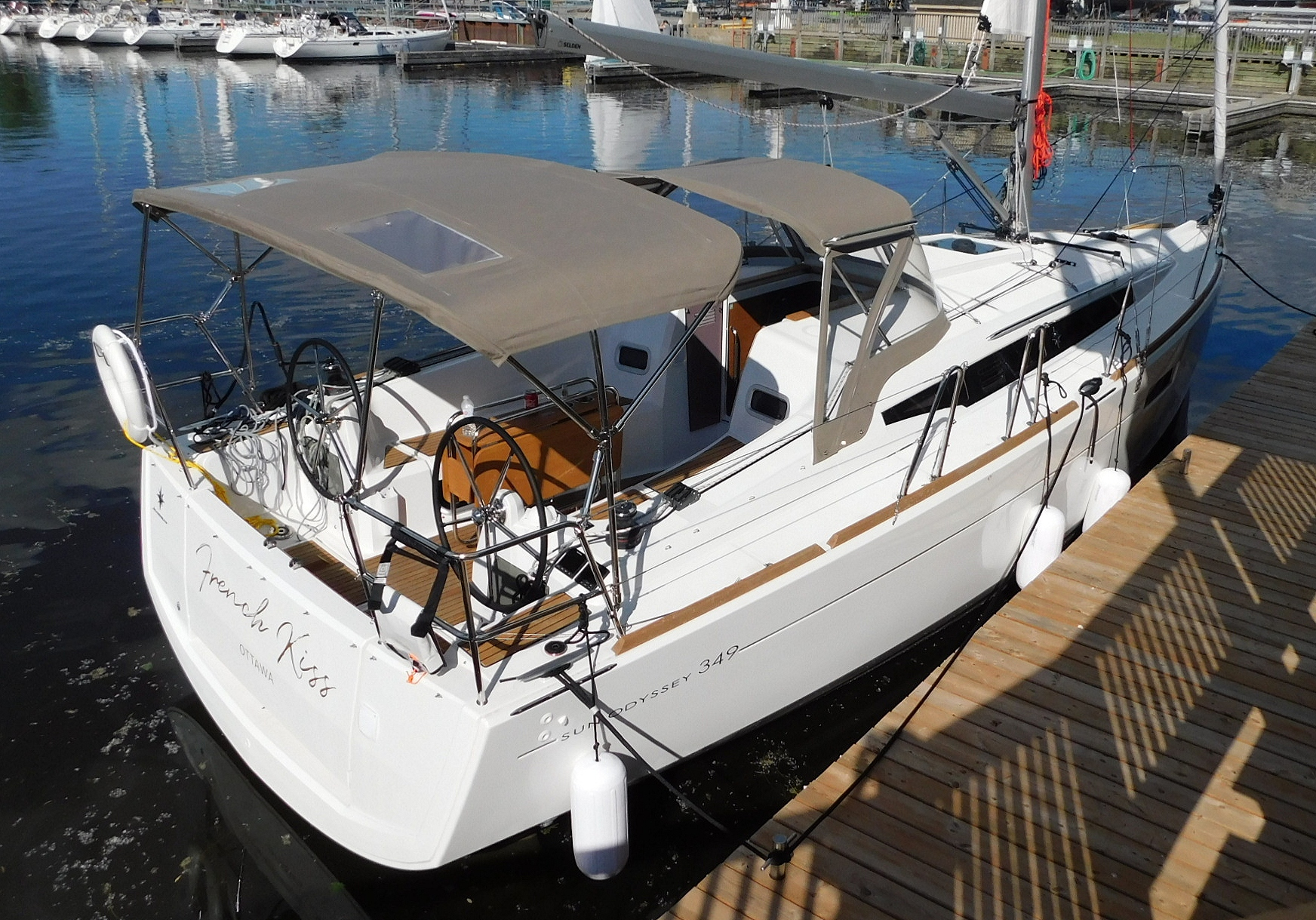
Sun Odyssey 349 showing the transom, with the drop-down swim platform in the "stowed" position

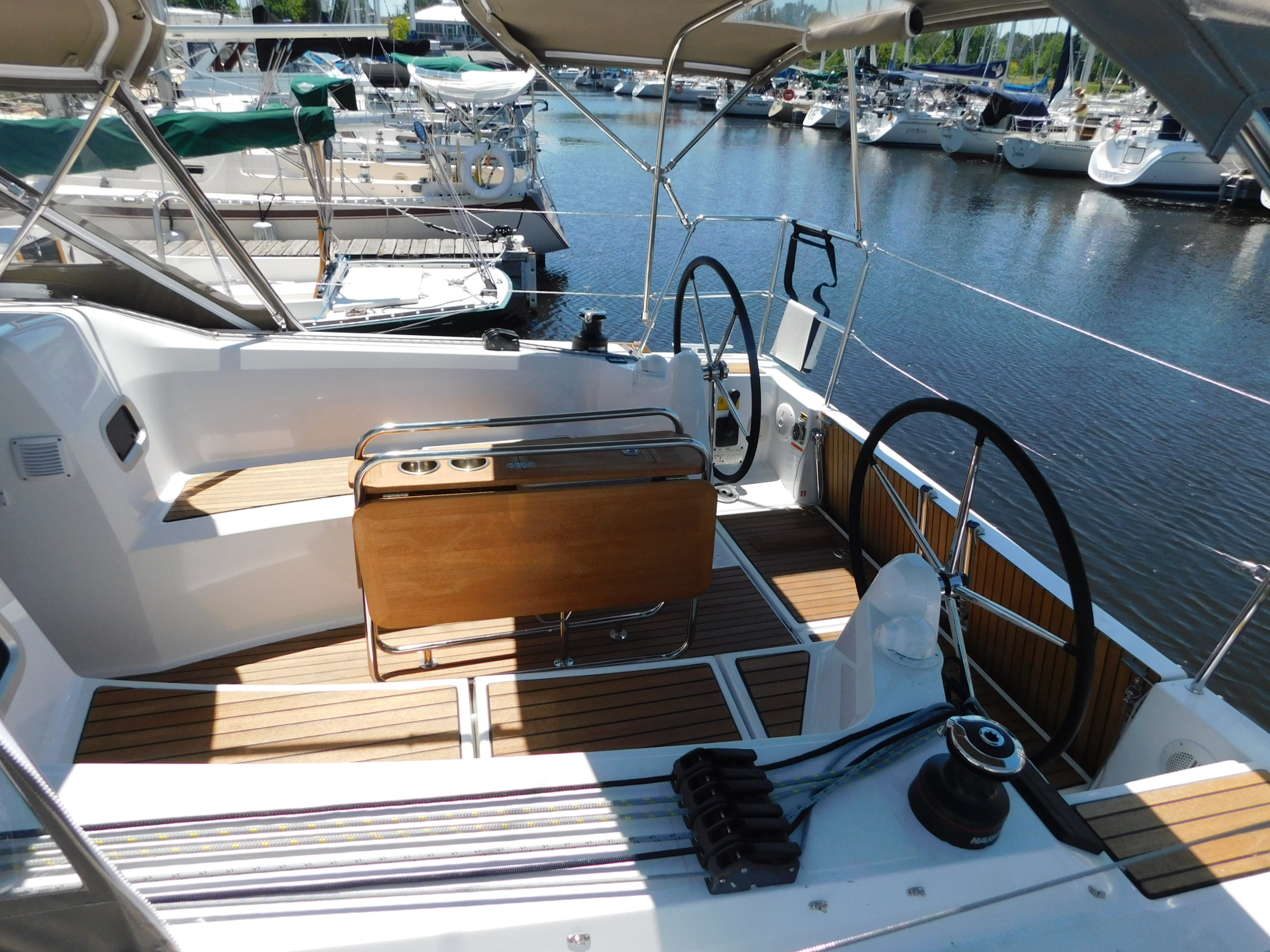
Sun Odyssey 349 cockpit, showing the dual wheels and drop leaf cockpit table.

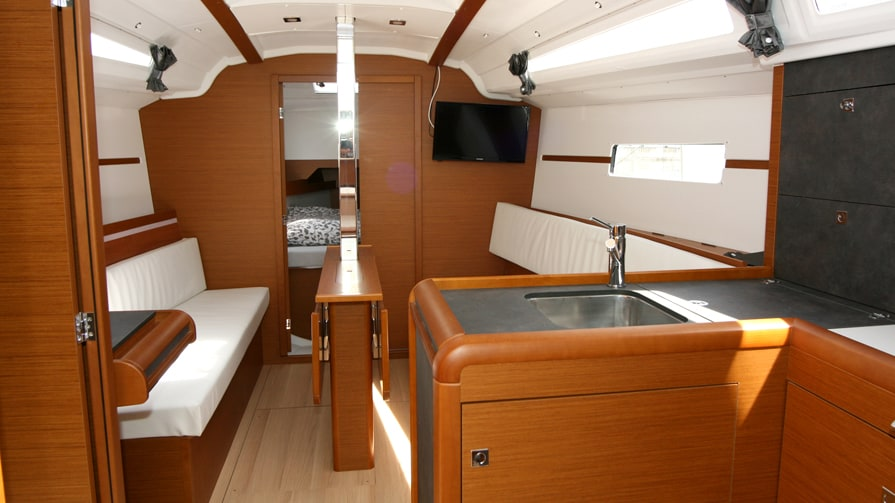
Sun Odyssey 349 salon interior

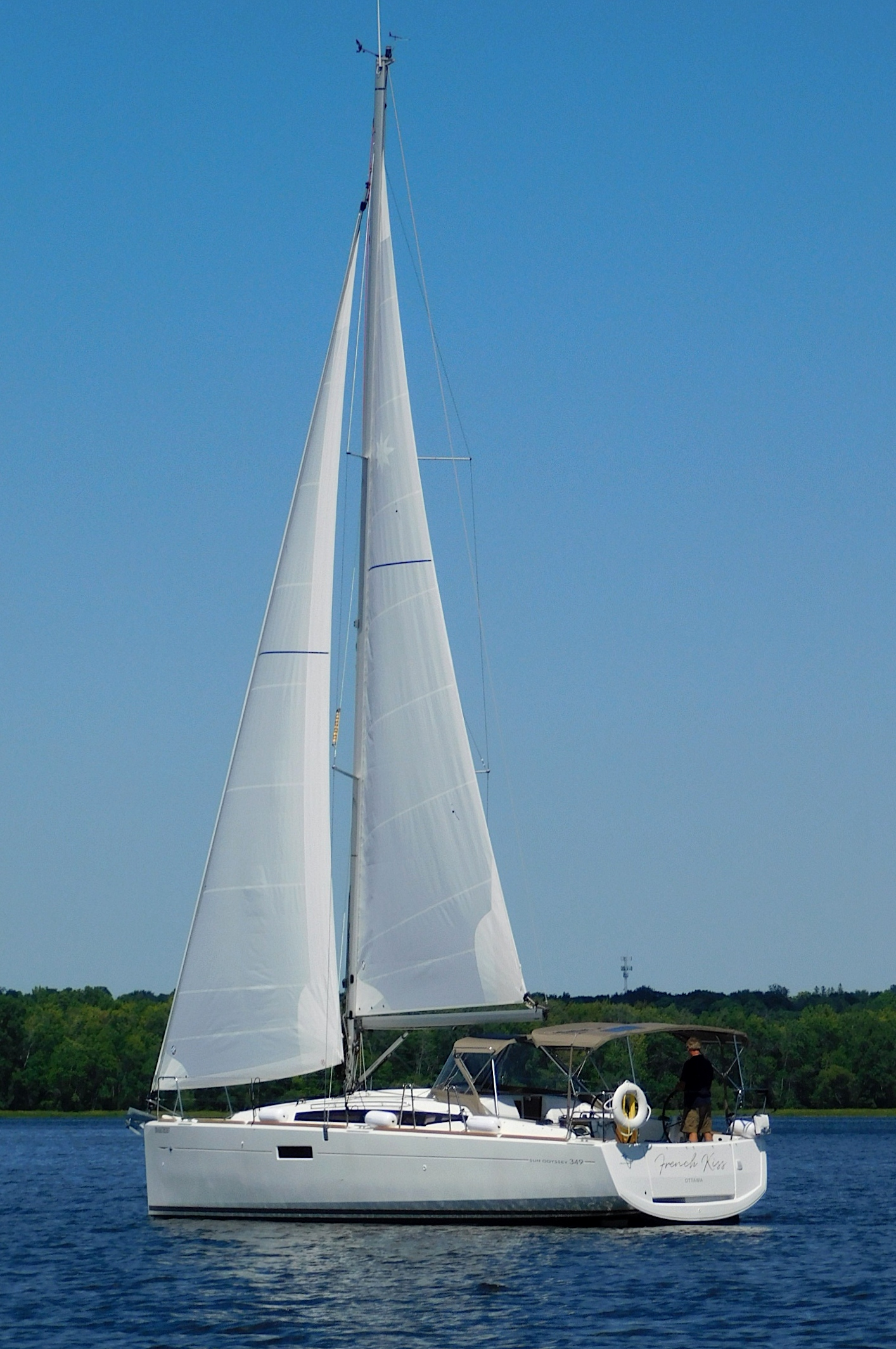
Sun Odyssey 349

The Sun Odyssey 349 is a recreational keelboat, built predominantly of fiberglass with a hard chine hull. The deck is injection molded with an end-grain balsa core. It has a 9/10 fractional sloop rig with a deck-stepped mast, Technique Voile sails, double aft-swept spreaders, aluminum spars and no backstay. Sail control uses friction rings instead of a mainsheet traveler and a rigid boom vang. It features a plumb stem, a slightly reverse transom with a gas strut assisted, drop-down tailgate-style swimming platform, dual internally mounted spade-type rudders controlled by two wheels and a fixed fin keel, shoal draft wing keel or lifting keel. It can also be equipped with an asymmetrical spinnaker of 1,023 sq ft (95.0 m^{2}).

The boat is fitted with a Japanese Yanmar 3YM20 diesel engine of 21 hp (16 kW) for docking and maneuvering. The fuel tank holds 34 U.S. gallons (130 L; 28 imp gal) and the fresh water tank has a capacity of 54 U.S. gallons (200 L; 45 imp gal).

The design has sleeping accommodation for six to eight people, with a double "V"-berth in the bow cabin, two straight settees on either side of a drop-leaf table in the main cabin and an aft cabin with a double berth on the starboard side or optional dual aft cabins. The galley is located on the starboard side just forward of the companionway ladder. The galley is L-shaped and is equipped with a two-burner stove, a 26 U.S. gallons (98 L; 22 imp gal) capacity icebox and a single stainless steel sink. A navigation station is opposite the galley, on the port side. The head is located just aft of the navigation station on the port side. The interior woodwork is teak or optionally grey cedar.

The boat has 74 in (188 cm) of standing headroom in the gallery, 73 in (185 cm) in the saloon and 76 in (193 cm) in the bow and aft cabins.

== Variants ==
Sun Odyssey 349 Performance
This model has a deep draft fin keel giving a draft of 6.5 ft (2.0 m). It displaces 11,773 lb (5,340 kg) and carries 3,483 lb (1,580 kg) of cast iron ballast.
Sun Odyssey 349 Shoal Draft
This model has a shoal draft wing keel, giving a draft of 4.92 ft (1.50 m). It displaces 12,390 lb (5,620 kg) and carries 4,101 lb (1,860 kg) of cast iron ballast.
Sun Odyssey 349 Lifting Keel
This model has a shoal draft wing keel, giving a draft of 8.33 ft (2.54 m) with the keel down and 4.08 ft (1.24 m) with it retracted. It displaces 11,684 lb (5,300 kg) and carries 3,377 lb (1,532 kg) of cast iron ballast.

== Operational history ==
In a 2014 review for Sail magazine, Zuzana Prochazka, described its sailing qualities, "this boat likes to sail on the wind sheeted in flat. With 10 knots of true wind at a 40-degree apparent wind angle, we scooted along at 5.3 knots. When the wind inched up to 11 knots and we cracked off to 60 degrees, we bumped up to 6.1 knots. On a broad reach we managed 4.9 knots at 130 degrees in about 9 knots of true. Tacking was easy, and the boat responded quickly."

Zuzana Prochazka also did a 2014 review for boats.com, writing, "the idea with this small model is to attract couples and young families and have them grow with the model line as their sailing experience also grows. Personally, I can also see seasoned couples downsizing from large family cruisers to this more manageable model, which is both less demanding to sail and easier on the wallet."

Yachting Monthly writer Chris Beeson reviewed the design in 2014, stating, "our test sail for Jeanneau’s new Sun Odyssey 349 took place in pretty punchy conditions, gusty with up to 30 knots over the deck upwind. Despite the fact that we had taken in both of the main’s two reefs we were still overpowered but, with the main feathered off and the jib’s leech open, she bounded upwind with great enthusiasm. She would lean on her chines in a gust and just accelerate. Tremendous fun." He concluded, "All in all, the 349 is a gleaming little family cruiser, eager and able to please."

In a 2014 Cruising World photo essay, Billy Black, stated, "the latest in the Sun Odyssey line shares the sleek looks of its siblings but hints at things to come: hard chines that begin forward of the mast; positive sheer for more volume below; a square-top main; and a variety of keel options, including a swing foil for really thin water."

== See also ==
- List of sailing boat types

Similar sailboats

- Beneteau 331
- Beneteau First Class 10
- C&C 34
- C&C 34/36
- Catalina 34
- Coast 34
- Columbia 34
- Columbia 34 Mark II
- Creekmore 34
- Crown 34
- CS 34
- Express 34
- Hunter 34
- San Juan 34
- Sea Sprite 34
- Tartan 34 C
- Tartan 34-2
- Viking 34
