= Catalina 34 =

Sailboat class

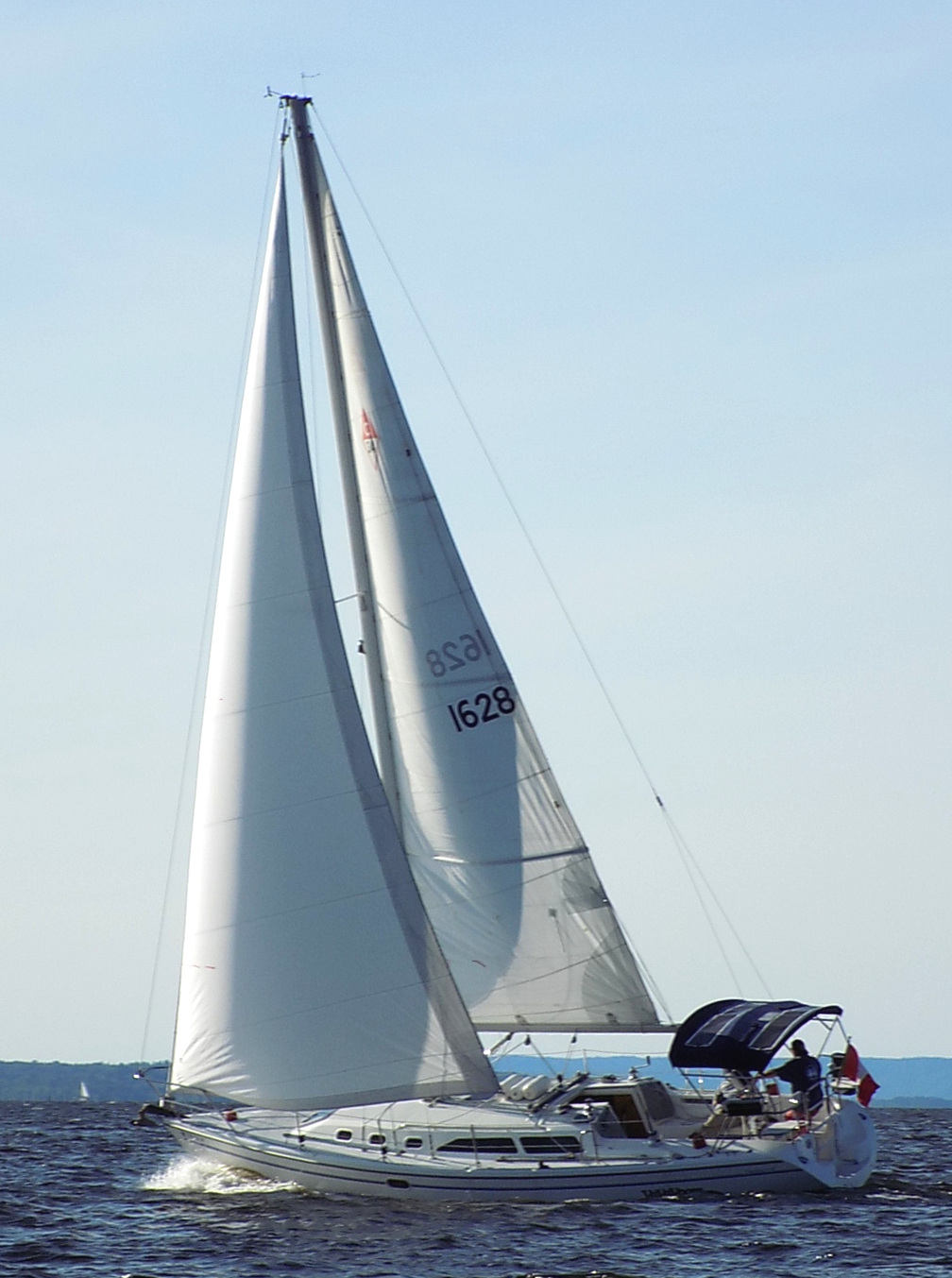

Development
- Designer: Frank V. Butler
- Location: United States
- Year: 1985
- No. built: 1,438
- Builder: Catalina Yachts
- Name: Catalina 34

Boat
- Displacement: 11,950 lb (5,420 kg)
- Draft: 5.58 ft (1.70 m)

Hull
- Type: Monohull
- Construction: Fiberglass
- LOA: 34.50 ft (10.52 m)
- LWL: 29.83 ft (9.09 m)
- Beam: 11.75 ft (3.58 m)
- Engine: Universal diesel engine 21 hp (16 kW)

Hull appendages
- Keel: fin keel
- Ballast: 5,000 lb (2,268 kg)
- Rudder: internally-mounted spade-type rudder

Rig
- General: Masthead sloop
- I foretriangle height: 44.00 ft (13.41 m)
- J foretriangle base: 13.50 ft (4.11 m)
- P mainsail luff: 38.50 ft (11.73 m)
- E mainsail foot: 11.75 ft (3.58 m)

Sails
- Mainsail area: 226.19 sq ft (21.014 m^{2})
- Jib/genoa area: 297.00 sq ft (27.592 m^{2})
- Total sail area: 523.19 sq ft (48.606 m^{2})

Racing
- PHRF: 138 (average)

The Catalina 34 is an American sailboat designed by Frank V. Butler and first built in 1985. The design is out of production.

== Production ==
The boat was built by Catalina Yachts in the United States, which completed 1,438 examples.

== Design ==
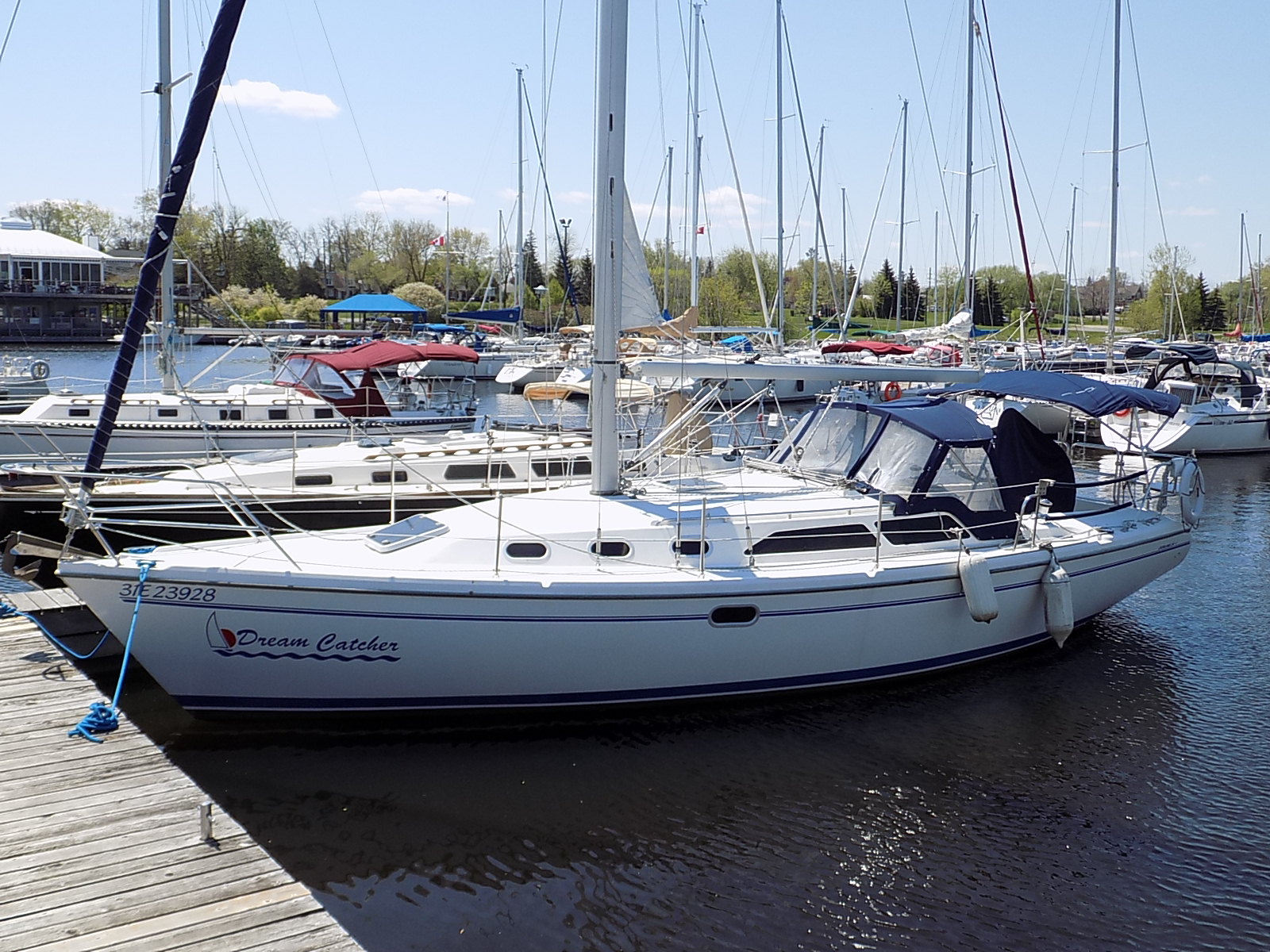
Catalina 34 Mark II

The Catalina 34 is a recreational keelboat, built predominantly of fiberglass, with wood trim. It has a masthead sloop rig, an internally-mounted spade-type rudder and a fixed keel.

The boat has a hull speed of 7.32 kn (13.56 km/h).

== Variants ==
Catalina 34 Mk I
Original model introduced in 1985. It displaces 11,950 lb (5,420 kg) and carries 5,000 lb (2,268 kg) of ballast. The boat has a PHRF racing average handicap of 138 with a high of 153 and low of 114. Boats built from 1985-86 have deck-stepped mast and a Universal diesel engine of 21 hp (16 kW). The boat has a draft of 5.58 ft (1.70 m) with the standard fin keel. Boats built between 1987-1990 have a keel-stepped mast and a Universal 25XP diesel engine of 23 hp (17 kW). Boats built between 1990-1991 have a walk-through transom and a Universal M35 diesel engine of 30 hp (22 kW). The last Mk I models produced resembled the Mk II in configuration.
Catalina 34 SD
Shoal-draft model introduced in 1985, with a draft of 4.7 ft (1.4 m) with a fin keel. It displaces 12,550 lb (5,693 kg). The boat has a PHRF racing average handicap of 150 with a high of 156 and low of 141.
Catalina 34 TM
Tall Mast model introduced in 1985, with a mast about 2 ft (0.6 m) taller and draft of 5.6 ft (1.7 m) with the fin keel. It displaces 11,950 lb (5,420 kg). The boat has a PHRF racing average handicap of 144 with a high of 165 and low of 135.
Catalina 34 WK
Wing Keel model introduced in 1985, with a draft of 3.83 ft (1.17 m) with the wing keel. It displaces 12,550 lb (5,693 kg). The boat has a PHRF racing average handicap of 153 with a high of 159 and low of 150.
Catalina 34 TM WK
Tall Mast and Wing Keel model introduced in 1985, with a mast about 2 ft (0.6 m) taller and draft of 3.83 ft (1.17 m) with the wing keel. It displaces 12,550 lb (5,693 kg). The boat has a PHRF racing average handicap of 150 with a high of 162 and low of 147.
Catalina 34 Mk II
Redesigned model introduced in 1996, with a wider aft deck, a deck stepped mast with compression post and many small refinements. The Mark II is identical at the waterline to permit the boats to be raced against the earlier boats in a one design class. It displaces 11,950 lb (5,420 kg) and carries 5,000 lb (2,268 kg) of ballast. The boat has a draft of 5.58 ft (1.70 m) with the standard fin keel. The Mk II has a PHRF racing average handicap of 153 with a high of 171 and low of 147.

== See also ==
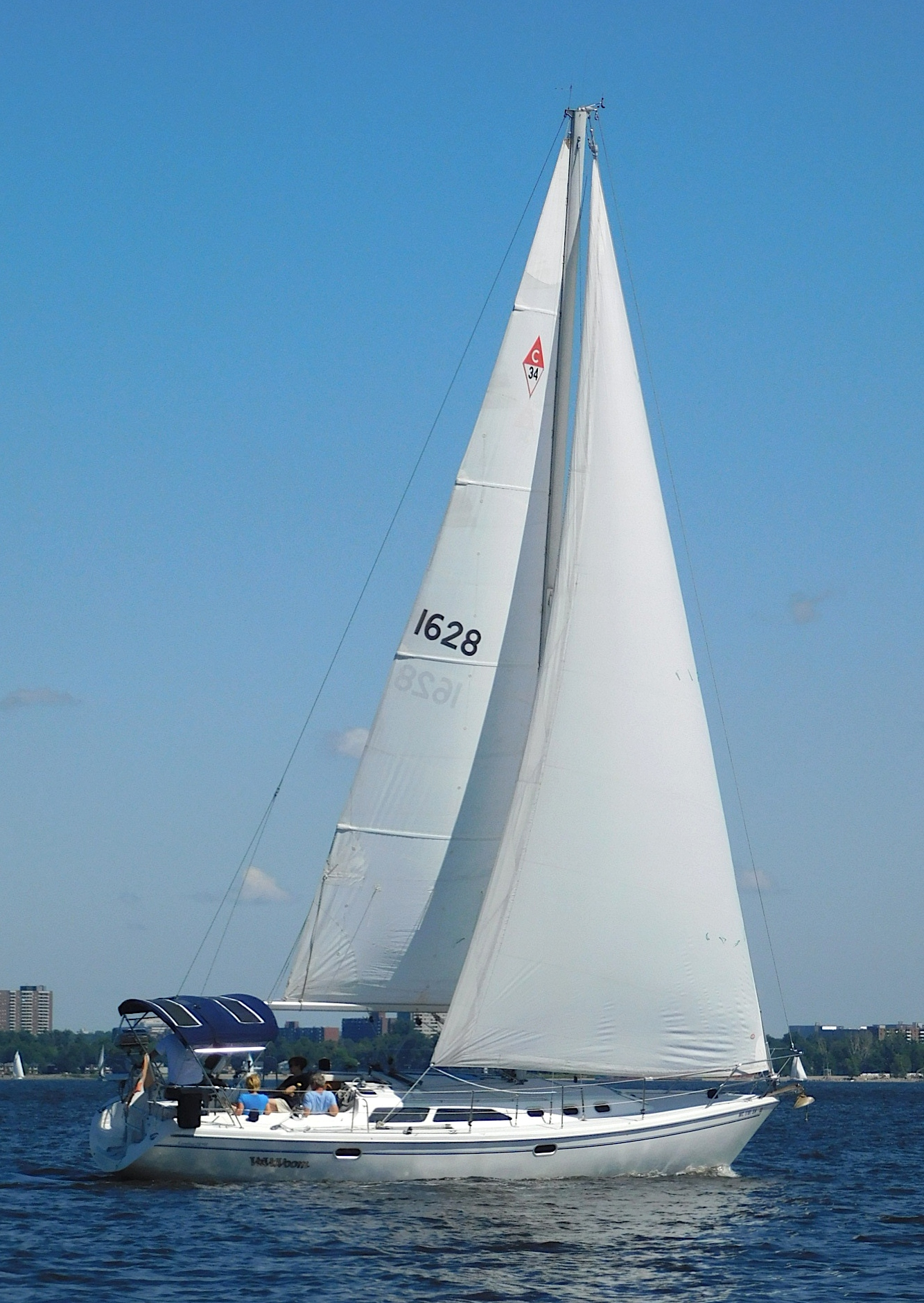
Catalina 34 Mark II

- List of sailing boat types

Similar sailboats

- Beneteau 331
- Beneteau First Class 10
- C&C 34
- C&C 34/36
- Coast 34
- Columbia 34
- Columbia 34 Mark II
- Creekmore 34
- Crown 34
- CS 34
- Express 34
- Hunter 34
- San Juan 34
- Sea Sprite 34
- Sun Odyssey 349
- Tartan 34 C
- Tartan 34-2
- Viking 34
