= Hunter 34 =

Sailboat class

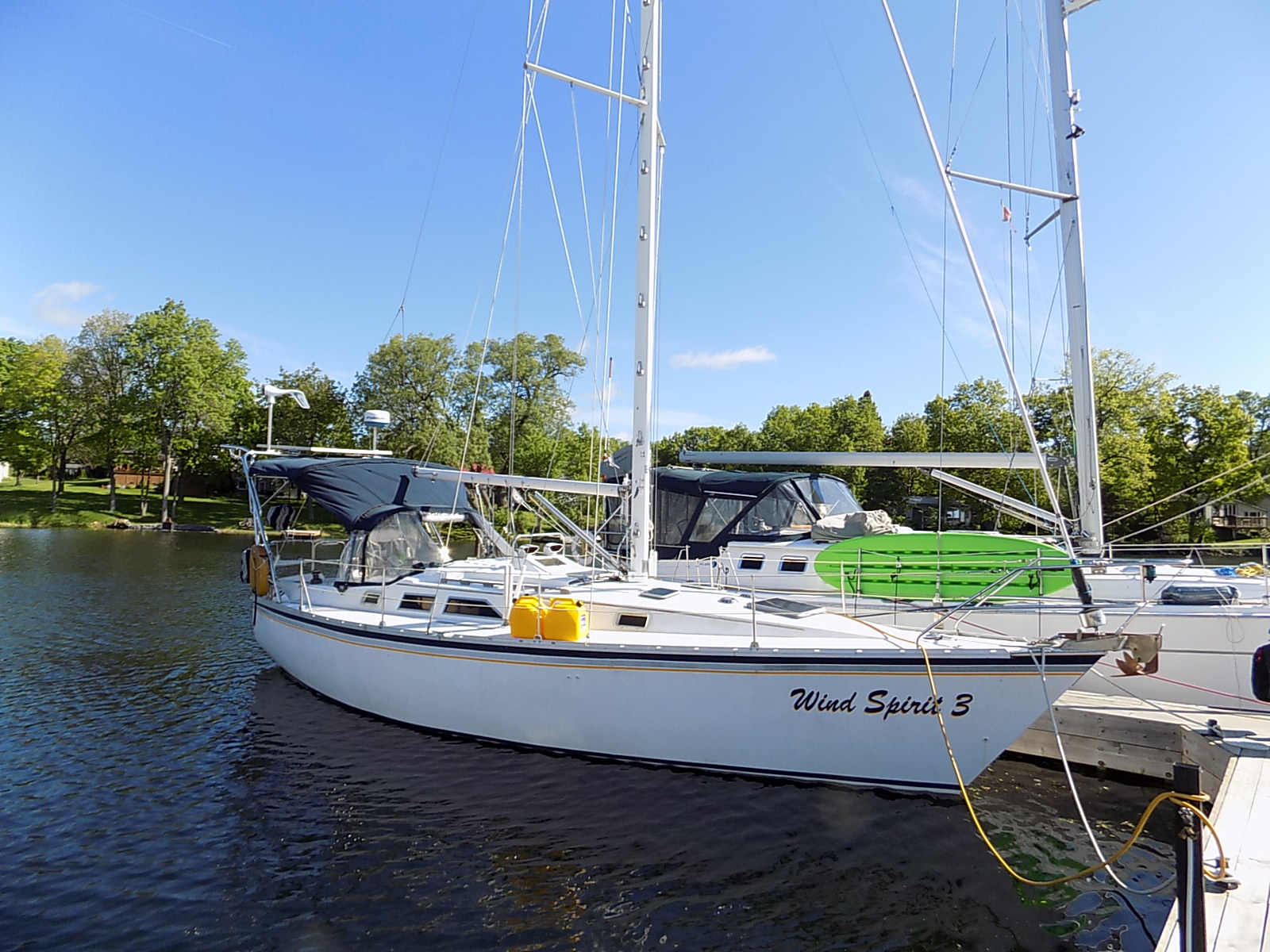

Development
- Designer: Cortland Steck
- Location: United States
- Year: 1983
- Builder: Hunter Marine
- Name: Hunter 34

Boat
- Displacement: 11,820 lb (5,361 kg)
- Draft: 5.50 ft (1.68 m)

Hull
- Type: Monohull
- Construction: Fiberglass
- LOA: 34.42 ft (10.49 m)
- LWL: 28.25 ft (8.61 m)
- Beam: 11.58 ft (3.53 m)
- Engine: Yanmar 3GM diesel engine

Hull appendages
- Keel: fin keel
- Ballast: 5,000 lb (2,268 kg)
- Rudder: internally-mounted spade-type rudder

Rig
- General: Masthead B&R rig
- I foretriangle height: 47.42 ft (14.45 m)
- J foretriangle base: 13.75 ft (4.19 m)
- P mainsail luff: 41.00 ft (12.50 m)
- E mainsail foot: 11.75 ft (3.58 m)

Sails
- Mainsail area: 240.88 sq ft (22.378 m^{2})
- Jib/genoa area: 326.01 sq ft (30.287 m^{2})
- Total sail area: 566.89 sq ft (52.666 m^{2})

Racing
- PHRF: 153 (average)

The Hunter 34 is an American sailboat, that was designed by Cortland Steck.

== Production ==
The boat was built by Hunter Marine in the United States between 1983 and 1987, but it is now out of production.

== Design ==
The Hunter 34 is a small recreational keelboat, built predominantly of fiberglass, with wood trim. It has a masthead B&R rig, an internally-mounted spade-type rudder and a fixed fin keel. It displaces 11,820 lb (5,361 kg) and carries 5,000 lb (2,268 kg) of iron ballast.

The boat has a draft of 5.50 ft (1.68 m) with the standard keel and 4.25 ft (1.30 m) with the optional shoal draft keel. It has a hull speed of 7.12 kn (13.19 km/h).

The boat is fitted with a Japanese Yanmar 3GM diesel engine. The fuel tank holds 25 U.S. gallons (95 L; 21 imp gal) and the fresh water tank has a capacity of 65 U.S. gallons (250 L; 54 imp gal).

== Variants ==
Hunter 34
This model has a full fin keel, giving a draft of 5.50 ft (1.68 m). The boat has a PHRF racing average handicap of 153 with a high of 156 and low of 147.
Hunter 34 SD
This model has a shoal draft keel, giving a draft of 4.25 ft (1.30 m). The boat has a PHRF racing average handicap of 147 with a high of 159 and a low of 135.

== See also ==
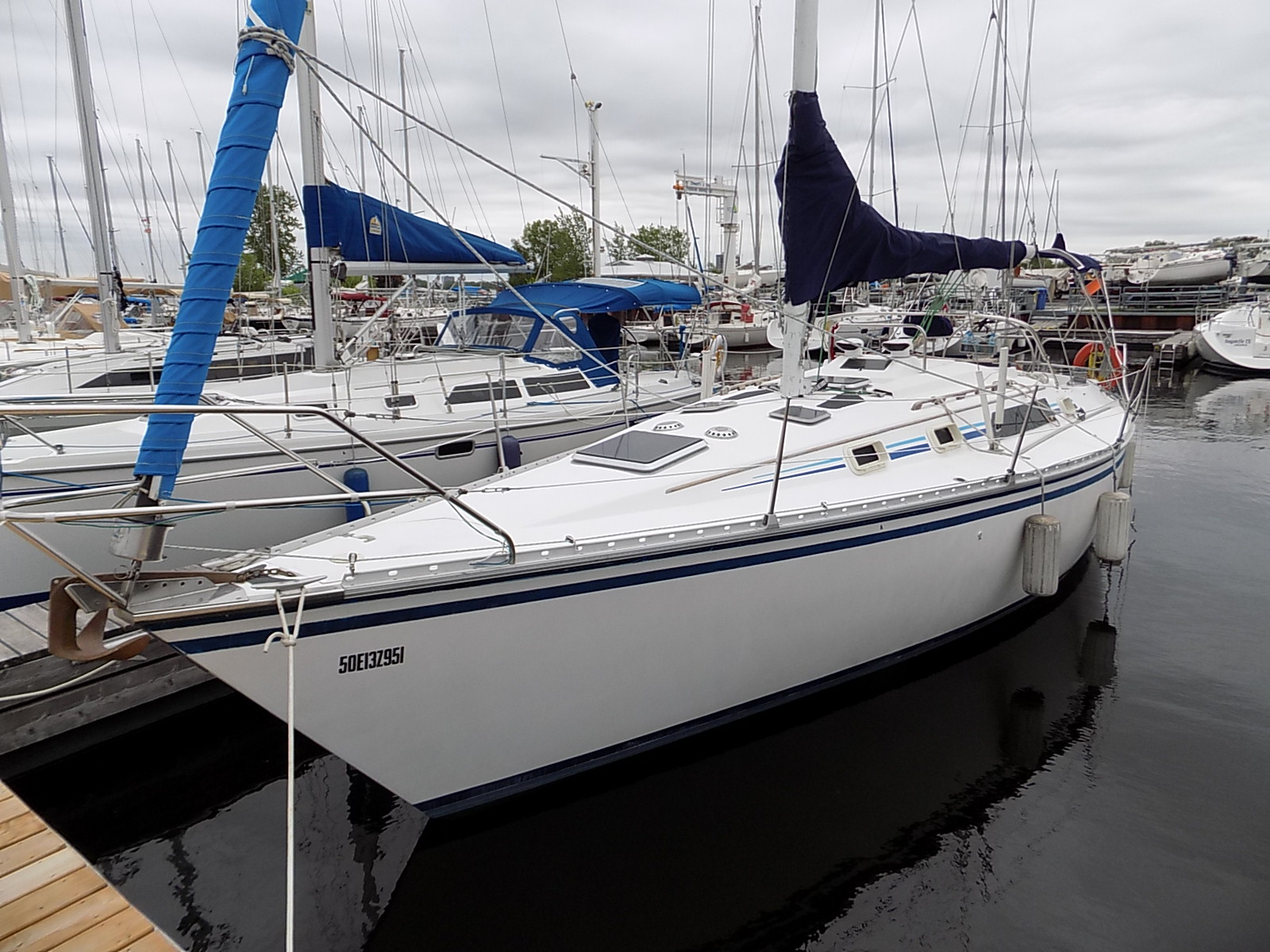
Hunter 34

- List of sailing boat types

Related development

- Hunter 36

Similar sailboats

- Beneteau 331
- Beneteau First Class 10
- C&C 34
- C&C 34/36
- Catalina 34
- Coast 34
- Columbia 34
- Columbia 34 Mark II
- Creekmore 34
- Crown 34
- CS 34
- Express 34
- San Juan 34
- Sea Sprite 34
- Sun Odyssey 349
- Tartan 34 C
- Tartan 34-2
- Viking 34
