= Sea Sprite 34 =

Sailboat class

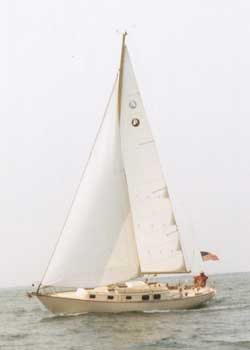

Development
- Designer: Bill Luders
- Location: United States
- Year: 1980
- No. built: 45
- Builder: C. E. Ryder
- Name: Sea Sprite 34

Boat
- Displacement: 12,800 lb (5,806 kg)
- Draft: 5.00 ft (1.52 m)

Hull
- Type: Monohull
- Construction: Fiberglass
- LOA: 33.84 ft (10.31 m)
- LWL: 24.00 ft (7.32 m)
- Beam: 10.25 ft (3.12 m)
- Engine: Universal Motor Company Model 30 25 hp (19 kW) diesel engine

Hull appendages
- Keel: long keel
- Ballast: 5,000 lb (2,268 kg)
- Rudder: keel-mounted rudder

Rig
- Rig type: Bermuda rig
- I foretriangle height: 39.00 ft (11.89 m)
- J foretriangle base: 12.80 ft (3.90 m)
- P mainsail luff: 40.50 ft (12.34 m)
- E mainsail foot: 13.80 ft (4.21 m)

Sails
- Sailplan: Fractional rigged sloop
- Mainsail area: 279.45 sq ft (25.962 m^{2})
- Jib/genoa area: 249.60 sq ft (23.189 m^{2})
- Total sail area: 525.05 sq ft (48.779 m^{2})

The Sea Sprite 34, also called the Luders 34, is an American sailboat that was designed by Bill Luders as a cruiser and first built in 1980.

The design is the largest of the series of Sea Sprite Sailing Yachts.

== Production ==
The design was built by C. E. Ryder in Bristol, Rhode Island, United States. The company completed 45 examples, but it is now out of production.

== Design ==
The Sea Sprite 34 is a recreational keelboat, built predominantly of fiberglass, with wood trim. It has a fractional sloop rig, with a keel-stepped mast, a spooned raked stem, a raised transom, a keel-mounted rudder controlled by a wheel and a fixed long keel. It displaces 12,800 lb (5,806 kg) and carries 5,000 lb (2,268 kg) of lead ballast.

The boat has a draft of 5.00 ft (1.52 m) with the standard long keel fitted.

The boat is fitted with a Universal Motor Company Model 30 diesel engine of 25 hp (19 kW). The fuel tank holds 18 U.S. gallons (68 L; 15 imp gal) and the fresh water tank has a capacity of 50 U.S. gallons (190 L; 42 imp gal).

The boat's galley is located on the port side of the cabin and includes a stainless steel sink and a two-burner stove. The head is located forward, just aft of the bow "V"-berth. Additional sleeping space is provided by the dinette settees. Ventilation is provided by a forward hatch.

The design has a hull speed of 6.57 kn (12.17 km/h).

== See also ==
- List of sailing boat types

Related development

- Sea Sprite 27

Similar sailboats

- Beneteau 331
- Beneteau First Class 10
- C&C 34
- C&C 34/36
- Catalina 34
- Coast 34
- Columbia 34
- Columbia 34 Mark II
- Creekmore 34
- Crown 34
- CS 34
- Express 34
- Hunter 34
- San Juan 34
- S&S 34
- Sun Odyssey 349
- Tartan 34-2
- UFO 34
- Viking 34
