= CS 34 =

Recreational keelboat 1st built 1989

Development
- Designer: Tony Castro
- Location: Canada
- Year: 1989
- Builder: CS Yachts
- Name: CS 34

Boat
- Displacement: 10,500 lb (4,763 kg)
- Draft: 6.25 ft (1.91 m)

Hull
- Type: Monohull
- Construction: Fibreglass
- LOA: 33.50 ft (10.21 m)
- LWL: 27.67 ft (8.43 m)
- Beam: 11.25 ft (3.43 m)
- Engine: Yanmar 2GM20 diesel engine

Hull appendages
- Keel: fin keel
- Rudder: internally-mounted spade-type rudder

Rig
- General: Masthead sloop
- I foretriangle height: 43.00 ft (13.11 m)
- J foretriangle base: 13.50 ft (4.11 m)
- P mainsail luff: 37.40 ft (11.40 m)
- E mainsail foot: 13.00 ft (3.96 m)

Sails
- Mainsail area: 243.10 sq ft (22.585 m^{2})
- Jib/genoa area: 290.25 sq ft (26.965 m^{2})
- Total sail area: 533.35 sq ft (49.550 m^{2})

Racing
- PHRF: 129 (average)

The CS 34 is a recreational keelboat built by CS Yachts in Canada starting in 1989 and now out of production.

It was derived from the MG 335 also designed by Tony Castro. As well as the standard keel, three other keels were available, a shoal draft keel, a winged keel and a semi-elliptical deep-fin version with a terminal weighted bulb. The boat is fitted with a Yanmar 2GM20 diesel engine.

Hull speed is 7.05 kn (13.06 km/h).
