= S2 11.0 =

Sailboat class

S2 11.0 C
Development
- Designer: Arthur Edmunds
- Location: United States
- Year: 1980
- No. built: 66 (plus 156 "A" models)
- Builder: S2 Yachts
- Role: Cruiser
- Name: S2 11.0 C

Boat
- Displacement: 16,000 lb (7,257 kg)
- Draft: 5.50 ft (1.68 m)

Hull
- Type: Monohull
- Construction: Fiberglass
- LOA: 36.00 ft (10.97 m)
- LWL: 28.25 ft (8.61 m)
- Beam: 11.92 ft (3.63 m)
- Engine: Universal 32 hp (24 kW) diesel engine

Hull appendages
- Keel: fin keel
- Ballast: 6,000 lb (2,722 kg)
- Rudder: internally-mounted spade-type rudder

Rig
- Rig type: Bermuda rig
- I foretriangle height: 46.00 ft (14.02 m)
- J foretriangle base: 15.00 ft (4.57 m)
- P mainsail luff: 40.00 ft (12.19 m)
- E mainsail foot: 14.00 ft (4.27 m)

Sails
- Sailplan: Masthead sloop
- Mainsail area: 280.00 sq ft (26.013 m^{2})
- Jib/genoa area: 345.00 sq ft (32.052 m^{2})
- Total sail area: 625.00 sq ft (58.064 m^{2})

The S2 11.0 is a series of American sailboats that was designed by Arthur Edmunds as cruisers and first built in 1977. The designation indicates the approximate length overall in meters.

== Production ==
The series was built by S2 Yachts in Holland, Michigan, United States, between 1977 and 1987, but it is now out of production.

== Design ==
The S2 11.0 is a recreational keelboat, built predominantly of fiberglass, with a balsa-cored deck and wooden trim. It has a masthead sloop rig with aluminum spars, a raked stem, a raised counter reverse transom, an internally mounted spade-type rudder controlled by a wheel and a fixed fin keel.

The boat has a draft of 5.50 ft (1.68 m) with the standard keel and 4.67 ft (1.42 m) with the optional shoal draft keel.

The boat is fitted with a Universal, Volvo, Pathfinder or Yanmar diesel engine for docking and maneuvering. The fuel tank holds 70 U.S. gallons (260 L; 58 imp gal) and the fresh water tank has a capacity of 80 U.S. gallons (300 L; 67 imp gal).

== Variants ==
11.0 A
Aft cockpit model, introduced in 1977 and produced until 1987, with 156 built. It has a length overall of 36.00 ft (11.0 m), a waterline length of 28.25 ft (8.6 m), displaces 15,000 lb (6,804 kg) and carries 6,000 lb (2,722 kg) of ballast.

The sleeping accommodation includes a forward private bow cabin with a "V"-berth and a main cabin settee berth, with a second "U" settee around the fixed dinette table. The galley is aft and on the port side, at the foot of the companionway steps. The gallery has a two-burner, alcohol-fired stove, plus an oven. The head is on the port side, just aft of the bow cabin. There is also a navigation station aft on the starboard side, opposite the galley.

11.0 C
Center cockpit model, introduced in 1980 and produced until 1987, with 66 built. It uses the same hull and sailplan as the "A" model. It has a length overall of 36.00 ft (11.0 m), a waterline length of 28.25 ft (8.6 m), displaces 16,000 lb (7,257 kg) and carries 6,000 lb (2,722 kg) of ballast.

The accommodation includes an aft private cabin, a forward private bow cabin with louvred doors and "V"-berth and two main cabin settee berths around the drop-leaf table. It has sleeping accommodation for six people. The main salon seating area is forward, with the galley aft, on the port side. The gallery has a two-burner, alcohol-fired stove, plus an oven. The head is on the starboard side, opposite the galley, with the companionway steps from the overhead cockpit in between the head and galley. The head includes a shower and bathtub, with pressurized water. There is also a navigation station to starboard, with a seat that swings away over the starboard settee, when not in use. Ventilation is provided by two large windows, two dorade vents and two acrylic hatches. The bow includes a self-draining anchor locker.

For sailing there are two primary winches mounted to the cockpit coamings, plus two halyard winches forward on the cabin roof. The genoa has an adjustable track. The mainsail boom has a 5:1 mechanical advantage outhaul and internal double reefing.

== Operational history ==
In a 1994 review of the 11.0 C Richard Sherwood wrote, "the 11.0 C model ... has the same underwater lines as the 11.0 A. There is substantial weight and a broad beam for stability. The deep keel and rudder help track off the wind. The center cockpit has become very popular for cruisers, and the 11.0 has a big one."

== See also ==
- List of sailing boat types

Similar sailboats

- C&C 36-1
- C&C 36R
- Catalina 36
- Columbia 36
- Coronado 35
- Crealock 37
- CS 36
- Ericson 36
- Frigate 36
- Hinterhoeller F3
- Hunter 36
- Hunter 36-2
- Hunter 36 Legend
- Hunter 36 Vision
- Invader 36
- Islander 36
- Nonsuch 36
- Portman 36
- Seidelmann 37
- Vancouver 36 (Harris)
- Watkins 36
- Watkins 36C
