= Watkins 36 =

Sailboat class

Development
- Designer: William H. Tripp Jr and Watkins brothers
- Location: United States
- Year: 1981
- Builder: Watkins Yachts
- Name: Watkins 36

Boat
- Displacement: 17,000 lb (7,711 kg)
- Draft: 4.50 ft (1.37 m)

Hull
- Type: Monohull
- Construction: Fiberglass
- LOA: 36.00 ft (10.97 m)
- LWL: 29.33 ft (8.94 m)
- Beam: 10.50 ft (3.20 m)
- Engine: Perkins Engines 40 hp (30 kW) diesel engine

Hull appendages
- Keel: fin keel
- Ballast: 6,000 lb (2,722 kg)
- Rudder: skeg-mounted rudder

Rig
- Rig type: Bermuda rig
- I foretriangle height: 40.50 ft (12.34 m)
- J foretriangle base: 14.00 ft (4.27 m)
- P mainsail luff: 35.00 ft (10.67 m)
- E mainsail foot: 14.00 ft (4.27 m)

Sails
- Sailplan: Masthead sloop
- Mainsail area: 245.00 sq ft (22.761 m^{2})
- Jib/genoa area: 283.50 sq ft (26.338 m^{2})
- Total sail area: 528.50 sq ft (49.099 m^{2})

The Watkins 36, also known as the W36 and W36AC (for "aft-cockpit"), is an American sailboat that was designed by William H. Tripp Jr and the Watkins brothers, first built in 1981.

The Watkins 36 is a development of the Portman 36 and was developed into the center cockpit Watkins 36C.

== Development ==
The silent partner in Auroraglas purchased the rights to the center-cockpit Tripp-designed Coronado 35 and Columbia 36 designs from Columbia Yachts and the tooling was modified to become the aft-cockpit Portman 36. That design was produced by Auroraglas and then Watkins Yachts, in Clearwater, Florida, United States after the companies were merged. The Portman 36 was then modified by Watkins to become the aft-cockpit Watkins 36 and finally developed into the center-cockpit Watkins 36C.

== Production ==
The Watkins 36 was produced by Watkins Yachts from 1981 to 1983. Lasting only 2 years.

During its production run the Watkins 36 became the flagship of the company product line and its features were incorporated in the newer and smaller boat designs that followed it, including the opening ports, Bomar hatches, through bolted flanged hull joints and the sloping cabin top.

== Design ==
The Watkins 36 is a recreational keelboat, built predominantly of fiberglass, with teak wood trim. It has a masthead sloop rig, a raked stem, a raised transom, a skeg-mounted rudder controlled by a wheel and a fixed fin keel. It displaces 17,000 lb (7,711 kg) and carries 6,000 lb (2,722 kg) of ballast.

The design's hull is molded in a single piece using polyester resin and fiberglass woven roving, as well as multidirectional chopped strand fibers (MSCF). The keel is integral to the hull and the ballast is internal to the keel. The deck and the cockpit are also moulded in one piece, also using polyester resin and fiberglass woven roving with MCSF. Plywood coring is employed for the cabin top, deck, seat and the cockpit sole for stiffness. The hull-to-deck joint is flanged, glued and then screwed into place. There is an aluminum toe rail, stainless steel through-bolted into place, bonding the toe rail, deck and the hull.

An anchor well is located at the bow with a hawspipe leading the anchor chain into the "V" berth locker.

The boat has a draft of 4.50 ft (1.37 m) with the standard keel fitted.

The boat is fitted with a British Perkins Engines diesel engine of 40 hp (30 kW) for docking and maneuvering. The fuel tank holds 40 U.S. gallons (150 L; 33 imp gal) and the fresh water tank has a capacity of 60 U.S. gallons (230 L; 50 imp gal). Later boats delivered had 50 hp (37 kW).

The boat was factory delivered with many equipment items as standard, including a pressurized water system, a shower, ten opening ports and two hatches, a folding dining table in the main cabin and provisions for shore power. The design layout has a bow "V" berth and an owner's stateroom aft. The galley is located aft, in the passageway to the owner's state room and is fitted with a double sink, a 12 volt refrigerator and a three-burner propane-fired stove with an oven. The head is aft and accessible from stateroom and the main cabin. The main cabin has 75 in (191 cm) of headroom and is finished with hand-rubbed teak trim, with the bulkheads and cabinetry made from teak veneer on plywood. The early boats delivered had a carpeted main cabin sole, with later deliveries with a teak and holly veneer sole over plywood. The companionway stairs tip up, providing access to the engine.

The design has a hull speed of 7.26 kn (13.45 km/h).

== Operational history ==
The boat is supported by an active class club, the Watkins Owners.

== See also ==
- List of sailing boat types

Related development

- Portman 36
- Watkins 36C

Similar sailboats

- Bayfield 36
- Beneteau 361
- C&C 36-1
- C&C 36R
- Catalina 36
- Crealock 37
- CS 36
- Ericson 36
- Frigate 36
- Hinterhoeller F3
- Hunter 36
- Hunter 36-2
- Hunter 36 Legend
- Hunter 36 Vision
- Invader 36
- Islander 36
- Nonsuch 36
- S2 11.0
- Seidelmann 37
- Vancouver 36 (Harris)
