= Portman 36 =

Sailboat class

Development
- Location: United States
- Year: 1978
- No. built: 19
- Builders: Auroraglas; Watkins Yachts
- Name: Portman 36

Boat
- Displacement: 16,000 lb (7,257 kg)
- Draft: 4.50 ft (1.37 m)

Hull
- Type: Monohull
- Construction: Fiberglass
- LOA: 36.00 ft (10.97 m)
- LWL: 29.33 ft (8.94 m)
- Beam: 10.50 ft (3.20 m)
- Engine: 40 hp (30 kW) diesel engine

Hull appendages
- Keel: fin keel
- Ballast: 6,000 lb (2,722 kg)
- Rudder: skeg-mounted rudder

Rig
- Rig type: Bermuda rig

Sails
- Sailplan: Masthead sloop
- Total sail area: 545 sq ft (50.6 m^{2})

The Portman 36 is an American sailboat that was first built in 1978.

== Development and production ==
The silent partner in Auroraglas purchased the rights to the center-cockpit Coronado 35/Columbia 36 design from Columbia Yachts and the tooling was modified to become the aft-cockpit Portman 36. Other modifications included relocating the ports from the hull to a newly designed coach house and designing a new hull-to-deck joint.

The design was built by Auroraglas and later by Watkins Yachts in Clearwater, Florida, United States after the acquisition of Watkins and its merger with Auroraglas. A total of 19 boats were produced, with Auroraglas only building one or two of them, before production moved to Watkins.

The design was developed into the Watkins 36 and the Watkins 36C in 1981

== Design ==
The Portman 36 is a recreational keelboat, built predominantly of fiberglass, with wood trim. It has a masthead sloop rig, a raked stem, a raised transom, a skeg-mounted spade-type/transom-hung rudder controlled by a wheel and a fixed fin keel. It displaces 16,000 lb (7,257 kg) and carries 6,000 lb (2,722 kg) of ballast.

The boat has a draft of 4.50 ft (1.37 m) with the standard keel fitted.

The boat is fitted with a diesel engine of 40 hp (30 kW) for docking and maneuvering. The fuel tank holds 60 U.S. gallons (230 L; 50 imp gal).

The design has a hull speed of 7.26 kn (13.45 km/h).

== Operational history ==
The boat is supported by an active class club, the Watkins Owners.

== See also ==
- List of sailing boat types

Related development

- Watkins 36
- Watkins 36C

Similar sailboats

- Bayfield 36
- Beneteau 361
- C&C 36-1
- C&C 36R
- Catalina 36
- Crealock 37
- CS 36
- Ericson 36
- Frigate 36
- Hinterhoeller F3
- Hunter 36
- Hunter 36-2
- Hunter 36 Legend
- Hunter 36 Vision
- Invader 36
- Islander 36
- Nonsuch 36
- S2 11.0
- Seidelmann 37
- Vancouver 36 (Harris)
