= Y Flyer =

Sailboat class

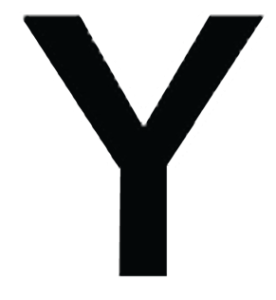

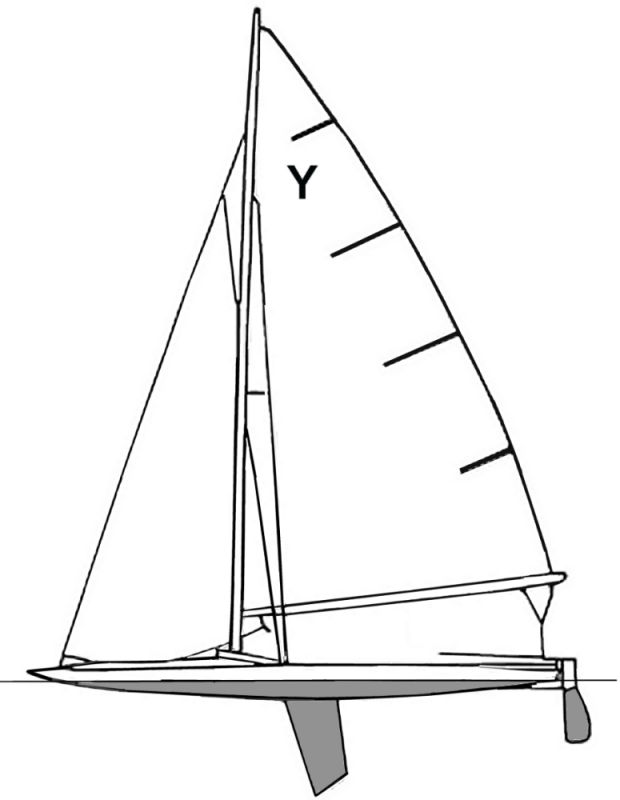

Development
- Designer: Alvin Youngquist
- Location: United States
- Year: 1938
- No. built: 2,770
- Builders: Jack A. Helms Co. Jibetech; Turner Marine; Hinterhoeller Limited
- Name: Y Flyer

Boat
- Crew: two
- Displacement: 500 lb (227 kg)
- Draft: 4.00 ft (1.22 m) with centerboard down

Hull
- Type: monohull scow
- Construction: wood or fiberglass
- LOA: 18.17 ft (5.54 m)
- LWL: 14.50 ft (4.42 m)
- Beam: 5.67 ft (1.73 m)

Hull appendages
- Keel: centerboard
- Rudder: transom-mounted rudder

Rig
- Rig type: Bermuda rig

Sails
- Sailplan: fractional rigged sloop
- Mainsail area: 110 sq ft (10 m^{2})
- Jib/genoa area: 51 sq ft (4.7 m^{2})
- Total sail area: 161 sq ft (15.0 m^{2})

Racing
- D-PN: 88.1

The Y Flyer is an American sailing dinghy that was designed by Alvin Youngquist in 1938 as a one-design racer and first built in 1941.

== Production ==
The boat design was first shown in The Rudder magazine in 1938, as plans for amateur construction. Homebuilding of the boat from spruce and plywood continued after fiberglass boats were commercially available.

The design was built by Jack A. Helms Co., Jibetech and more recently, by Turner Marine in the United States, but it is now out of production.

George Hinterhoeller was establishing his boat building enterprise Hinterhoeller Limited in 1956, in Niagara Falls, Ontario, Canada. He built 40 Y-Flyers as his first production boat, "before the market dried up".

== Design ==
The Y Flyer is a recreational sailboat, initially built predominantly of wood, later versions were constructed of fiberglass, with wood trim. It has a flexible fractional sloop rig with wooden or aluminum spars and a rotating mast. The hull is a scow design, with a flat bottom, a reverse sheer and a hard hull chine. The hull features a vertical transom, a transom-hung rudder controlled by a tiller and a retractable steel or aluminum centerboard. It displaces 500 lb (227 kg).

The boat has a draft of 4.00 ft (1.22 m) with the centerboard extended and 6 in (15 cm) with it retracted, allowing beaching or ground transportation on a trailer.

For sailing the boat has a mainsheet traveler. It may also be optionally equipped with built-in suction bailers, barber haulers, transom flaps and hiking straps. The class rules in the United States prohibit spinnakers, but these are used for racing in Canada.

The design has a Portsmouth Yardstick racing average handicap of 88.1 and is normally raced with a crew of two sailors.

== Operational history ==
The design is a supported by an active class club, the Y-Flyer Yacht Racing Association, that organizes races and regulates the boat design.

By 1994 there were Canadian fleets in Alberta, Manitoba, Ontario and Quebec. American fleets were located in Indiana, Illinois, Ohio, Missouri, Georgia and South Carolina. There were also fleets in the US northeast and on the Pacific coast.

In a 1994 review Richard Sherwood wrote, "The Y Flyer has a hard chine and flat bottom and is unusually stable. A slight heel reduces wetted surface dramatically, however, as may be seen from the [Portsmouth] rating."

== See also ==
- List of sailing boat types
