= Shark 24 =

Canadian-designed 24 ft sailing yacht

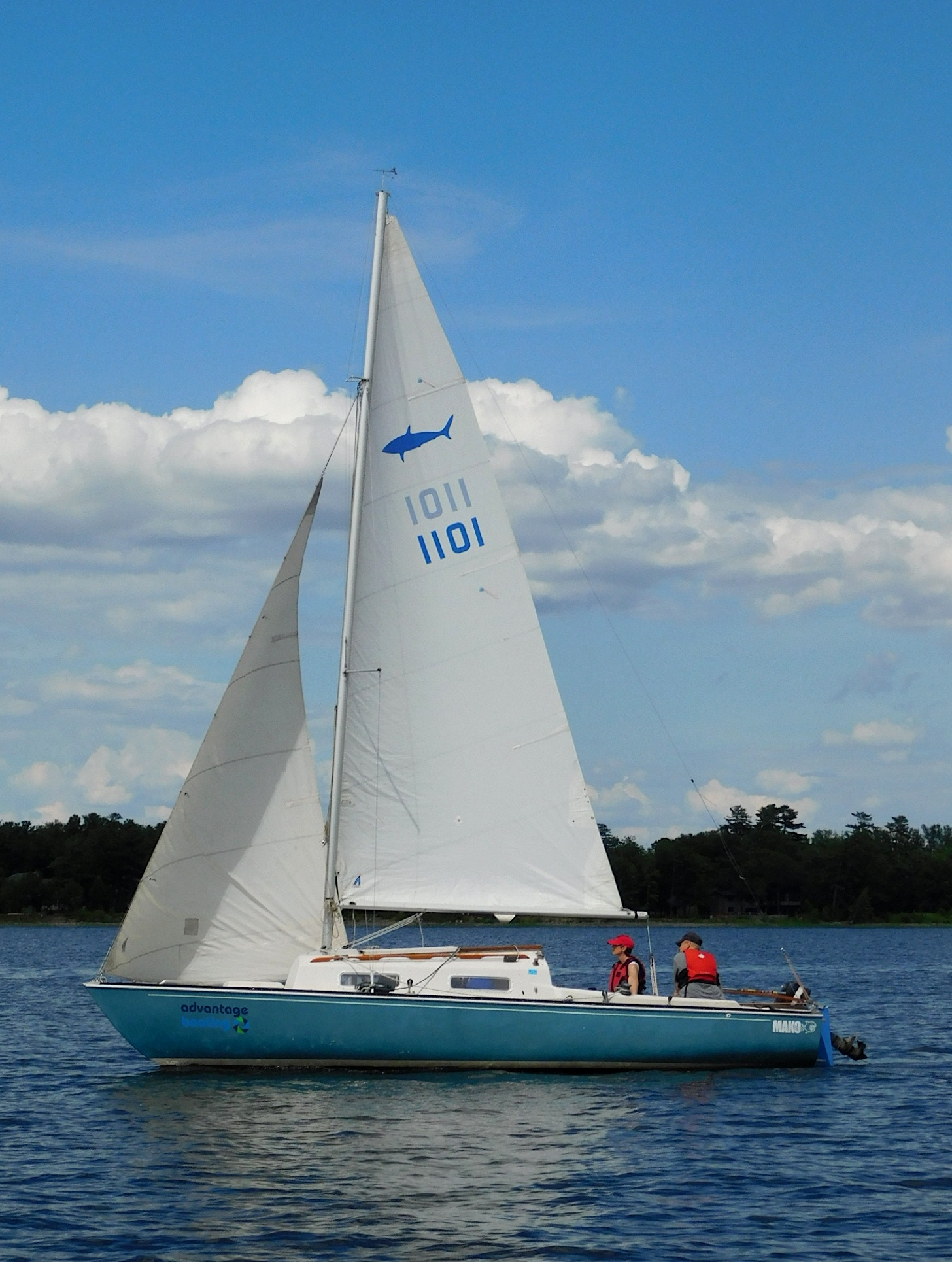

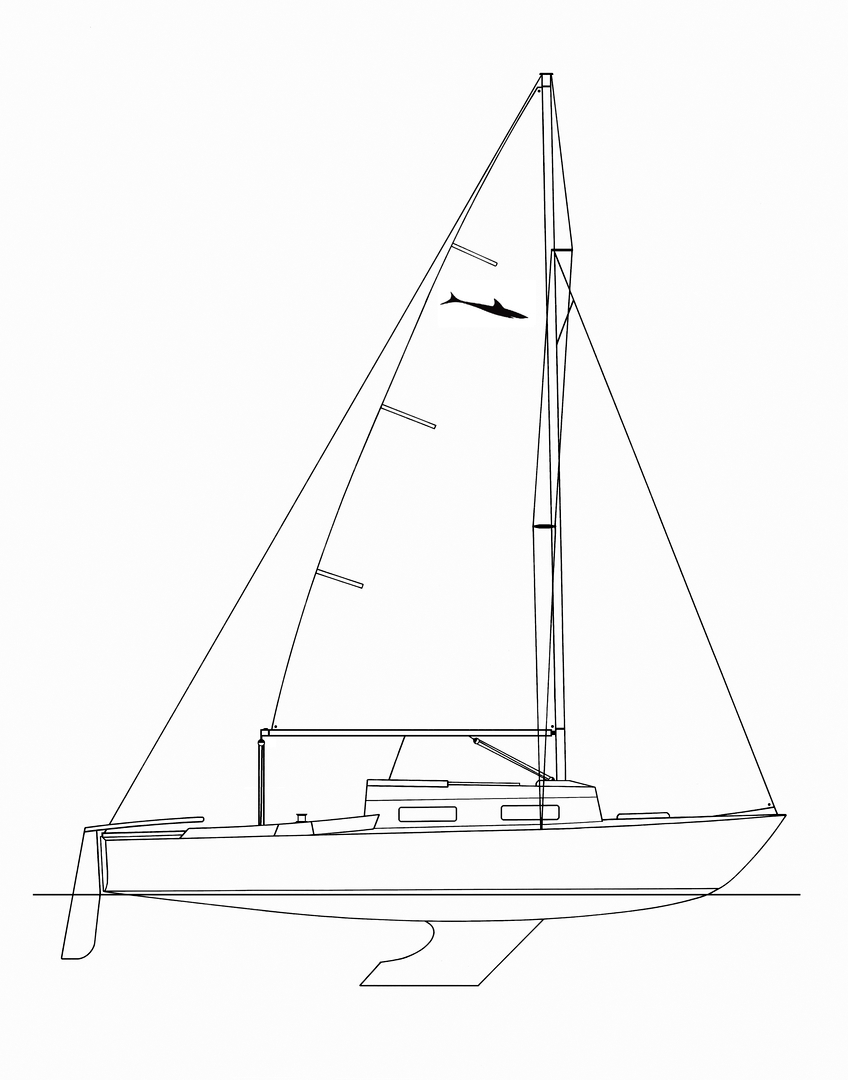

Development
- Designer: George Hinterhoeller
- Location: Niagara-on-the-Lake, Ontario
- Year: 1959
- No. built: over 2500
- Design: One-Design
- Builders: Hinterhoeller Limited; C&C Yachts; Halman Manufacturing Co. Bodo Guenther Marinedepot* (*current builder)
- Role: racer, recreational sailing

Boat
- Crew: 2 to 3
- Displacement: 2,100 lb (950 kg)
- Draft: 3 ft 2 in (0.97 m)

Hull
- Type: monohull
- Construction: Fibre-reinforced plastic
- LOA: 24 ft (7.3 m)
- LWL: 20 ft (6.1 m)
- Beam: 6 ft 10 in (2.08 m)
- Engine: 3–6 hp (2.2–4.5 kW)

Hull appendages
- Keel: fixed fin
- Ballast: iron 675 lb (306 kg)
- Rudder: transom hung spade

Rig
- Rig type: bermuda rig
- I foretriangle height: 20 ft (6.1 m)
- J foretriangle base: 7.3 ft (2.2 m)
- P mainsail luff: 23 ft (7.0 m)
- E mainsail foot: 10.2 ft (3.1 m)

Sails
- Sailplan: fractional sloop
- Mainsail area: 117.3 sq ft (10.90 m^{2})
- Jib/genoa area: 73 sq ft (6.8 m^{2})
- Upwind sail area: 190 sq ft (18 m^{2})

The Shark 24 is a 24-foot sailing yacht designed in Canada by George Hinterhoeller in 1959. It is used for cruising and racing in North America and Central Europe.

The Shark 24 was awarded International status by World Sailing in 2000.

== History ==
George Hinterhoeller grew up in Austria where he sailed the light displacement fin keel sailboats that were common there. By 1959 he had emigrated to Canada and was working for a boat builder in Niagara-on-the-Lake, Ontario. Hinterhoeller decided to design and build a sailboat for himself that was similar to what he had sailed in his youth in Austria. The result was a 22 ft (6.7 m) plywood boat he named Teeter Totter. Other sailors saw the resulting boat, and how fast it sailed compared to the heavy displacement boats common on the Great Lakes at the time and asked Hinterhoeller to build similar boats for them. Hinterhoeller modified the design, stretching it out to 24 ft (7.3 m) and started production of what he then called the Shark. The customer who commissioned the fifth hull requested it be built in fibreglass and offered to help Hinterhoeller build it using this new material. The resulting boat was a success and all subsequent Sharks produced were built in fibreglass as this resulted in a lighter boat that took far less time to build so was less expensive and required much less ongoing maintenance.

== Design ==
The Shark is a light displacement cruising and racing sailboat. It has a 7/8 fractional sloop rig, a small cabin and a self-bailing cockpit. The iron fin keel, combined with a transom hung spade rudder, and a flat run aft allows the hull to ride up on its bow wave and plane under the right conditions, giving the Shark more speed than a displacement hull of the same waterline length. It had a displacement-length ratio of 123, extraordinarily low for its time.

The Shark has a V-berth, two quarter berths, and a small galley with sink, stove and icebox. It has sitting headroom under the small deckhouse.

== World Championship ==
A World Championship Regatta for the Shark 24 class has been continuously contested for over 50 years. The regatta follows a three-year rotation where for two consecutive years the regatta is hosted by the Canadian Shark Class Association in Canada, and the third year it is held in Europe in Austria, Germany, or Switzerland.
