= Watkins 36C =

Sailboat class

Development
- Designer: William H. Tripp Jr and Watkins brothers
- Location: United States
- Year: 1981
- No. built: 58
- Builder: Watkins Yachts
- Name: Watkins 36C

Boat
- Displacement: 17,000 lb (7,711 kg)
- Draft: 4.50 ft (1.37 m)

Hull
- Type: Monohull
- Construction: Fiberglass
- LOA: 36.00 ft (10.97 m)
- LWL: 29.33 ft (8.94 m)
- Beam: 10.50 ft (3.20 m)
- Engine: Perkins Engines 40 hp (30 kW) diesel engine

Hull appendages
- Keel: fin keel
- Ballast: 6,000 lb (2,722 kg)
- Rudder: skeg-mounted rudder

Rig
- Rig type: Bermuda rig
- I foretriangle height: 40.50 ft (12.34 m)
- J foretriangle base: 14.00 ft (4.27 m)
- P mainsail luff: 35.00 ft (10.67 m)
- E mainsail foot: 14.00 ft (4.27 m)

Sails
- Sailplan: Masthead sloop
- Mainsail area: 245.00 sq ft (22.761 m^{2})
- Jib/genoa area: 283.50 sq ft (26.338 m^{2})
- Total sail area: 528.50 sq ft (49.099 m^{2})

The Watkins 36C, also known as the W36C, is an American sailboat that was designed by William H. Tripp Jr and the Watkins brothers. It was first built in 1981.

The Watkins 36C is a center-cockpit development of the aft-cockpit Watkins 36.

== Development ==
The silent partner in Auroraglas purchased the rights to the center-cockpit Tripp-designed Coronado 35 and Columbia 36 designs from Columbia Yachts and the tooling was modified to become the aft-cockpit Portman 36. That design was produced by Auroraglas and then by Watkins Yachts, in Clearwater, Florida, United States after the companies were merged. The Portman 36 was then modified by Watkins to become the aft-cockpit Watkins 36 and finally developed into the center-cockpit Watkins 36C.

A history of Watkins Yachts notes, "in 1981 a center cockpit version of the W36 was added to the line. This is ironic as the W36 started life as a Coronado 35 center cockpit modified by giving it a new deck/coach roof to become an aft cockpit. The original Columbia center cockpit design was very dated so a new from scratch deck & coach roof mold was designed."

== Production ==
The Watkins 36C was produced from 1981 to 1984, with 58 boats completed.

During its production run the Watkins 36 and 36C became the flagships of the company product line and their features were incorporated in the newer and smaller boat designs that followed it, including the opening ports, Bomar hatches, through bolted flanged hull joints and the sloping cabin top.

== Design ==
The Watkins 36C is a recreational keelboat, built predominantly of fiberglass, with teak wood trim. It has a masthead sloop rig, a raked stem, a raised transom, a skeg-mounted rudder controlled by a wheel and a fixed fin keel. It displaces 17,000 lb (7,711 kg) and carries 6,000 lb (2,722 kg) of ballast.

The design's hull is molded in a single piece using polyester resin and fiberglass woven roving, as well as multidirectional chopped strand fibers (MSCF). The keel is integral to the hull and the ballast is internal to the keel. The deck and the cockpit and also moulded in pone piece, also using polyester resin and fiberglass woven roving with MCSF. Plywood coring is employed for the cabin top, deck, seat and the cockpit sole for stiffness. The hull-to-deck joint is flanged, glued and then screwed into place. There is an aluminum toe rail, stainless steel through-bolted into place, bonding the toe rail, deck and the hull.

An anchor well is located at the bow with a hawspipe leading the anchor chain into the "V" berth locker.

The boat has a draft of 4.50 ft (1.37 m) with the standard keel fitted.

The boat is fitted with a British Perkins Engines diesel engine of 40 hp (30 kW), or on later boats delivered 50 hp (37 kW), for docking and maneuvering. The companionway stairs may be removed to provide access to the engine. The fuel tank holds 40 U.S. gallons (150 L; 33 imp gal) and the fresh water tank has a capacity of 85 U.S. gallons (320 L; 71 imp gal).

The boat was factory delivered with many equipment items as standard, including a pressurized water system, a shower, ten opening ports and two hatches, a folding dining table in the main cabin and provisions for shore power. The design layout is the same as the Watkins 36 and has a bow "V" berth and an owner's stateroom aft. The galley is located aft, in the passageway to the owner's state room and is fitted with a double sink, a 12 volt refrigerator and a three-burner propane-fired stove with an oven. The head is aft and accessible from stateroom and the main cabin. The main cabin has 75 in (191 cm) of headroom and is finished with hand-rubbed teak trim, with the bulkheads and cabinetry made from teak veneer on plywood. The early boats delivered had a carpeted main cabin sole, with later deliveries with a teak and holly veneer sole over plywood.

The design has a hull speed of 7.26 kn (13.45 km/h).

== Operational history ==
The boat is supported by an active class club, the Watkins Owners.

== See also ==
- List of sailing boat types

Related development

- Portman 36
- Watkins 36

Similar sailboats

- Bayfield 36
- Beneteau 361
- C&C 36-1
- C&C 36R
- Catalina 36
- Crealock 37
- CS 36
- Ericson 36
- Frigate 36
- Hinterhoeller F3
- Hunter 36
- Hunter 36-2
- Hunter 36 Legend
- Hunter 36 Vision
- Invader 36
- Islander 36
- Nonsuch 36
- S2 11.0
- Seidelmann 37
- Vancouver 36 (Harris)
