= Sail area-displacement ratio =

Calculation used to estimate how much sail a boat carries relative to its weight

The sail area-displacement ratio (SA/D) is a calculation used to express how much sail a boat carries relative to its weight.

$$\mathit{SA/D} = \frac{\mathit{Sail Area}(\text{ft}^2)} {[\mathit{Displacement}(\text{lb})/64]^{\frac{2}{3}}} = \frac{\mathit{Sail Area}(\text{m}^2)} {\mathit{Displacement}(\text{m}^3)^{\frac{2}{3}}}$$

In the first equation, the denominator in pounds is divided by 64 to convert it to cubic feet (because 1 cubic foot of salt water weights 64 pounds). The denominator is taken to the 2/3 power to make the entire metric unit-less (without this, the denominator is in cubic feet, and the numerator is in square feet).

It is an indicator of the performance of a boat. The higher the SA/D, the more lively the boat's sailing performance:

| Boat Type | SA/D |
|---|---|
| Motorsailers | 13 - 14 |
| Slow auxiliary sailboats | 14 - 15 |
| Average offshore cruisers | 15 - 16 |
| Coastal cruisers | 16 - 17 |
| Racing yachts | 17 - 19 |
| Ultra light racers, class racers, daysailers | 20+ |

The SA/D, however, does not provide information about a boat behavior in a storm or upwind. A polar diagram from a velocity prediction program gives a more precise view.

== See also ==
- Displacement–length ratio
