= Ericson 36 =

Sailboat class

Development
- Designer: Ron Holland
- Location: United States
- Year: 1980
- No. built: 32
- Builder: Ericson Yachts
- Role: Racer
- Name: Ericson 36

Boat
- Displacement: 11,600 lb (5,262 kg)
- Draft: 6.25 ft (1.91 m)

Hull
- Type: Monohull
- Construction: Fiberglass
- LOA: 35.58 ft (10.84 m)
- LWL: 29.00 ft (8.84 m)
- Beam: 11.83 ft (3.61 m)
- Engine: Universal M-25 24 hp (18 kW) diesel engine

Hull appendages
- Keel: fin keel
- Ballast: 5,230 lb (2,372 kg)
- Rudder: internally-mounted spade-type rudder

Rig
- Rig type: Bermuda rig
- I foretriangle height: 47.75 ft (14.55 m)
- J foretriangle base: 14.50 ft (4.42 m)
- P mainsail luff: 42.00 ft (12.80 m)
- E mainsail foot: 12.00 ft (3.66 m)

Sails
- Sailplan: Masthead sloop
- Mainsail area: 252.00 sq ft (23.412 m^{2})
- Jib/genoa area: 346.19 sq ft (32.162 m^{2})
- Total sail area: 598.19 sq ft (55.574 m^{2})

Racing
- PHRF: 108 (average)

The Ericson 36 is an American sailboat that was designed by Ron Holland as a racer and first built in 1980.

The Ericson 36 is often confused with a completely different 1975 design, the Ericson 36C.

== Production ==
The design was built by Ericson Yachts in the United States. The company completed 32 examples between 1980 and 1984, but it is now out of production.

== Design ==
The Ericson 36 is a recreational keelboat, built predominantly of fiberglass, with wood trim. It has a masthead sloop rig, a raked stem, a reverse transom, an internally mounted spade-type rudder controlled by a wheel and a fixed fin keel. It displaces 11,600 lb (5,262 kg) and carries 5,230 lb (2,372 kg) of ballast.

The boat has a draft of 6.25 ft (1.91 m) with the standard keel fitted.

The Ericson 36 is fitted with a Universal M-25 diesel engine of 24 hp (18 kW) for docking and maneuvering. The fuel tank holds 50 U.S. gallons (190 L; 42 imp gal) and the fresh water tank has a capacity of 70 U.S. gallons (260 L; 58 imp gal).

The design has a notably straight deck sheer line.

Sleeping accommodation for seven is provided and includes a bow "V"-berth, two main cabin double settee berths and an aft pilot berth. The galley is located at the foot of the companionway steps, on the port side and includes a two-burner, alcohol-fired stove. The sink has both pressurized water and foot-pump fresh and salt water. A navigation station is fitted to starboard. The head is just aft of the "V"-berth and on the starboard side. The cabin sole is made from teak and holly, while the main cabin folding table is teak, as are the cockpit seats.

Ventilation is provided by two deck hatches, one over the main cabin and one over the forward cabin.

The mainsail mainsheet traveler is mounted to the bridge deck. There are both inboard and outboard genoa tracks. Two primary cockpit winches are provided along with two secondary, plus four cabin-top winches for the halyards.

An optional staysail may be flown, using an adjustable track.

The design has a PHRF racing average handicap of 108.

== Operational history ==
In a 1994 review Richard Sherwood wrote, "this Ericson is a racing boat, but the construction technique minimizes weight, allowing for a full cruising interior. Ballast constitutes 45 percent of the total displacement, so she should be stiff."

== See also ==
- List of sailing boat types

Similar sailboats

- Beneteau 361
- Bayfield 36
- C&C 36-1
- C&C 36R
- C&C 110
- Catalina 36
- Columbia 36
- Coronado 35
- CS 36
- Frigate 36
- Hinterhoeller F3
- Hunter 36
- Hunter 36-2
- Hunter 36 Legend
- Hunter 36 Vision
- Invader 36
- Islander 36
- Nonsuch 36
- Portman 36
- S2 11.0
- Seidelmann 37
- Vancouver 36 (Harris)
- Watkins 36
- Watkins 36C
