= Seidelmann 37 =

Sailboat class

Development
- Designer: Bob Seidelmann
- Location: United States
- Year: 1980
- Builder: Seidelmann Yachts
- Role: Racer-Cruiser
- Name: Seidelmann 37

Boat
- Displacement: 12,000 lb (5,443 kg)
- Draft: 5.92 ft (1.80 m)

Hull
- Type: Monohull
- Construction: Fiberglass
- LOA: 36.83 ft (11.23 m)
- LWL: 31.00 ft (9.45 m)
- Beam: 12.00 ft (3.66 m)
- Engine: Yanmar 22 hp (16 kW) diesel engine

Hull appendages
- Keel: fin keel
- Ballast: 5,900 lb (2,676 kg)
- Rudder: spade-type rudder

Rig
- Rig type: Bermuda rig
- I foretriangle height: 49.50 ft (15.09 m)
- J foretriangle base: 15.30 ft (4.66 m)
- P mainsail luff: 44.00 ft (13.41 m)
- E mainsail foot: 12.00 ft (3.66 m)

Sails
- Sailplan: Masthead sloop
- Mainsail area: 264.00 sq ft (24.526 m^{2})
- Jib/genoa area: 378.68 sq ft (35.181 m^{2})
- Total sail area: 642.68 sq ft (59.707 m^{2})

Racing
- PHRF: 120 (average, deep keel)

The Seidelmann 37 is an American sailboat that was designed by Bob Seidelmann as a racer-cruiser and first built in 1980.

== Production ==
The design was built by Seidelmann Yachts in Berlin, New Jersey, United States, but it is now out of production.

== Design ==
The Seidelmann 37 is a recreational keelboat, built predominantly of fiberglass, with teak wood trim. It has a masthead sloop rig, with aluminum spars, a raked stem, a raised reverse transom, an internally mounted spade-type rudder controlled by a wheel and a fixed fin keel. It displaces 12,000 lb (5,443 kg) and carries 5,900 lb (2,676 kg) of ballast.

The design was produced with several different keel and rig combinations.

The boat has a draft of 5.92 ft (1.80 m) with the standard keel and 4.92 ft (1.50 m) with the optional shoal draft keel.

The boat is fitted with a Japanese Yanmar 2GMF Yanmar 2GM20 diesel engine of 22 or 24 hp (16 or 18 kW) for docking and maneuvering. The fuel tank holds 18 U.S. gallons (68 L; 15 imp gal) and the fresh water tank has a capacity of 70 U.S. gallons (260 L; 58 imp gal).

The design has sleeping accommodation for six people. There is a bow "V"-berth, two settee berths in the main cabin and a quarter berth aft, with a sixth, optional pilot berth above the settee berths. The galley is located aft, on the starboard side and includes a two-burner, alcohol-fired stove and oven, plus a sink with pressurized water. There is a navigation station on the port side that is normally angled, but can be leveled for use as counter space. The head is located on the port side and just aft of the bow "V"-berth. The cabin woodwork is all of teak.

Ventilation is provided by two dorade vents, bow cabin and main cabin deck hatches, plus four opening ports.

The cockpit is a T-shaped design. The halyards, topping lift and reefing lines are all mounted internally. The cockpit has two genoa sheeting winches, plus there are two additional winches on the mast for the halyards. There are also genoa sheet tracks mounted inboard. There is an anchor well in the bow.

The design has a PHRF racing average handicap of 120 with the deep keel fitted.

== Operational history ==
In a 1994 review, Richard Sherwood wrote, "like many Seidelmanns, this one has a very tall rig. The beam, however, is wide in relation to length. The result is a spacious interior."

== See also ==
- List of sailing boat types

Similar sailboats

- Bayfield 36
- Catalina 36
- C&C 36-1
- C&C 36R
- Columbia 36
- Coronado 35
- Crealock 37
- CS 36
- Ericson 36
- Frigate 36
- Hinterhoeller F3
- Hunter 36
- Hunter 36-2
- Hunter 36 Legend
- Hunter 36 Vision
- Invader 36
- Islander 36
- Nonsuch 36
- Portman 36
- S2 11.0
- Vancouver 36 (Harris)
- Watkins 36
- Watkins 36C
