= Islander 36 =

Sailboat class

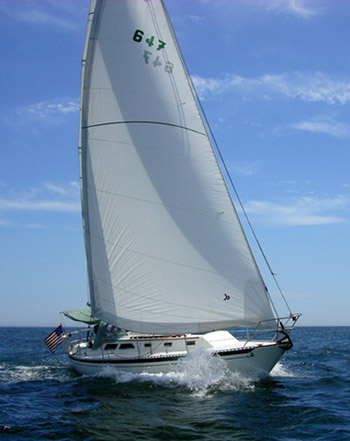

Development
- Designer: Alan Gurney
- Location: United States
- Year: 1971
- No. built: 770
- Builder: Islander Yachts/Tradewind Yachts
- Role: Cruiser
- Name: Islander 36

Boat
- Displacement: 13,450 lb (6,101 kg)
- Draft: 6.00 ft (1.83 m)

Hull
- Type: monohull
- Construction: fiberglass
- LOA: 36.08 ft (11.00 m)
- LWL: 28.25 ft (8.61 m)
- Beam: 11.17 ft (3.40 m)
- Engine: Yanmar diesel engine

Hull appendages
- Keel: fin keel
- Ballast: 5,450 lb (2,472 kg)
- Rudder: skeg-mounted rudder

Rig
- Rig type: Bermuda rig
- I foretriangle height: 45.00 ft (13.72 m)
- J foretriangle base: 14.48 ft (4.41 m)
- P mainsail luff: 39.25 ft (11.96 m)
- E mainsail foot: 12.75 ft (3.89 m)

Sails
- Sailplan: masthead sloop
- Mainsail area: 250.22 sq ft (23.246 m^{2})
- Jib/genoa area: 325.80 sq ft (30.268 m^{2})
- Total sail area: 576.02 sq ft (53.514 m^{2})

The Islander 36, sometimes referred to as the I36, is an American sailboat that was designed by Alan Gurney as a cruiser and first built in 1971.

== Production ==
The design was built by Islander Yachts/Tradewind Yachts in the United States from 1971 until 1986 with 770 boats completed, but it is now out of production.

The molds were purchased by Newport Offshore Yachts in 1986 but it is not known if any further boats were built.

== Design ==
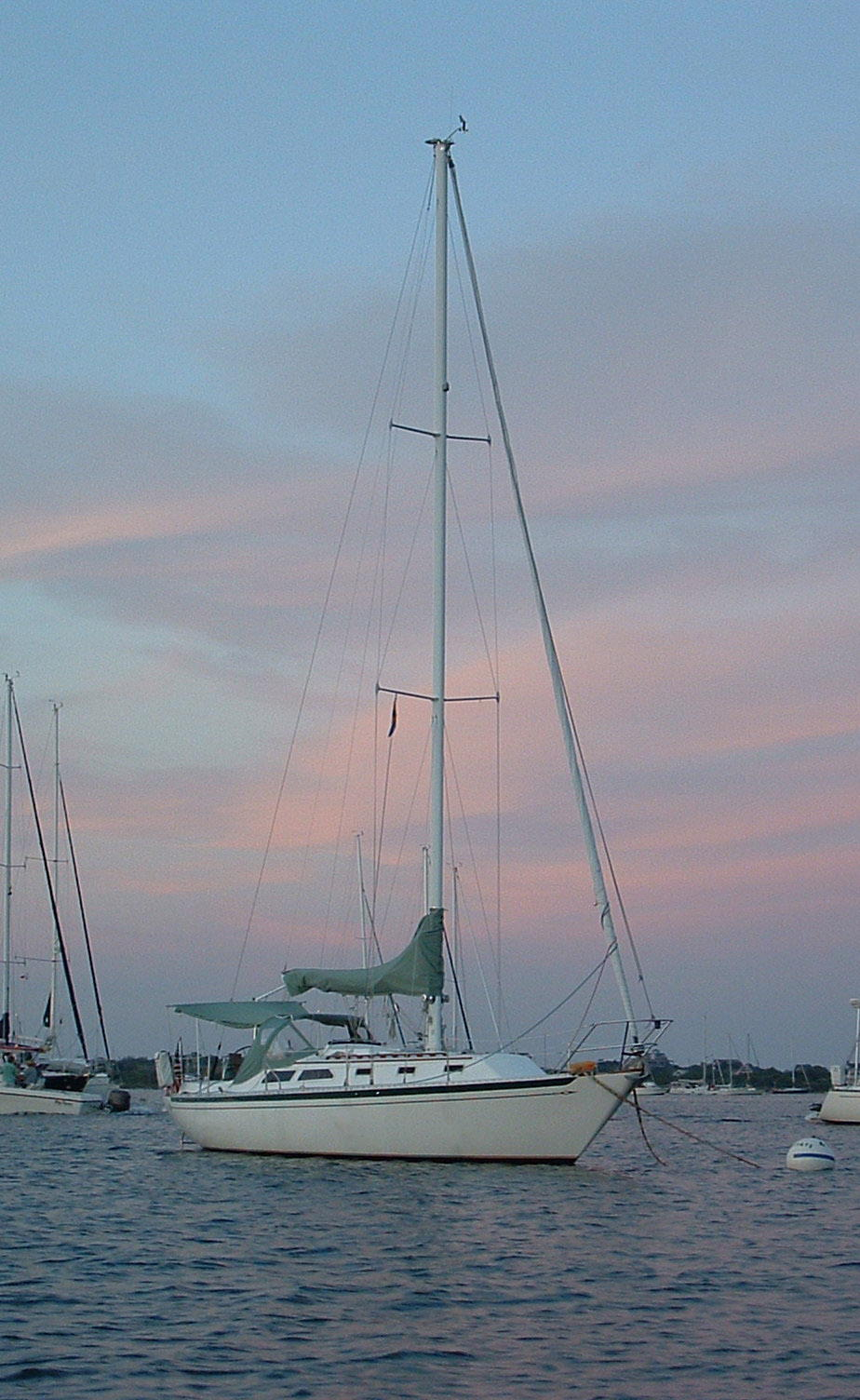
Islander 36

The Islander 36 is a recreational keelboat, built predominantly of fiberglass, with wood trim. It has a masthead sloop rig; a raked stem; a raised counter, reverse transom; a skeg-mounted rudder controlled by a wheel and a fixed fin keel. The fin keel model displaces 13,450 lb (6,101 kg) and carries 5,450 lb (2,472 kg) of lead ballast, while the shoal draft keel model displaces 13,600 lb (6,169 kg) and carries 5,600 lb (2,540 kg) of lead ballast.

The boat has a draft of 6.00 ft (1.83 m) with the standard keel and 4.9 ft (1.5 m) with the optional shoal draft keel.

A tall mast was also available for sailing in areas with lighter winds.

The boat was fitted with a large variety of inboard engines for docking and maneuvering, including the Universal Atomic 4 and the Palmer P-60 gasoline engines, the British Perkins Engines 4-108, Westerbeke L-25, Pathfinder and Japanese Yanmar diesel engines. The fuel tank holds 32 U.S. gallons (120 L; 27 imp gal) and the fresh water tank has a capacity of 54 U.S. gallons (200 L; 45 imp gal).

The design has sleeping accommodation for six people, with a double "V"-berth in the bow cabin and two straight settees in the main cabin that can be converted to doubles. The galley is located on the starboard side just forward of the companionway ladder and is equipped with a three-burner stove and a double sink. A navigation station is opposite the galley, on the port side. The head is located just aft of the bow cabin on the port side.

== Operational history ==
The boat is supported by an active class club that organizes racing events, the Islander 36 Association.

In a 2010 review in Talk of The Dock, stated, "the Islander 36 (I36) is a true classic ... and they’re great boats that will go the distance or race quite impressively"

== See also ==
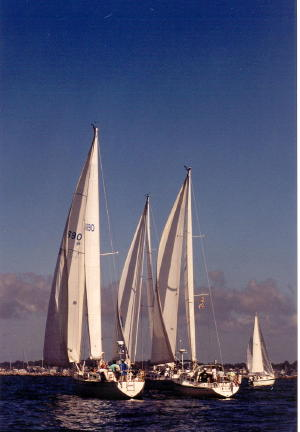
Islander 36s racing

- List of sailing boat types

Similar sailboats

- Beneteau 361
- C&C 36-1
- C&C 36R
- C&C 110
- Catalina 36
- Columbia 36
- Coronado 35
- CS 36
- Ericson 36
- Frigate 36
- Hunter 36
- Hunter 36-2
- Hunter 36 Legend
- Hunter 36 Vision
- Nonsuch 36
- Portman 36
- S2 11.0
- Seidelmann 37
- Watkins 36
- Watkins 36C
