= C&C 30 Redwing =

Sailboat class

Redwing 30
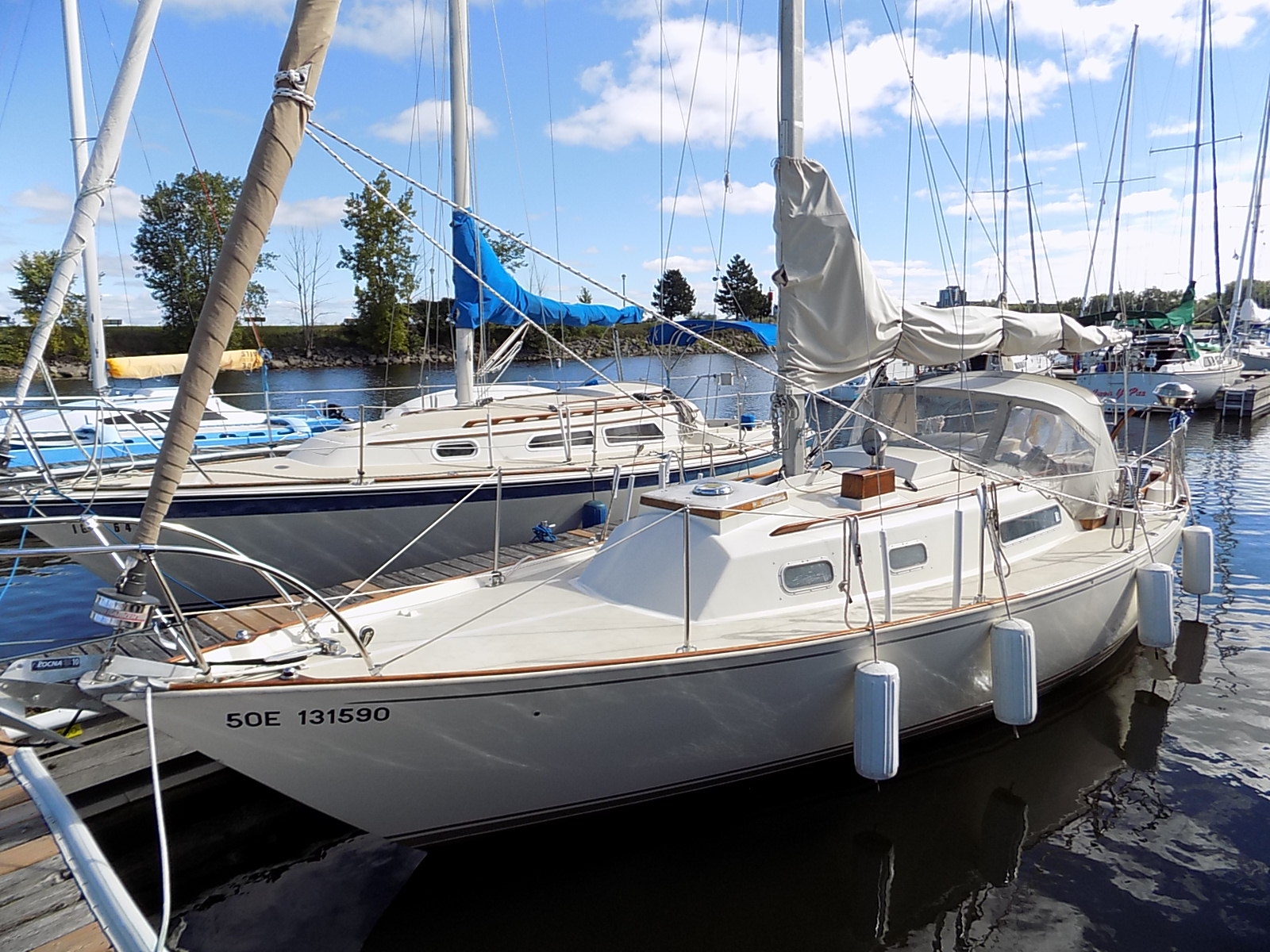

Development
- Designer: C&C Design
- Location: Canada
- Year: 1967
- No. built: between 145 and 150
- Builders: Hinterhoeller Yachts; C&C Yachts
- Name: Redwing 30

Boat
- Displacement: 7,650 lb (3,470 kg)
- Draft: 4.50 ft (1.37 m)

Hull
- Type: Monohull
- Construction: Fibreglass
- LOA: 30.25 ft (9.22 m)
- LWL: 21.75 ft (6.63 m)
- Beam: 8.75 ft (2.67 m)
- Engine: Universal Atomic 4 gasoline engine

Hull appendages
- Keel: swept fin keel
- Ballast: 3,530 lb (1,601 kg)
- Rudder: internally-mounted spade-type rudder

Rig
- Rig type: Bermuda rig
- I foretriangle height: 35.00 ft (10.67 m)
- J foretriangle base: 11.00 ft (3.35 m)
- P mainsail luff: 30.00 ft (9.14 m)
- E mainsail foot: 13.50 ft (4.11 m)

Sails
- Sailplan: Masthead sloop
- Mainsail area: 202.50 sq ft (18.813 m^{2})
- Jib/genoa area: 192.50 sq ft (17.884 m^{2})
- Total sail area: 395.00 sq ft (36.697 m^{2})

The C&C Redwing 30, also called the C&C 30 Redwing, Redwing 30 or just the Redwing, is a Canadian sailboat, that was designed by Cuthbertson & Cassian and first built in 1967.

== Production ==
Cuthbertson & Cassian designed the boat for Hinterhoeller Yachts, who put it into production in 1967 in Canada as the Redwing 30. When C&C Yachts bought out Hinterhoeller in 1972 the boat was still in production and was then sold as the C&C Redwing 30. Production ended later in 1972, in favour of more modern designs, with only about 145-150 examples completed

== Design ==
The Redwing 30 is a small recreational keelboat, built predominantly of fibreglass, with wood trim. It has a masthead sloop rig, a raked stem, a raised transom, an internally-mounted, scimitar-shaped, spade-type rudder controlled by a tiller and a fixed swept fin keel. It displaces 7,650 lb (3,470 kg) and carries 3,630 lb (1,647 kg) of ballast.

The scimitar shaped rudder design was dictated by the proximity of the propeller shaft and the need to reduce rudder pressure.

The boat has a draft of 4.50 ft (1.37 m) with the standard keel fitted. The boat is fitted with a Universal Atomic 4 gasoline engine.

The design has a hull speed of 6.25 kn (11.58 km/h).

== Operational history ==
In a 2000 used boat review, writer Karen Larson noted the boat's aesthetics and also wrote: "The Redwing isn't like the rest of the Canadian-built C&Cs that came a bit later and are so common on the Great Lakes ... Only 145 to 150 Redwings were built by Hinterhoeller between 1967 and 1972, before they cast those plans aside in favor of the C&C 30, of which more than 800 were produced between 1973 and 1985 ... Since the Redwing came relatively early in the history of production fiberglass boats, Cuthbertson and Cassian were clearly influenced by the designs of Carl Alberg. The Redwing has the recognizable wooden cockpit coamings and the pedestal-mounted winches. She has that beautiful upswept stern and a narrow beam. At 21 feet 9 inches her waterline is much shorter than her 30 feet on deck would lead you to believe. And space below is tight, as can be expected of all boats with the Alberg look."

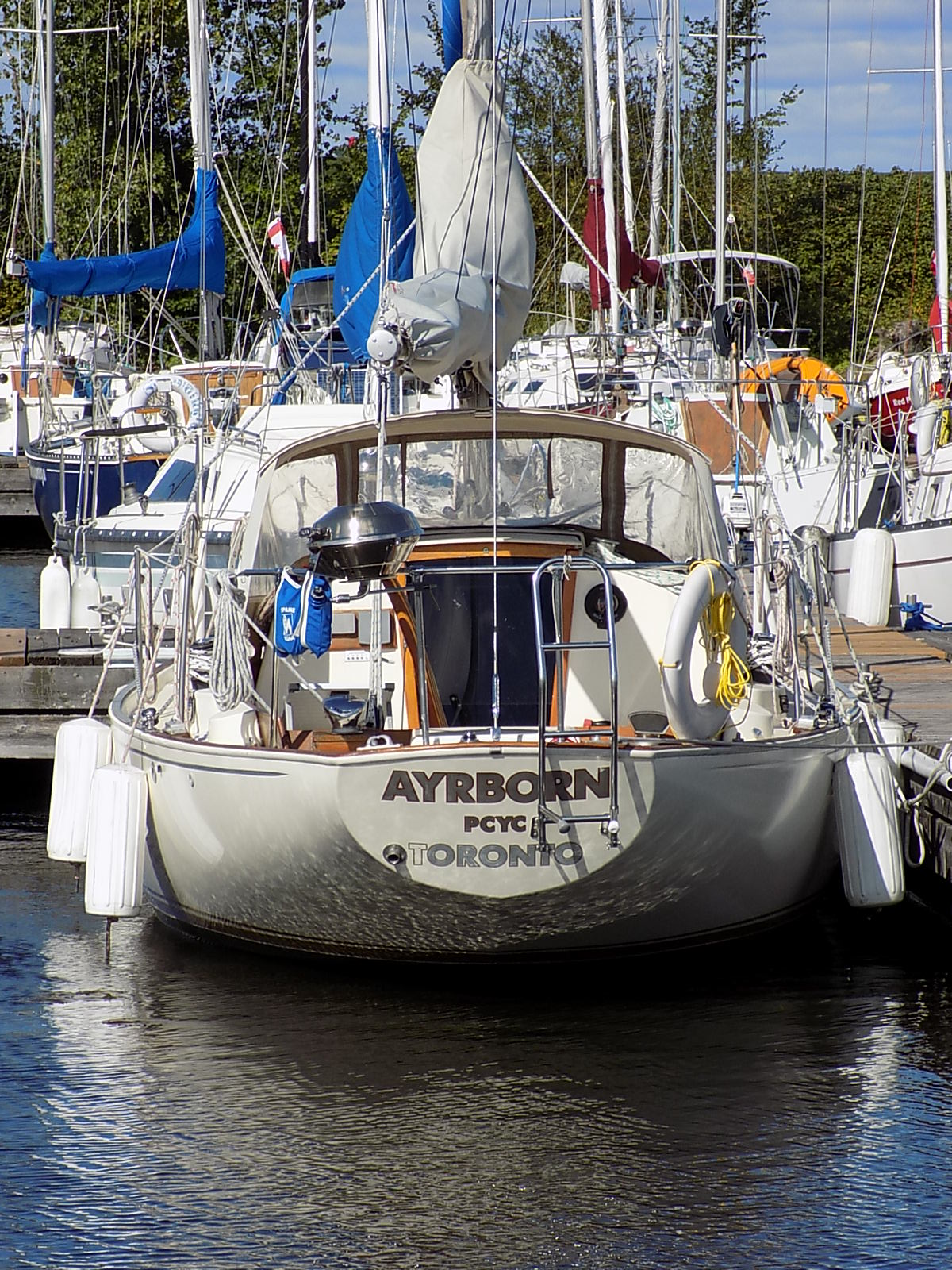
Redwing 30

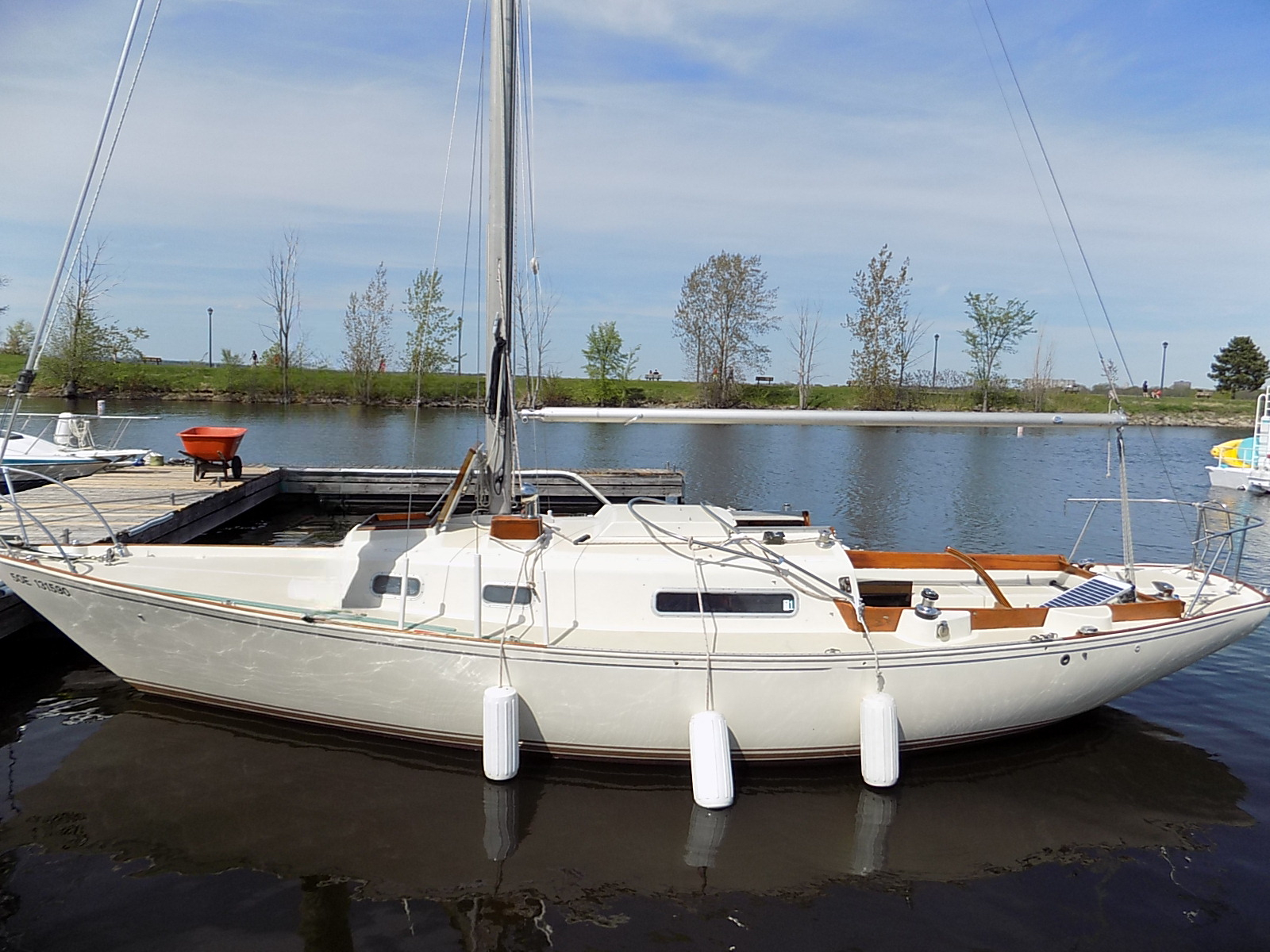
Redwing 30

Reviewer Ted Brewer wrote in 2000: "the Redwing was still very much state-of-the-art when she was designed ... The yacht was able to compete with CCA cruiser/racers of her size and larger and still win more than her share of silver ... she simply gobbled up competitors that rated a foot or so higher under the CCA rule. That is due, in part, to the unusually high ballast/displacement ratio, which keeps her standing up to the breeze despite her modest beam and her generous (by CCA standards) sail area ... In light weather she would still shine, as her short waterline, modest beam, and relatively slack-bilge hull help to reduce wetted surface, the major cause of resistance when the winds soften. Redwing's spade rudder and shark-style fin were also state-of-the-art for the late '60s. Her all-lead outside ballast gave her an edge over many competing yachts ... I don't consider the Redwing 30 to be a true bluewater yacht, due to her lack of a bridge deck and her deck-stepped mast, although I'm sure that many of them have made extensive offshore voyages ... By any standards, she is a classic."

== See also ==
- List of sailing boat types
