= Nonsuch 36 =

Sailboat class

Development
- Designer: Mark Ellis Design
- Location: Canada
- Year: 1983
- No. built: 70
- Builder: Hinterhoeller Yachts
- Name: Nonsuch 36

Boat
- Displacement: 17,000 lb (7,711 kg)
- Draft: 5.50 ft (1.68 m)

Hull
- Type: Monohull
- Construction: Fiberglass
- LOA: 36.00 ft (10.97 m)
- LWL: 33.75 ft (10.29 m)
- Beam: 12.67 ft (3.86 m)
- Engine: Westerbeke 52 hp (39 kW) diesel engine

Hull appendages
- Keel: fin keel
- Ballast: 6,500 lb (2,948 kg)
- Rudder: internally-mounted spade-type rudder

Rig
- Rig type: Cat rig
- P mainsail luff: 53.00 ft (16.15 m)
- E mainsail foot: 28.00 ft (8.53 m)

Sails
- Sailplan: Catboat
- Mainsail area: 742 sq ft (68.9 m^{2})
- Total sail area: 742 sq ft (68.9 m^{2})

Racing
- PHRF: 156 (average)

The Nonsuch 36 is a Canadian sailboat, that was designed by Mark Ellis Design and first built in 1983. The Nonsuch 36 is a development of the Nonsuch 30, which was the first design in the series of Nonsuch sailboats.

== Production ==
The design was built by Hinterhoeller Yachts in Canada. A total of 70 examples of the design were completed before production ended.

== Design ==
The Nonsuch 36 is a small recreational keelboat, built predominantly of fiberglass. It has a cat rig, an unstayed mast with a wishbone boom, a plumb stem, a vertical transom, an internally-mounted spade-type rudder controlled by a wheel and a fixed fin keel. It displaces 17,000 lb (7,711 kg) and carries 6,500 lb (2,948 kg) of ballast.

The boat has a draft of 5.50 ft (1.68 m) with the standard keel and 4.42 ft (1.35 m) with the optional shoal draft keel.

The boat is fitted with a Westerbeke diesel engine of 52 hp (39 kW). The fuel tank holds 100 U.S. gallons (380 L; 83 imp gal) and the fresh water tank has a capacity of 152 U.S. gallons (580 L; 127 imp gal).

The design has a PHRF racing average handicap of 156 and a hull speed of 7.78 kn (14.41 km/h).

== See also ==
- List of sailing boat types

Similar sailboats

- Bayfield 36
- Beneteau 361
- C&C 36-1
- C&C 36R
- Catalina 36
- Columbia 36
- Coronado 35
- Crealock 37
- CS 36
- Ericson 36
- Frigate 36
- Hunter 36
- Hunter 36-2
- Hunter 36 Legend
- Hunter 36 Vision
- Invader 36
- Islander 36
- Portman 36
- S2 11.0
- Seidelmann 37
- Vancouver 36 (Harris)
- Watkins 36
- Watkins 36C
