= Niagara 26 =

1970s Canadian recreational keelboat

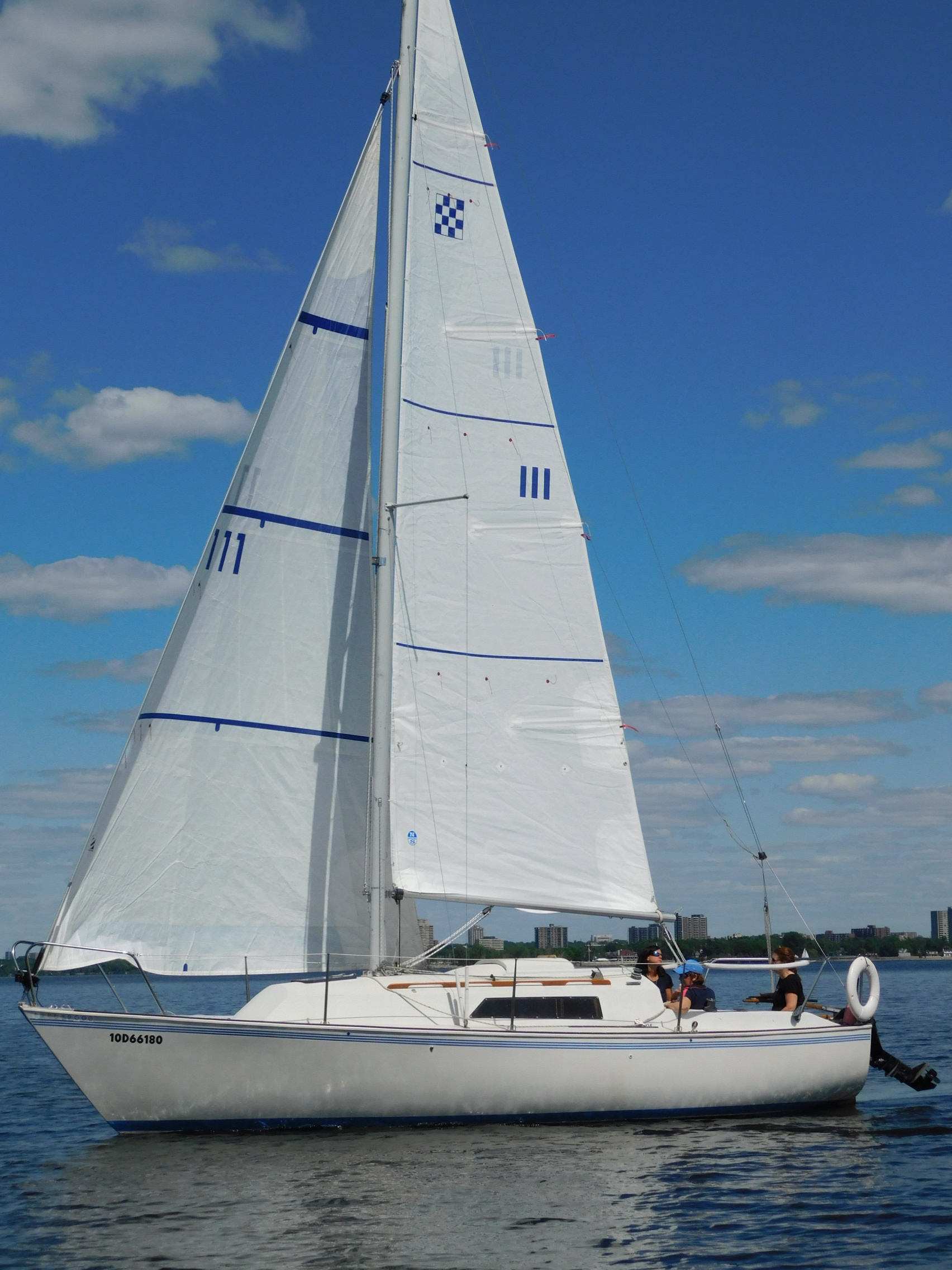

Development
- Designer: George Hinterhoeller
- Location: Canada
- Year: 1975
- No. built: 170
- Builders: Hinterhoeller Yachts, Goman Boat Limited, Halman Manufacturing Company
- Role: Racer-Cruiser
- Name: Niagara 26

Boat
- Displacement: 4,000 lb (1,814 kg)
- Draft: 4.42 ft (1.35 m)

Hull
- Type: Monohull
- Construction: Fibreglass
- LOA: 26.67 ft (8.13 m)
- LWL: 23.00 ft (7.01 m)
- Beam: 8.33 ft (2.54 m)
- Engine: Inboard motor/outboard motor

Hull appendages
- Keel: fin keel
- Ballast: 1,700 lb (771 kg)
- Rudder: transom-mounted rudder

Rig
- Rig type: Bermuda rig
- I foretriangle height: 29.00 ft (8.84 m)
- J foretriangle base: 10.42 ft (3.18 m)
- P mainsail luff: 30.00 ft (9.14 m)
- E mainsail foot: 11.00 ft (3.35 m)

Sails
- Sailplan: Fractional rigged sloop
- Mainsail area: 165.00 sq ft (15.329 m^{2})
- Jib/genoa area: 151.09 sq ft (14.037 m^{2})
- Total sail area: 316.09 sq ft (29.366 m^{2})

Racing
- PHRF: 183-211

The Niagara 26 is a recreational keelboat designed as a racer-cruiser. It was one of the first designs put into production after George Hinterhoeller had left C&C Yachts to establish Hinterhoeller Yachts.

About 170 were built from 1976 to the mid-1980s. Early boats were made by Hinterhoeller Yachts with later boats produced under license first by Goman Boat and then by Halman Manufacturing. All were built in southern Ontario, Canada.

The fibreglass hull has a plumb transom, a transom-hung rudder controlled by a tiller and a fixed fin keel. It has a hull speed of 6.43 kn (11.91 km/h) and a PHRF handicap of 186 to 195 for the inboard engine-equipped version and 183 to 211 for the outboard motor version.

It is a fractional sloop. The boat is designed for racing performance, and the skipper can adjust the cunningham, outhaul, backstay, and has adjustable backstay, cunningham, and outhaul. Four halyards are led to the spacious cockpit, which is crossed by a mainsheet traveller. The mast is deck-stepped.

The Niagara 26 is suitable for cruising, with 65 inches of cabin headroom, an enclosed head, galley, and hanging locker.
