= Invader 36 =

Sailboat class

Development
- Designer: C&C Design
- Location: Canada
- Year: 1965
- Builders: Hinterhoeller Yachts, Belleville Marine Yard, C&C Yachts
- Name: Invader 36

Boat
- Displacement: 10,550 lb (4,785 kg)
- Draft: 5.00 ft (1.52 m)

Hull
- Type: Monohull
- Construction: Fiberglass
- LOA: 35.75 ft (10.90 m)
- LWL: 24.25 ft (7.39 m)
- Beam: 9.16 ft (2.79 m)
- Engine: Universal Atomic 4 gasoline engine

Hull appendages
- Keel: long keel
- Ballast: 3,800 lb (1,724 kg)
- Rudder: keel-mounted rudder

Rig
- Rig type: Bermuda rig
- I foretriangle height: 37.58 ft (11.45 m)
- J foretriangle base: 13.58 ft (4.14 m)
- P mainsail luff: 32.67 ft (9.96 m)
- E mainsail foot: 15.25 ft (4.65 m)

Sails
- Sailplan: Masthead sloop
- Mainsail area: 249.11 sq ft (23.143 m^{2})
- Jib/genoa area: 255.17 sq ft (23.706 m^{2})
- Total sail area: 504.28 sq ft (46.849 m^{2})

The Invader 36 is a Canadian sailboat, that was designed by C&C Design specifically for Hinterhoeller Yachts and first built in 1965.

The Invader 36 design was developed into the Frigate 36 in 1968, by shortening the long keel into a stub long keel, adding a centreboard and increasing the sail area.

== Production ==
The Invader 36 design was built by Hinterhoeller Yachts in Canada, but the majority were constructed at Belleville Marine Yard, both of which became part of C&C Yachts. Production ran from 1965 to 1969, but it is now out of production.

== Design ==
The Invader 36 is a recreational keelboat, built predominantly of fiberglass, with wood trim. It has a masthead sloop rig, a raked stem, a raised counter transom, a keel-mounted rudder controlled by a wheel and a fixed long keel. It displaces 10,575 lb (4,797 kg) and carries 3,800 lb (1,724 kg) of ballast.

The boat has a draft of 5.00 ft (1.52 m) and was factory-fitted with a Universal Atomic 4 gasoline engine.

The design has a hull speed of 6.6 kn (12.22 km/h).

== See also ==
- List of sailing boat types

Related development

- Frigate 36

Similar sailboats

- Bayfield 36
- C&C 36-1
- C&C 36R
- C&C 110
- Catalina 36
- Columbia 36
- Coronado 35
- CS 36
- Ericson 36
- Hinterhoeller F3
- Hunter 36
- Hunter 36-2
- Hunter 36 Legend
- Hunter 36 Vision
- Nonsuch 36
- Portman 36
- S2 11.0
- Seidelmann 37
- Vancouver 36 (Harris)
- Watkins 36
- Watkins 36C
