= Hinterhoeller Yachts =

Canadian sailboat manufacturer

- Company type: Privately held company
- Industry: Boat building
- Founded: 1956
- Defunct: 1995
- Headquarters: St. Catharines, Ontario, Canada
- Key people: President: George Hinterhoeller
- Products: Sailboats

Hinterhoeller Yachts was a Canadian boat builder based in St. Catharines, Ontario. The company specialized in the design and manufacture of fiberglass sailboats.

The company was originally founded by George Hinterhoeller as Hinterhoeller Limited in Niagara-on-the-Lake, when he started boatbuilding in 1956. It was absorbed into C&C Yachts when he helped found that company in 1969. He sold his C&C shares in 1975 and restarted his own company in 1977. The company was wound-up in 1995 and Hinterhoeller died in 1999.

== History ==
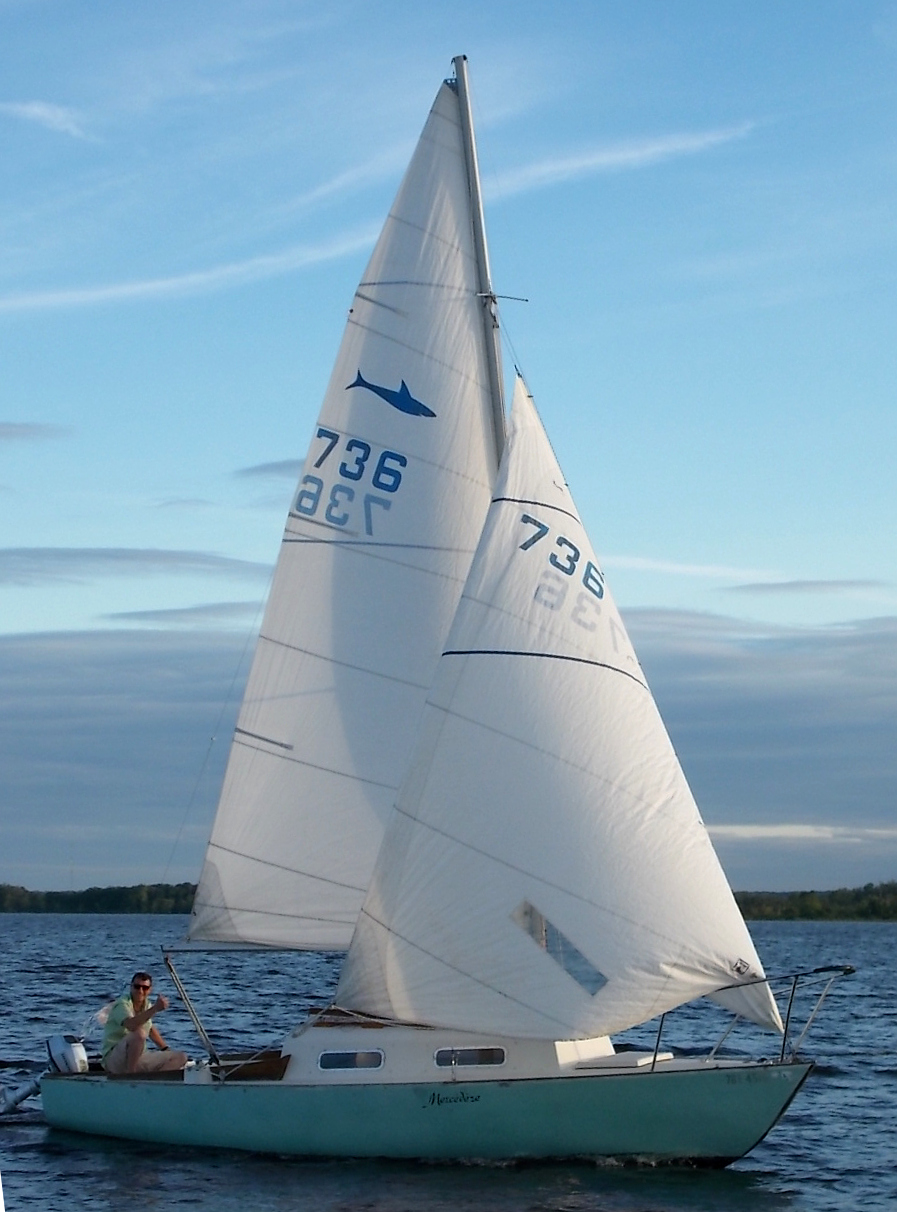
Shark 24

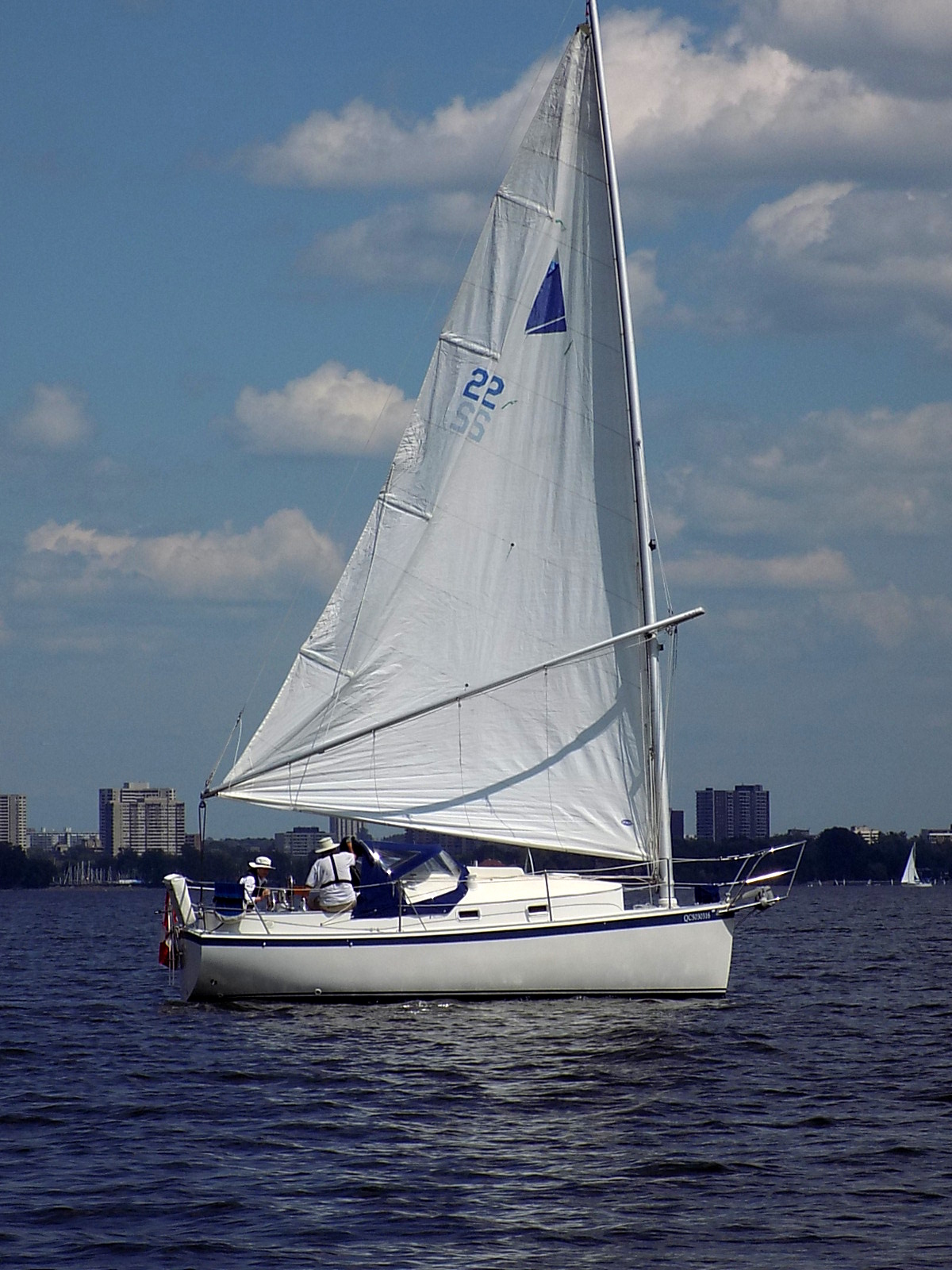
Nonsuch 22

The first design produced was the Y Flyer, which Hinterhoeller built in his spare time while building power boats at Shepherd Boats in Niagara-on-the-Lake. He finished 40 Y flyers starting in 1956. The next was Hinterhoeller's original design, the Shark 24. It was first built in 1959 of wood and later in fibreglass and attained racing success.

The company went on to build designs such as the Redwing 30, Invader 36, Douglas 31/32 and the Frigate 36 during the late 1960s.

The company was absorbed into C&C Yachts when that company was formed in 1967, with Hinterhoeller as a founding partner. By 1975 Hinterhoeller had grown tired of working in a large corporate environment, sold his shares and retired. Two years later, in 1977, he reformed his old company in a purpose-built 62,000 sq ft (5,800 m^{2}) facility in St Catharines, Ontario, on Lake Ontario.

The reformed company engaged yacht designers Mark Ellis for cruising boats like the Niagara 35 and the Nonsuch line and Germán Frers for racing boats like the Niagara 31. The Nonsuch boats achieved notable commercial success, with 975 built. They are noted for their distinctive hull shapes, large interiors and unstayed catboat rigs.

Richard Hinterhoeller, who was George's son and a partner in the reformed Hinterhoeller Yachts explained the company's operating concept. "The business plan was to operate a shop with two production lines. The two models were to be a 30' club racer/cruiser and a 35' bluewater cruising boat. Both were to be sensible, timeless models. George had been impressed by the Aurora 40 from Mark Ellis and contracted him to design the Niagara 35. For the smaller boat, George sat on his C&C 30 and made a list of the 10 items which would take an already great boat and make it better. In his typical down-to-earth fashion, George added up the necessary lengths of berths, head, cockpit and galley, and ended up with a target length of 31 feet."

In 1986 much of the production was moved to the Halman Manufacturing Company in Beamsville, Ontario. In 1989 the company entered receivership and was bought by Strategic Associates Inc. in 1990. In 1993 that company consolidated its production with C&C Yachts. Then, in 1994, a fire destroyed much of the C&C facilities and Hinterhoeller moved into what was left. Hinterhoeller Yachts closed down in November 1995. The Hinterhoeller trademarks expired in 1998 and George Hinterhoeller died from complications from a stroke in the spring of 1999.

== Boats ==
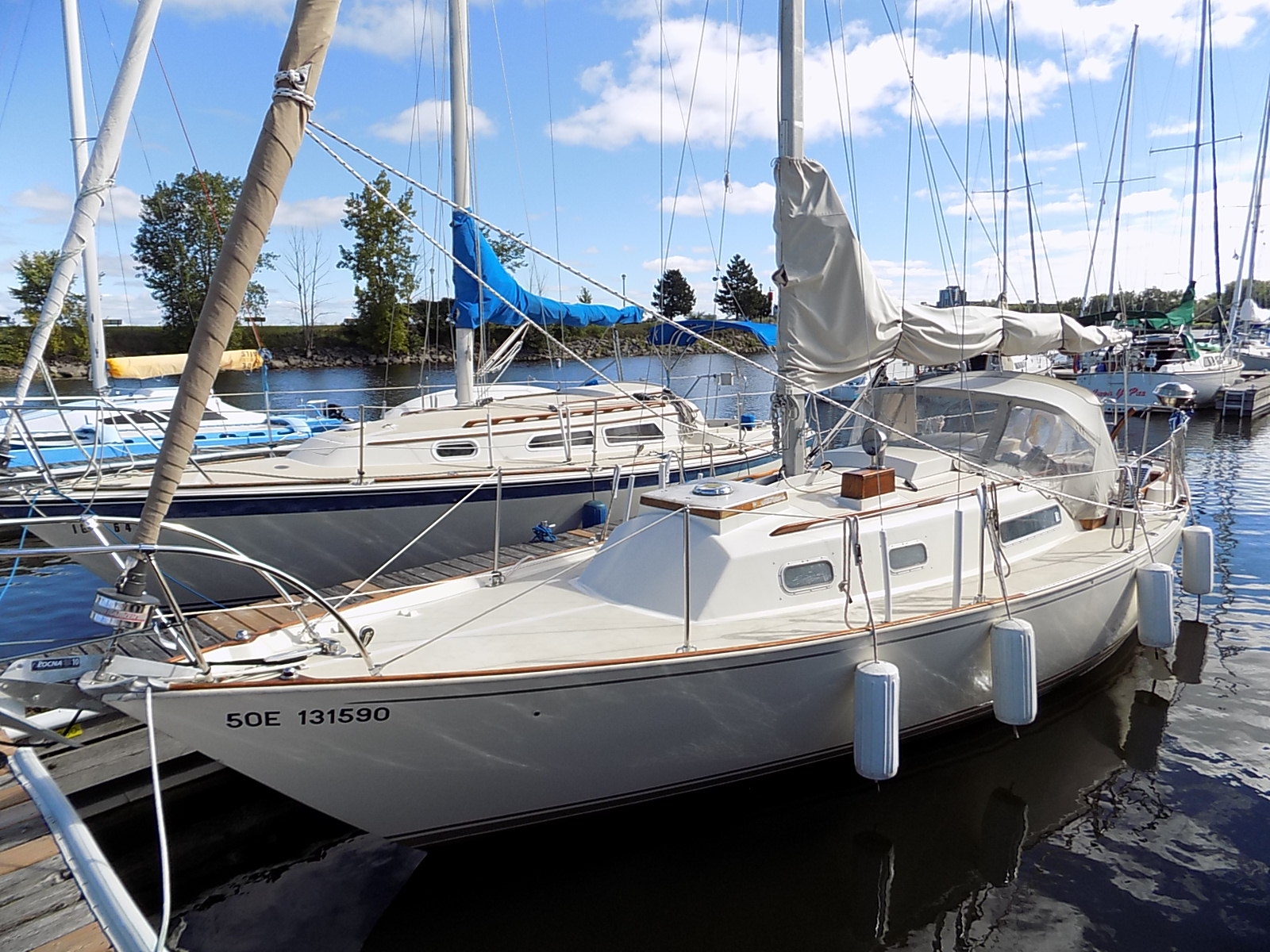
Redwing 30

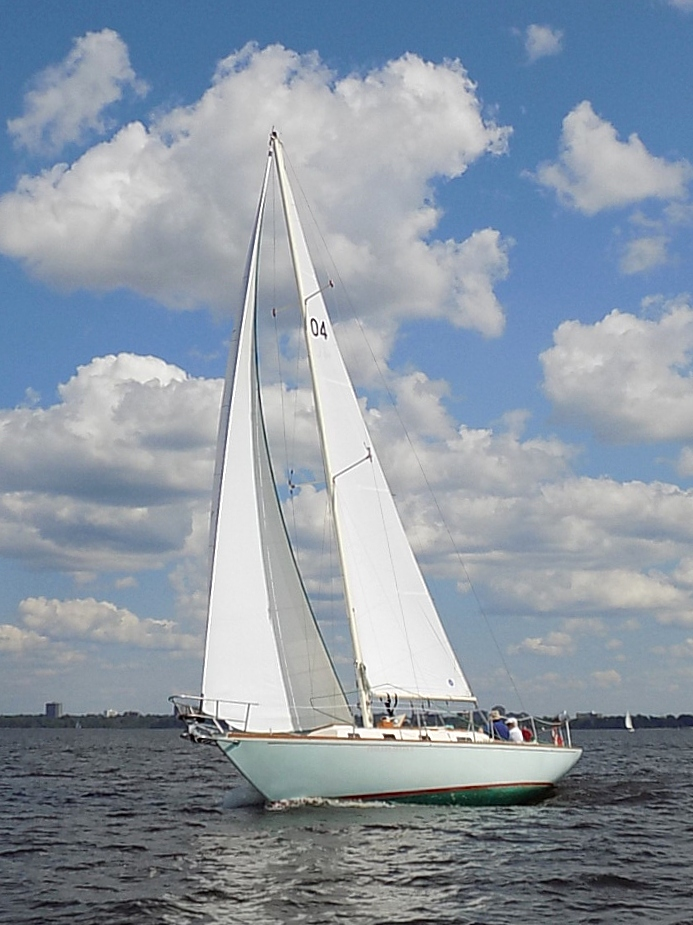
Frigate 36

Summary of boats built by Hinterhoeller Yachts:

- Y flyer 1956
- Shark 24 1959
- Cygnus 20 1965
- Invader 36 1965
- Douglas 31/32 1967
- Hinterhoeller 28 1967
- HR-28 (Hinterhoeller) 1967
- Niagara 30 1967
- Redwing 30 1967
- Frigate 36 1968
- Hinterhoeller 25 1969
- Hinterhoeller 30 1969
- HR-25 (Hinterhoeller) 1969
- Redwing 35 1969
- Niagara 26 1975
- Aurora 40 1976
- Niagara 31 1977
- Niagara 35 1978
- Nonsuch 30 1978
- Hinterhoeller F3 1981
- Nonsuch 26 1982
- GT-26 (Hinterhoeller) 1983
- Nonsuch 36 1983
- Niagara 35 Encore 1984
- Niagara 42 1984
- Nonsuch 22 1984
- Nonsuch 33 1988
- Nonsuch 324 1994

== See also ==
- List of sailboat designers and manufacturers
