= Hunter 36 Vision =

Sailboat class

Development
- Location: United States
- Year: 1990
- Builder: Hunter Marine
- Name: Hunter 36 Vision

Boat
- Displacement: 15,500 lb (7,031 kg)
- Draft: 4.67 ft (1.42 m)

Hull
- Type: Monohull
- Construction: Fiberglass
- LOA: 36.00 ft (10.97 m)
- LWL: 31.00 ft (9.45 m)
- Beam: 12.75 ft (3.89 m)
- Engine: Yanmar diesel engine

Hull appendages
- Keel: wing keel
- Ballast: 5,900 lb (2,676 kg)
- Rudder: internally-mounted spade-type rudder

Rig
- Rig type: Bermuda rig
- I foretriangle height: 39.00 ft (11.89 m)
- J foretriangle base: 10.50 ft (3.20 m)
- P mainsail luff: 51.00 ft (15.54 m)
- E mainsail foot: 18.50 ft (5.64 m)

Sails
- Sailplan: Free-standing fractional rigged sloop
- Mainsail area: 471.75 sq ft (43.827 m^{2})
- Jib/genoa area: 204.75 sq ft (19.022 m^{2})
- Total sail area: 676.50 sq ft (62.849 m^{2})

Racing
- PHRF: 144 (average)

The Hunter 36 Vision is an American sailboat designed for cruising and first built in 1990.

The design can be confused with the 1980 Hunter 36, 2008 Hunter 36-2 (sold as the Hunter 36) and the 2001 Hunter 36 Legend, all sailboats with similar names by the same builder.

== Production ==
The design was built by Hunter Marine in the United States between 1990 and 1995, but it is now out of production.

== Design ==
The Hunter 36 Vision is a recreational keelboat, built predominantly of fiberglass, with wood trim. It has a free-standing fractional sloop rig, with a fully battened mainsail, a raked stem, a reverse transom, an internally mounted spade-type rudder controlled by a wheel and a fixed wing keel. It displaces 15,500 lb (7,031 kg) and carries 5,900 lb (2,676 kg) of ballast.

The boat has a draft of 4.67 ft (1.42 m) with the standard keel fitted.

The boat is fitted with a Japanese Yanmar diesel engine. The fuel tank holds 35 U.S. gallons (130 L; 29 imp gal) and the fresh water tank has a capacity of 75 U.S. gallons (280 L; 62 imp gal).

The design has a PHRF racing average handicap of 144 with a high of 150 and low of 135. It has a hull speed of 7.46 kn (13.82 km/h).

== See also ==
- List of sailing boat types

Related development

- Hunter 32 Vision

Similar sailboats

- Bayfield 40
- Beneteau 361
- C&C 36-1
- C&C 36R
- C&C 110
- Catalina 36
- Columbia 36
- Coronado 35
- Crealock 37
- CS 36
- Ericson 36
- Frigate 36
- Hunter 36
- Hunter 36 Legend
- Hunter 36-2
- Invader 36
- Islander 36
- Nonsuch 36
- Portman 36
- S2 11.0
- Seidelmann 37
- Watkins 36
- Watkins 36C
