= Hinterhoeller F3 =

Sailboat class

Development
- Designer: Germán Frers
- Location: Canada
- Year: 1981
- Builder: Hinterhoeller Yachts
- Role: Racer-Cruiser
- Name: Hinterhoeller F3

Boat
- Displacement: 10,900 lb (4,944 kg)
- Draft: 6.75 ft (2.06 m)

Hull
- Type: Monohull
- Construction: Fibreglass
- LOA: 36.35 ft (11.08 m)
- LWL: 29.50 ft (8.99 m)
- Beam: 11.80 ft (3.60 m)
- Engine: Westerbeke 27 or 29 hp (20 or 22 kW) diesel engine

Hull appendages
- Keel: fin keel
- Ballast: 5,730 lb (2,599 kg)
- Rudder: internally-mounted spade-type rudder

Rig
- Rig type: Bermuda rig
- I foretriangle height: 48.28 ft (14.72 m)
- J foretriangle base: 14.50 ft (4.42 m)
- P mainsail luff: 42.25 ft (12.88 m)
- E mainsail foot: 13.25 ft (4.04 m)

Sails
- Sailplan: Masthead sloop
- Mainsail area: 279.91 sq ft (26.004 m^{2})
- Jib/genoa area: 350.03 sq ft (32.519 m^{2})
- Total sail area: 629.94 sq ft (58.523 m^{2})

Racing
- PHRF: 96 (average)

The Hinterhoeller F3 (or F 3) is a Canadian sailboat that was designed by Argentine naval architect Germán Frers as a racer-cruiser and first built in 1981.

The F3 design moulds were later sold and the boat was developed into the Carroll Marine F36 in 1982, with a new deck and coach house design. It was later further developed into the Frers 36 and during its production run saw many changes to the rig, rudder and keel designs.

== Production ==
The F3 was built by Hinterhoeller Yachts in Canada from 1981 to 1983, but it is now out of production.

== Design ==
The F3 is a recreational keelboat, built predominantly of fibreglass over a balsa core. It has a masthead sloop rig with running backstays and aluminum spars, a raked stem, a raised sharp reverse transom, an internally mounted spade-type rudder controlled by a wheel and a fixed fin keel. It displaces 10,900 lb (4,944 kg) and carries 5,730 lb (2,599 kg) of lead ballast. The design incorporates features of the International Offshore Rule (IOR), without completely complying with it.

The boat has a draft of 6.75 ft (2.06 m) with the standard keel fitted.

The boat is fitted with a Westerbeke 27 or 29 hp (20 or 22 kW) diesel engine for docking and maneuvering. The fuel tank holds 15 or 25 U.S. gallons (57 or 95 L; 12 or 21 imp gal) and the fresh water tank has a capacity of 40 U.S. gallons (150 L; 33 imp gal).

Later production versions had a taller rig, with a mast about 7.75 ft (2.4 m) higher and 6.4% more sail area; a longer keel, giving a draft of 6.92 ft (2.11 m) and a lighter displacement.

The design provides sleeping accommodation for up to eight people. There is a bow "V"-berth, two double cabin settee berths and two aft quarter berths. For racing the forward bow berth is normally used for sail storage. The galley has foot-pumped water and a three-burner propane-fuelled stove, with a refrigerator optional. There is a cockpit locker provided for dedicated propane tank storage. The is a separate navigation station amidships, with its own seat. The head is forward on the port side, just aft of the "V"-berth.

Ventilation is provided by a single forward hatch, an opening port over the head and two main cabin ports.

The cockpit is T-shaped, with all the lines leading to it for sail control. There are eight winches provided, four on the coach house roof got the halyards and the spinnaker, plus four cockpit winches for the genoa sheeting. Long genoa tracks are mounted inboard, which allow 8° close sheeting. The mainsheet traveller is mounted recessed into the deck just aft of the bridge deck. The toe rail is perforated and full length.

The design has a PHRF racing average handicap of 96 and an estimated IOR rating of 28.5.

== Operational history ==
In a 1994 review Richard Sherwood wrote, "this boat has been designed for both racing and cruising. The hull and rig give a lot of consideration to the IOR without completely succumbing to it. Neither is radical. While the boat is suited for cruising, the interior has certain features that are meant for racing. Balance, in particular, has been emphasized."

== See also ==
- List of sailing boat types

Similar sailboats

- Bayfield 36
- C&C 36-1
- C&C 36R
- Catalina 36
- Columbia 36
- Crealock 37
- CS 36
- Ericson 36
- Frigate 36
- Hunter 36
- Invader 36
- Portman 36
- S2 11.0
- Seidelmann 37
- Watkins 36
- Watkins 36C
