= Frigate 36 =

Sailboat class

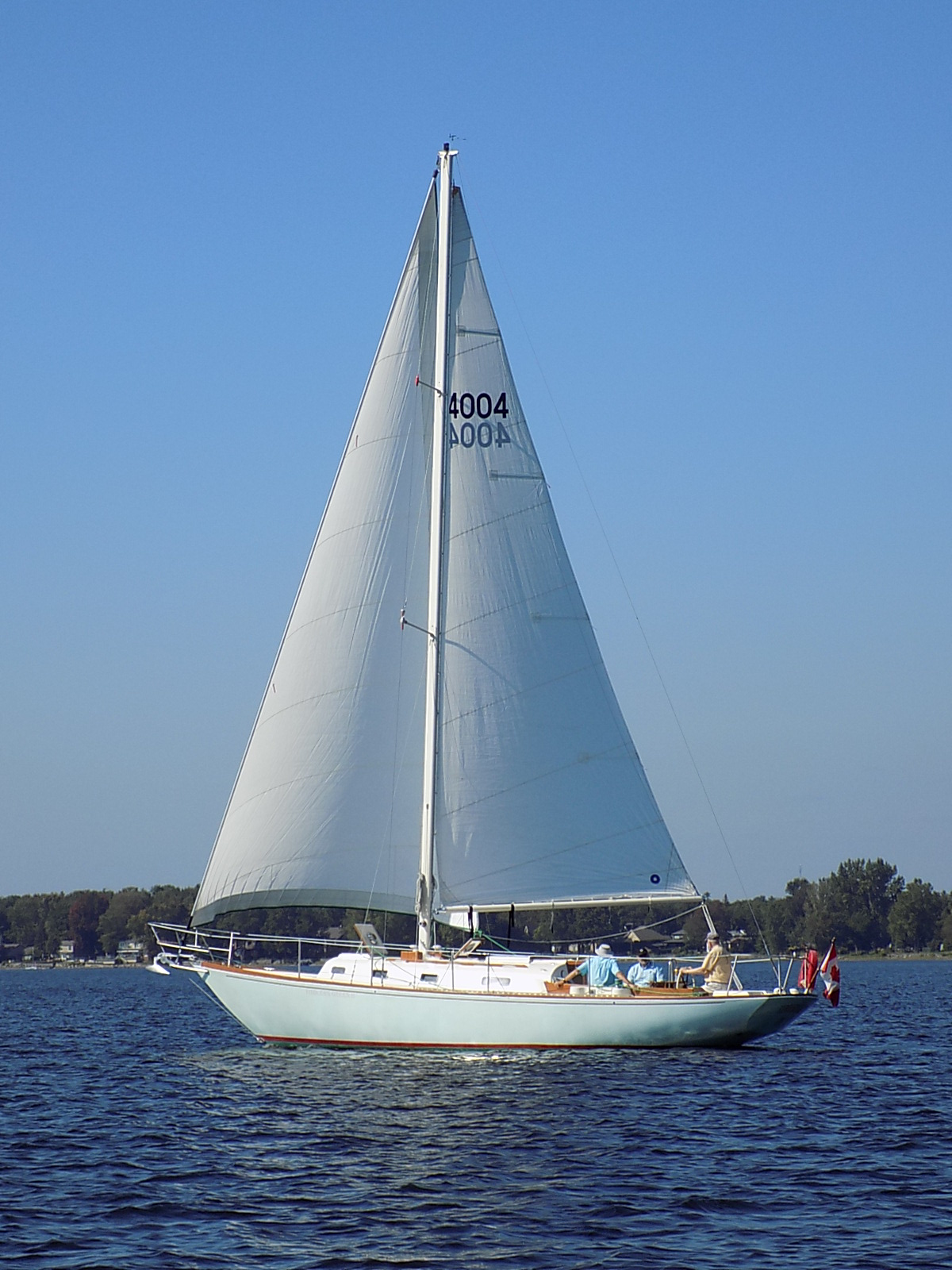

Development
- Designer: C&C Design
- Location: Canada
- Year: 1968
- No. built: 36
- Builders: Belleville Marine Yard, Hinterhoeller Yachts, C&C Yachts
- Name: Frigate 36

Boat
- Displacement: 11,575 lb (5,250 kg)
- Draft: 7.16 ft (2.18 m) with centreboard down

Hull
- Type: Monohull
- Construction: Fiberglass
- LOA: 35.67 ft (10.87 m)
- LWL: 24.42 ft (7.44 m)
- Beam: 10.20 ft (3.11 m)
- Engine: Universal Atomic 4 gasoline engine

Hull appendages
- Keel: stub long keel with centreboard
- Ballast: 5,200 lb (2,359 kg)
- Rudder: keel-mounted rudder

Rig
- Rig type: Bermuda rig
- I foretriangle height: 42.42 ft (12.93 m)
- J foretriangle base: 13.33 ft (4.06 m)
- P mainsail luff: 36.50 ft (11.13 m)
- E mainsail foot: 12.50 ft (3.81 m)

Sails
- Sailplan: Masthead sloop
- Mainsail area: 228.13 sq ft (21.194 m^{2})
- Jib/genoa area: 282.73 sq ft (26.266 m^{2})
- Total sail area: 510.85 sq ft (47.460 m^{2})

The Frigate 36 is a Canadian sailboat, that was designed by C&C Design and first built in 1968. It is named in honour of the Frigate warship class.

The Frigate 36 is a development of the 1966 C&C-designed Invader 36, with a stub long keel and centerboard in place of the fixed long keel and with more sail area.

== Production ==
The design was built by Belleville Marine Yard and also by Hinterhoeller Yachts, both part of C&C Yachts, in Canada. They completed 36 examples of the design starting in 1968, but the design is now out of production.

== Design ==
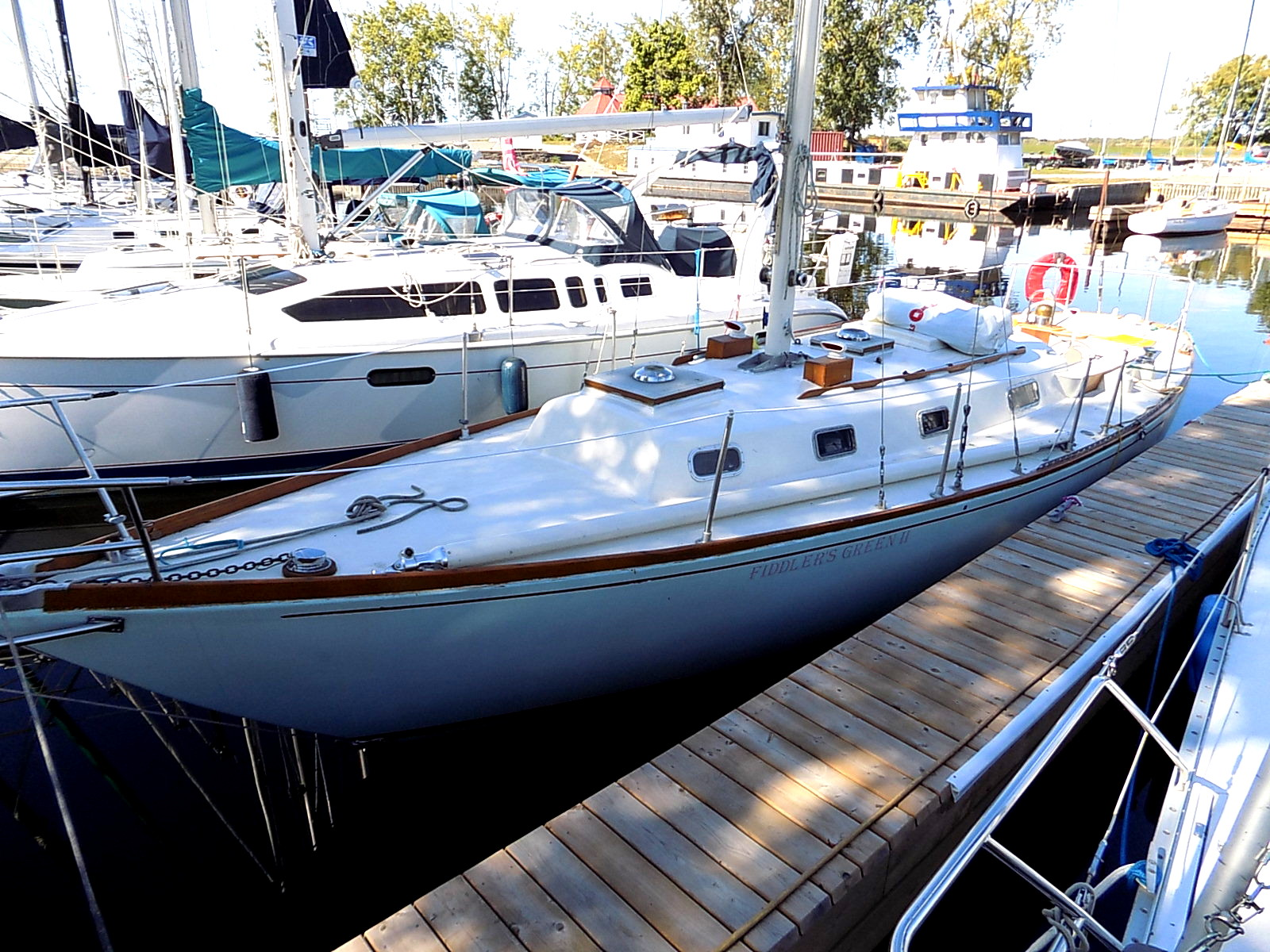
Frigate 36

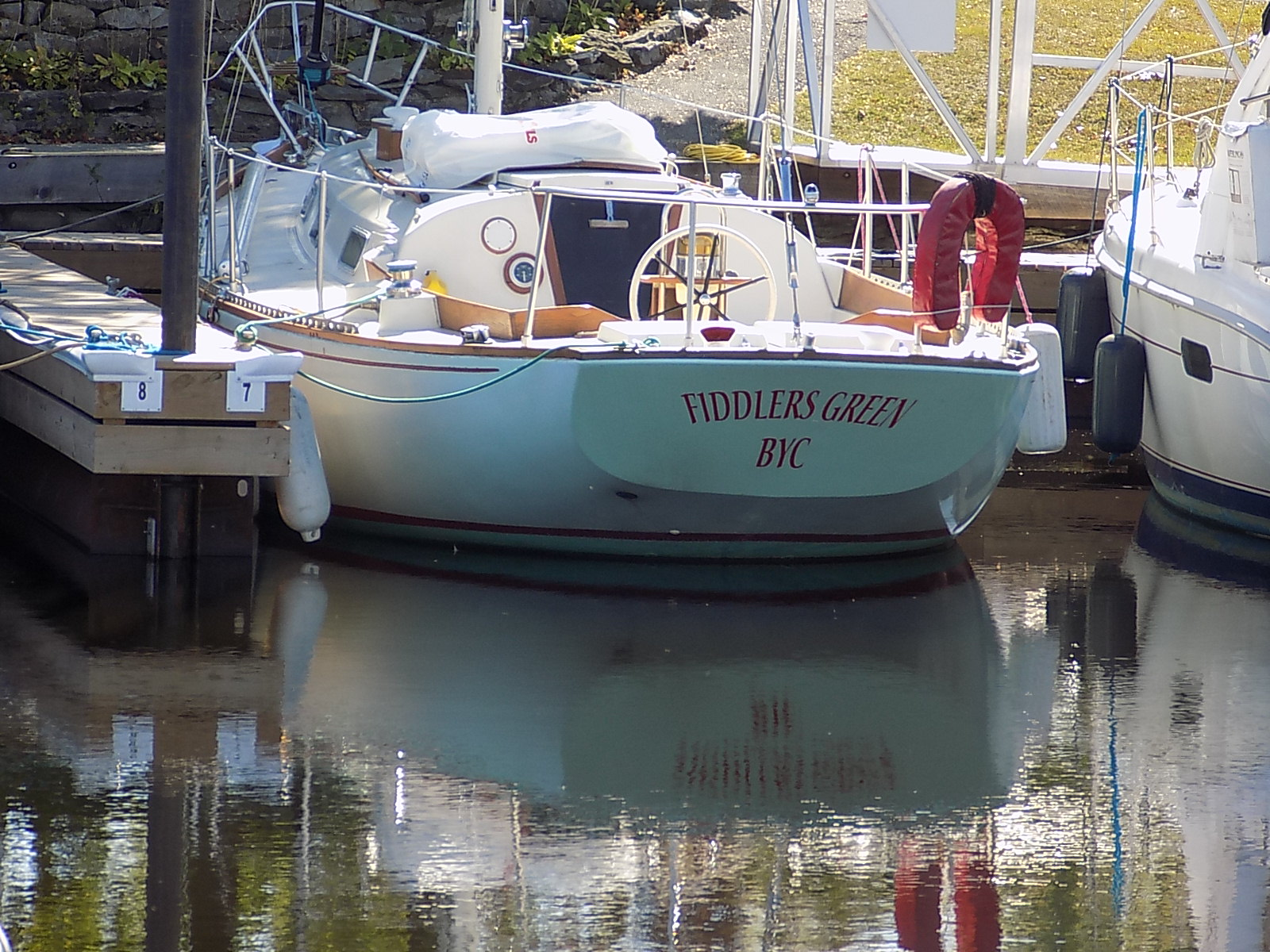
Stern view of a Frigate 36, showing the transom and wheel

The Frigate 36 is a small recreational keelboat, built predominantly of fiberglass, with wood trim. It has a masthead sloop rig, a raked stem, a raised reverse transom, a keel-mounted rudder controlled by a wheel tiller and a fixed stub long keel, with a centreboard. It displaces 11,575 lb (5,250 kg) and carries 5,200 lb (2,359 kg) of ballast.

The boat has a draft of 7.16 ft (2.18 m) with the centreboard extended and 3.58 ft (1.09 m) with it retracted.

The boat was factory-fitted with a Universal Atomic 4 gasoline engine. The fuel tank holds 18 U.S. gallons (68 L; 15 imp gal) and the fresh water tank has a capacity of 25 U.S. gallons (95 L; 21 imp gal).

The design has a hull speed of 6.62 kn (12.26 km/h).

== See also ==
- List of sailing boat types

Related development

- Corvette 31
- Invader 36

Similar sailboats

- Bayfield 36
- Beneteau 361
- C&C 36-1
- C&C 36R
- C&C 110
- Catalina 36
- Columbia 36
- Coronado 35
- CS 36
- Ericson 36
- Hinterhoeller F3
- Hunter 36
- Hunter 36-2
- Hunter 36 Legend
- Hunter 36 Vision
- Islander 36
- Nonsuch 36
- Portman 36
- S2 11.0
- Seidelmann 37
- Vancouver 36 (Harris)
- Watkins 36
- Watkins 36C
