= Catalina 36 =

Sailboat class

Catalina 36 Mark II
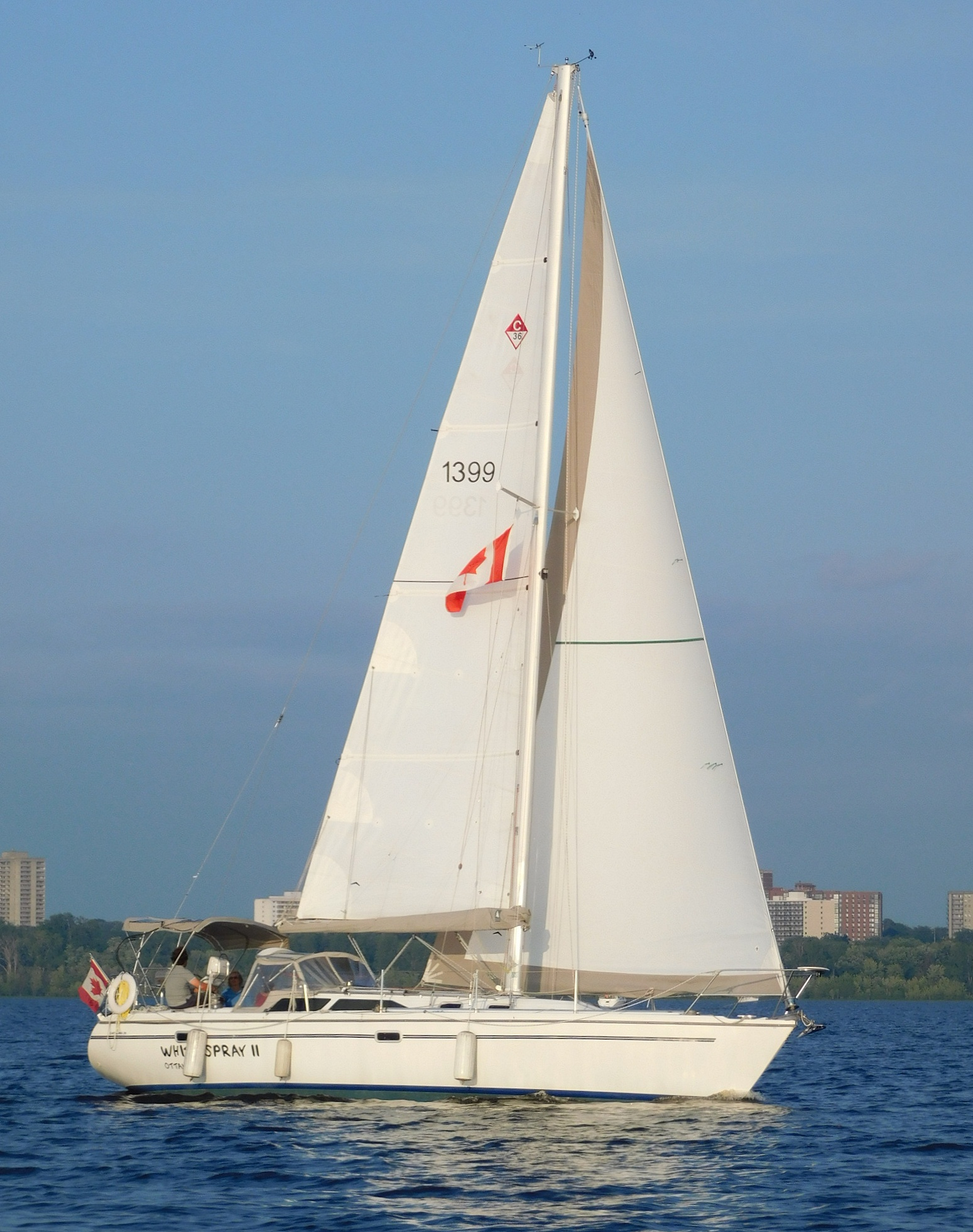
- Catalina 36 Mark II

Development
- Designer: Frank Butler and Gerry Douglas
- Location: United States
- Year: 1994
- Builder: Catalina Yachts
- Role: Cruiser
- Name: Catalina 36 Mark II

Boat
- Displacement: 15,000 lb (6,804 kg)
- Draft: 5.83 ft (1.78 m)

Hull
- Type: Monohull
- Construction: Fiberglass
- LOA: 35.58 ft (10.84 m)
- LWL: 30.25 ft (9.22 m)
- Beam: 11.92 ft (3.63 m)
- Engine: Universal 35 hp (26 kW) diesel engine

Hull appendages
- Keel: fin keel
- Ballast: 6,000 lb (2,722 kg)
- Rudder: internally-mounted spade-type rudder

Rig
- Rig type: Bermuda rig
- I foretriangle height: 44.75 ft (13.64 m)
- J foretriangle base: 14.33 ft (4.37 m)
- P mainsail luff: 39.00 ft (11.89 m)
- E mainsail foot: 12.00 ft (3.66 m)

Sails
- Sailplan: Masthead sloop
- Mainsail area: 234.00 sq ft (21.739 m^{2})
- Jib/genoa area: 320.63 sq ft (29.788 m^{2})
- Total sail area: 554.63 sq ft (51.527 m^{2})

The Catalina 36 is a family of American sailboats that was designed by Frank Butler and Gerry Douglas for cruising and first built in 1982. A Mark II version was introduced in 1994 and produced until 2005.

The design was replaced in the line by the Catalina 375 in 2008.

== Production ==
The design was built by Catalina Yachts in the United States, with 2305 built in total, but it is now out of production.

== Design ==
The Catalina 36 is a recreational keelboat, built predominantly of fiberglass, with wood trim. It has a masthead sloop rig, a raked stem, a raised reverse transom, an internally mounted spade-type rudder controlled by a wheel and a fixed fin keel or wing keel. All fin keel models displace 15,000 lb (6,804 kg) and carry 6,000 lb (2,722 kg) of ballast, while wing keel models displace 14,100 lb (6,396 kg).

Both models offered an optional tall rig for sailing in areas with light winds. The tall rig is approximately 2.0 ft (0.61 m) higher that the standard rig.

== Variants ==
Catalina 36
This model was designed by Frank Butler and introduced in 1982. A total of 1766 examples were produced. The boat has a draft of 5.30 ft (1.62 m) with the standard fin keel and 4.17 ft (1.27 m) with the optional shoal draft wing keel. The boat is fitted with an inboard engine. The fuel tank holds 25 U.S. gallons (95 L; 21 imp gal) and the fresh water tank has a capacity of 75 U.S. gallons (280 L; 62 imp gal).

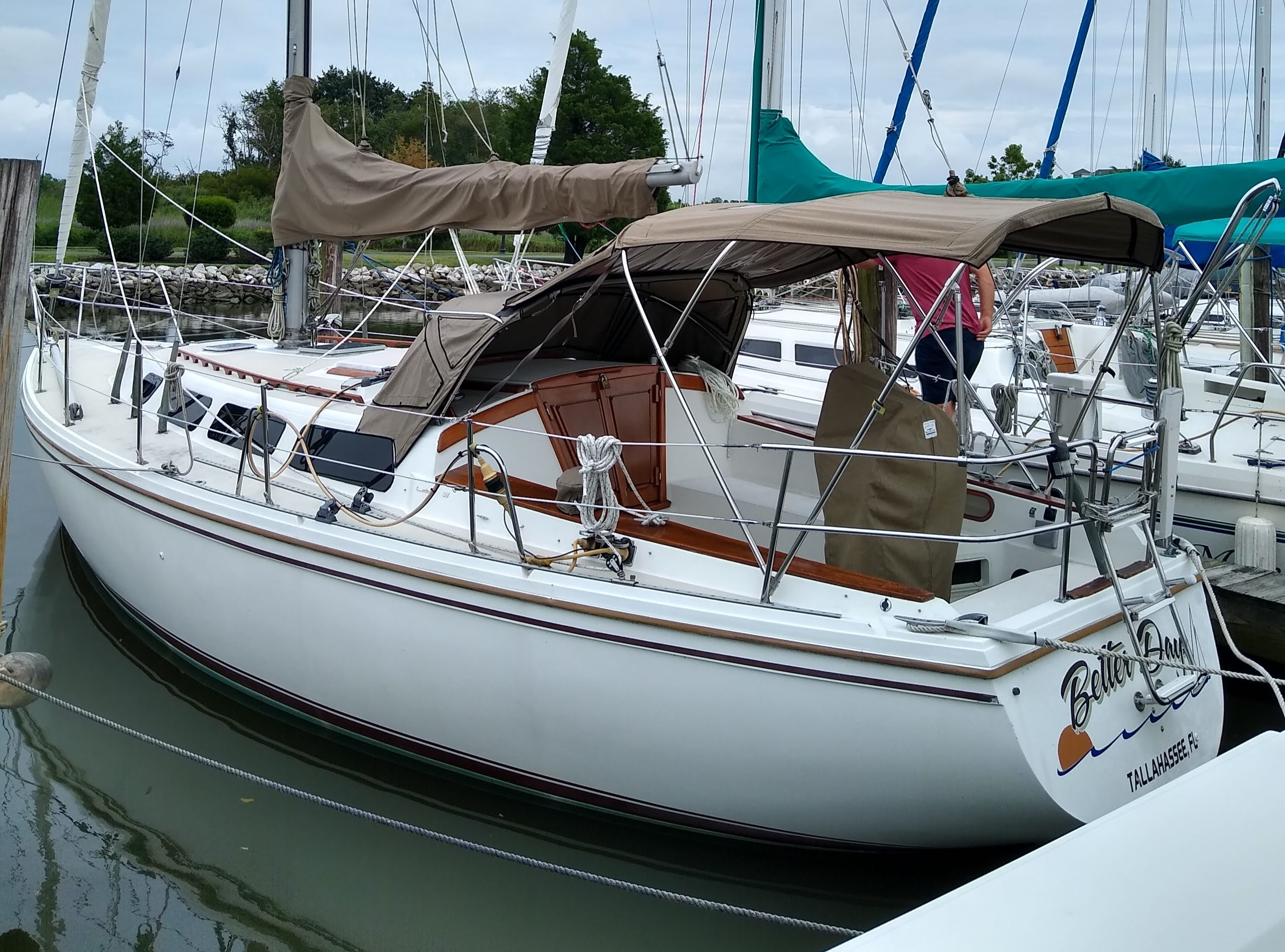
A 1983 Catalina 36

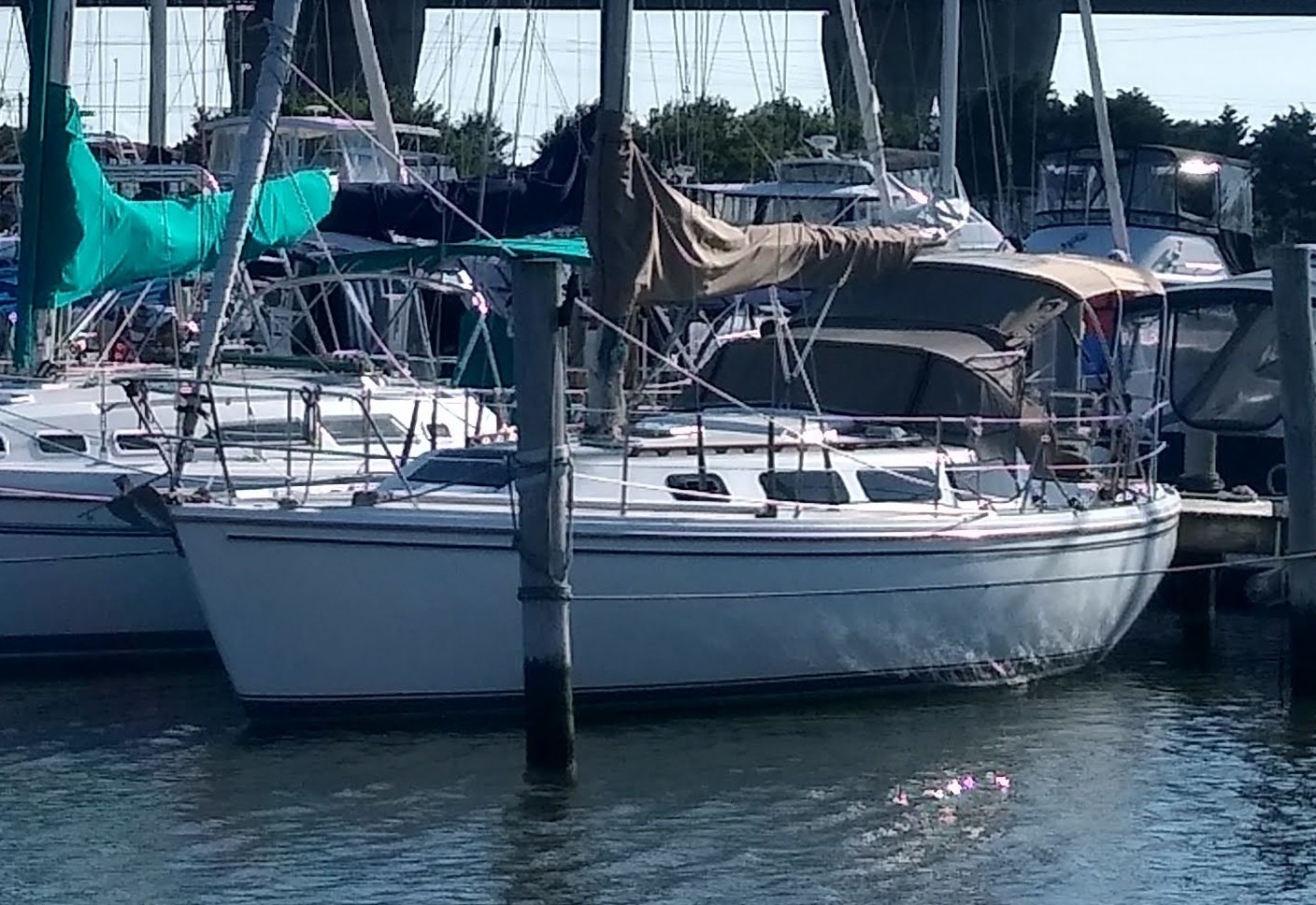
A 1983 Catalina 36 (right), with a Catalina 36 Mark II (left)

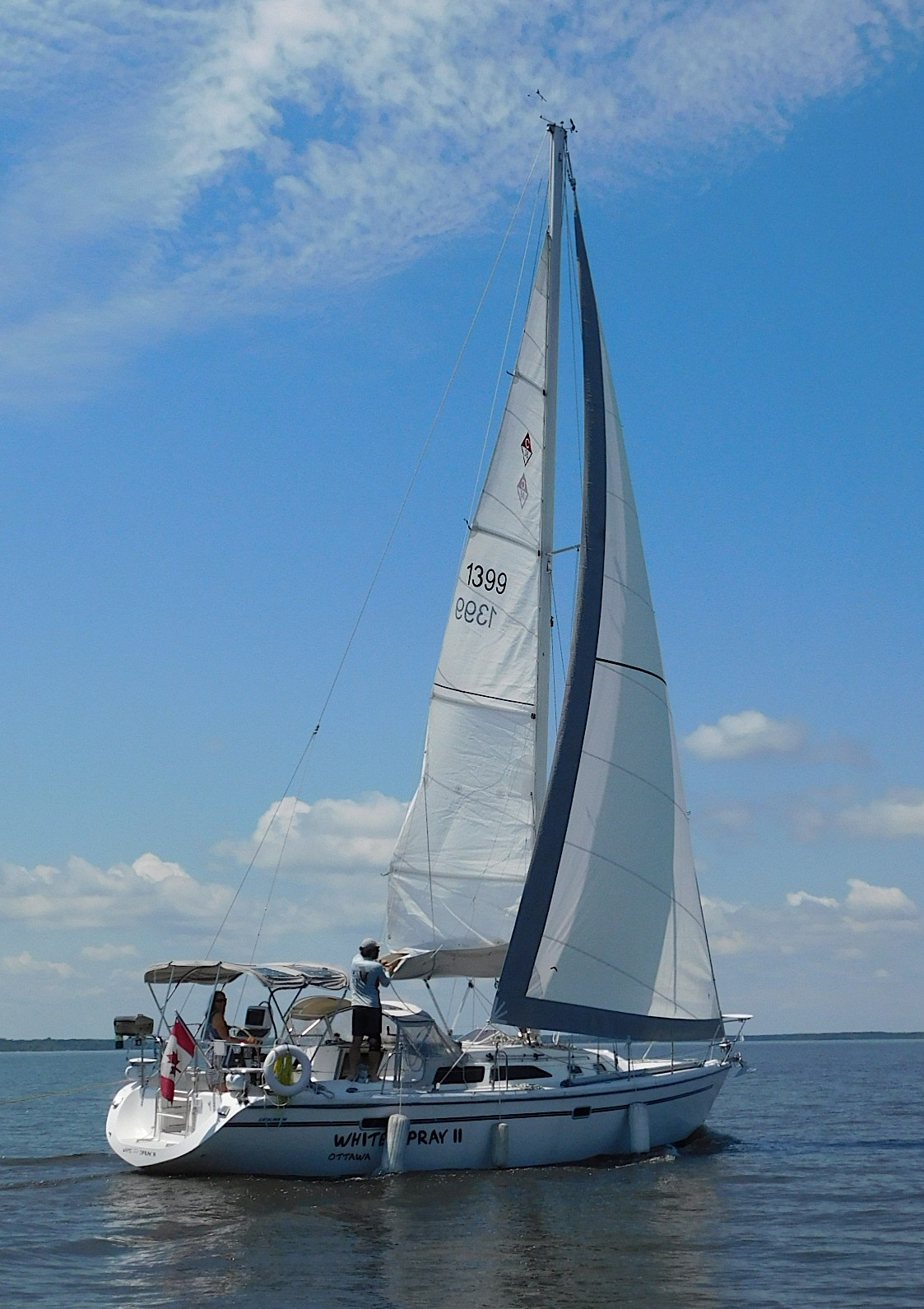
Catalina 36 Mark II showing the walk-through transom

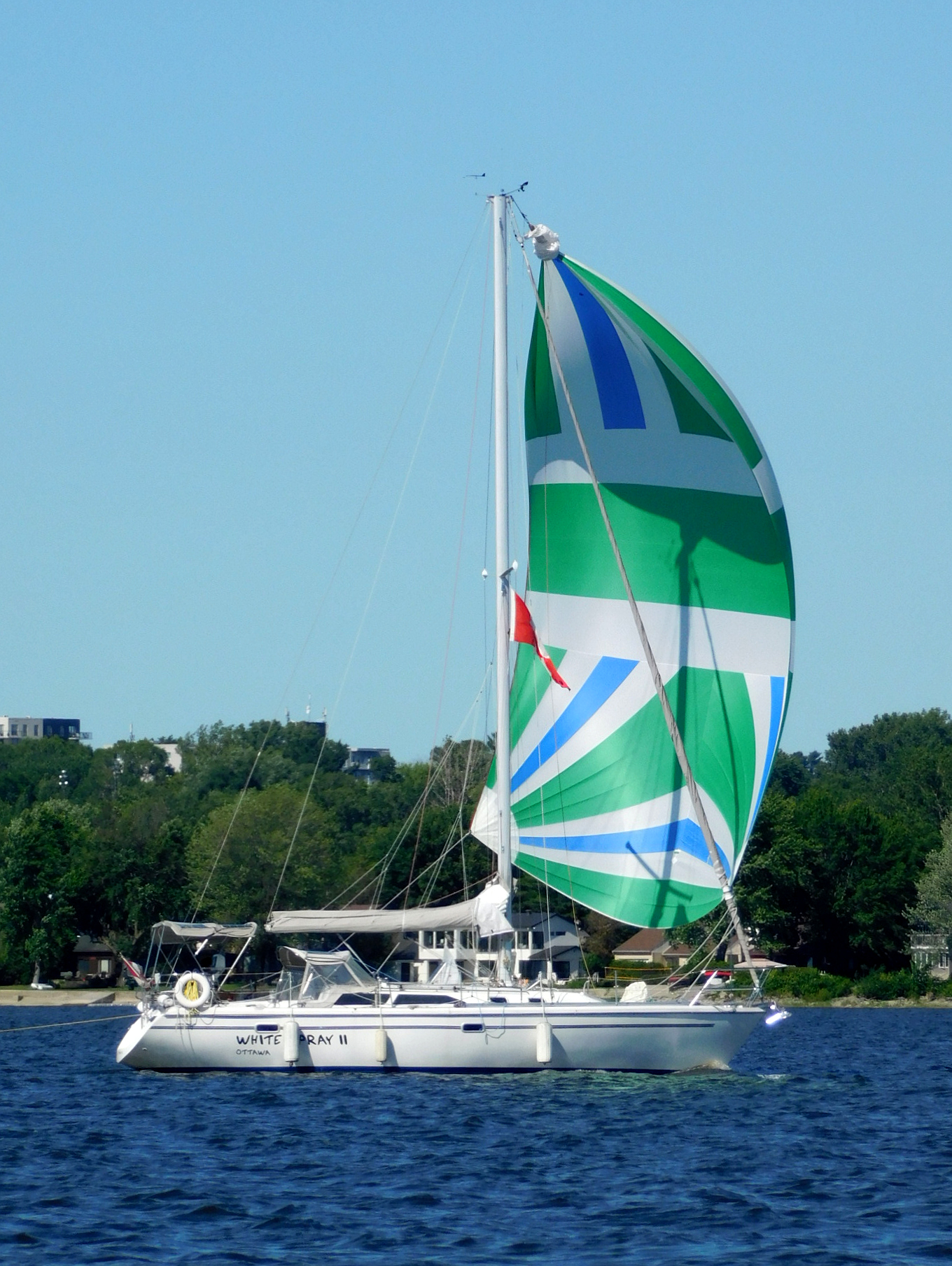
Catalina 36 Mark II with spinnaker flying

Catalina 36 Mark II
This model was designed by Frank Butler and Gerry Douglas, introduced in 1994 and was produced until 2005. The Mark II uses the same hull design and rig, but has a larger cockpit, different cabin ports, a walk-through transom and a new deck and interior design. The boat has a draft of 5.83 ft (1.78 m) with the standard fin keel and 4.52 ft (1.38 m) with the optional shoal draft wing keel. The boat is fitted with a Universal diesel engine of 35 hp (26 kW). The fuel tank holds 25 U.S. gallons (95 L; 21 imp gal) and the fresh water tank has a capacity of 75 U.S. gallons (280 L; 62 imp gal).

== Operational history ==
A 2012 review by naval architect Jack Hornor wrote, "With nearly 3,000 boats sold over the first 26 years, the Catalina 36 is arguably the most popular sailboat of this size ever built ... All things considered, the pros certainly outweigh the cons for anyone looking for an affordable cruising boat in the 36-foot size range."

In a 2015 review of the Mark II in Sailing magazine, writer Bob Pingel stated, "the Catalina 36 hits a sweet spot among weekend cruisers. It’s big enough to be comfortable and capable, but small enough to easily manage it shorthanded and it comes at an approachable price."

Jake Firth of Sailing Today did a review of the Mark II. He praised the cockpit size, cabin and the handling, but faulted the high prices the used boats fetch, the lack of cabin top winches and lack of accessible stowage. He wrote, "there’s the common concern that anything built in volume is likely to be cheap and nasty with poor standards of fit, finish and standard equipment. Well, I had a good poke around Katie, Derek Savage’s 2006 C-36 MkII, and though some of the plywood hidden inside drawers and the like wasn’t the closest grained, best quality stuff I’ve ever seen, the bits that really cost and matter, like deck hardware and rigging, appeared to be of ample size and reasonable quality."

== See also ==
- List of sailing boat types

Similar sailboats

- Bayfield 36
- Beneteau 361
- C&C 36-1
- C&C 36R
- C&C 110
- Columbia 36
- Coronado 35
- CS 36
- Ericson 36
- Frigate 36
- Hinterhoeller F3
- Hunter 36
- Hunter 36-2
- Hunter 36 Legend
- Hunter 36 Vision
- Invader 36
- Islander 36
- Nonsuch 36
- Portman 36
- S2 11.0
- Seidelmann 37
- Vancouver 36 (Harris)
- Watkins 36
- Watkins 36C
