= Hunter 36 =

Sailboat class

Development
- Designer: John Cherubini
- Location: United States
- Year: 1980
- Builder: Hunter Marine
- Name: Hunter 36

Boat
- Displacement: 13,500 lb (6,123 kg)
- Draft: 4.92 ft (1.50 m)

Hull
- Type: Monohull
- Construction: Fiberglass
- LOA: 35.92 ft (10.95 m)
- LWL: 29.50 ft (8.99 m)
- Beam: 11.08 ft (3.38 m)
- Engine: Diesel inboard motor

Hull appendages
- Keel: fin keel
- Ballast: 6,000 lb (2,722 kg)
- Rudder: internally-mounted spade-type rudder

Rig
- Rig type: Bermuda rig
- I foretriangle height: 46.50 ft (14.17 m)
- J foretriangle base: 14.75 ft (4.50 m)
- P mainsail luff: 41.00 ft (12.50 m)
- E mainsail foot: 12.75 ft (3.89 m)

Sails
- Sailplan: Masthead sloop
- Mainsail area: 261.38 sq ft (24.283 m^{2})
- Jib/genoa area: 342.94 sq ft (31.860 m^{2})
- Total sail area: 604.31 sq ft (56.142 m^{2})

The Hunter 36 is an American sailboat that was designed by John Cherubini as a cruising sailboat and first built in 1980.

The design can be confused with the 1990 Hunter 36 Vision, 2008 Hunter 36-2 (sold as the Hunter 36) and the 2001 Hunter 36 Legend, all sailboats with similar names by the same builder.

== Production ==
The design was built by Hunter Marine in the United States between 1980-1983, but it is now out of production.

== Design ==
The Hunter 36 is a recreational keelboat, built predominantly of fiberglass, with wood trim. It has a masthead sloop rig, a raked stem, a raised reverse transom, an internally-mounted spade-type rudder controlled by a wheel and a fixed fin keel. It displaces 13,500 lb (6,123 kg) and carries 6,000 lb (2,722 kg) of ballast.

The boat has a draft of 4.92 ft (1.50 m) with the standard keel fitted. The boat is fitted with an inboard diesel engine.

The design features two private cabins, one forward and one aft, a head with a shower, a U-shaped dining area which converts to a berth, a galley with an oven and a two-burner stove, plus an icebox that can be accessed from the cockpit while under way. The jib is roller furling and dual two-speed, self-tailing winches are provided as standard equipment.

The design has a hull speed of 7.28 kn (13.48 km/h).

== See also ==
- List of sailing boat types

Related development

- Hunter 34

Similar sailboats

- Bayfield 36
- Beneteau 361
- C&C 36-1
- C&C 36R
- C&C 110
- Catalina 36
- Columbia 36
- Coronado 35
- CS 36
- Ericson 36
- Frigate 36
- Hinterhoeller F3
- Hunter 36-2
- Hunter 36 Legend
- Hunter 36 Vision
- Invader 36
- Islander 36
- Nonsuch 36
- Portman 36
- S2 11.0
- Seidelmann 37
- Vancouver 36 (Harris)
- Watkins 36
- Watkins 36C
