= Displacement–length ratio =

Ship measurement

The displacement–length ratio (DLR or D/L ratio) is a calculation used to express how heavy a boat is relative to its waterline length.

DLR was first published in Taylor, David W. (1910). The Speed and Power of Ships: A Manual of Marine Propulsion. John Wiley & Sons. p. 99.

It is calculated by dividing a boat's displacement in long tons (2,240 pounds) by the cube of one one-hundredth of the waterline length (in feet):

$$\mathit{DLR} = \frac{\mathit{displacement}(\mathrm{lb}) ~/~ 2240} {(0.01 \times \mathit{LWL}(\mathrm{ft}))^3}$$

DLR can be used to compare the relative mass of various boats no matter what their length. A DLR less than 200 is indicative of a racing boat, while a DLR greater than 300 or so is indicative of a heavy cruising boat.

Displacement	DLR
ultralight	under 90
light	90 to 180
moderate	180 to 270
heavy	270 to 360
ultraheavy	360 and up

== See also ==
- Sail Area-Displacement ratio
