= C&C 36R =

Sailboat class

Development
- Designer: C&C Design
- Location: Canada
- Year: 1971
- Builder: C&C Yachts
- Name: C&C 36R

Boat
- Displacement: 12,700 lb (5,761 kg)
- Draft: 6.00 ft (1.83 m)

Hull
- Type: Monohull
- Construction: Fiberglass
- LOA: 35.08 ft (10.69 m)
- LWL: 30.50 ft (9.30 m)
- Beam: 11.17 ft (3.40 m)
- Engine: Inboard engine

Hull appendages
- Keel: fin keel
- Ballast: 6,030 lb (2,735 kg)
- Rudder: Transom-mounted rudder

Rig
- Rig type: Bermuda rig

Sails
- Sailplan: Masthead sloop
- Total sail area: 632 sq ft (58.7 m^{2})

The C&C 36R is a Canadian sailboat, that was designed by C&C Design and first built in 1971.

== Production ==
The boat was built by C&C Yachts in Canada, starting in 1971, but it is now out of production.

== Design ==
The C&C 36R is a small recreational keelboat, built predominantly of fiberglass, with wood trim. It has a masthead sloop rig, a transom-hung rudder, vertical transom and a fixed swept fin keel. It displaces 12,700 lb (5,761 kg) and carries 6,030 lb (2,735 kg) of ballast.

The boat has a draft of 6.00 ft (1.83 m) with the standard keel fitted and is fitted with an inboard engine.

The design has a hull speed of 7.4 kn (13.70 km/h).

== See also ==
- List of sailing boat types

Similar sailboats

- Bayfield 36
- Beneteau 361
- C&C 34/36
- C&C 35
- C&C 110
- Catalina 36
- Columbia 36
- Coronado 35
- Ericson 36
- Express 35
- Frigate 36
- Goderich 35
- Hinterhoeller F3
- Hughes 36
- Hughes-Columbia 36
- Hunter 35 Legend
- Hunter 35.5 Legend
- Hunter 36
- Hunter 36-2
- Hunter 36 Legend
- Hunter 36 Vision
- Invader 36
- Islander 36
- Mirage 35
- Nonsuch 36
- Portman 36
- Seidelmann 37
- Vancouver 36 (Harris)
- Watkins 36
- Watkins 36C
