= George Hinterhoeller =

Canadian boat designer and builder

George Anton Hinterhoeller
- Born: March 16, 1928; Mondsee, Austria
- Died: March 18, 1999 (aged 71); Niagara-on-the-Lake, Ontario, Canada
- Occupations: boat designer and builder
- Spouse: Nona
- Children: Gabrielle, Richard and Barbara
- Awards: Doctor of Laws by Brock University; 2011 Legends of Ontario Sailing Award

George Anton Hinterhoeller (1928–1999) was a Canadian boat designer and builder, a significant contributor to the Canadian sailboat industry for almost forty years.

== Early life ==
Hinterhoeller was born in Mondsee, Austria on March 16, 1928. He first sailed at the age of 8.

== Career ==
Hinterhoeller apprenticed and developed his trade as a master boat builder before eventually emigrating to Canada in 1952, where he was employed building powerboats at Shepherd Boats in Niagara-on-the-Lake, Ontario. He designed and built sailboats in his spare time. By 1956 he was taking numerous orders for the Y-Flyer one-design. He built 40 before “the market dried up.”

In 1959, Hinterhoeller built a 22-foot plywood sloop called TEETER-TOTTER, which he hoped would "go like hell when the wind blew". It did exactly that, and there was demand from others to buy copies of the racer. He increased the design by two feet and called the new boat the Shark 24. Though the first few were plywood, an early customer insisted his be built with fiberglass and the design was changed to the cheaper material, helping to spur the growth of sailboats for "the masses".

In 1969, Hinterhoeller merged his operation with three other companies: Belleville Marine Yard, Bruckmann Manufacturing, and the design partnership of George Cuthbertson and George Cassian, to form C&C Yachts. Hinterhoeller was in charge of "production shop" and Bruckmann the "custom shop". The new company took over manufacturing of the Shark 24 along with numerous other new designs including the very popular C&C 27. Hinterhoeller left C&C in 1976, and refounded Hinterhoeller Yachts which created, among other designs, popular series of catboat called the Nonsuch, of which there are nearly 1000 in existence.

== Death ==
George Hinterhoeller died of a heart attack in Niagara-on-the-Lake on March 18, 1999, at age 71. His legacy lives on primarily in thousands of sailboats. The largest number of any one design is the Shark, of which there are more than 2500 vessels primarily in the Great Lakes region and in Europe.

== Awards ==
George Hinterhoeller was awarded an honorary Doctor of Laws by Brock University or his contributions to "sailing, yacht construction and job creation" at the Spring Convocation on 4 June 1982.

George Hinterhoeller was awarded the Canadian Yachting Magazine, Ontario Sailing, 2011 Legends of Ontario Sailing Award as one of the “Builders of C&C Yachts”

== Hinterhoeller archive ==
The Marine Museum of the Great Lakes in Kingston, Ontario has in its archives the personal drawings and files of noted Canadian boat builder and designer George Hinterhoeller, the donation thanks to his son Richard Hinterhoeller and Hinterhoeller's widow Nona Hinterhoeller.

== Boat designs ==
- Cygnus 20 – 1965
- GT-26 (Hinterhoeller) – 1983
- Hinterhoeller 25 – 1969
- Hinterhoeller 28 – 1967
- Hinterhoeller 30 – 1969
- HR-25 (Hinterhoeller) – 1969
- HR-28 (Hinterhoeller) – 1967
- Niagara 26 – 1975
- Niagara 30 – 1967
- Shark 24 – 1959

== See also ==
- List of sailboat designers and manufacturers
