= Columbia 36 =

Sailboat class

Development
- Designer: William Crealock
- Location: United States
- Year: 1967
- No. built: 400
- Builder: Columbia Yachts
- Name: Columbia 36

Boat
- Displacement: 12,000 lb (5,443 kg)
- Draft: 5.42 ft (1.65 m)

Hull
- Type: Monohull
- Construction: Fiberglass
- LOA: 35.75 ft (10.90 m)
- LWL: 27.75 ft (8.46 m)
- Beam: 10.50 ft (3.20 m)
- Engine: Palmer M-60 gasoline engine

Hull appendages
- Keel: fin keel
- Ballast: 5,000 lb (2,268 kg)
- Rudder: internally-mounted spade-type rudder

Rig
- Rig type: Bermuda rig
- I foretriangle height: 41.80 ft (12.74 m)
- J foretriangle base: 15.00 ft (4.57 m)
- P mainsail luff: 34.70 ft (10.58 m)
- E mainsail foot: 14.00 ft (4.27 m)

Sails
- Sailplan: Masthead sloop
- Mainsail area: 242.90 sq ft (22.566 m^{2})
- Jib/genoa area: 313.50 sq ft (29.125 m^{2})
- Total sail area: 556.40 sq ft (51.691 m^{2})

The Columbia 36 is an American sailboat that was designed by William Crealock and first built in 1967.

== Production ==
The design was built by Columbia Yachts in the United States. The original Columbia 36 design was built from 1967 to 1972, with 400 completed, while the Mark II was produced from 1970.

== Design ==
The Columbia 36 is a recreational keelboat, built predominantly of fiberglass, with wood trim. It has a masthead sloop rig, a raked stem, a raised transom, an internally mounted spade-type rudder and a fixed fin keel.

The design has a hull speed of 7.06 kn (13.08 km/h).

== Variants ==
Columbia 36
This model was introduced in 1967. It has a length overall of 35.75 ft (10.9 m), a waterline length of 27.75 ft (8.5 m), displaces 12,000 lb (5,443 kg) and carries 5,000 lb (2,268 kg) of lead ballast. The boat has a draft of 5.42 ft (1.65 m) with the standard keel fitted. The boat is fitted with a Palmer M-60 gasoline engine. The fuel tank holds 29 U.S. gallons (110 L; 24 imp gal) and the fresh water tank has a capacity of 33 U.S. gallons (120 L; 27 imp gal).
Sailcrafter 36
Kit built version of the Colombia 36, for amateur construction.
Columbia 36 Mark II
This model was introduced in 1970. It has a length overall of 36.17 ft (11.0 m), a waterline length of 27.75 ft (8.5 m), displaces 13,200 lb (5,987 kg) and carries 5,000 lb (2,268 kg) of ballast. The boat has a draft of 5.25 ft (1.60 m) with the standard keel fitted. The boat is fitted with a Universal Atomic 4 gasoline engine. The fuel tank holds 29 U.S. gallons (110 L; 24 imp gal) and the fresh water tank has a capacity of 100 U.S. gallons (380 L; 83 imp gal).

== See also ==
- List of sailing boat types

Similar sailboats

- Bayfield 36
- Beneteau 361
- C&C 36-1
- C&C 36R
- Catalina 36
- Coronado 35
- CS 36
- Ericson 36
- Frigate 36
- Hinterhoeller F3
- Hunter 36
- Hunter 36-2
- Hunter 36 Legend
- Hunter 36 Vision
- Invader 36
- Islander 36
- Nonsuch 36
- S2 11.0
- Seidelmann 37
- Vancouver 36 (Harris)
