= Marlow-Hunter 37 =

Sailboat class

Development
- Designer: Glenn Henderson
- Location: United States
- Year: 2014
- Builder: Marlow-Hunter
- Name: Marlow-Hunter 37

Boat
- Displacement: 18,995 lb (8,616 kg)
- Draft: 5.00 ft (1.52 m)

Hull
- Type: Monohull
- Construction: Fiberglass
- LOA: 39.08 ft (11.91 m)
- LWL: 35.67 ft (10.87 m)
- Beam: 13.08 ft (3.99 m)
- Engine: Yanmar 29 hp (22 kW) diesel engine

Hull appendages
- Keel: shoal draft keel
- Ballast: 5,727 lb (2,598 kg)
- Rudder: internally-mounted spade-type rudder

Rig
- Rig type: Bermuda rig

Sails
- Sailplan: Fractional B&R rigged sloop
- Total sail area: 856 sq ft (79.5 m^{2})

The Marlow-Hunter 37 (known as the Marlow Legend 37 in the UK) is an American sailboat that was designed by Glenn Henderson as a cruiser and first built in 2014.

The Marlow-Hunter 37 can be confused with the 1978 Hunter 37 and the 1986 Hunter 37 Legend designs, which have similar designations.

== Production ==
The design was built by Marlow-Hunter in the United States, starting in 2014 and remained in production through 2019.

== Design ==
The Marlow-Hunter 37 is a recreational keelboat, built predominantly of vinyl ester fiberglass, with Kevlar reinforcing and a Nida honeycomb core above the waterline. The hull has a bow hollow and a hard chine design. It has a fractional sloop B&R rig, a nearly plumb stem, a reverse transom with a fold-down swimming platform and telescoping ladder, an internally mounted spade-type rudder controlled by a wheel and a fixed shoal draft or deep fin keel. The shoal draft model displaces 18,995 lb (8,616 kg) and carries 5,727 lb (2,598 kg) of cast iron ballast, while the deep fin keel version carries 5,125 lb (2,325 kg) of ballast. Lead keels are optional. In the UK a third keel option is available, a twin keel. The below decks headroom is 6.5 ft (2.0 m).

The boat has a draft of 6.5 ft (2.0 m) with the deep-draft keel and 5.00 ft (1.52 m) with the shoal draft keel.

The boat is fitted with a Japanese Yanmar diesel engine of 29 hp (22 kW), with a 40 hp (30 kW) Yanmar optional. The fuel tank holds 50 U.S. gallons (190 L; 42 imp gal) and the fresh water tank has a capacity of 80 U.S. gallons (300 L; 67 imp gal). The holding tank has a capacity of 25 U.S. gallons (95 L; 21 imp gal).

Factory standard equipment includes a 110% jib, the mainsheet traveler mounted on a stainless steel arch, fold-down cleats, American cherry and teak interior woodwork, five flush-mounted deck hatches with bug screens, two dorade vents, folding cockpit table, electric anchor winch, marine VHF radio, knotmeter, depth sounder, stereo system, dual bow anchor rollers, LED cabin lighting, Corian countertops, fully enclosed head with shower, private forward and aft cabins, a dinette table that converts to a berth, microwave oven, dual sinks, refrigerator and freezer, and a two-burner gimbaled liquid petroleum gas stove and oven. Factory options include a roller furling genoa and mast-furling mainsail, a folding steering wheel, bow thruster, sprung mattresses and a gennaker.

== Operational history ==
American reviewer, Mark Pillsbury, writing in Cruising World, noted the spacious accommodations and large galley and noted its suitability as a coastal cruising boat.

In a 2015 review in Canadian Yachting, writer Robin Ball described the sailing characteristics of the design, "Sailing this boat is easy. The furling jib and furling main make deploying sails a pleasure. There is no lifting of sails, no sail bags to unzip and no need to leave the cockpit. Our test boat carried a vertically battened main. In 12-14 knots of true wind and a small chop the boat handled very nicely, close-hauled with 18 — 20 apparent we were moving along nicely at 7.5 to 8 knots. The concave shape of the bow section of the hull is intended to reduce pitching by helping to cut through the waves. The chine carried from the beam all the way aft helps to provide stability. In those conditions we were heeled 10-15° with about 10° of weather helm rudder carrying full sail area. The B&R designed rig has no backstay eliminating interference with the roach on the main. There is also no baby stay for the jib to foul on. Tacking was quick and simple and visibility was great with the 110% jib. I am a fan of boom end sheeting, I like the control it provides of the boom and the shape of the sail. As designed, the arch with its mainsheet traveller provides excellent control, within reach of the helm, and with everything overhead out of the way and with the dual ended mainsheet, the helmsman didn't have to leave the helm making this boat very easy to single hand. When we cracked off a little on a close reach, the helm was more neutral. On a beam reach with the wind down slightly, we maintained 6 — 6.5 knots of speed and the helm was balanced. Downwind, the small jib has trouble behind this main driven rig."

Australian reviewer Phillip Ross, writing in Cruising Helmsman magazine, noted the generous number of cockpit cupholders, the below decks craftsmanship and fit, as well as the spacious interior. He compared the accommodations to those found on a 40-feet boat.

British reviewer Rupert Holmes noted the spacious galley. Of the design he wrote: "it’s very much a cruiser, with no pretensions towards the performance cruising end of the spectrum."

== See also ==
- List of sailing boat types

Similar sailboats

- Alberg 37
- Baltic 37
- C&C 37
- C&C 110
- CS 36
- Dickerson 37
- Dockrell 37
- Express 37
- Hunter 36-2
- Nor'Sea 37
