= C&C 110 =

Sailboat class

Development
- Designer: Tim Jackett
- Location: United States
- Year: 1999
- Builder: C&C Yachts
- Name: C&C 110

Boat
- Displacement: 10,900 lb (4,944 kg)
- Draft: 6.50 ft (1.98 m)

Hull
- Type: Monohull
- Construction: Fiberglass
- LOA: 36.33 ft (11.07 m)
- LWL: 31.50 ft (9.60 m)
- Beam: 12.00 ft (3.66 m)
- Engine: inboard

Hull appendages
- Keel: fin keel
- Ballast: 4,200 lb (1,905 kg)
- Rudder: internally-mounted spade-type rudder

Rig
- General: Masthead sloop
- I foretriangle height: 51.00 ft (15.54 m)
- J foretriangle base: 14.00 ft (4.27 m)
- P mainsail luff: 45.00 ft (13.72 m)
- E mainsail foot: 15.50 ft (4.72 m)

Sails
- Mainsail area: 348.75 sq ft (32.400 m^{2})
- Jib/genoa area: 357.00 sq ft (33.166 m^{2})
- Total sail area: 705.75 sq ft (65.566 m^{2})

Racing
- PHRF: 81 (average)

The C&C 110, originally called the 110 Express at introduction, is an American sailboat, that was designed by Tim Jackett and entered production in 1999.

== Production ==
The boat was built by C&C Yachts in the United States, starting in 1999, but it is now out of production.

== Design ==
The C&C 110 is a small recreational keelboat, built predominantly of fiberglass. It has a masthead sloop rig, an internally-mounted spade-type rudder and a fixed fin keel. It displaces 10,900 lb (4,944 kg) and carries 4,200 lb (1,905 kg) of lead ballast.

The first examples built were made with vinylester resin, but in 2002, this was changed to a post cure epoxy to reduce weight. The rudder section was also altered to give better control in higher winds.

The initial standard rig was made by Offshore Spars and was configured with triple spreaders and rod rigging. This was later changed a double spreader rig with wire rigging made by Seldén Mast AB of Sweden, but the Offshore Spars triple spreader rig remained optional. The standard rig was changed to a carbon fiber one in 2004.

A 5 ft (1.52 m) bowsprit was also a factory option.

The design had a choice of keels. When introduced in 1999 there was an option of a standard keel with a draft of 6.00 ft (1.83 m), a shoal draft keel with a draft of 4.83 ft (1.47 m) and a deep keel with a draft of 7.25 ft (2.21 m). In 2001 a newly designed "high performance keel" was introduced with a draft of 6.50 ft (1.98 m) and the deep draft keel was dropped as an option.

The boat was fitted with an inboard engine. Its fuel tank holds 26 U.S. gallons (98 L; 22 imp gal) and the fresh water tank has a capacity of 70 U.S. gallons (260 L; 58 imp gal).

The boat has a PHRF racing average handicap of 81 with a high of 93 and low of 75. It has a hull speed of 7.52 kn (13.93 km/h).

== See also ==
- List of sailing boat types

Similar sailboats

- Alberg 37
- Baltic 37
- Beneteau 361
- C&C 36-1
- C&C 36R
- C&C 37
- Catalina 36
- Dickerson 37
- Dockrell 37
- Ericson 36
- Express 37
- Frigate 36
- Hunter 36
- Hunter 36-2
- Hunter 36 Legend
- Hunter 36 Vision
- Invader 36
- Islander 36
- Marlow-Hunter 37
- Nonsuch 36
- Nor'Sea 37
