= Tayana 37 =

Sailboat class

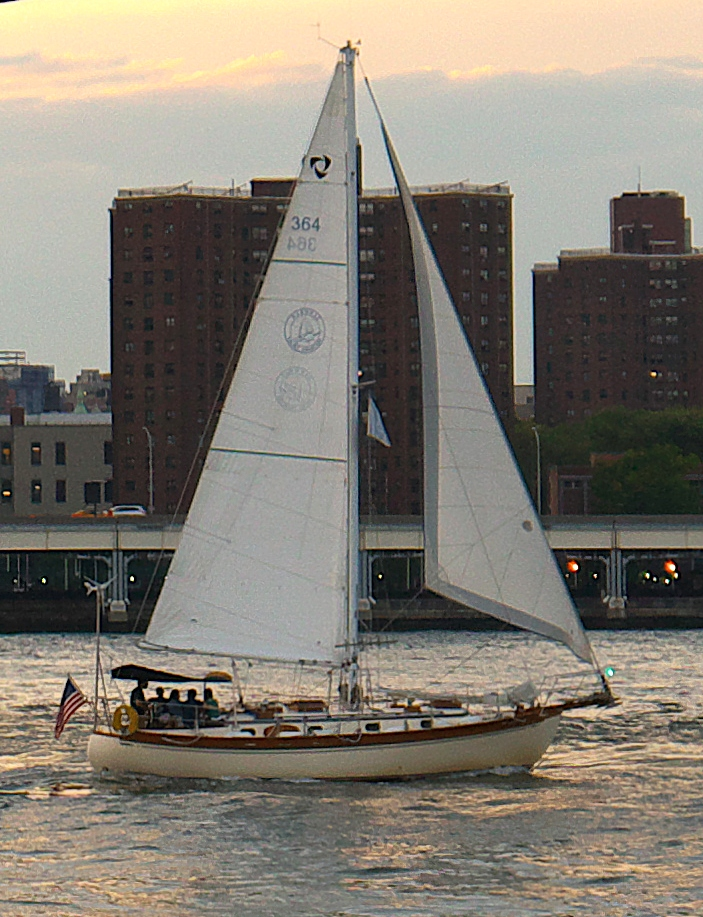

Development
- Designer: Robert Perry
- Location: Taiwan
- Year: 1976
- No. built: 588
- Builder: Ta Yang Yacht Building
- Role: Cruiser
- Name: Tayana 37

Boat
- Displacement: 22,500 lb (10,206 kg)
- Draft: 5.67 ft (1.73 m)

Hull
- Type: Monohull
- Construction: Fiberglass
- LOA: 36.67 ft (11.18 m)
- LWL: 31.00 ft (9.45 m)
- Beam: 11.60 ft (3.54 m)
- Engine: Yanmar 33 hp (25 kW) diesel engine

Hull appendages
- Keel: modified long keel
- Ballast: 8,000 lb (3,629 kg)
- Rudder: keel-mounted rudder

Rig
- Rig type: Cutter rig
- I foretriangle height: 50.80 ft (15.48 m)
- J foretriangle base: 19.50 ft (5.94 m)
- P mainsail luff: 45.30 ft (13.81 m)
- E mainsail foot: 15.50 ft (4.72 m)

Sails
- Sailplan: Cutter rigged sloop
- Mainsail area: 351.08 sq ft (32.616 m^{2})
- Jib/genoa area: 495.30 sq ft (46.015 m^{2})
- Total sail area: 846.38 sq ft (78.631 m^{2})

Racing
- PHRF: 126

The Tayana 37 is a Taiwanese sailboat that was designed by American Robert Perry as a cruiser and first built in 1976.

The design was originally commissioned by Will Eckert, of Flying Dutchman Yachts and C.T. Chen, of Ta Yang Yacht Building. The latter bought the rights to the design and commenced production as the CT 37. It was initially called the Ta Chiao 37 and then the Ta Yang 37, before the name was changed to the Tayana 37.

== Production ==
The design is built by Ta Yang Yacht Building, under the Tayana Yachts brand in Taiwan. The company had built 588 boats by 2012 and the design remained available for orders in 2020.

== Design ==
The Tayana 37 is a recreational keelboat, built predominantly of fiberglass, with teak wood trim, including teak decks. It is a cutter rigged sloop, with a few built with the optional ketch rig. The boat has spruce or aluminum spars and a bowsprit that brings the length to 42.17 ft (12.85 m). A pilothouse was also optional. The design has a spooned raked stem, a canoe transom, a keel-mounted rudder controlled by a wheel and a fixed modified long keel, with a cutaway forefoot. It displaces 22,500 lb (10,206 kg) and carries 8,000 lb (3,629 kg) of iron ballast.

The boat has a draft of 5.67 ft (1.73 m) with the standard keel.

The boat is fitted with a Japanese Yanmar diesel engine of 33 hp (25 kW) for docking and maneuvering. The fuel tank holds 90 U.S. gallons (340 L; 75 imp gal) and the fresh water tank has a capacity of 100 U.S. gallons (380 L; 83 imp gal).

The design interior arrangement varies based on the rig and customer preferences. A typical configuration has sleeping accommodation for seven people, with a double "V"-berth in the bow cabin, a U-shaped settee with a drop-down dinette table and a straight settee in the main cabin, with a pilot berth above and an aft cabin with a double berth on the starboard side. The galley is located on the port side just forward of the companionway ladder. The galley is U-shaped and is equipped with a three-burner propane-fired stove, an oven and a double sink. A navigation station is opposite the galley, on the starboard side. The head is located just aft of the bow cabin on the port side and includes a shower, with a teak floor grating, plus hot and cold pressurized water. The interior trim and doors are all made from teak.

Ventilation is provided by eleven bronze ports, a teak forward hatch and a teak-framed skylight.

For sailing the design is equipped with two travelers, including a staysail traveler, as the staysail is boom-mounted and a mainsheet traveler. There are two winches for the jib sheets, one for the jib, one for the mainsheet and three for the three sail halyards. There are jib tracks mounted on the toe rails, plus outboard shrouds.

The design has a PHRF racing average handicap of 126.

== Operational history ==
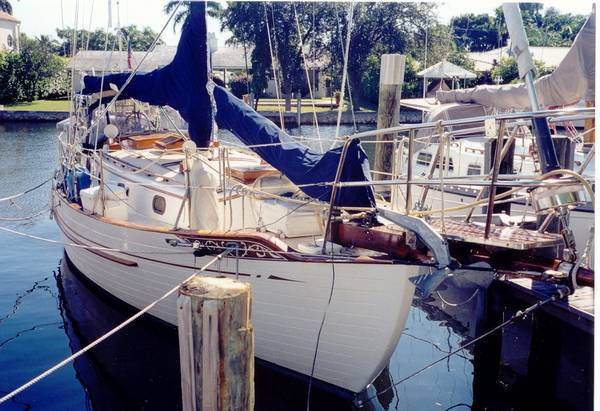
Tayana 37

In a 1994 review Richard Sherwood wrote that the "Tayana [37] is in many respects — perhaps except for the double-ended design — typical of the many high-performance designs built today that retain a traditional appearance."

In a 2019 review, Charles Doane wrote, "the Tayana 37 is the most successful of the many Taiwan-built double-ended full-keel cruisers that were conceived in the mid-1970s in the wake of the great success of the Westsail 32 ... This boat is quite heavy by today's standards, but it sails remarkably well and can serve effectively as both a coastal and bluewater cruiser. It has a particularly strong reputation as an offshore boat and is certainly one of the more popular bluewater cruisers ever built. Reportedly at any given time there are more Tayana 37s out there wandering the globe than any other single type of sailboat."

Writing a review in 2012 Steve Knauth noted, "the Tayana 37 is distinguished most by its double-ended hull. The deep, full-keel bottom is designed for bluewater cruising, and the vessel’s 22,500-pound displacement includes 8,000 pounds of outside ballast. Construction is solid, hand-laid fiberglass. Designer Robert Perry drew up two twin-headstay rigs, and the boat was rigged either as a cutter or ketch. Both versions carry large sail plans — the cutter more than 800 square feet, the ketch more than 750. They’re based on a high aspect mainsail for upwind work and twin headsails for versatility. The deck profile shows a traditional trunk cabin ahead of a roomy aft cockpit with pedestal steering and controls, surrounded by a high coaming. Bow and stern pulpits are joined by double lifelines with both port and starboard gates. There’s also a pilothouse deck plan with a protected steering station."

== See also ==
- List of sailing boat types

Similar sailboats

- Alberg 37
- Baltic 37
- C&C 37
- CS 36
- Dickerson 37
- Dockrell 37
- Endeavour 37
- Express 37
- Nor'Sea 37
