= Baltic 37 =

Sailboat class

Development
- Designer: Robert W. Ball, C&C Design
- Location: Finland
- Year: 1978
- No. built: 51
- Builder: Baltic Yachts
- Role: Racer-Cruiser
- Name: Baltic 37

Boat
- Displacement: 13,600 lb (6,169 kg)
- Draft: 6.67 ft (2.03 m)

Hull
- Type: Monohull
- Construction: Fibreglass
- LOA: 37.00 ft (11.28 m)
- LWL: 27.25 ft (8.31 m)
- Beam: 12.00 ft (3.66 m)
- Engine: Volvo MD11C 24 hp (18 kW) diesel engine

Hull appendages
- Keel: fin keel
- Ballast: 6,120 lb (2,776 kg)
- Rudder: internally-mounted spade-type rudder

Rig
- Rig type: Bermuda rig
- I foretriangle height: 49.12 ft (14.97 m)
- J foretriangle base: 15.56 ft (4.74 m)
- P mainsail luff: 43.48 ft (13.25 m)
- E mainsail foot: 11.84 ft (3.61 m)

Sails
- Sailplan: Masthead sloop
- Mainsail area: 257.40 sq ft (23.913 m^{2})
- Jib/genoa area: 382.15 sq ft (35.503 m^{2})
- Total sail area: 639.56 sq ft (59.417 m^{2})

Racing
- PHRF: 113

The Baltic 37 is a Finnish sailboat that was designed by Robert W. Ball and C&C Design as an International Offshore Rule (IOR) racer-cruiser and first built in 1978.

The Baltic 37 is a development of the 1975 C&C 38-2, which is also a Ball design.

== Production ==
The design was built by Baltic Yachts in Finland, between 1978 and 1983. The company completed 51 examples of the design, but it is now out of production.

== Design ==
The company defined the design goals for the boat, "to produce a high performance, comfortable, easily handled yacht capable of offshore racing as well as offshore cruising at a size which could be best described as a 'small one-tonner'."

The Baltic 37 is a recreational keelboat, built predominantly of fibreglass with a balsa core, and wood trim. It has a masthead sloop rig with anodized aluminum spars, a raked stem, a raised counter reverse transom, a/an internally mounted spade-type rudder controlled by a wheel and a fixed fin keel. It displaces 13,600 lb (6,169 kg) and carries 6,120 lb (2,776 kg) of ballast.

The boat has a draft of 6.67 ft (2.03 m) with the standard keel fitted.

The boat is fitted with a Swedish Volvo MD11C diesel engine of 24 hp (18 kW) for docking and maneuvering. The fuel tank holds 22 U.S. gallons (83 L; 18 imp gal) and the fresh water tank has a capacity of 42 U.S. gallons (160 L; 35 imp gal).

Below decks there is sleeping accommodation for eight people. There is an aft cabin, with a double berth, settee berths and quarter berths in the main cabin and a bow "V"-berth. The galley is amidships on the starboard side and features a three-burner propane-fuel stove, a stainless steel icebox and a foot-pumped fresh water and seawater. The wood trim is all teak. The head is located aft, on the port side. A navigation station is located opposite the galley, on the port side.

Ventilation is provided by two tinted glass hatches and two opening portholes, one in the aft cabin and one in the head. The remaining cabin windows are all fixed.

The cockpit has a T-shaped design. The decks could be ordered with optional teak wood. The standing rigging is all stainless steel, except the midstay. Winches are provided for the mainsail halyard and sheet, reefing, Cunningham, spinnaker pole, topping lift genoa and spinnaker sheets.

The boats were factory-delivered and very completely equipped, including an anchor, fenders and turning blocks.

The design has a PHRF racing average handicap of 113 and an IOR rating of 27.5.

== Operational history ==
In a 1994 review Richard Sherwood wrote that the design, "… has a fin keel with high-aspect spade rudder. With a narrow beam at the water line she is initially tender but gains stiffness as she starts to heel. Aft sections are designed to increase sailing length when heeled. C&C wants to maintain speed off the wind without a strong weather helm."

== See also ==
- List of sailing boat types

Related development

- C&C 38-2

Similar sailboats

- Alberg 37
- C&C 37
- C&C 110
- CS 36
- Dickerson 37
- Dockrell 37
- Endeavour 37
- Express 37
- Hunter 36-2
- Marlow-Hunter 37
- Nor'Sea 37
- Tayana 37
