= Nor'Sea 37 =

Sailboat class

Development
- Designer: Lyle Hess
- Location: United States
- Year: 1992
- Builder: Nor'Sea Marine
- Role: Cruiser
- Name: Nor'Sea 37

Boat
- Displacement: 19,600 lb (8,890 kg)
- Draft: 5.58 ft (1.70 m)

Hull
- Type: monohull
- Construction: fiberglass
- LOA: 36.42 ft (11.10 m)
- LWL: 32.50 ft (9.91 m)
- Beam: 12.00 ft (3.66 m)
- Engine: Yanmar 4JH2-E 51 hp (38 kW) diesel engine

Hull appendages
- Keel: modified long keel
- Ballast: 7,200 lb (3,266 kg)
- Rudders: keel and transom-mounted rudder

Rig
- Rig type: Cutter rig

Sails
- Sailplan: Cutter rigged sloop
- Total sail area: 720.00 sq ft (66.890 m^{2})

The Nor'Sea 37 is an American sailboat that was designed by Lyle Hess as a global blue water cruiser for living aboard and first built in 1992.

== Production ==
The design was built by Nor'Sea Marine in Dana Point, California, United States, starting in 1992 but it is now out of production.

== Design ==
The Nor'Sea 37 is a recreational keelboat, built predominantly of fiberglass, with wood trim. It has a cutter rig, a raked stem, a rounded transom, a keel and transom-hung rudder controlled by a tiller and a fixed modified long keel with a cutaway forefoot. It displaces 19,600 lb (8,890 kg) and carries 7,200 lb (3,266 kg) of lead ballast.

The boat has a draft of 5.58 ft (1.70 m) with the standard keel.

The boat is fitted with a Japanese 4JH2-E diesel engine of 51 hp (38 kW) for docking and maneuvering. The fuel tank holds 100 U.S. gallons (380 L; 83 imp gal) and the fresh water tank has a capacity of 170 U.S. gallons (640 L; 140 imp gal).

The design has sleeping accommodation for seven people, with a double berth in the bow cabin, a drop-down dinette table in the main cabin, a pilot berth amidships on the port side and an aft cabin with a double berth on the starboard side. The galley is located on the starboard side just forward of the companionway ladder. The galley is U-shaped and is equipped with a three-burner stove, an ice box and a sink. The head is located just aft of the galley on the starboard side.

The boat has a hull speed of 7.64 kn (14 km/h).

== See also ==
- List of sailing boat types

Related development

- Nor'Sea 27

Similar sailboats

- Alberg 37
- Baltic 37
- C&C 37
- C&C 110
- CS 36
- Dickerson 37
- Dockrell 37
- Endeavour 37
- Express 37
- Hunter 36-2
- Marlow-Hunter 37
- Tayana 37
