= Beneteau 361 =

Sailboat class

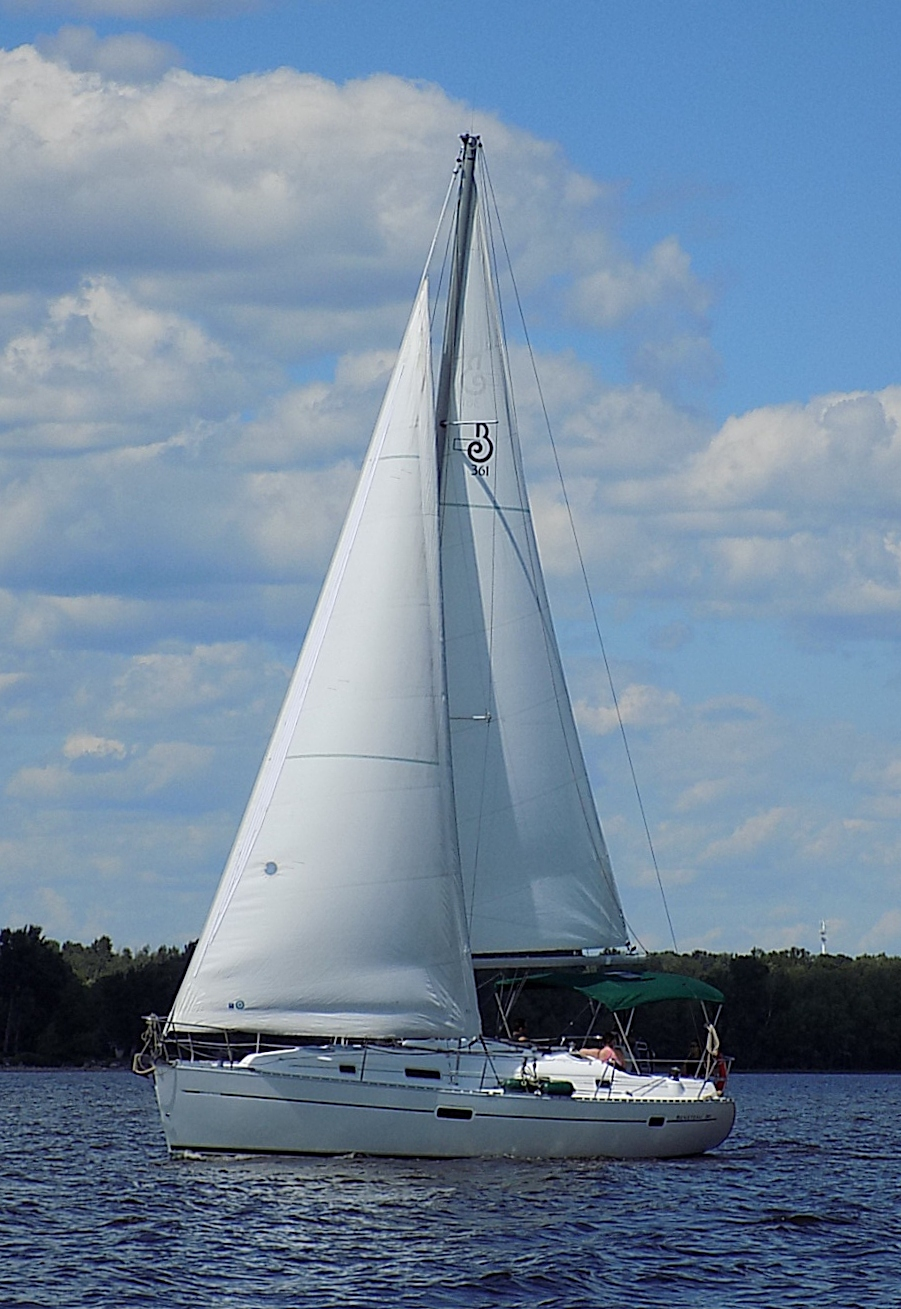

Development
- Designer: Berret-Racoupeau Yacht Design
- Location: United States
- Year: 1999
- Builder: Beneteau
- Name: Beneteau 361

Boat
- Displacement: 13,349 lb (6,055 kg)
- Draft: 5.00 ft (1.52 m)

Hull
- Type: Monohull
- Construction: Fiberglass
- LOA: 36.42 ft (11.10 m)
- LWL: 31.08 ft (9.47 m)
- Beam: 12.50 ft (3.81 m)
- Engine: Volvo Penta 2030 30 hp (22 kW) diesel engine

Hull appendages
- Keel: fin keel
- Ballast: 4,156 lb (1,885 kg)
- Rudder: internally-mounted spade-type rudder

Rig
- Rig type: Bermuda rig
- I foretriangle height: 45.21 ft (13.78 m)
- J foretriangle base: 13.94 ft (4.25 m)
- P mainsail luff: 38.39 ft (11.70 m)
- E mainsail foot: 14.44 ft (4.40 m)

Sails
- Sailplan: Masthead sloop
- Mainsail area: 277.18 sq ft (25.751 m^{2})
- Jib/genoa area: 315.11 sq ft (29.275 m^{2})
- Total sail area: 592.29 sq ft (55.026 m^{2})

The Beneteau 361 is an American sailboat, that was designed by Berret-Racoupeau Yacht Design of La Rochelle, France and first built in 1999.

== Production ==
The design was built by Beneteau in the United States, but it is now out of production. It was also called the Oceanis 361 and was marketed as the Moorings 362 with a two cabin configuration and as the Moorings 363 and Stardust 363 with three cabins, for use primarily in the yacht charter business.

== Design ==
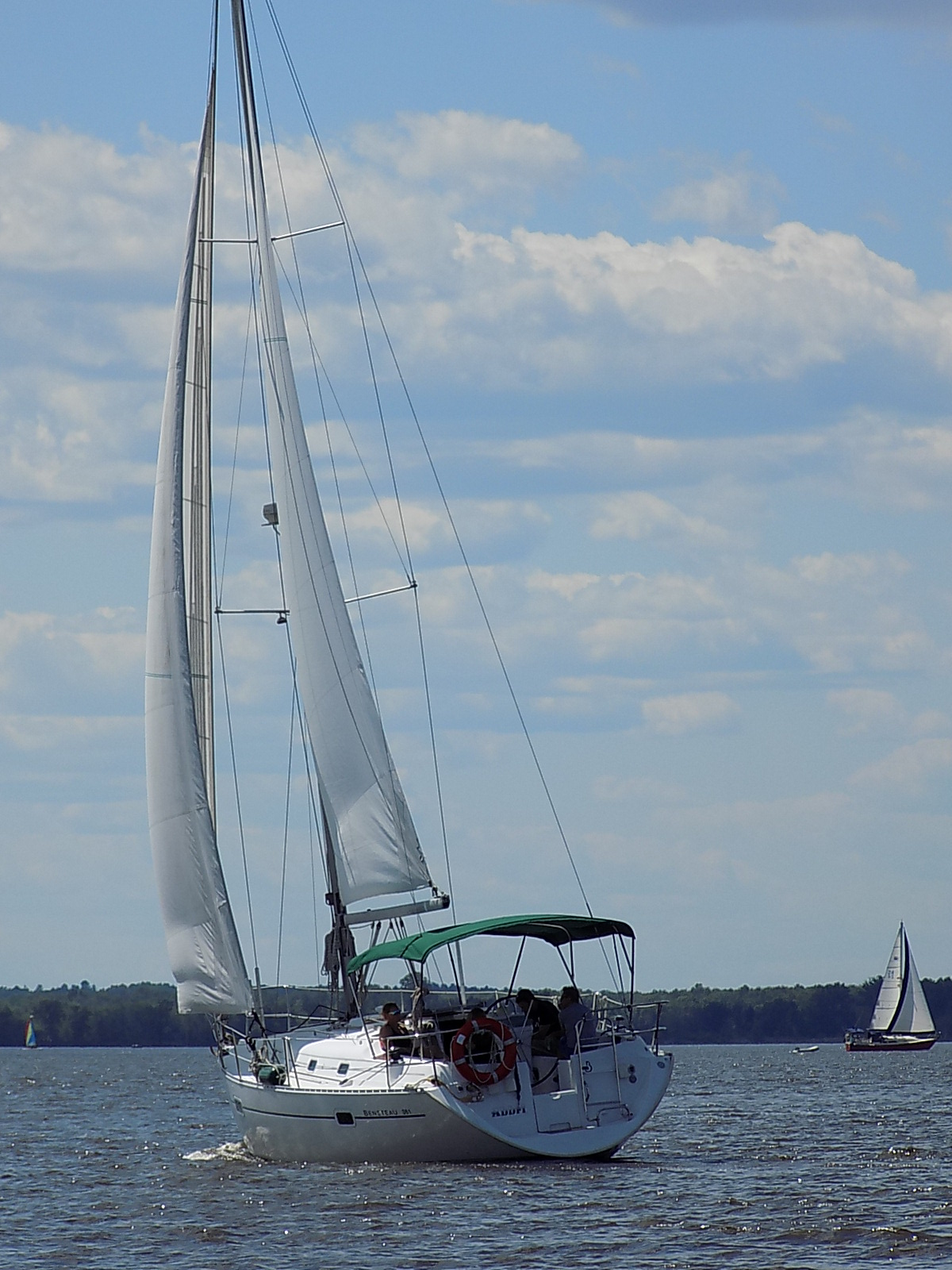
Beneteau 361 showing its walk-through reverse transom.

The Beneteau 361 is a recreational keelboat, built predominantly of fiberglass. It has a masthead sloop rig, a raked stem, a walk-through reverse transom an internally-mounted spade-type rudder controlled by a wheel and a fixed fin bulb keel. It displaces 13,349 lb (6,055 kg) and carries 4,156 lb (1,885 kg) of ballast.

The boat has a draft of 5.00 ft (1.52 m) with the standard keel fitted. It was sold in three cabin configurations, two cabin, three cabin and with a main saloon.

The design has sleeping accommodation for four to six people in two or three cabins. There is a double "V"-berth berth in the bow cabin, an U-shaped settee and a straight settee in the main salon and an aft cabin with a transverse double berth or opetionally, two cabins aft, each with doubles. The galley is located on the port side just forward of the companionway ladder. The galley is C-shaped and is equipped with a three-burner stove, an icebox and a double sink. A navigation station is forward of the galley, on the port side. The head is located amidships on the starboard side.

The boat is fitted with a Swedish Volvo Penta 2030 diesel engine of 30 hp (22 kW). The fuel tank holds 20 U.S. gallons (76 L; 17 imp gal) and the fresh water tank has a capacity of 125 U.S. gallons (470 L; 104 imp gal).

The design has a hull speed of 7.47 kn (13.83 km/h).

== See also ==
- List of sailing boat types

Similar sailboats

- C&C 36-1
- C&C 36R
- C&C 110
- Catalina 36
- Columbia 36
- Coronado 35
- CS 36
- Ericson 36
- Frigate 36
- Hunter 36
- Hunter 36 Legend
- Hunter 36 Vision
- Hunter 36-2
- Islander 36
- Nonsuch 36
- Portman 36
- Watkins 36
- Watkins 36C
