= Endeavour 37 =

Sailboat class

Development
- Designer: Dennis Robbins
- Location: United States
- Year: 1977
- No. built: 476
- Builder: Endeavour Yacht Corp
- Role: Racer-Cruiser
- Name: Endeavour 37

Boat
- Displacement: 20,000 lb (9,072 kg)
- Draft: 4.50 ft (1.37 m)

Hull
- Type: Monohull
- Construction: Fiberglass
- LOA: 37.00 ft (11.28 m)
- LWL: 30.00 ft (9.14 m)
- Beam: 11.58 ft (3.53 m)
- Engine: Perkins Engines 4-108 50 hp (37 kW) diesel engine

Hull appendages
- Keel: long keel
- Ballast: 8,000 lb (3,629 kg)
- Rudder: keel-mounted rudder

Rig
- Rig type: Bermuda rig
- I foretriangle height: 43.00 ft (13.11 m)
- J foretriangle base: 15.00 ft (4.57 m)
- P mainsail luff: 36.00 ft (10.97 m)
- E mainsail foot: 14.00 ft (4.27 m)

Sails
- Sailplan: Masthead sloop
- Mainsail area: 252.00 sq ft (23.412 m^{2})
- Jib/genoa area: 322.50 sq ft (29.961 m^{2})
- Total sail area: 574.50 sq ft (53.373 m^{2})

Racing
- D-PN: 88.0 (cutter rig)
- PHRF: 186 (cutter rig)

The Endeavour 37 is an American sailboat that was designed by Dennis Robbins as racer-cruiser and first built in 1977.

The Endeavour 37 is a development of the Creekmore 34.

== Production ==
The design was built by the Endeavour Yacht Corp in Largo, Florida, United States. The company completed 476 examples of the design between 1977 and 1983, but it is now out of production.

== Design ==
There are a number of accounts that indicate that the Endeavour 37 design originated from a Creekmore 34 boat that had been cut in half amidships and extended by 3 ft (0.9 m) in length. The Endeavour 37 mold was then made using that modified Creekmore as a plug.

The Endeavour 37 is a recreational keelboat, built predominantly of fiberglass solid laminate, with teak wood trim. It has a masthead sloop rig, or an optional cutter rig, ketch or yawl rig, each with aluminum spars. Boats were also available with a tall rig, about 3 ft (0.9 m) higher, for sailing in areas with lighter winds. A bowsprit was also optional.

The design features a raked stem, a slightly raised counter transom, a keel-mounted rudder controlled by a wheel and a fixed modified long keel, with a cut-away forefoot. It displaces 20,000 lb (9,072 kg) and carries 8,000 lb (3,629 kg) of ballast.

The boat has a draft of 4.50 ft (1.37 m) with the standard keel fitted.

The boat is fitted with a British Perkins Engines 4-108 diesel engine of 50 hp (37 kW) for docking and maneuvering. The fuel tank holds 55 U.S. gallons (210 L; 46 imp gal) and the fresh water tank has a capacity of 101 U.S. gallons (380 L; 84 imp gal).

The design has sleeping accommodation for six people. Unconventionally, there is private double stateroom aft on the port side, a double quarter berth on the starboard side, plus a forward dinette table that folds, with two settee berths. In this arrangement the galley is located amidships on the starboard side and is a U-shaped design, with a three-burner, alcohol-fired stove, an oven and a 10 cu ft (0.28 m^{3}) ice box. Pressurized water is also supplied, as well as foot-pumped water. The head is located amidships, on the port side, opposite the galley and features a shower.

The interior wood is all teak, with a teak parquet cabin sole. In the cockpit, the coamings and the rail caps are all teak, as are the coach house roof-mounted handrails.

Ventilation is provided by three deck hatches and ten opening ports.

For sailing the mainsheet is attached to the bridge deck. There is a mast-mounted winch provided for the mainsail halyard and the genoa. The genoa is sheeted with rail-mounted tracks to two cockpit coaming-mounted winches.

The design has a PHRF racing average handicap of 186 and a Portsmouth Yardstick handicap of 88.0.

== Operational history ==
In the 1994 Field Guide to Sailboats of North America, Second Edition, Richard Sherwood wrote, "with a private stateroom aft and with a total of six bunks, the Endeavour qualifies as a live-aboard boat with a lot of storage space, With two or four aboard there is no need to use the settees for berths. The keel is long and the displacement hull is heavy. The draft is shallow. When the boat is rigged as a ketch, the mizzen goes through the cockpit just forward of the binnacle. A more conventional cabin arrangement is available."

== See also ==
- List of sailing boat types

Similar sailboats

- Alberg 37
- Baltic 37
- C&C 37
- CS 36
- Dickerson 37
- Dockrell 37
- Express 37
- Nor'Sea 37
- Tayana 37
