= C&C 37 =

Sailboat class

Development
- Designer: Robert W. Ball
- Location: Canada
- Year: 1981
- Builder: C&C Yachts
- Name: C&C 37

Boat
- Displacement: 14,300 lb (6,486 kg)
- Draft: 6.70 ft (2.04 m)

Hull
- Type: Monohull
- Construction: Fiberglass
- LOA: 37.58 ft (11.45 m)
- LWL: 28.75 ft (8.76 m)
- Beam: 11.67 ft (3.56 m)
- Engine: Yanmar 3HM 27 hp (20 kW) diesel engine

Hull appendages
- Keel: fin keel
- Ballast: 6,000 lb (2,722 kg)
- Rudder: internally-mounted spade-type rudder

Rig
- Rig type: Bermuda rig
- I foretriangle height: 51.00 ft (15.54 m)
- J foretriangle base: 15.50 ft (4.72 m)
- P mainsail luff: 45.16 ft (13.76 m)
- E mainsail foot: 12.16 ft (3.71 m)

Sails
- Sailplan: Masthead sloop
- Mainsail area: 274.57 sq ft (25.508 m^{2})
- Jib/genoa area: 395.25 sq ft (36.720 m^{2})
- Total sail area: 669.82 sq ft (62.228 m^{2})

Racing
- PHRF: 69 (average)

The C&C 37 is a Canadian sailboat, that was designed by Robert W. Ball of C&C Design and first built in 1981.

== Production ==
The boat was built by C&C Yachts in Canada between 1981 and 1986, but it is now out of production.

== Design ==
The C&C 37 is a small recreational keelboat, built predominantly of fiberglass, with wood trim. It has a masthead sloop rig, an internally-mounted spade-type rudder. It displaces 14,300 lb (6,486 kg) and carries 6,000 lb (2,722 kg) of lead ballast.

The boat has a draft of 6.70 ft (2.04 m) with the standard fin keel and 6.00 ft (1.83 m) with the optional shoal draft keel. A centreboard version was also built. It has a draft of 8.40 ft (2.56 m) with the centreboard extended and 4.60 ft (1.40 m) with it retracted.

The boat is fitted with a Japanese Yanmar 3HM diesel engine of 27 hp (20 kW). The fuel tank holds 20 U.S. gallons (76 L; 17 imp gal) and the fresh water tank has a capacity of 60 U.S. gallons (230 L; 50 imp gal).

The standard keel version has a PHRF racing average handicap of 69. The shoal draft keel version has a PHRF racing average handicap of 108 with a high of 108 and low of 111. The centreboard version has a PHRF racing average handicap of 114 with a high of 114 and low of 120. All models have hull speeds of 7.18 kn (13.30 km/h).

== See also ==
- List of sailing boat types

Similar sailboats

- Alberg 37
- Baltic 37
- C&C 110
- CS 36
- Dickerson 37
- Dockrell 37
- Endeavour 37
- Express 37
- Hunter 36-2
- Marlow-Hunter 37
- Nor'Sea 37
- Tayana 37
