= Beneteau First Class 10 =

Sailboat class

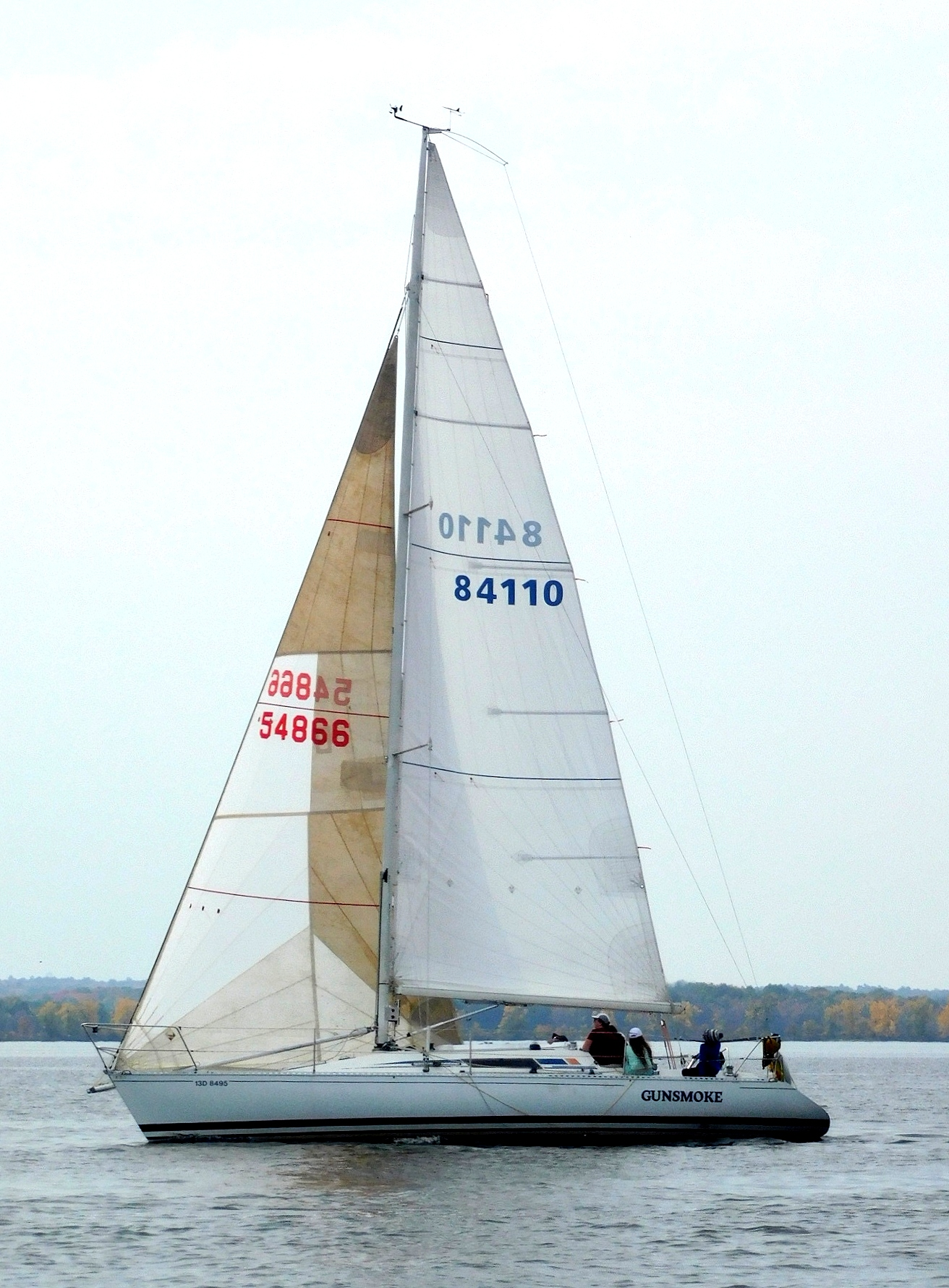

Development
- Designer: Groupe Finot/Jacques Fauroux
- Location: France
- Year: 1982
- No. built: 114
- Builder: Beneteau
- Role: Racer-Cruiser
- Name: Beneteau First Class 10

Boat
- Displacement: 6,900 lb (3,130 kg)
- Draft: 5.75 ft (1.75 m)

Hull
- Type: Monohull
- Construction: Fiberglass
- LOA: 34.33 ft (10.46 m)
- LWL: 30.08 ft (9.17 m)
- Beam: 9.67 ft (2.95 m)
- Engine: Yanmar 2GM diesel engine

Hull appendages
- Keel: fin keel
- Ballast: 2,450 lb (1,111 kg)
- Rudder: internally-mounted spade-type rudder

Rig
- Rig type: Bermuda rig
- I foretriangle height: 37.45 ft (11.41 m)
- J foretriangle base: 12.89 ft (3.93 m)
- P mainsail luff: 40.02 ft (12.20 m)
- E mainsail foot: 13.84 ft (4.22 m)

Sails
- Sailplan: Fractional rigged sloop
- Mainsail area: 276.94 sq ft (25.729 m^{2})
- Jib/genoa area: 241.37 sq ft (22.424 m^{2})
- Total sail area: 518.30 sq ft (48.152 m^{2})

The Beneteau First Class 10 is a French sailboat that was designed by Jean Marie Finot of Groupe Finot and Jacques Fauroux as a racer/cruiser and first built in 1982.

== Production ==
The design was built by Beneteau in France between 1982 and 1987, with a total of 114 boats completed, but it is now out of production.

== Design ==
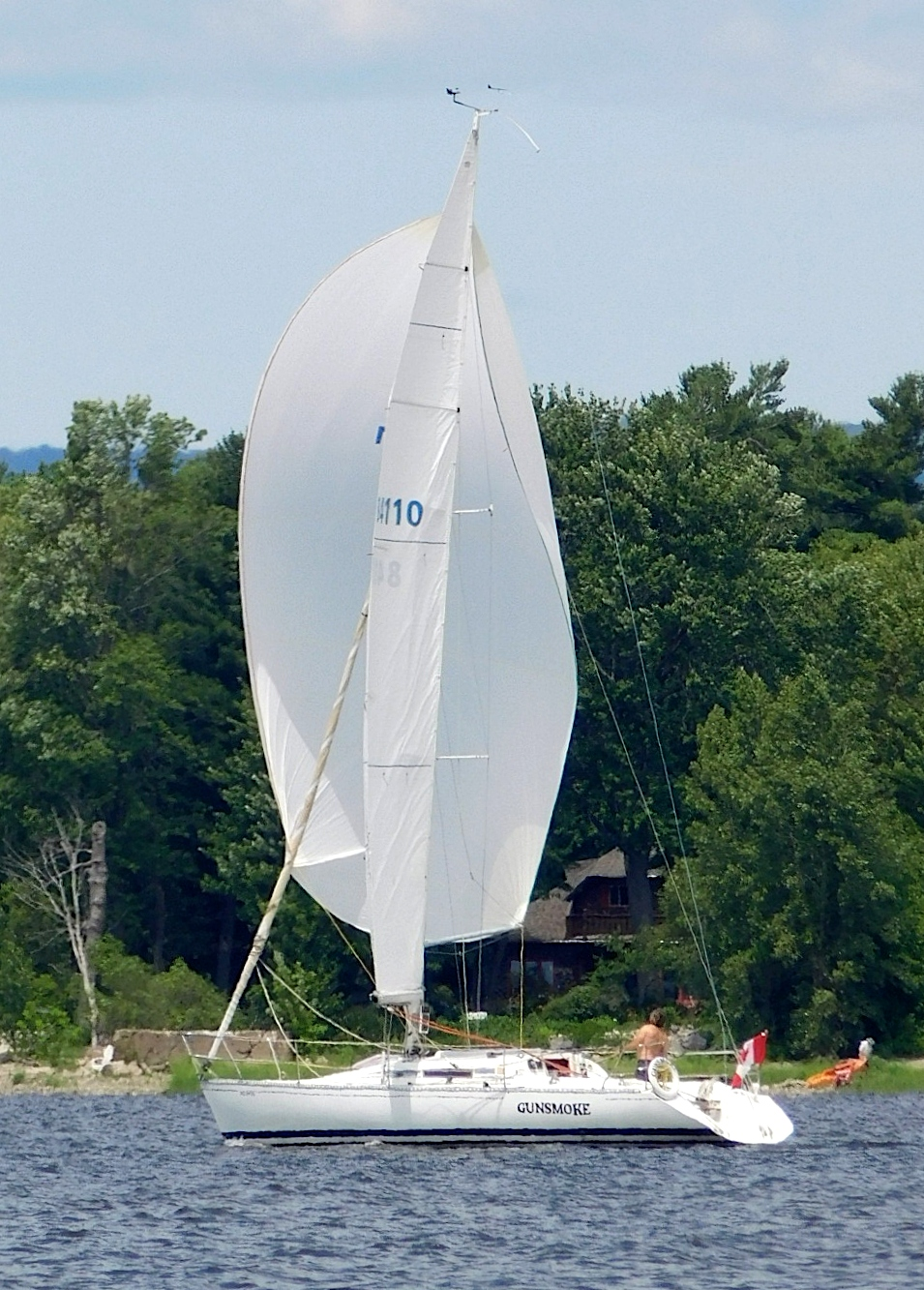
Beneteau First Class 10 flying its spinnaker

The Beneteau First Class 10 is a recreational keelboat, built predominantly of solid fiberglass, with the deck made from balsa-cored fiberglass, with teak wooden trim. It has a 7/8 fractional sloop rig, with a double-spreader mast made by Z-Spar of France and stainless steel wire rigging. The hull has a raked stem, a walk-through reverse transom, an internally mounted spade-type rudder controlled by a tiller and a fixed fin keel. It displaces 6,900 lb (3,130 kg) and carries 2,450 lb (1,111 kg) of ballast.

The boat has a draft of 5.75 ft (1.75 m) with the standard keel and is fitted with a Japanese Yanmar 2GM diesel engine for docking and maneuvering. The engine is mounted amidships, just above the keel and drives a folding propeller that is just aft of the keel.

The design has sleeping accommodation for six people, with a double "V"-berth in the bow cabin, an L-shaped settee and a straight settee in the main cabin and an aft cabin with a double berth on the starboard side. The galley is located on the port side just forward of the companionway ladder. The galley is L-shaped and is equipped with a two-burner, alcohol-fired stove and a single sink. A navigation station is opposite the galley, on the starboard side. The head is located just aft of the bow berth, within that cabin and has no sink. The main cabin has a double drop-leaf table. The cabin has a teak veneer headliner and teak bulkheads with a cabin sole of teak and holly. The interior walls are covered in cream-colored, foam-backed vinyl or a material made from pile fabric.

For sailing the boat is equipped with a double groove headstay, adjustable jib fairleads and adjustable running backstays that lead to self-tailing winches, The mainsail has a mid-cockpit mainsheet traveler, with a secondary block for fine-tuning.

== Operational history ==
A review in the July 1982 issue of Canadian Yachting by Carol Nickle and Bryan Gooderham concluded, "the Beneteau First Class 10 will provide plenty of sailing excitement for those who enjoy the exhilaration of flat out performance. It exhibits a distinct French flair in both design and décor that provides a contrast to the mainstream of North American yachts." They did find much to criticize in the construction and materials used, however. On the choice of cabin interior materials, for instance, they stated, "we are a little dubious of the durability of this covering and its appearance after several years of hard racing." On the rigging, they stated, "rod rigging rather than stainless steel wire would be a useful addition on such a high-performance boat" and "we thought the cast-aluminum [boom] gooseneck fitting was of less than premier quality".

== See also ==
- List of sailing boat types

Similar sailboats

- Beneteau 331
- C&C 34
- C&C 34/36
- Catalina 34
- Coast 34
- Columbia 34
- Columbia 34 Mark II
- Creekmore 34
- Crown 34
- CS 34
- Express 34
- Hunter 34
- San Juan 34
- Sea Sprite 34
- Sun Odyssey 349
- Tartan 34 C
- Tartan 34-2
- Viking 34
