= Endeavour Yacht Corporation =

American sailboat manufacturer

- Company type: Privately held company
- Industry: Boat building
- Founded: 1974
- Founder: John Brooks and Rob Valdes
- Defunct: 1986
- Headquarters: Largo, Florida, United States
- Products: Sailboats

The Endeavour Yacht Corporation was an American boat builder based in Largo, Florida. Founded in 1974 by John Brooks and Rob Valdes, the company specialized in the design and manufacture of fiberglass sailboats. The company went out of business in 1986. It was bought by Bob Vincent and built sailing Cats and Power Cats from 36' to 48' until his death in 2019. There are very active owners' groups for the boats.

== History ==
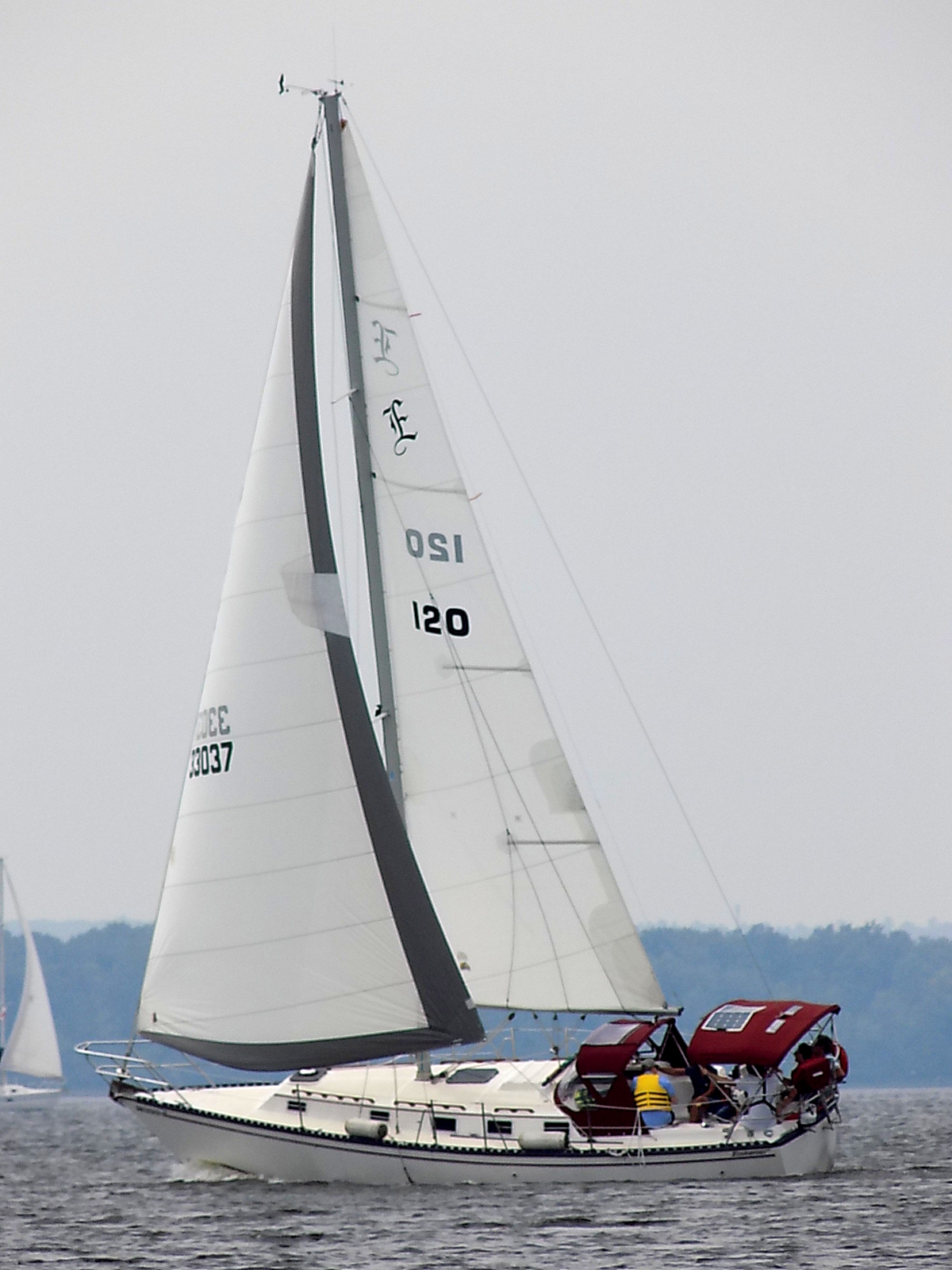
Endeavour 33

Brooks and Valdes had met while working for Vince Lazzara at Gulfstar Yachts. To assist the fledgling company get started in the boat building business, Ted Irwin of Irwin Yachts gave them the molds for the 1970 Irwin 32 in exchange for a small number of shares. The molds were modified by Dennis Robbins, who was responsible for Endeavour's production and design work. The reworked design was called the Endeavour 32 and about 600 examples were produced, starting in 1975, giving the company an early market success.

For a second design Brooks and Valdes located an abandoned Ray Creekmore designed 34 ft (10 m) boat on the Miami River. It was also modified by Robbins, by adding 3 ft (0.91 m) to the middle of the boat and it became the basis for the 1977 Endeavour 37, which was produced in sloop, cutter and yawl configurations. The company sold 476 examples of that design. The larger Endeavour 43 followed in 1979. These three designs were all optimized for sailing in the waters of the Florida Keys and the Bahama Islands and emphasized shoal drafts over good windward performance. Construction was all of fiberglass woven roving and multi-directional chopped strand fiber (MCSF), with polyester resin and plywood for cores. Robbins left the company to work for Irwin Yachts and Bob Johnson became the main designer for the next few years.

Starting in 1980 the emphasis shifted to improving sailing performance along with new construction materials and techniques. The 1981 Endeavour 40 was designed for the owner cruising market but also with an eye to establishing sales in the yacht charter market. This drove designs that were faster and also more comfortable.

America's Cup designer Johan Valentijn designed the Endeavour 38 in 1984 and Bruce Kelly drew the Endeavour 33 and 35 designs that same year. Construction moved to Klegecell, a closed-cell type of polyvinyl foam core, with multi-axial steel reinforced grids to improve hull stiffness. Valentijn went on to design the Endeavour 42 and 51 and by 1985 the company was producing center-cockpit boats for cruising and charter use. Construction was changed using end-grain balsa wood in the hulls above the waterline areas and plywood for more stressed parts of the boats, with polyurethane foam and triaxial fiberglass.

By 1984 the company had 300 employees and was building 200 boats per year. Due to the effects of the early 1980s recession Brooks closed the company and it entered bankruptcy. It was sold to the Denver-based Coastal Financial Corporation, headed by Troy Rollins. Brooks became the sales manager and Doug Franzese, who had been Production Manager at Gulfstar, became the company General Manager. Coastal Financial reopened production, but by 1988 were operating with only 105 employees and producing 50 boats per year, due to declining sales and competition with the used boat market.

The company was again closed in 1988 and sold to a Charleston, South Carolina investment company who re-opened it, but went out of business that same year. The company was sold again by Coastal Financial in 1991. After passing through several owners it became the Endeavour Catamaran Corporation. As of 2020, that company produces catamaran motorboats at a new plant location in Clearwater, Florida. At one time they produced sailing catamarans and even produced some of the former Endeavour monohull designs on a custom basis, including the Endeavour 42, Endeavour 45 and Endeavour 52 as late as 1992, but this business seems to have been ended before 2000.

Original founder John Brooks was killed at his home in St Petersburg, Florida on 24 April 1996 in an apparent robbery attempt. He was 61 years old.

== Boats ==
Summary of boats built by Endeavour:

- Lancer 25 - 1975
- Endeavour 32 - 1976
- Endeavour 32 CB - 1976
- Endeavour 37 - 1977
- Endeavour 43 - 1979
- Endeavour 40 - 1981
- Endeavour 33 - 1983
- Endeavour 35 - 1983
- Endeavour 38 - 1984
- Endeavour 38 CC - 1984
- CSY 51 - 1985
- Endeavour 42 - 1985
- Endeavour 51 - 1985
- Endeavour 52 - 1989
- Endeavour 54 - 1990
- Intercat 1500 - 1990
- Endeavourcat 30 - 1992
- Manta 40 - 1994
- Endeavour TrawlerCats 36 1998
- Endeavour TrawlerCats 38 - 2000
- Endeavour TrawlerCat 40 - 2005
- Endeavour TrawlerCat 44 - 2004
- Endeavour TrawlerCat 48 - 2007

== See also ==
- List of sailboat designers and manufacturers
