= Hunter 36-2 =

Sailboat class

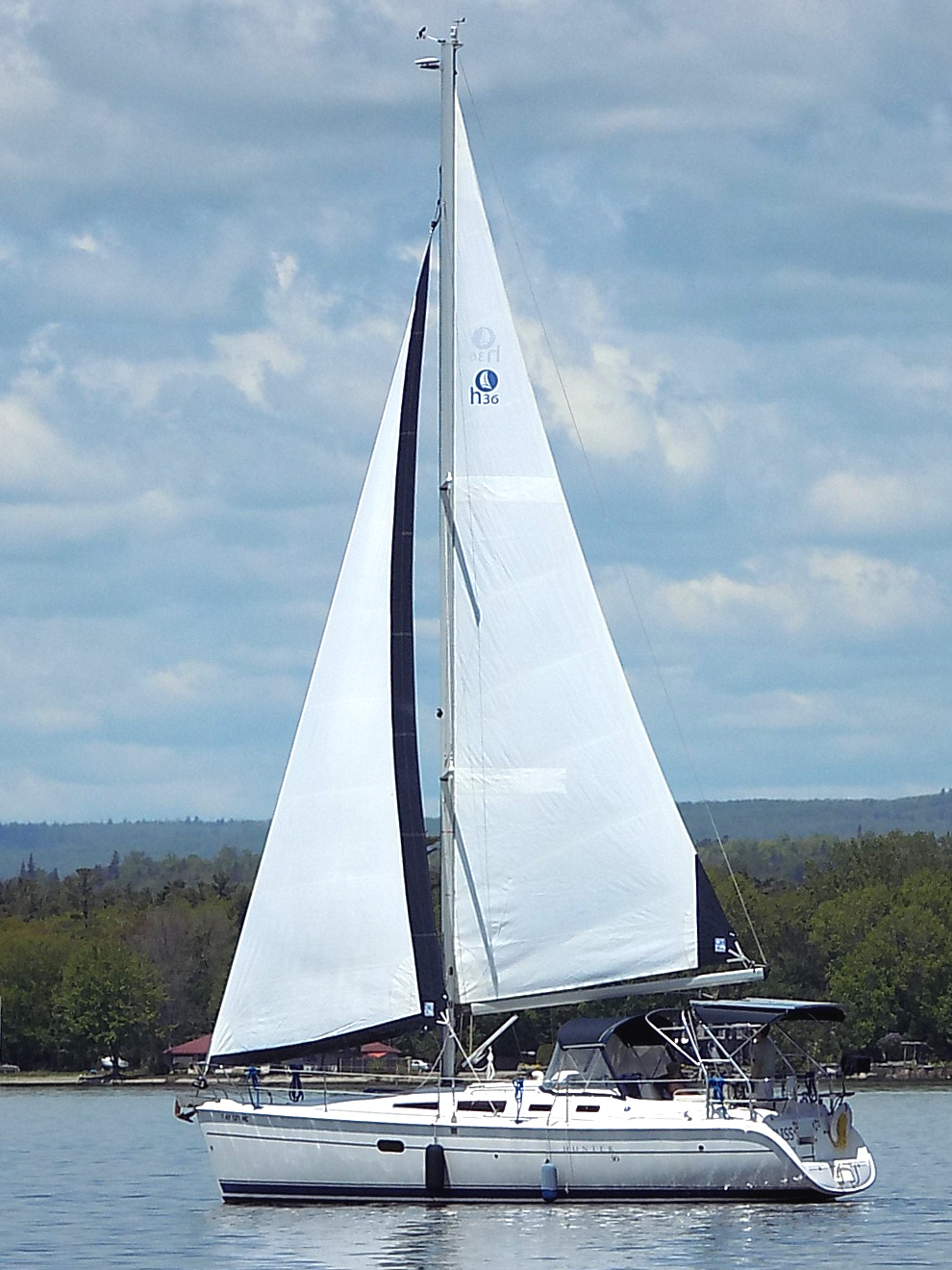

Development
- Designer: Glenn Henderson
- Location: United States
- Year: 2008
- Builder: Hunter Marine
- Name: Hunter 36-2

Boat
- Displacement: 13,900 lb (6,305 kg)
- Draft: 6.42 ft (1.96 m)

Hull
- Type: Monohull
- Construction: Fiberglass
- LOA: 35.50 ft (10.82 m)
- LWL: 31.25 ft (9.53 m)
- Beam: 12.00 ft (3.66 m)
- Engine: Yanmar 29 hp (22 kW) diesel engine

Hull appendages
- Keel: fin keel
- Ballast: 5,023 lb (2,278 kg)
- Rudder: internally-mounted spade-type rudder

Rig
- General: B&R rig sloop
- I foretriangle height: 44.83 ft (13.66 m)
- J foretriangle base: 13.16 ft (4.01 m)
- P mainsail luff: 44.92 ft (13.69 m)
- E mainsail foot: 15.00 ft (4.57 m)

Sails
- Mainsail area: 336.90 sq ft (31.299 m^{2})
- Jib/genoa area: 294.98 sq ft (27.405 m^{2})
- Total sail area: 631.88 sq ft (58.704 m^{2})

The Hunter 36-2 is an American sailboat, that was designed by Glenn Henderson and first built in 2008.

The Hunter 36-2 is a development of the slightly smaller 2000 model Hunter 356.

The design was sold as the Hunter 36 but is now usually referred to as the 36-2 to differentiate it from the unrelated 1980 Hunter 36. It can also be confused with the 1990 Hunter 36 Vision and the 2001 Hunter 36 Legend, all sailboats with similar names by the same builder.

== Production ==
The boat was built by Hunter Marine in the United States, but it is now out of production.

== Design ==
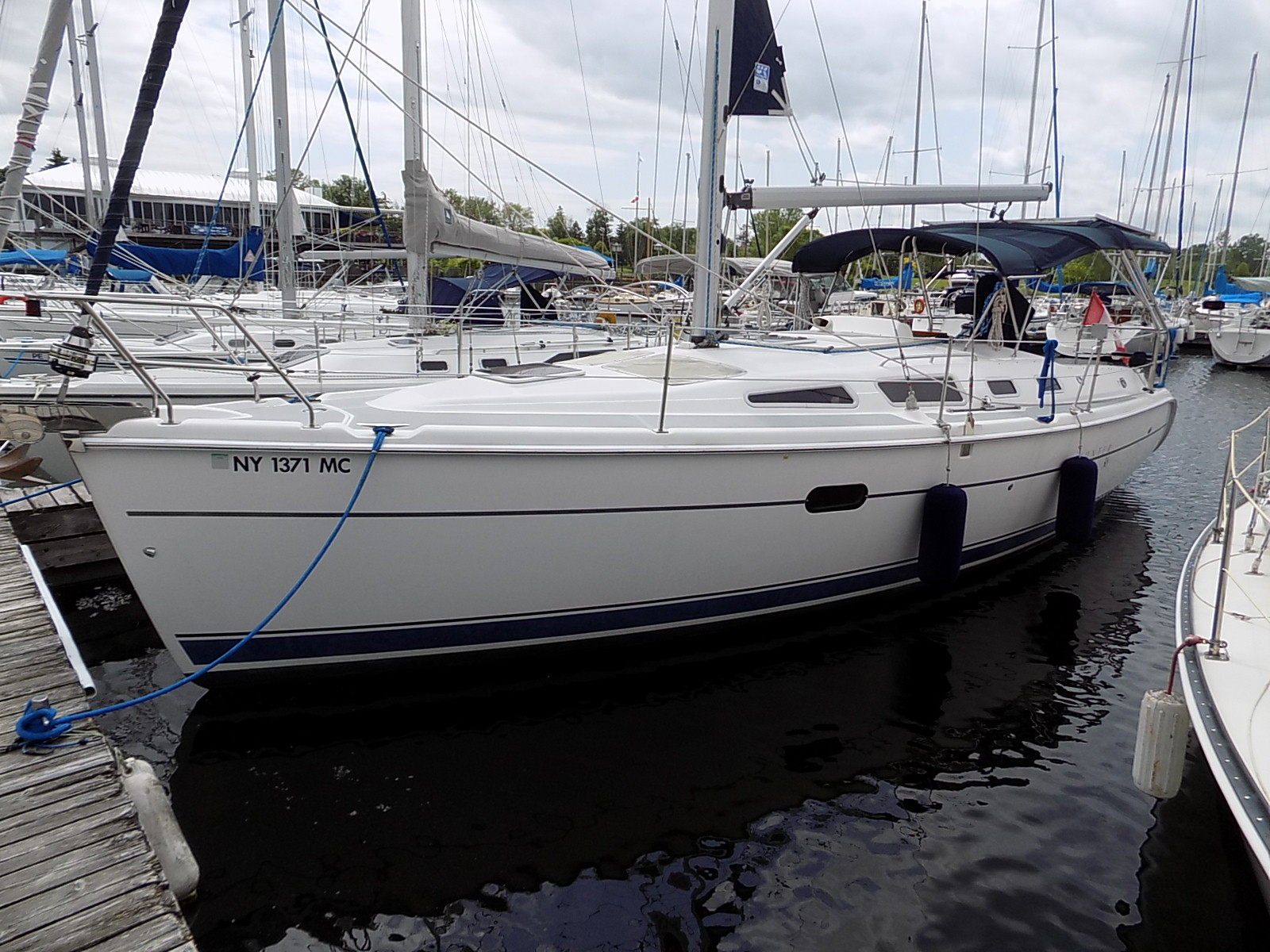
Hunter 36-2

The Hunter 36-2 is a small recreational keelboat, built predominantly of fiberglass. It has a B&R rig, an internally-mounted spade-type rudder, a reverse transom, mast-furling mainsail and a fixed fin keel. It displaces 13,900 lb (6,305 kg) and carries 5,023 lb (2,278 kg) of ballast.

The boat has a draft of 6.42 ft (1.96 m) with the standard keel and 4.92 ft (1.50 m) with the optional shoal draft keel.

The boat is fitted with a Japanese Yanmar diesel engine of 29 hp (22 kW). The fuel tank holds 38 U.S. gallons (140 L; 32 imp gal) and the fresh water tank has a capacity of 75 U.S. gallons (280 L; 62 imp gal).

The design has a hull speed of 7.49 kn (13.87 km/h).

== See also ==
- List of sailing boat types

Related development

- Hunter 356

Similar sailboats

- Alberg 37
- Baltic 37
- Beneteau 361
- C&C 36-1
- C&C 36R
- C&C 37
- C&C 110
- Catalina 36
- Columbia 36
- Coronado 35
- Dickerson 37
- Dockrell 37
- Ericson 36
- Express 37
- Frigate 36
- Hunter 36
- Hunter 36 Legend
- Hunter 36 Vision
- Invader 36
- Islander 36
- Marlow-Hunter 37
- Nonsuch 36
- Nor'Sea 37
- Portman 36
- S2 11.0
- Seidelmann 37
- Watkins 36
- Watkins 36C
