= Express 34 =

Sailboat class

Development
- Designer: Carl Schumacher
- Location: United States
- Year: 1986
- Builder: Alsberg Brothers Boatworks
- Name: Express 34

Boat
- Displacement: 8,500 lb (3,856 kg)
- Draft: 6.00 ft (1.83 m)

Hull
- Type: Monohull
- Construction: Fiberglass
- LOA: 34.00 ft (10.36 m)
- LWL: 28.33 ft (8.63 m)
- Beam: 10.50 ft (3.20 m)
- Engine: Yanmar 2GMF diesel engine 18 hp (13 kW)

Hull appendages
- Keel: fin keel
- Ballast: 3,700 lb (1,678 kg)
- Rudder: internally-mounted spade-type rudder

Rig
- Rig type: Bermuda rig
- I foretriangle height: 44.30 ft (13.50 m)
- J foretriangle base: 13.00 ft (3.96 m)
- P mainsail luff: 38.50 ft (11.73 m)
- E mainsail foot: 12.80 ft (3.90 m)

Sails
- Sailplan: Masthead sloop
- Mainsail area: 246.40 sq ft (22.891 m^{2})
- Jib/genoa area: 287.95 sq ft (26.751 m^{2})
- Total sail area: 534.35 sq ft (49.643 m^{2})

The Express 34 is an American light displacement sailboat, designed by Carl Schumacher as a racer-cruiser and first built in 1986.

== Production ==
The design was built by Alsberg Brothers Boatworks in Santa Cruz, California from 1986 to 1988, but is now out of production. It was the last of the production boats built before the company went out of business in 1988. The company built 28 of the boats.

== Design ==
The Express 34 is a recreational keelboat, built predominantly of fiberglass, with wood trim. It has a masthead sloop rig, a raked stem, a reverse transom, an internally mounted elliptical spade-type rudder controlled by a tiller and an elliptical fixed fin keel. It displaces 8,500 lb (3,856 kg) and carries 3,700 lb (1,678 kg) of lead ballast.

The boat has a draft of 6.00 ft (1.83 m) with the standard keel fitted. The boat is fitted with a Japanese Yanmar 2GMF diesel engine of 18 hp (13 kW). The fuel tank holds 22 U.S. gallons (83 L; 18 imp gal) and the fresh water tank has a capacity of 55 U.S. gallons (210 L; 46 imp gal).

== Operational history ==
The Express 34 won Sailing World's Overall Boat of the Year award in 1987.

== See also ==
- List of sailing boat types

Related development

- Express 37
- Express 27

Similar sailboats

- Beneteau 331
- Beneteau First Class 10
- C&C 34
- C&C 34/36
- Catalina 34
- Coast 34
- Columbia 34
- Columbia 34 Mark II
- Creekmore 34
- Crown 34
- CS 34
- Hunter 34
- San Juan 34
- S&S 34
- Sea Sprite 34
- Sun Odyssey 349
- Tartan 34-2
- UFO 34 (yacht)
- Viking 34
