= C&C 34 =

Sailboat class

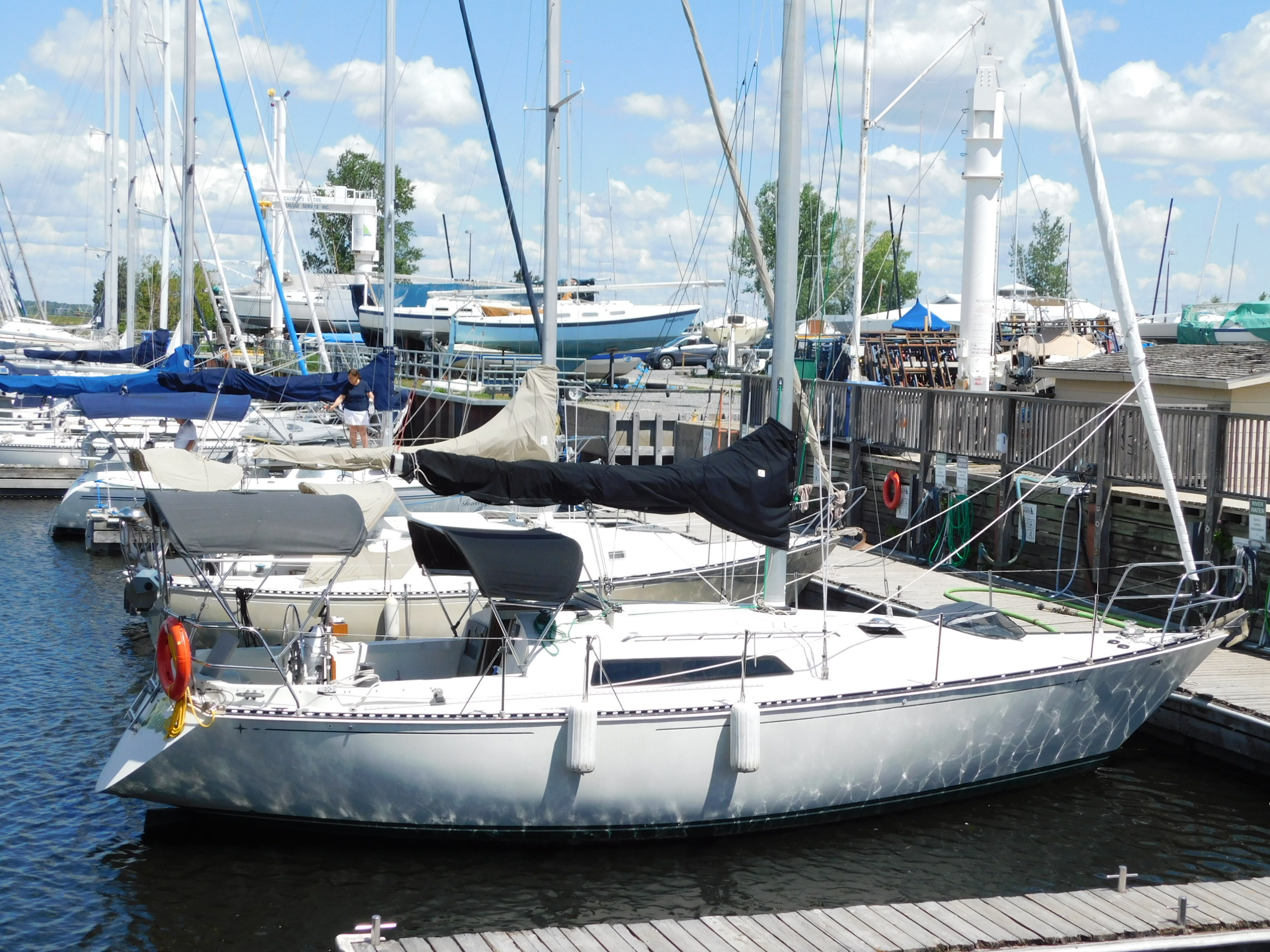

Development
- Designer: Robert W. Ball
- Location: Canada
- Year: 1977
- Builder: C&C Yachts
- Name: C&C 34

Boat
- Displacement: 10,100 lb (4,581 kg)
- Draft: 5.90 ft (1.80 m)

Hull
- Type: Monohull
- Construction: Fiberglass
- LOA: 33.5 ft (10.2 m)
- LWL: 25.92 ft (7.90 m)
- Beam: 11.00 ft (3.35 m)
- Engine: Universal Atomic 4 30 hp (22 kW) gasoline engine

Hull appendages
- Keel: fin keel
- Ballast: 4,100 lb (1,860 kg)
- Rudder: internally-mounted spade-type rudder

Rig
- General: Masthead sloop
- I foretriangle height: 44.00 ft (13.41 m)
- J foretriangle base: 14.00 ft (4.27 m)
- P mainsail luff: 38.25 ft (11.66 m)
- E mainsail foot: 10.92 ft (3.33 m)

Sails
- Mainsail area: 208.85 sq ft (19.403 m^{2})
- Jib/genoa area: 308.00 sq ft (28.614 m^{2})
- Total sail area: 516.85 sq ft (48.017 m^{2})

Racing
- PHRF: 105 (average)

The C&C 34 is a Canadian sailboat, that was designed by Robert W. Ball and first built in 1977.

The design was replaced in the C&C line in 1989 by a new Robert Ball design, the C&C 34/36.

== Production ==
The boat was built by C&C Yachts in Canada, but it is now out of production.

== Design ==
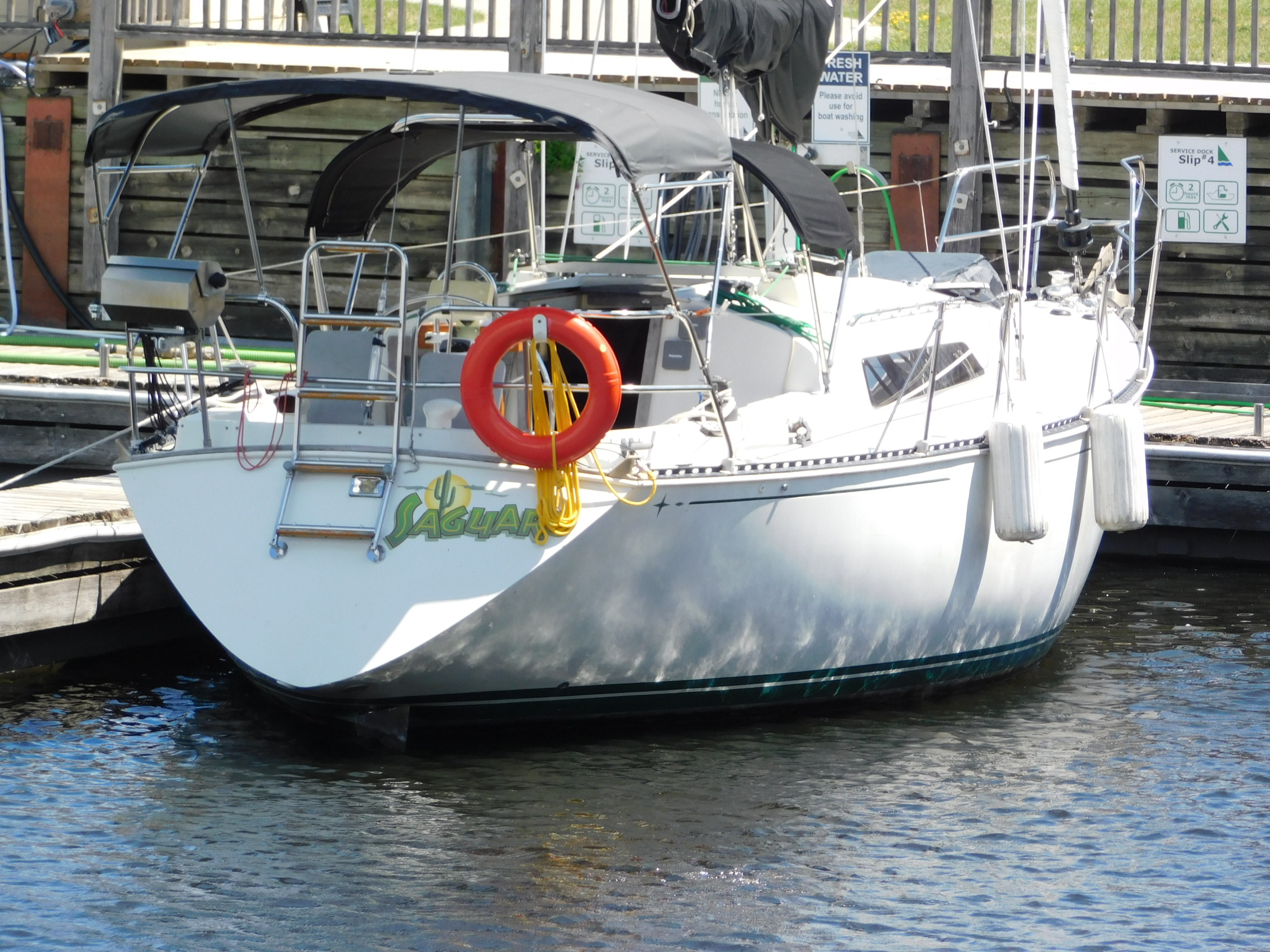
C&C 34

The C&C 34 is a small recreational keelboat, built predominantly of fiberglass, with wood trim. It has a masthead sloop rig, an internally-mounted spade-type rudder and a fixed fin keel or centreboard. It displaces 10,100 lb (4,581 kg) and carries 4,100 lb (1,860 kg) of lead ballast.

The boat has a draft of 5.90 ft (1.80 m) with the standard keel, 6.40 ft (1.95 m) with the optional deep keel. There was also an optional stub keel and centreboard version. That version has a draft of 6.90 ft (2.10 m) with the centreboard extended and 4.00 ft (1.22 m) with it retracted.

The boat is fitted with a Universal Atomic 4 30 hp (22 kW) gasoline engine. The fuel tank holds 20 U.S. gallons (76 L; 17 imp gal) and the fresh water tank has a capacity of 40 U.S. gallons (150 L; 33 imp gal).

The design has a PHRF racing average handicap of 105 with a high of 117 and low of 93. It has a hull speed of 6.82 kn (12.63 km/h).

== See also ==
- List of sailing boat types

Similar sailboats

- Beneteau 331
- Beneteau First Class 10
- Catalina 34
- Coast 34
- Columbia 34
- Columbia 34 Mark II
- Creekmore 34
- Crown 34
- CS 34
- Express 34
- Hunter 34
- San Juan 34
- Sea Sprite 34
- Sun Odyssey 349
- Tartan 34 C
- Tartan 34-2
- Viking 34
