= Creekmore 34 =

Sailboat class

Development
- Designer: Lee Creekmore
- Location: United States
- Year: 1975
- Builder: Creekmore Boats
- Role: Cruiser
- Name: Creekmore 34

Boat
- Displacement: 17,000 lb (7,711 kg)
- Draft: 4.90 ft (1.49 m)

Hull
- Type: Monohull
- Construction: Fiberglass
- LOA: 34.00 ft (10.36 m)
- LWL: 29.50 ft (8.99 m)
- Beam: 11.50 ft (3.51 m)
- Engine: Inboard motor

Hull appendages
- Keel: modified long keel
- Ballast: 7,000 lb (3,175 kg)
- Rudder: internally-mounted spade-type rudder

Rig
- Rig type: Bermuda rig
- I foretriangle height: 44.42 ft (13.54 m)
- J foretriangle base: 14.00 ft (4.27 m)
- P mainsail luff: 38.33 ft (11.68 m)
- E mainsail foot: 13.42 ft (4.09 m)

Sails
- Sailplan: Masthead sloop
- Mainsail area: 266.63 sq ft (24.771 m^{2})
- Jib/genoa area: 322.00 sq ft (29.915 m^{2})
- Total sail area: 588.63 sq ft (54.686 m^{2})

The Creekmore 34 is an American sailboat that was designed by Lee Creekmore as a cruiser and first built in 1975.

The Creekmore 34 design was developed into the Endeavour 37 in 1977. A hull from a Creekmore 34 was extended by 3 ft (0.9 m) and then used as a plug to create the mold for the Endeavour 37, which then went on to sell 476 examples.

== Production ==
The design was built by Creekmore Boats in the United States, starting in 1977, but it is now out of production.

== Design ==
The Creekmore 34 is a recreational keelboat, built predominantly of fiberglass, with wood trim. It has a masthead sloop rig, a raked stem, a reverse transom, a keel-mounted rudder and a fixed modified long keel, with a cut-away forefoot. It displaces 17,000 lb (7,711 kg) and carries 7,000 lb (3,175 kg) of ballast.

The boat has a draft of 4.90 ft (1.49 m) with the standard keel fitted. It is fitted with an inboard engine for docking and maneuvering.

The boat can be fitted with jib or a genoa for upwind sailing or a spinnaker for downwind sailing.

== See also ==
- List of sailing boat types

Related development

- Endeavour 37

Similar sailboats

- Beneteau 331
- Beneteau First Class 10
- C&C 34
- C&C 34/36
- Catalina 34
- Coast 34
- Columbia 34
- Columbia 34 Mark II
- Crown 34
- CS 34
- Express 34
- Hunter 34
- San Juan 34
- Sea Sprite 34
- Sun Odyssey 349
- Tartan 34 C
- Tartan 34-2
- Viking 34
