= Crown 34 =

Sailboat class

Development
- Designer: Hein Driehuyzen
- Location: Canada
- Year: 1975
- No. built: 30
- Builder: Calgan Marine
- Name: Crown 34

Boat
- Displacement: 10,500 lb (4,763 kg)
- Draft: 5.92 ft (1.80 m)

Hull
- Type: Monohull
- Construction: Fiberglass
- LOA: 33.80 ft (10.30 m)
- LWL: 27.92 ft (8.51 m)
- Beam: 10.92 ft (3.33 m)
- Engine: Yanmar 2QM15H 16 hp (12 kW) diesel engine

Hull appendages
- Keel: fin keel
- Ballast: 4,800 lb (2,177 kg)
- Rudder: skeg-mounted rudder

Rig
- General: Masthead sloop
- I foretriangle height: 45.20 ft (13.78 m)
- J foretriangle base: 14.80 ft (4.51 m)
- P mainsail luff: 38.80 ft (11.83 m)
- E mainsail foot: 10.90 ft (3.32 m)

Sails
- Mainsail area: 211.46 sq ft (19.645 m^{2})
- Jib/genoa area: 334.48 sq ft (31.074 m^{2})
- Total sail area: 545.94 sq ft (50.719 m^{2})

Racing
- PHRF: 138 (average)

The Crown 34 is a Canadian sailboat, that was designed by Hein Driehuyzen and first built in 1975.

The Crown 34 design was later developed into the San Juan 34 in 1980.

== Production ==
The boat was built by Calgan Marine in North Vancouver, BC, Canada, with 30 examples completed between 1975 and 1979.

After production of the Crown 34 ended in 1979, the molds were sold to GlassFab of Monroe, Washington, United States. That company only built five examples, under the name Sun 1020. The molds were then repossessed by Calgan and later sold again, this time to the Clark Boat Company in Kent, Washington. After some modifications, the design became the San Juan 34, which was introduced in 1980.

== Design ==
The Crown 34 is a small recreational keelboat, built predominantly of fiberglass, with wood trim. It has a masthead sloop rig, a reverse transom, a skeg-mounted rudder and a fixed fin keel. It displaces 10,500 lb (4,763 kg) and carries 4,800 lb (2,177 kg) of ballast.

The boat has a draft of 5.92 ft (1.80 m) with the standard keel fitted.

The boat is fitted with a Japanese Yanmar 2QM15H diesel engine of 16 hp (12 kW). The fuel tank holds 20 U.S. gallons (76 L; 17 imp gal) and the fresh water tank has a capacity of 30 U.S. gallons (110 L; 25 imp gal).

The boat has a PHRF racing average handicap of 138 and a hull speed of 7.08 kn (13.11 km/h).

== See also ==
- List of sailing boat types

Similar sailboats

- Beneteau 331
- Beneteau First Class 10
- C&C 34
- C&C 34/36
- Catalina 34
- Coast 34
- Columbia 34
- Columbia 34 Mark II
- Creekmore 34
- CS 34
- Express 34
- Hunter 34
- Sea Sprite 34
- Sun Odyssey 349
- Tartan 34 C
- Tartan 34-2
- Viking 34
