= Hylas Yachts =

Taiwanese yachts brand

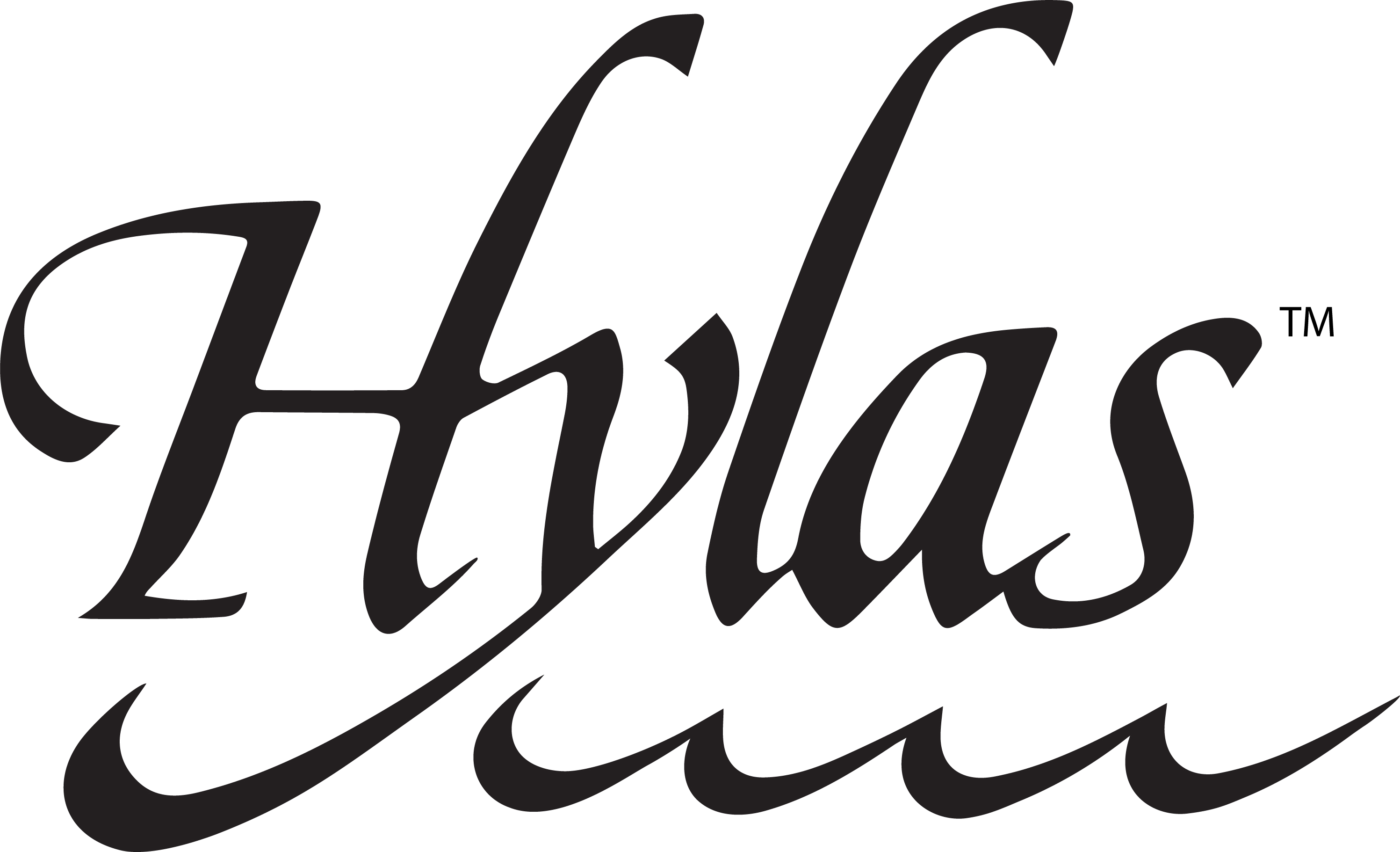
HYLAS YACHTS

Hylas Yachts is a brand of fiberglass, center-cockpit sailboats and luxury power yachts built in Taiwan by Queen Long Marine Ltd and designed by Sparkman & Stephens, German Frers, Bill Dixon and Salthouse of New Zealand. Sizes range from 42 to 70 feet. Joseph Huang, the president of Queen Long Marine, introduced the brand in 1984.

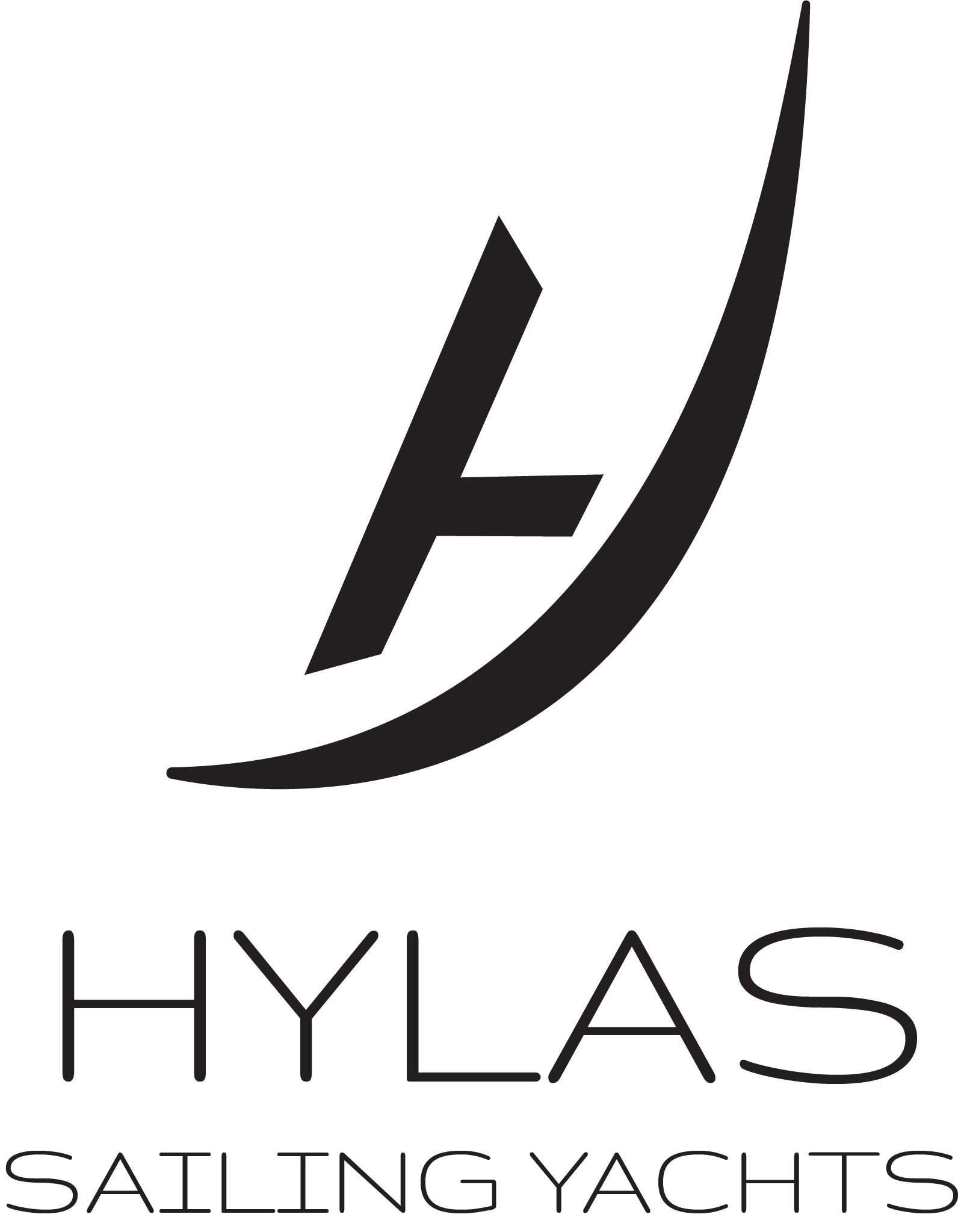
HYLAS SAILING YACHTS LINE

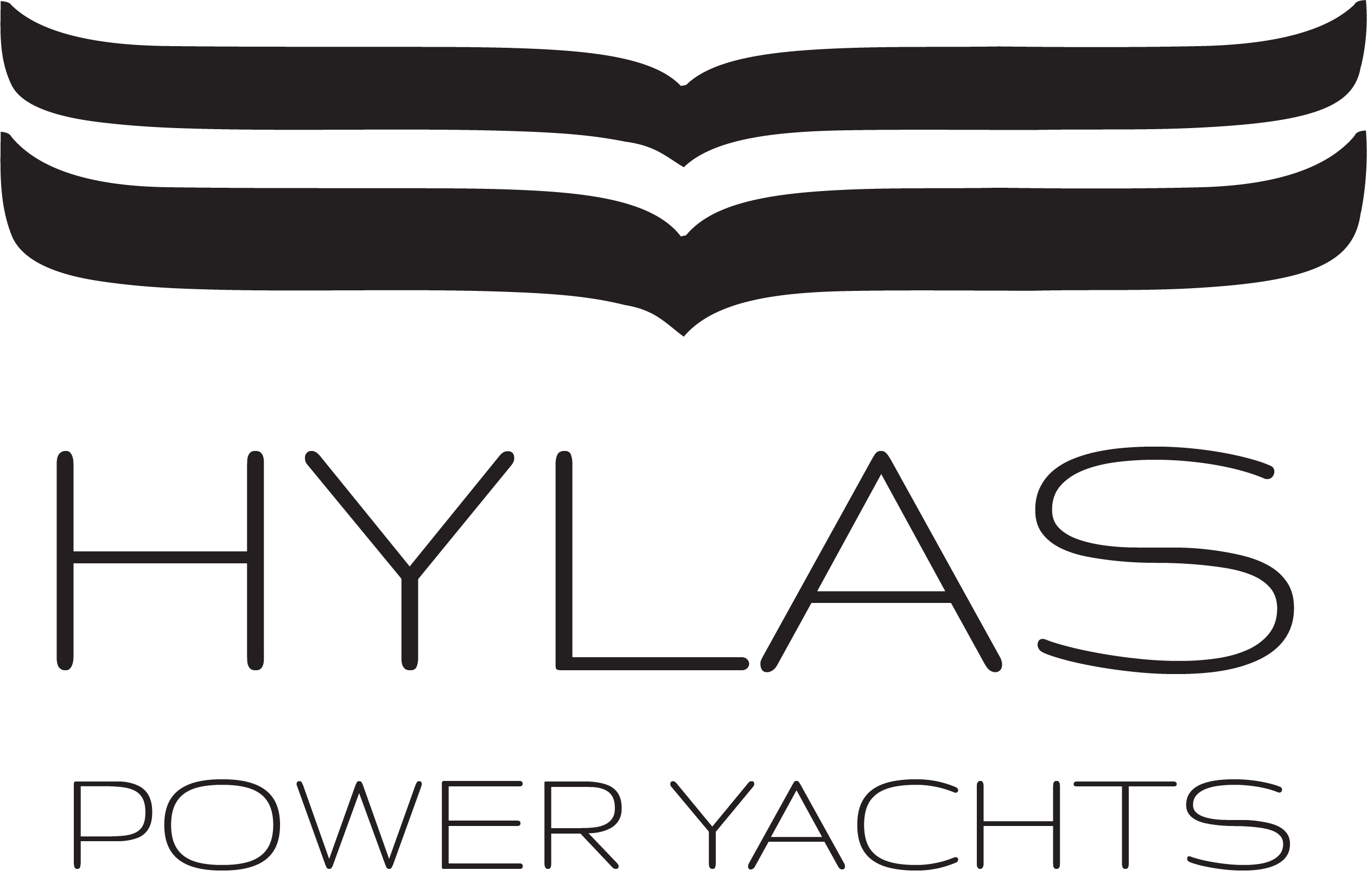
HYLAS POWER YACHTS LINE

== History ==
In the early 1980s, Joseph Huang of Queen Long Marine Ltd. partnered with Sparkman & Stephens to build a 47 foot sailboat called the Stevens 47. They named her after Bill Stevens of Stevens Yacht Charters because he ordered so many of the original boats. In 1984, Huang added two German Frers designs of 42 and 44 feet. He branded them Hylas after a Greek mythological youth associated with Hercules and the cruise of the Argonauts.

The Stevens 47 and Hylas 44 foot versions were popular charter sailboats. Along with Bill Stevens, Caribbean Yachts Charters (CYC) under Dick Jachney ran a charter fleet of 44 and 47 Hylases. Jachney split the cost of new Hylas Yachts with private owners in exchange for using their boat in the CYC fleet for a couple years. This allowed the owner to save considerably on a new Hylas. While a former charter boat could have been refitted, in general these are poorly outfitted for cruising and have high engine hours. The presence of high engine hours on chartered Hylas 44's is especially troubling because of the difficulty of repowering. In 1990, Joseph Huang and Dick Jachney joined forces and redesigned the 44 and 47 adding sugar scoop sterns into eventually the 46 and 49 versions. These 46 and 49 Hylases became the mainstay of the CYC fleet.

Around 1998, Hylas introduced a German Frers 54-foot model. In 2000, they introduced a raised saloon model of the same 54-foot Frers hull design. During this period, Hylas cut ties with CYC and became unaffiliated with any charter boat operation. During the 2005 Caribbean 1500 rally from Virginia to the British Virgin Islands, two 54 Hylases lost substantial portions of their rudders. The lower third of the rudders which was all foam and unattached to the partial skeg broke away under the high stress. These failures were later attributed to groundings prior to the passages. More recently, Hylas introduced a 63-foot Frers design which has been extended to 70 feet. In 2010, they introduced the 56 Frers, an extended version of the 54.

== Models ==
Hylas Sailing Yachts line offers H46, H48, H49, H56, H57, H60, H63 and H70 foot designs. The Hylas Power Yachts line M44 and M49. The H49 is a Tony Seifert modified version of the original Sparkman & Stephens designed 47-footer. All others are by German Frers and Bill Dixon. Queen Long Marine in Kaohsiung, Taiwan is the sole builder of Hylas Yachts. For the H56 and H70 foot models, they use Twaron, a Kevlar like aramid fiber.

Model	Designer	Notes
70	German Frers	Currently in production, comes in centerboard or fixed keel, has centerline queens forward/aft with 2 staterooms midships
66	German Frers	Out of production, rare
56	German Frers	Introduced in 2009 and in production. Extended version of 54. Likewise comes in standard or raised saloon deck molds.
54	German Frers	Comes in standard and raised saloon versions. The RS has a higher sole in the saloon with enlarged windows on cabin trunk compared to standard 54.
51	German Frers	Out of production, rare
49	Sparkman & Stephens, Tony Seifert	In production, elongated version of 47 with sugar scoop stern, higher freeboard, enlarged cockpit
47	Sparkman & Stephens	Out of production, first of Hylas models, originally branded Stevens 47
46	German Frers	In production, extended version of 44/45.5 with integrated sugar scoop stern and head forward with portside offset forward pullman berth
45.5	German Frers	Out of production, same hull design as the 44 with a sugar scoop stern added
44	German Frers	Out of production, arguably most successful design, succeeded by current 46
42	German Frers	Out of production, only aft cockpit Hylas, has an aft stateroom with centerline queen under cockpit sole

== See also ==
- List of sailboat designers and manufacturers
- List of boat builders
- Maritime industries of Taiwan
- Tayana Yachts
- Ta shing

== Resources ==
- Farrow-Gillespie, Liza, An Open Letter To Hylas, retrieved 2010-4-2
- Hylas Yachts Review, retrieved 2010-4-1
- Kretschmer, John (November 2008), Boat Test: Hylas 66, Sailing Magazine
- Kretschmer, John (October 2002), Boat Test: Hylas 54 RS, Sailing Magazine
- McGeary, Jeremy (May 2009), Hylas 70: Flagship of the Line, Cruising World
