= Tayana Yachts =

Taiwanese boat maker

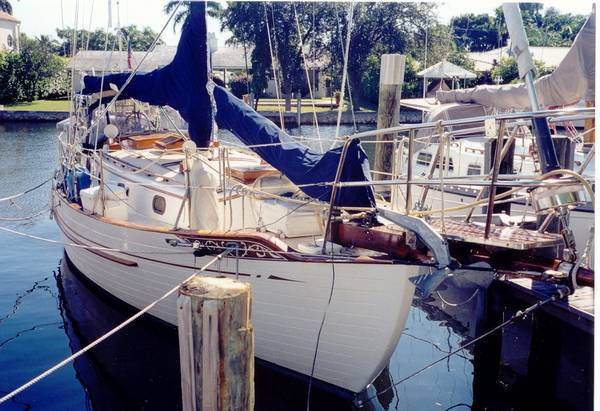
Tayana 37

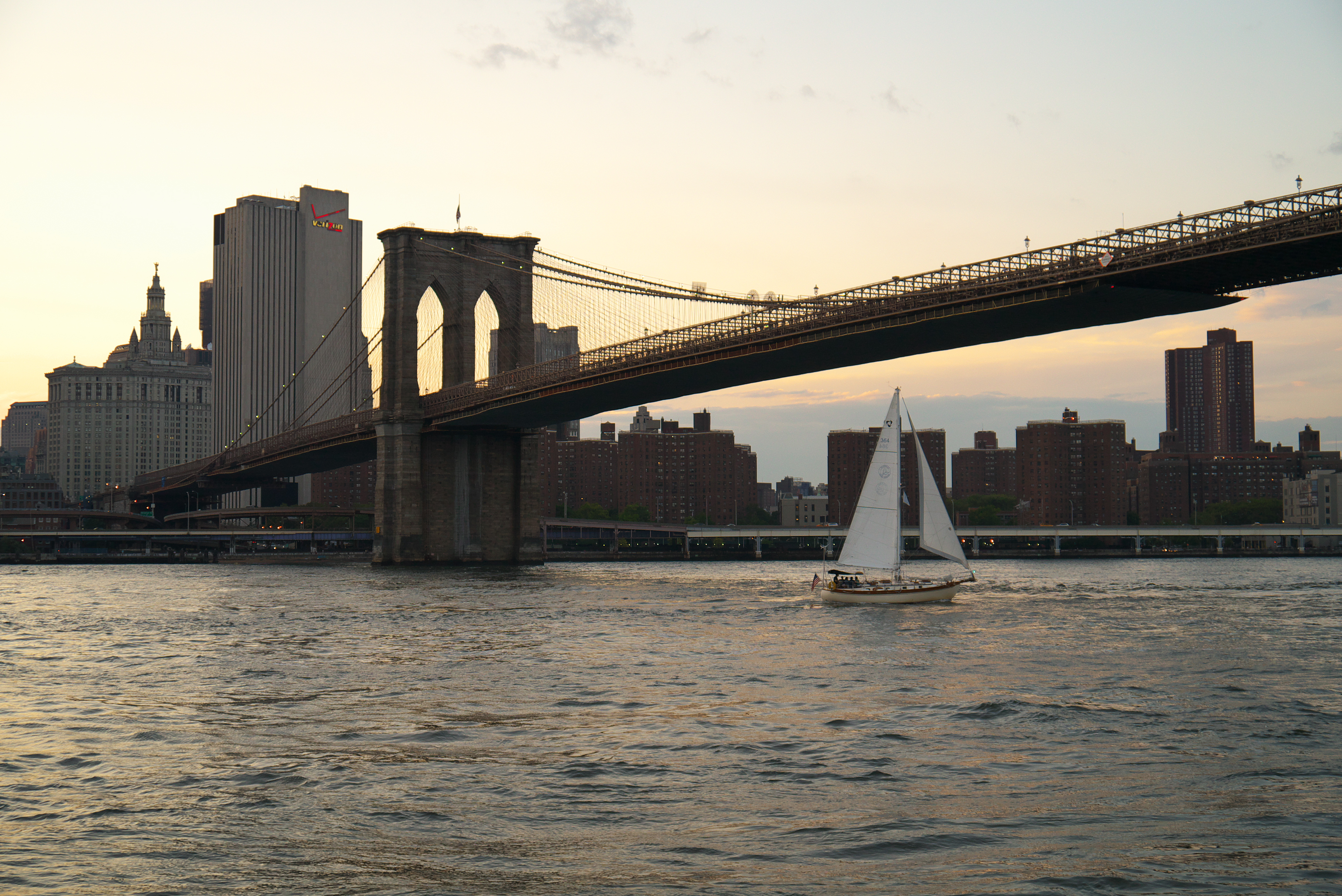
A Tayana 37 under sail on the East River in New York passes under the Brooklyn Bridge.

Tayana Yachts is a Taiwanese brand of fiberglass sailboats built by Kaohsiung-based Ta Yang company. Ta Yang means "big ocean" in Mandarin, and Tayana means "belongs to big ocean." The yard was founded in 1973 and has built over 1,400 bluewater cruisers. Designers have included Robert H. Perry, Robert Harris, Robb Ladd, and Pieter Beeldsnijder. Yachts range from 37 to a new 72-footer.

== History ==
Early models built by Ta Yang include the Sea Wolf 41, a.k.a. Yankee Clipper, and the Tanton cat ketch. In 1979, they introduced a Perry designed 37-foot double-ender. This was originally branded as the CT 37 because CT Chen was a founding partner in the Ta Yang boatyard, and they thought the more established CT name would help sell her. Soon, they realized she did not need the CT cachet, and they rebranded her as the Tayana 37. Around 600 of these 37-footers were built making it one of the most popular cruisers ever. The Tayana Vancouver 42 followed, another double-ender by Robert Harris. Ta Yang was one of the first Taiwanese yards to scale up with larger designs like the 50 foot Flying Dutchman 12 meter (FD-12) designed by Eva Holman and Wil Eicholt and the Bob Perry Tayana 48. As of 2016 Tayana had produced over 1,400 yachts. Ta Yang have been closed of business since 2020 September.

== See also ==
- List of companies of Taiwan
- Maritime industries of Taiwan
- Hylas Yachts
- Ta shing
