= C&C 36-1 =

Sailboat class

Development
- Designer: C&C Design
- Location: Canada
- Year: 1977
- Builder: C&C Yachts
- Name: C&C 36-1

Boat
- Displacement: 12,000 lb (5,443 kg)
- Draft: 5.92 ft (1.80 m)

Hull
- Type: Monohull
- Construction: Fiberglass
- LOA: 35.67 ft (10.87 m)
- LWL: 27.75 ft (8.46 m)
- Beam: 11.50 ft (3.51 m)
- Engine: Yanmar 3QM30 diesel engine

Hull appendages
- Keel: fin keel
- Ballast: 5,000 lb (2,268 kg)
- Rudder: internally-mounted spade-type rudder

Rig
- Rig type: Bermuda rig
- I foretriangle height: 47.50 ft (14.48 m)
- J foretriangle base: 15.00 ft (4.57 m)
- P mainsail luff: 41.50 ft (12.65 m)
- E mainsail foot: 11.70 ft (3.57 m)

Sails
- Sailplan: Fractional rigged sloop Masthead sloop
- Mainsail area: 242.78 sq ft (22.555 m^{2})
- Jib/genoa area: 356.25 sq ft (33.097 m^{2})
- Total sail area: 599.03 sq ft (55.652 m^{2})

Racing
- PHRF: 138 (average)

The C&C 36-1 is a Canadian sailboat that was designed by C&C Design and first built in 1977.

== Production ==
The boat was built by C&C Yachts in Canada, starting in 1977, but it is now out of production.

== Design ==
The C&C 36-1 is a small recreational keelboat, built predominantly of fiberglass, with wood trim. It has a masthead sloop rig, an internally-mounted spade-type rudder and a fixed fin keel. The fixed fin keel version displaces 12,000 lb (5,443 kg) and carries 5,000 lb (2,268 kg) of lead ballast. The centerboard version displaces 12,800 lb (5,806 kg) and carries 5,900 lb (2,676 kg) of lead ballast.

The boat has a draft of 5.92 ft (1.80 m) with the standard fin keel. A stub keel and centerboard was optional. That version of the boat has a draft of 7.50 ft (2.29 m) with the centreboard extended and 4.00 ft (1.22 m) with it retracted.

The boat is fitted with a Japanese Yanmar 3QM30 diesel engine. The fuel tank holds 20 U.S. gallons (76 L; 17 imp gal) and the fresh water tank has a capacity of 38 U.S. gallons (140 L; 32 imp gal).

The fix keel version has a PHRF racing average handicap of 132 with a high of 144 and low of 126. The centreboard version has a PHRF racing average handicap of 138 with a high of 144 and low of 135. All versions have hull speeds of 7.06 kn (13.08 km/h).

== See also ==
- List of sailing boat types

Similar sailboats

- Bayfield 36
- Beneteau 361
- C&C 110
- Catalina 36
- Columbia 36
- Coronado 35
- CS 36
- Ericson 36
- Frigate 36
- Hinterhoeller F3
- Hunter 36
- Hunter 36-2
- Hunter 36 Legend
- Hunter 36 Vision
- Invader 36
- Islander 36
- Nonsuch 36
- Portman 36
- S2 11.0
- Seidelmann 37
- Vancouver 36 (Harris)
- Watkins 36
- Watkins 36C
