= Dickerson 37 =

Sailboat class

Dickerson 37 CC
Development
- Designer: George Hazen
- Location: United States
- Year: 1980
- Builder: Dickerson Boatbuilders
- Role: Cruiser
- Name: Dickerson 37 CC

Boat
- Displacement: 15,950 lb (7,235 kg)
- Draft: 4.50 ft (1.37 m)

Hull
- Type: Monohull
- Construction: Fiberglass with an Airex core
- LOA: 37.00 ft (11.28 m)
- LWL: 28.83 ft (8.79 m)
- Beam: 11.50 ft (3.51 m)
- Engine: Perkins Engines 4-108 51 hp (38 kW) diesel engine

Hull appendages
- Keel: fin keel
- Ballast: 5,850 lb (2,654 kg)
- Rudder: skeg-mounted rudder

Rig
- Rig type: ketch
- I foretriangle height: 43.42 ft (13.23 m)
- J foretriangle base: 14.00 ft (4.27 m)
- P mainsail luff: 38.75 ft (11.81 m)
- E mainsail foot: 13.00 ft (3.96 m)

Sails
- Sailplan: Cutter rigged ketch
- Mainsail area: 251.88 sq ft (23.400 m^{2})
- Jib/genoa area: 303.94 sq ft (28.237 m^{2})
- Total sail area: 555.82 sq ft (51.637 m^{2})

The Dickerson 37 is an American sailboat that was designed by George Hazen as a cruiser and first built in 1980.

The design is often confused with a 1983 Bruce Farr racing sailboat design, that was also originally marketed by the manufacturer as the Dickerson 37, but is now usually referred to as the Dickerson 37 (Farr) to differentiate it from the unrelated 1980 design.

== Production ==
The design was built by Dickerson Boatbuilders in the United States, starting in 1980, but it is now out of production.

== Design ==
The Dickerson 37 is a recreational keelboat, built predominantly of fiberglass over an Airex core, with teak wood trim. It has an aft cockpit or optional center cockpit configuration and can have masthead sloop rig, cutter rig or ketch rig, with a mizzen mast. All have aluminum spars. It has a spooned raked stem, a raised counter transom, a skeg-mounted rudder controlled by a wheel and a fixed fin keel. It displaces 15,950 lb (7,235 kg) and carries 5,850 lb (2,654 kg) of ballast. Aft cockpit models have 6,000 lb (2,722 kg) of ballast.

The boat has a draft of 4.50 ft (1.37 m) with the standard keel fitted.

The boat is fitted with a British Perkins Engines 4-108 diesel engine of 51 hp (38 kW) for docking and maneuvering. The fuel tank holds 45 U.S. gallons (170 L; 37 imp gal) and the fresh water tank has a capacity of 90 U.S. gallons (340 L; 75 imp gal).

The center cockpit model was available with two interior arrangements. The "standard" has a forward "V"-berth, an L-shaped dinette berth, a main cabin settee berth and an aft cabin with two single fore-and-aft berths. The "athwartships aft berth" model provides a double berth facing starboard, in place of the two fore-and-aft berths. The aft cabin can be reached via its own companionway from the cockpit, or below by a passage from the main cabin. Ventilation is provided by main and bow cabin hatches, as well as opening ports.

The aft cockpit model was factory supplied in three different interior designs: "traditional", "tri-cabin" and "short handed". The "traditional" has a bow "V"-berth, with the head just aft, an aft starboard double berth, with a chart table just forward, a port side L-shaped dinette table, with a settee berth opposite and a galley located aft on the port side. The "tri-cabin" moves the aft double berth to the port side and creates an enclosed cabin, which includes the navigation station. The "short handed" eliminates the aft berth in favour of a larger navigation station and more aft storage, with the galley aft on the starboard side.

All arrangements include a galley with a three-burner alcohol-fired stove and pressurized water. The cabin sole is of teak and holly and an anchor locker is provided in the bow.

The on-deck woodwork is all teak, including the handrails, cap rails, bow platform and the cockpit coamings. The mizzen mast is equipped with a sail sheet traveler, while only the mainsail has a boom vang. The boat is equipped with three halyard winches and the genoa is sheeted via tracks to the two cockpit genoa winches, or four for cutter configuration boats. Jiffy reefing is installed for both the main and mizzen sails

== Operational history ==
In a 1994 review Richard Sherwood wrote, "the overhangs and sheer have been deliberately designed for a traditional appearance, but the center cockpit and aft cabin are modern. The Dickerson 37 is designed as a cruiser for two or three couples. Dickerson has specialized in cruising ketches for many years."

== See also ==
- List of sailing boat types

Related development

- Dickerson 41

Similar sailboats

- Alberg 37
- Baltic 37
- C&C 37
- CS 36
- Dockrell 37
- Endeavour 37
- Express 37
- Hunter 36-2
- Nor'Sea 37
- Tayana 37
