= Express 37 =

Sailboat class

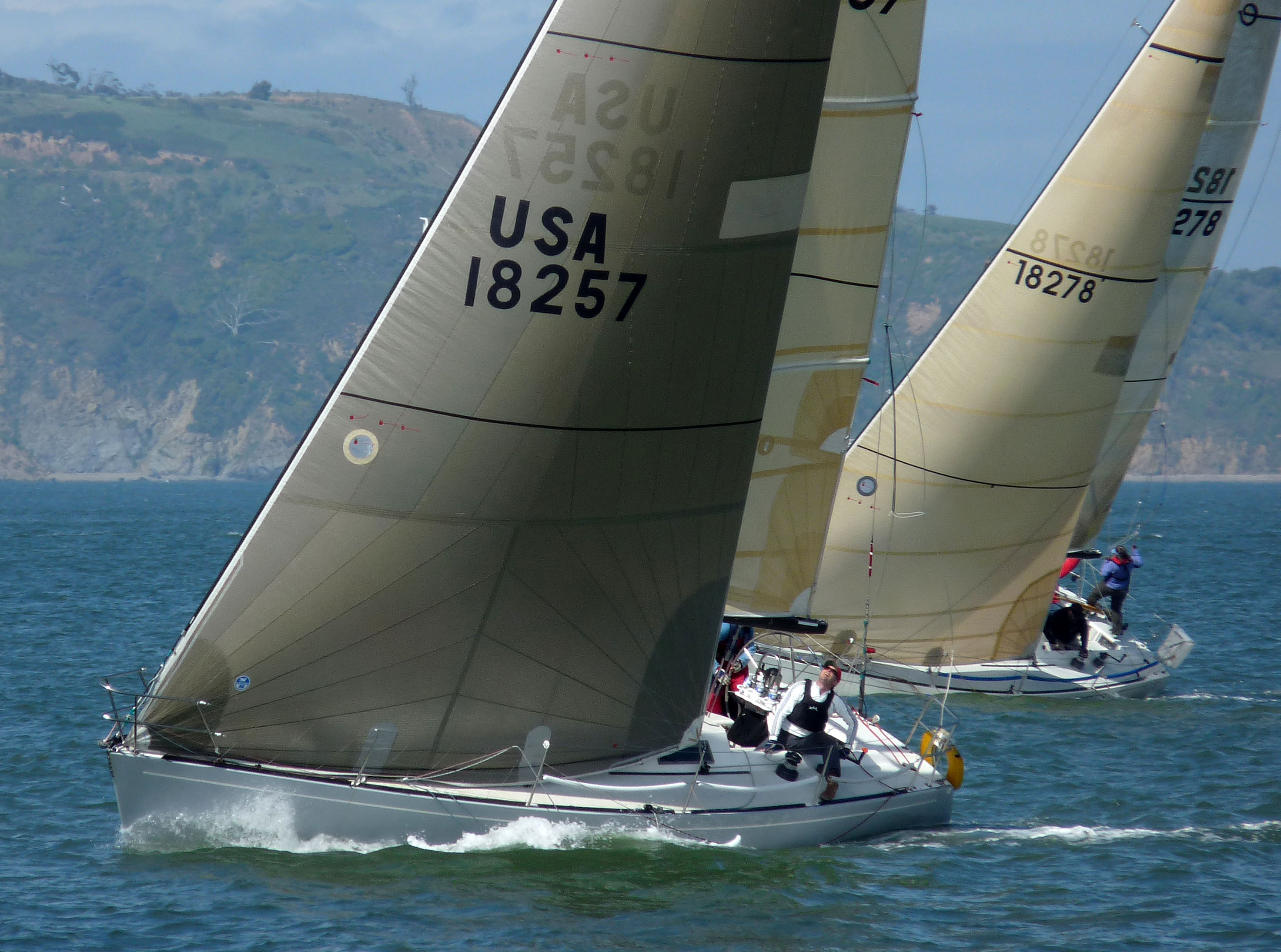
- Express 37s pHat Jack and Stewball racing on San Francisco Bay

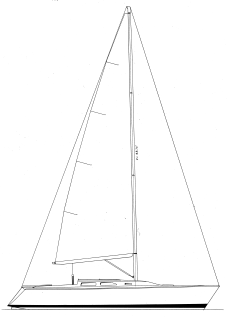

Development
- Designer: Carl Schumacher
- Location: United States
- Year: 1984
- No. built: 65
- Builder: Alsberg Brothers Boatworks
- Name: Express 37

Boat
- Displacement: 9,800 lb (4,445 kg)
- Draft: 7.25 ft (2.21 m)

Hull
- Type: Monohull
- Construction: Fiberglass
- LOA: 37.08 ft (11.30 m)
- LWL: 30.83 ft (9.40 m)
- Beam: 11.50 ft (3.51 m)
- Engine: Yanmar 2GMF 18 hp (13 kW) diesel engine

Hull appendages
- Keel: fin keel
- Ballast: 4,600 lb (2,087 kg)
- Rudder: internally-mounted spade-type rudder

Rig
- Rig type: Bermuda rig
- I foretriangle height: 48.75 ft (14.86 m)
- J foretriangle base: 14.33 ft (4.37 m)
- P mainsail luff: 42.00 ft (12.80 m)
- E mainsail foot: 13.75 ft (4.19 m)

Sails
- Sailplan: Masthead sloop
- Mainsail area: 288.75 sq ft (26.826 m^{2})
- Jib/genoa area: 349.29 sq ft (32.450 m^{2})
- Total sail area: 638.04 sq ft (59.276 m^{2})

The Express 37 is an American light displacement sailboat designed by Carl Schumacher as a racer-cruiser.

== Production ==
The design was built by Alsberg Brothers Boatworks in Santa Cruz, California from 1984 to 1988, but is now out of production. A total of 65 were completed.

== Design ==
The Express 37 is a recreational keelboat, built predominantly of fiberglass, with wood trim. It has a masthead sloop rig, a raked stem, a reverse transom, an internally mounted spade-type rudder controlled by a tiller and a fixed fin keel. It displaces 9,800 lb (4,445 kg) and carries 4,600 lb (2,087 kg) of lead ballast.

The boat has a draft of 7.25 ft (2.21 m) with the standard keel fitted. The later Mk II model offered an optional shallow draft keel of 5.92 ft (1.80 m).

The first 25 boats built were fitted with a Japanese Yanmar 2GMF two cylinder diesel engine of 18 hp (13 kW). Later boats had a three-cylinder Yanmar 3GMF diesel engine of 27 hp (20 kW). The fuel tank holds 30 U.S. gallons (110 L; 25 imp gal) and the fresh water tank has a capacity of 85 U.S. gallons (320 L; 71 imp gal).

The later Mk II version has a taller rig, an updated keel and rudder and a more cruising oriented interior. Only ten were built in this configuration.

== Operational history ==
The Express 37 finished first, second and third in its debut at the 1985 Transpacific Yacht Race.

In a 2005 used boat review in Sailing Magazine, writer John Kretschmer concluded of the design, "The Express 37 offers exhilarating performance both on and off the racecourse. And although one-design fleets are shrinking, most 37s have a lot of speed left in them. Also, following the trend of their boats, as racing sailors get older and migrate toward more casual sailing, a logical decision might be to convert a 37 into more of a cruising boat."

Marine surveyor and naval architect, Jack Hornor described the design in a 2007 review, "the Express 37 will appeal to sailors interested in racing more than the dedicated cruiser; although, there is no reason these mid-1980s models can’t serve double duty for prospective buyers looking for a reasonably priced, solidly constructed racer/cruiser...Although contemporary in appearance, Schumacher’s respect for the beauty of traditional, well balanced boats is apparent in this design."

== See also ==
- List of sailing boat types

Related development

- Express 27
- Express 34

Similar sailboats

- Alberg 37
- Baltic 37
- C&C 37
- Dickerson 37
- Dockrell 37
- Endeavour 37
- Hunter 36-2
- Nor'Sea 37
- Tayana 37
