= Dockrell 37 =

Sailboat class

Development
- Designer: Dockrell Yachts
- Location: United Kingdom
- Year: 1981
- Builder: Dockrell Yachts
- Role: Cruiser
- Name: Dockrell 37

Boat
- Displacement: 16,000 lb (7,257 kg)
- Draft: 7.50 ft (2.29 m), with centreboard down

Hull
- Type: Monohull
- Construction: Glassfibre
- LOA: 36.50 ft (11.13 m)
- LWL: 30.00 ft (9.14 m)
- Beam: 10.17 ft (3.10 m)
- Engine: Watermota Sea Panther or Yanmar 30 hp (22 kW) diesel engine

Hull appendages
- Keel: Stub keel with centreboard
- Rudder: Skeg-mounted rudder

Rig
- Rig type: Bermuda rig
- I foretriangle height: 38.00 ft (11.58 m)
- J foretriangle base: 15.00 ft (4.57 m)
- P mainsail luff: 34.50 ft (10.52 m)
- E mainsail foot: 12.00 ft (3.66 m)

Sails
- Sailplan: Cutter rigged sloop
- Mainsail area: 207.00 sq ft (19.231 m^{2})
- Jib/genoa area: 285.00 sq ft (26.477 m^{2})
- Total sail area: 492.00 sq ft (45.708 m^{2})

The Dockrell 37 is a British sailboat that was designed by Dockrell Yachts as a cruiser and first built in 1981.

== Production ==
The design was built by Dockrell Yachts in the United Kingdom, a company started by the American John Dockrell. The design is now out of production.

== Design ==
The Dockrell 37 is a recreational keelboat, built predominantly of glassfibre, with wood trim. It has a cutter rig, with aluminum spars and with the staysail utilizing a boom. The design features a spooned raked stem, a slightly reverse transom, a skeg-internally mounted rudder controlled by a tiller and a fixed stub keel with a retractable centreboard. It displaces 16,000 lb (7,257 kg).

The boat has a draft of 7.50 ft (2.29 m) with the centreboard extended and 3.75 ft (1.14 m) with it retracted, allowing operation in anchorages and other shallow water.

The boat is fitted with either a Ford Motors derivative Watermota Sea Panther or a Japanese Yanmar diesel engine of 30 hp (22 kW) for docking and manoeuvring. The propeller is keel-mounted. The fuel tank holds 20 U.S. gallons (76 L; 17 imp gal) and the fresh water tank has a capacity of 40 U.S. gallons (150 L; 33 imp gal).

The design provides sleeping accommodation for up to seven people. There is a bow "V"-berth, two settee berths in the main cabin and an aft double berth in a small stateroom. The galley is located aft on the starboard side, behind the companionway steps and includes a two-burner propane-fired stove, an electric refrigerator and a double sink. The head is located on the port side, just aft of the bow cabin. The main cabin has teak and mahogany wooden trim. An alternate cabin arrangement relocates the galley to the main cabin area, oriented fore-and-aft.

Ventilation is provided by two hatches, one over the main cabin and one over the aft cabin. The blunt front of the coach house also has opening ports. During production several different port configurations were used.

The cockpit is relatively small, but is self-draining.

== Operational history ==
In a review Richard Sherwood wrote, "this boat, built to Lloyds specifications, has the beam restricted to 10 feet for use in European canals or for overland transportation. She is light displacement, has a low wetted surface, and combines a fixed with a swing keel."

== See also ==
- List of sailing boat types

Similar sailboats

- Alberg 37
- Baltic 37
- C&C 37
- CS 36
- Dickerson 37
- Endeavour 37
- Express 37
- Hunter 36-2
- Nor'Sea 37
- Tayana 37
