= CS 36 =

Sailboat class

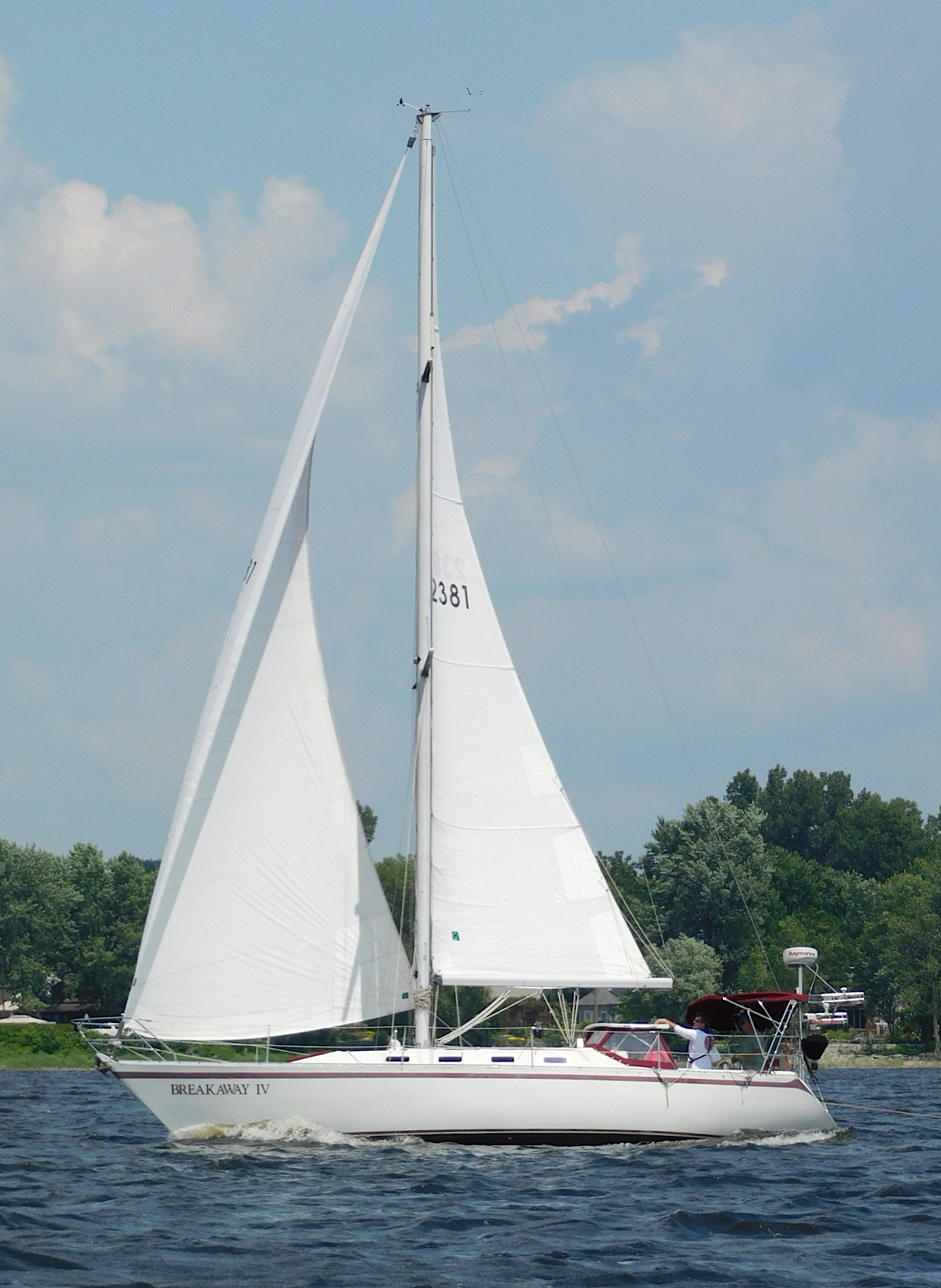

Development
- Designer: Raymond Wall
- Location: Canada
- Year: 1978
- No. built: 400
- Builder: CS Yachts
- Name: CS 36

Boat
- Displacement: 15,500 lb (7,031 kg)
- Draft: 6.25 ft (1.91 m)

Hull
- Type: Monohull
- Construction: Fiberglass
- LOA: 36.50 ft (11.13 m)
- LWL: 29.25 ft (8.92 m)
- Beam: 11.50 ft (3.51 m)
- Engine: Westerbeke diesel engine 30 hp (22 kW)

Hull appendages
- Keel: fin keel
- Ballast: 6,500 lb (2,948 kg)
- Rudder: internally-mounted spade-type rudder

Rig
- General: Masthead sloop
- I foretriangle height: 49.00 ft (14.94 m)
- J foretriangle base: 15.00 ft (4.57 m)
- P mainsail luff: 42.75 ft (13.03 m)
- E mainsail foot: 12.75 ft (3.89 m)

Sails
- Mainsail area: 272.53 sq ft (25.319 m^{2})
- Jib/genoa area: 367.50 sq ft (34.142 m^{2})
- Total sail area: 640.03 sq ft (59.461 m^{2})

Racing
- PHRF: 126 (average)

The CS 36 is a Canadian sailboat, that was designed by Raymond Wall as a cruiser and first built in 1978.

== Production ==
The design was built by CS Yachts in Canada who completed 400 boats between 1978 and 1987. The boat was a commercial success and 60 were sold in the first month it was produced.

It was replaced in the production line after nearly a year overlap in production by the CS 36 Merlin designed by Tony Castro. After the introduction of the CS 36 Merlin the CS 36 was referred to as the CS 36 Traditional.

== Design ==
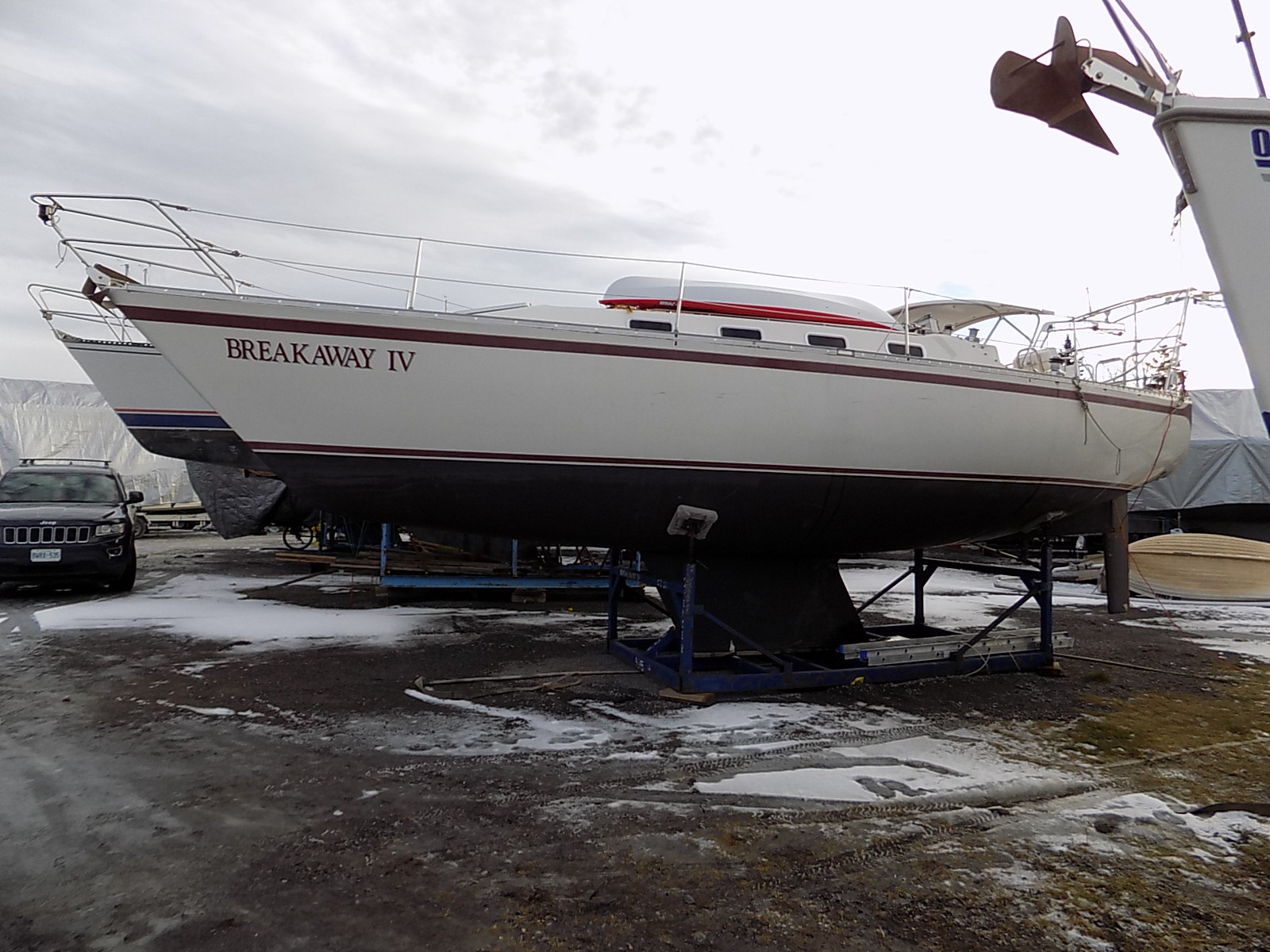
CS 36 on its cradle, showing the keel and rudder arrangement.

The CS 36 is a recreational keelboat, built predominantly of fiberglass, with a balsa wood-cored deck. It has a masthead sloop rig, an internally-mounted spade-type/transom-hung rudder and a fixed fin keel or optional shoal draft keel. The fin keel version displaces 15,500 lb (7,031 kg) and carries 6,500 lb (2,948 kg) of lead ballast. The shoal draft version displaces 15,650 lb (7,099 kg) and carries 6,650 lb (3,016 kg) of lead ballast.

The boat has a draft of 6.25 ft (1.91 m) with the standard keel and 4.92 ft (1.50 m) with the optional shoal draft keel.

The boat is fitted with a Westerbeke diesel engine of 30 hp (22 kW), or a Mitsubishi motor of 33 hp (25 kW) or a Volvo engine of 28 hp (21 kW). The fuel tank holds 42 U.S. gallons (160 L; 35 imp gal) and the fresh water tank has a capacity of 100 U.S. gallons (380 L; 83 imp gal).

The boat has a PHRF racing average handicap of 126 with a high of 135 and low of 123. It has a hull speed of 7.33 kn (13.58 km/h).

== Operational history ==
In a review of the CS 36 Traditional, Michael McGoldrick wrote, "the CS 36 is very much a traditional boat in the broader sense of the word insofar that it exemplifies the larger sailboats that were being built in the 1970s and early 1980s. This boat doesn't seem to have any design feature which is particularly outstanding, but everything comes together to produce a timeless design with pleasing proportions."

A 2017 used boat review in The Spin Sheet noted, "I generally don’t comment on the aesthetics of designs but the CS 36 is one of the best looking designs of the era and I think it's worthy of some comment on why. Aesthetically, the most important line of any design is the sheer line, and it would be hard to improve on the sheer Wall has drawn. If it were more curved, it would look exaggerated; less curved, and it would appear hogged or raised in the middle, as the boat normally heels under sail. The overhangs at the bow and stern are well balanced and the diagonal lines all complement one another. The cabin house and cockpit combings are styled so that they blend into the deck as if they were planned, not plopped down as an afterthought. The freeboard is necessarily high in order to provide ample headroom, but Wall has drawn an accent stripe below the sheer at just the right width and location to disguise the elevated freeboard without it becoming too prominent a feature. I'm not particularly fond of CS’s practice of finishing the transom to match the feature stripe color, but this is a minor point and easily remedied."

== See also ==
- List of sailing boat types

Similar sailboats

- Alberg 37
- Baltic 37
- Bayfield 36
- C&C 36-1
- C&C 37
- Catalina 36
- Columbia 36
- Coronado 35
- Crealock 37
- Dickerson 37
- Dockrell 37
- Endeavour 37
- Ericson 36
- Frigate 36
- Hinterhoeller F3
- Hunter 36
- Hunter 36-2
- Hunter 36 Legend
- Hunter 36 Vision
- Invader 36
- Islander 36
- Nonsuch 36
- Nor'Sea 37
- Portman 36
- Seidelmann 37
- Vancouver 36 (Harris)
- Watkins 36
- Watkins 36C
