= Alberg 37 =

Canadian traditional cruising keelboat

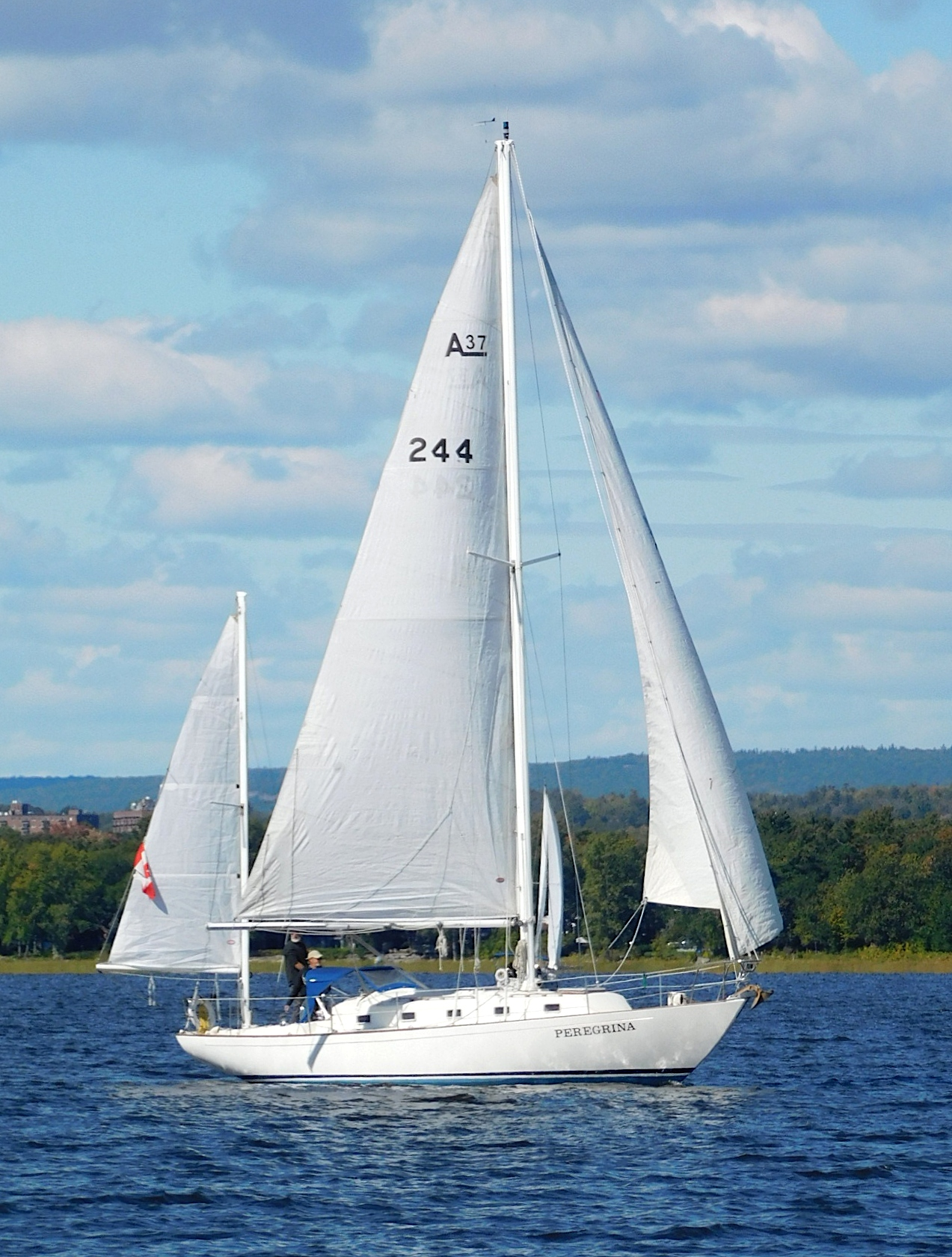
- Alberg 37 Yawl

Development
- Designer: Carl Alberg
- Location: Canada
- Year: 1967
- No. built: 248
- Builder: Whitby Boat Works
- Role: Racer-Cruiser

Boat
- Displacement: 16,800 lb (7,620 kg)
- Draft: 5.50 ft (1.68 m)

Hull
- Type: Monohull
- Construction: Fibreglass
- LOA: 37.17 ft (11.33 m)
- LWL: 26.50 ft (8.08 m)
- Beam: 10.17 ft (3.10 m)
- Engine: Volvo MD2003 28 hp (21 kW) diesel engine

Hull appendages
- Keel: long keel
- Ballast: 6,500 lb (2,948 kg)
- Rudder: keel-mounted rudder

Rig
- Rig type: Bermuda rig
- I foretriangle height: 44.25 ft (13.49 m)
- J foretriangle base: 14.00 ft (4.27 m)
- P mainsail luff: 38.50 ft (11.73 m)
- E mainsail foot: 17.50 ft (5.33 m)

Sails
- Sailplan: Masthead sloop
- Mainsail area: 336.88 sq ft (31.297 m^{2})
- Jib/genoa area: 309.75 sq ft (28.777 m^{2})
- Total sail area: 646.63 sq ft (60.074 m^{2})

Rating
- D-PN: 83.0
- PHRF: 162

The Alberg 37 is a bluewater capable keelboat designed by Carl Alberg and built in Canada from 1967 to 1988. A total of 248 were produced. Several Alberg 37s have made circumnavigations of the globe.

The fibreglass hull has a fixed long keel, to which the rudder is attached. The hull has long overhangs and a classic sheer It has a PHRF racing average handicap of 162 and a Portsmouth Yardstick of 83.0.

Factory diesel engines from Volvo Penta and Westerbeke were used.

The well ventilated and lit cabin is small compared to later designs, due to the relatively narrow beam.

It has a masthead sloop rig or optional yawl rig.
