= SV Merlin =

Racing yacht

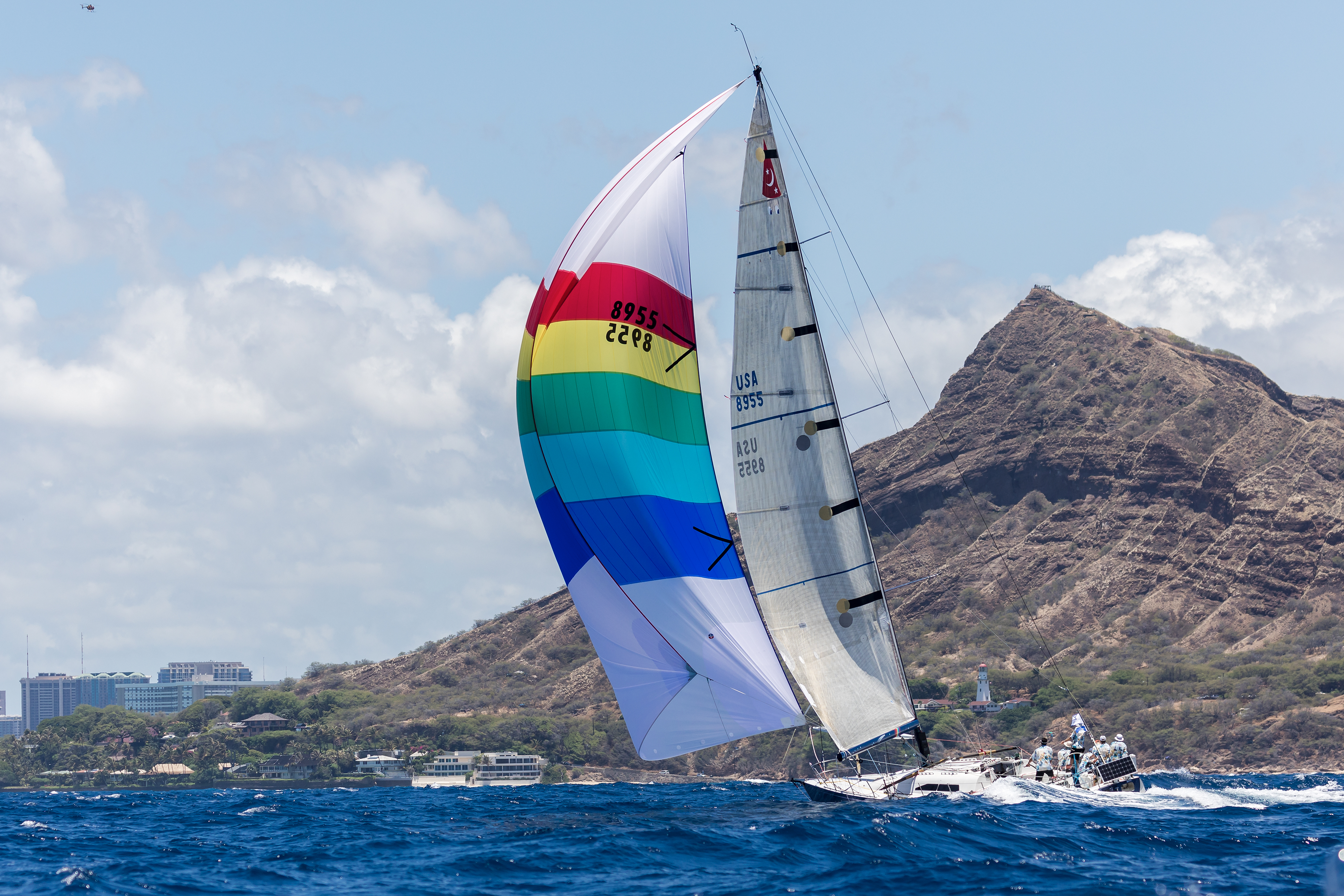
Merlin approaching Diamond Head

The Merlin is a 68 foot long by 12 foot wide monohull (ULDB) racing yacht designed by Bill Lee. Weighing 25,000 pounds, it is considered one of the most famous racing yachts in the United States, and has won numerous offshore yacht races including the Transpac (Transpacific Yacht Race) in 1977, establishing a course record that stood for 20 years. The victory became the subject of a feature article in Sports Illustrated, further enhancing its prestige. In 2017, Merlin was purchased by Chip Merlin.

== History ==
The Merlin was designed by Bill Lee and finished in 1976. In 1977, it set a race record at the Transpacific Yacht Race by finishing over 22 hours ahead of the previous record set in 1971. The record lasted 20 years until beaten by the Pyewacket in 1997.

William “Chip” F. Merlin purchased the Merlin in 2017. In 2018, it won three separate regattas. It also set another course record in the 50th running from St. Petersburg, FL, to Isla Mujeras.

== Design ==
Part of the reason why Merlin is lauded amongst the racing community is that it is heralded as the first of its kind. The design of the Merlin is considered to have started a new generation of ultra light displacement boat design. It is long, narrow, and light weight.

Lee’s innovative, yet at the time controversial, design reshaped the schematics applied to racing vessels. Lee’s background was certainly not given proper attention, as he held a mechanical engineering degree and worked in the defense industry performing stress and weight analysis tests on amphibious crafts and submarines prior to his yacht racing endeavors.

== Course Records ==
- July 1977: Transpacific Yacht Race from Los Angeles to Honolulu – Merlin set a record by finishing in 8 days, 11 hours, and 1 minute, beating Windward Passage’s 1971 record by over 22 hours. Merlin held this record for 20 years.
- February 1978: San Diego to Manzanillo, Mexico – Merlin won the 1,110-mile race, finishing first in the big boat class and fifth overall on corrected time.
- July 1978: Victoria, BC to Maui, Hawaii – Merlin set a new record finishing 2 days and 17 hours ahead of the previous record held by Grand Illusion.
- July 1980: Pacific Cup – San Francisco to Hawaii, finished first overall with a time of 10 days, 4 hours, 51 minutes, and 52 seconds.
- September 1983: Windjammer from San Francisco to Santa Cruz
- July 1987: Transpac from Los Angeles to Honolulu – Merlin was first to finish and became the third boat in Transpac history to score three elapsed time victories. The crew was awarded the Steve Newmark Seamanship Trophy.
- July 1995: Transpac from Los Angeles to Honolulu – First corrected overall yacht. Won the King Kalakaua Trophy.
- July 2017: Transpac from Los Angeles to Honolulu – Merlin, reacquired by Bill Lee, finished in 8 days, 2 hours, 34 minutes, and 9 seconds. Although this did not set any records, it did beat her 1977 time of 8 days, 11 hours, 1 minute, and 45 seconds.
- St. Petersburg, FL to Habana, Cuba (February 2018): first In Line Honors and first in its class, First to Finish.
- June 2018: Newport to Bermuda – Merlin finished with the fastest time out of eight yachts in Class 10, St David’s Lighthouse division, on June 19 at 16.11 and 52 seconds, an elapsed time of 97 hours 41 minutes 52 seconds.
- Regata del Sol, St. Petersburg, FL to Isla Mujeres, Mexico (April 2018): First to Finish in 1 day, 21 hours and 24 minutes, setting course record at the 50th Anniversary of this Regatta.

== Transpac’s The Merlin Trophy ==
In 2009, Trisha Steele, a fourth-generation Transpac racer and herself a former owner of Merlin, dedicated a new trophy, The Merlin Trophy, for the fastest elapsed time for the unlimited class of yachts competing in the Transpac Race. The trophy was built by Ken Gardiner and is a scale model of Merlin itself. The Merlin Trophy was for RSS 51 and 52 waiver yachts (exempt from the Racing Rules of Sailing limitations on moveable ballast and/or stored power) up to 100 feet with the shortest elapsed time but since 2019 the trophy has been awarded to yachts with manual power only, making previous winners like Alfa Romeo in 2009 now ineligible.

== Ownership ==
- 1977–1983, Bill Lee
- 1983–2000, Don Campion
- 2000-2002 (Briefly changed name to Merlin’s Reata), Al Micallef
- 2002–2004, Orange Coast College School of Sailing and Seamanship
- 2004—2007, Trisha Steele
- 2007—2008, Bill Lee or Donn Campion
- 2008-2015, Jere Sullivan
- 2015–2017, Bill and Lu Lee
- 2017—Present, William F. “Chip” Merlin
