= Alsberg Brothers Boatworks =

Sailboat manufacturer

- Company type: Privately held company
- Industry: Boat building
- Founded: 1982
- Founder: Terry and Peter Alsberg
- Defunct: 1988
- Fate: Out of business
- Headquarters: Santa Cruz, California, United States
- Products: Sailboats

Alsberg Brothers Boatworks was an American boat builder based in Santa Cruz, California. The company specialized in the design and manufacture of fiberglass racing sailboats.

The company was founded by Terry and Peter Alsberg in 1982 and went out of business in 1988. Terry Alsberg had previously worked for Moore Sailboats.

== History ==
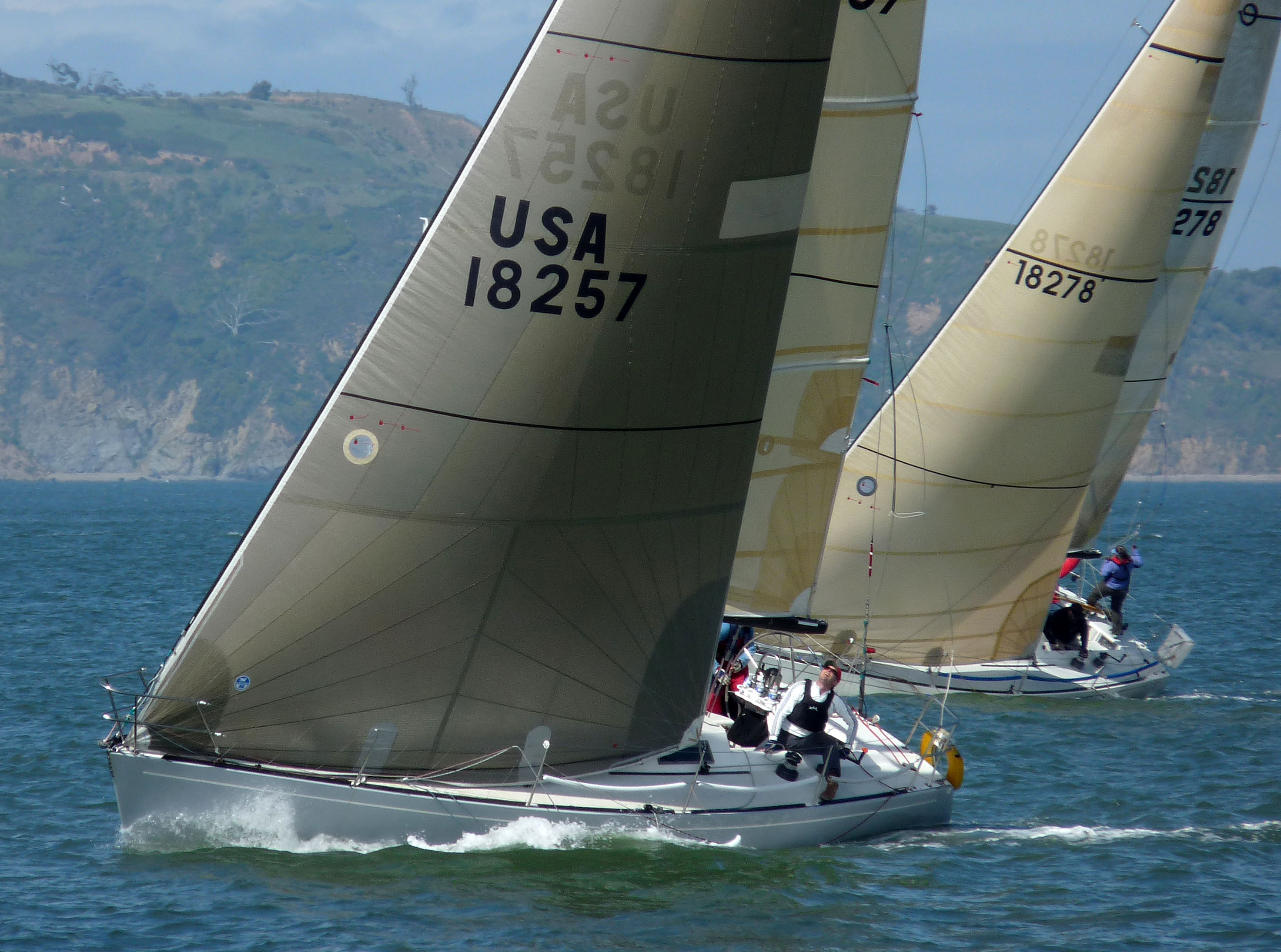
Two Express 37s on San Francisco Bay

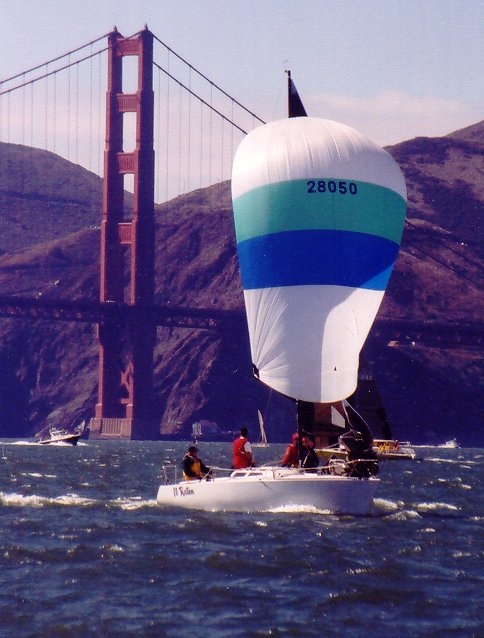
Express 27 on San Francisco Bay

The Alsberg brothers founded their company to build the Express 27, one of the first designs to be built using the vacuum bag moulding process. This boat was intended to compete with designs like the Moore 24 and the Olson 30 as an ultralight racer. Earlier designs in this class had proven fast on reaches and downwind, but did not go well to windward. Designer Carl Schumacher drew the Express 27 design and the company was formed to build it. The resulting boat became a quick commercial success and 117 were completed.

Designer Schumacher explained the 27's design origins in a 1985 interview in Latitude 38, "Terry and I started off with the idea of building a boat the same weight as a Moore 24, but two feet longer. But we eventually decided on the largest possible boat that could use a single speed (Barient 10) winch for the jib, which turned out to be 27 feet."

The company expanded to produce two more Schumacher designs, the Express 34 and 37, both enlarged versions of the basic Express 27 design.

The company went out of business in 1988, as a result of the effects of launching the company into the 1981 and 1982 recessions, plus low pricing. Founder Terry Alsberg explained, "we'd been building custom boats and selling them at production prices". The company had completed 210 boats in six years.

== Boats ==
Summary of boats built by Alsberg Brothers Boatworks:

- Express 27 - 117 built
- Express 34 - 28 built
- Express 37 - 65 built

== See also ==
- List of sailboat designers and manufacturers
