= Ron Moore (boat builder) =

Ron Moore is largely credited, along with George Olson and Bill Lee, to have given rise to the modern ULDB, or ultralight displacement boat. This yacht type revolutionized sailing as the modern world knows it, especially in downwind races as are common on California's West Coast.

The prototype for the Moore 24 Grendel was built by George Olson is his backyard in 1968. It measured 24' long and weighed just over 2000 lbs., less than half of what similar length sailboats in the marketplace displaced. The next development was Summertime which with various tweaks which became known as the Ultimate Wednesday Night Boat and proved itself repeatedly on the racecourse. The subsequent molds were taken from Summertime, and the production Moore 24 was born. Moore's boatyard was known as "the Reef" off of Soquel Ave in Santa Cruz.

Moore and his wife Martha, ran a boatyard that embodied the California Lifestyle, complete with barbecues and a hot tub. Sailing ULDBs required agile, athletic sailors that would prefer high performance surfing on big waves in windy conditions. Moore 24 sailors like Will Baylis, John Kostecki, Morgan Larson, and others have gone on to achieve the highest levels in world championship sailing and the America's Cup.

Other Moore 24 sailors like Dave Hodges and Jim Maloney, have also achieved highs in class performance, and have been active at the grass roots level of the class. They can be often be seen in the hazy fog enveloping the Santa Cruz harbor or torching up the San Francisco Bay on a wild broad reach off of Pt. Blunt. As new fleets and sailors have mushroomed up around the world, Moore has continually set the Santa Cruz tone of the class so often espoused by Bill Lee: "Fast is Fun".

Moore realised the diversity and excellence of the core sailing group in the Moore 24 class and supported the community at a grass roots level.
