= Santa Cruz harbor =

Harbor and marina in Santa Cruz, California

Coordinates: 36.9657838°N 122.0024618°W

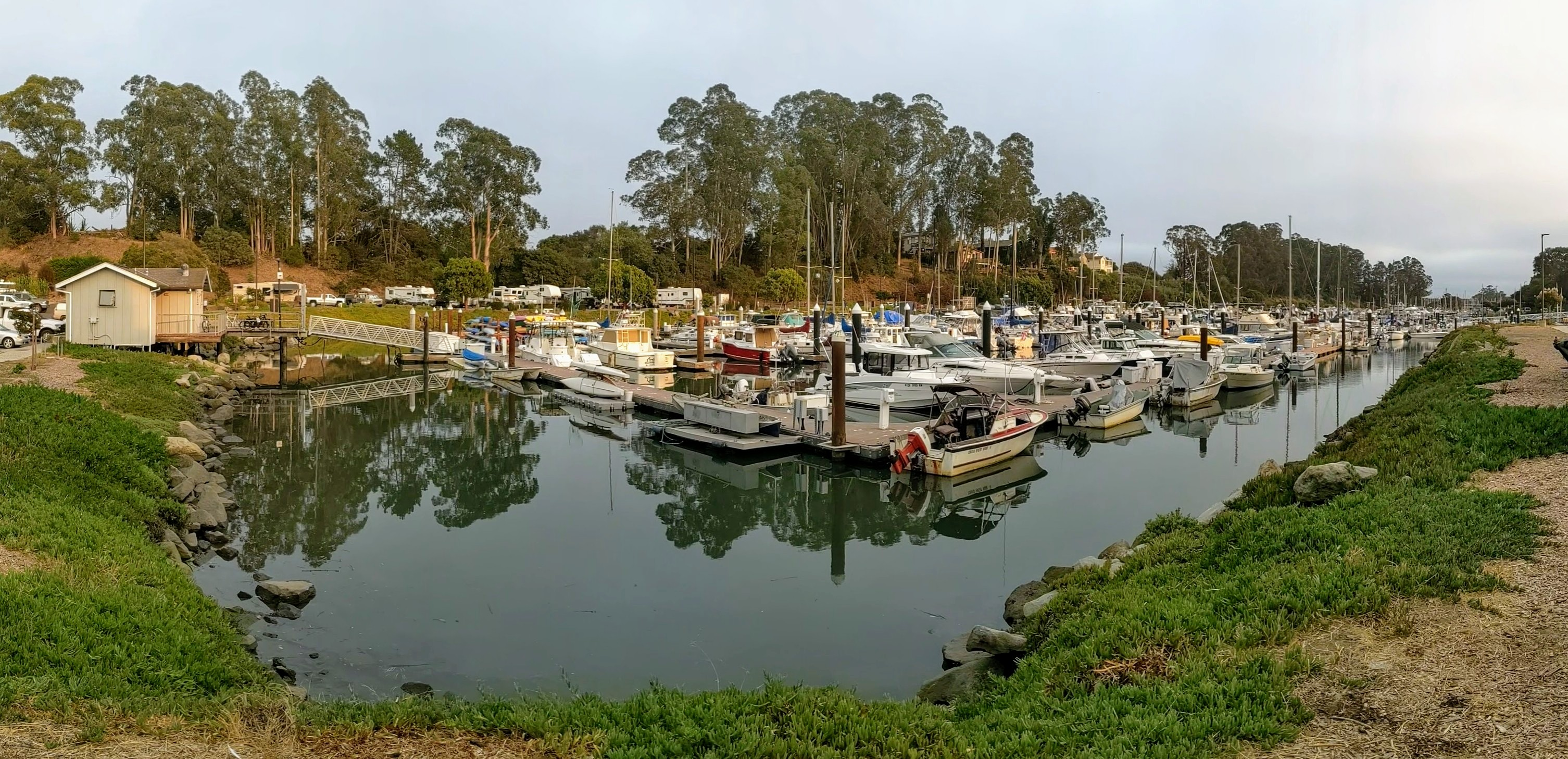
Santa Cruz Small Craft Harbor, from the northwest corner of the upper (north) part of the harbor

The Santa Cruz Small Craft Harbor (also "Santa Cruz Harbor", but see below) is situated in Santa Cruz, California, on the site of the former Woods Lagoon. Built in 1962–1963, its public use specializes in boating and extracurricular marine activities for the local community and visitors. The harbor straddles the city limits which runs down the center of Arana Gulch; the west side of the harbor is in Santa Cruz's Seabright neighborhood while the east is in unincorporated Santa Cruz County.

The harbor is split into two portions: the south or "lower" harbor and the north or "upper" harbor. The lower harbor was completed first and provides slips up to 60', and is itself split into an east and a west side. The west lower harbor contains docks AA, A–F, and FF; sailboat dry storage and hoist launch; a hand launch ramp for small, lightweight craft; and a small Coast Guard facility. It is adjacent to the Santa Cruz Yacht Club. It hosts a mixture of sail and power craft, and is the location for most of the harbor's slips over 40 feet. It is accessed off of Seabright and Atlantic avenues.

The east lower harbor has docks L–T, a boatyard, the harbor offices, a launch ramp, the harbor's fuel dock, and a number of harbor-related businesses. Most of the commercial fishing fleet is berthed there, including facilities for off-loading fish. Access is from 5th Avenue and East Cliff Drive; a water taxi connects the east and west lower harbor during the summer months.

The upper harbor is separated from the lower by two fixed bridges; one carrying Murray St, the other a railroad line. Due to the limited clearance, powerboats and smaller sailboats comprise most of the boats docked in the upper harbor; many of the sailboats must lower their masts to pass under. Docks G–J and U–X provide slips to 45'. The upper harbor also contains the harbor's maintenance base, two dry storage areas, and the harbor's RV park. Access to the upper harbor is from 7th Avenue.

== Recreation ==
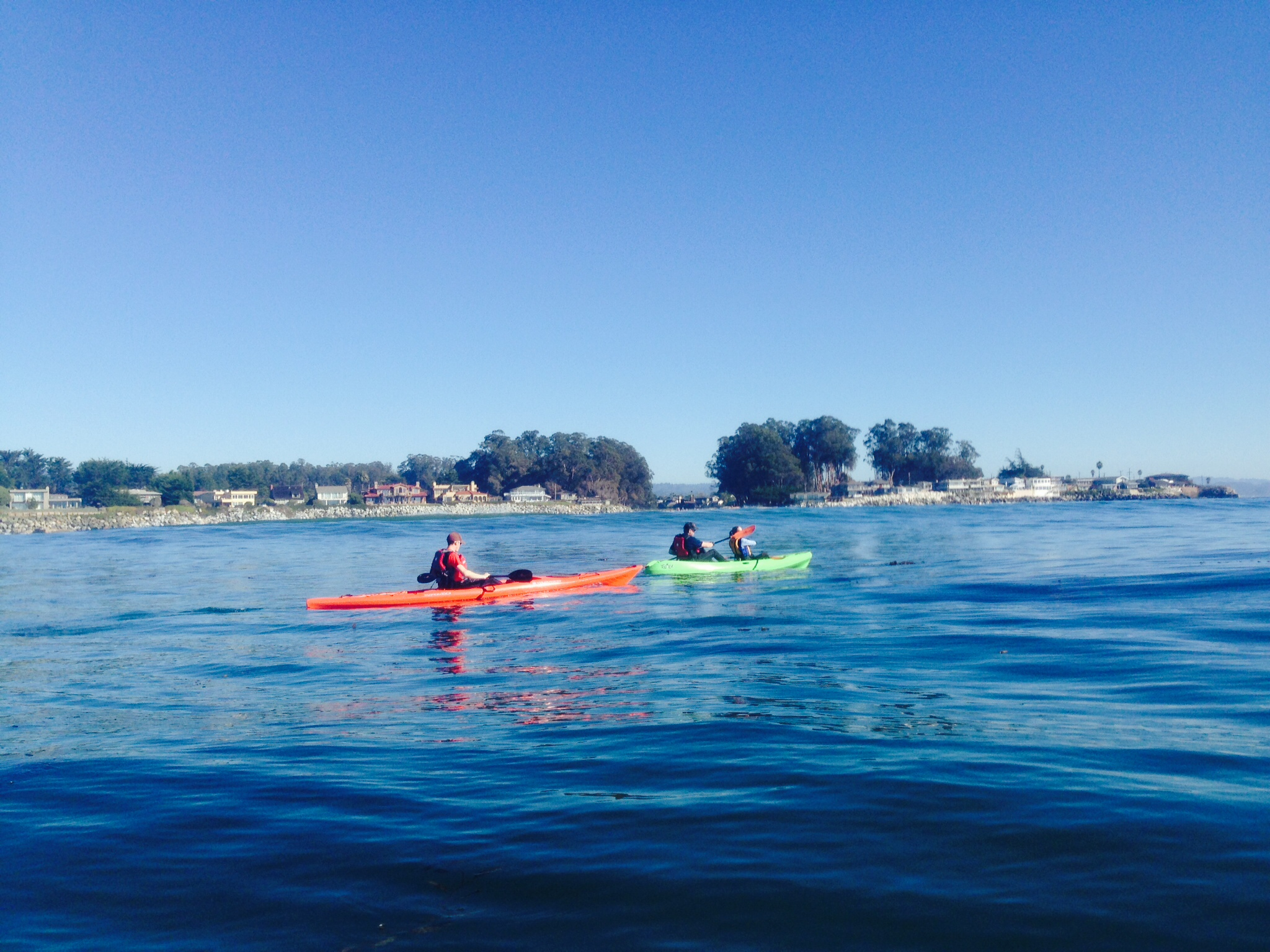
Photo of kayakers just outside the Santa Cruz harbor

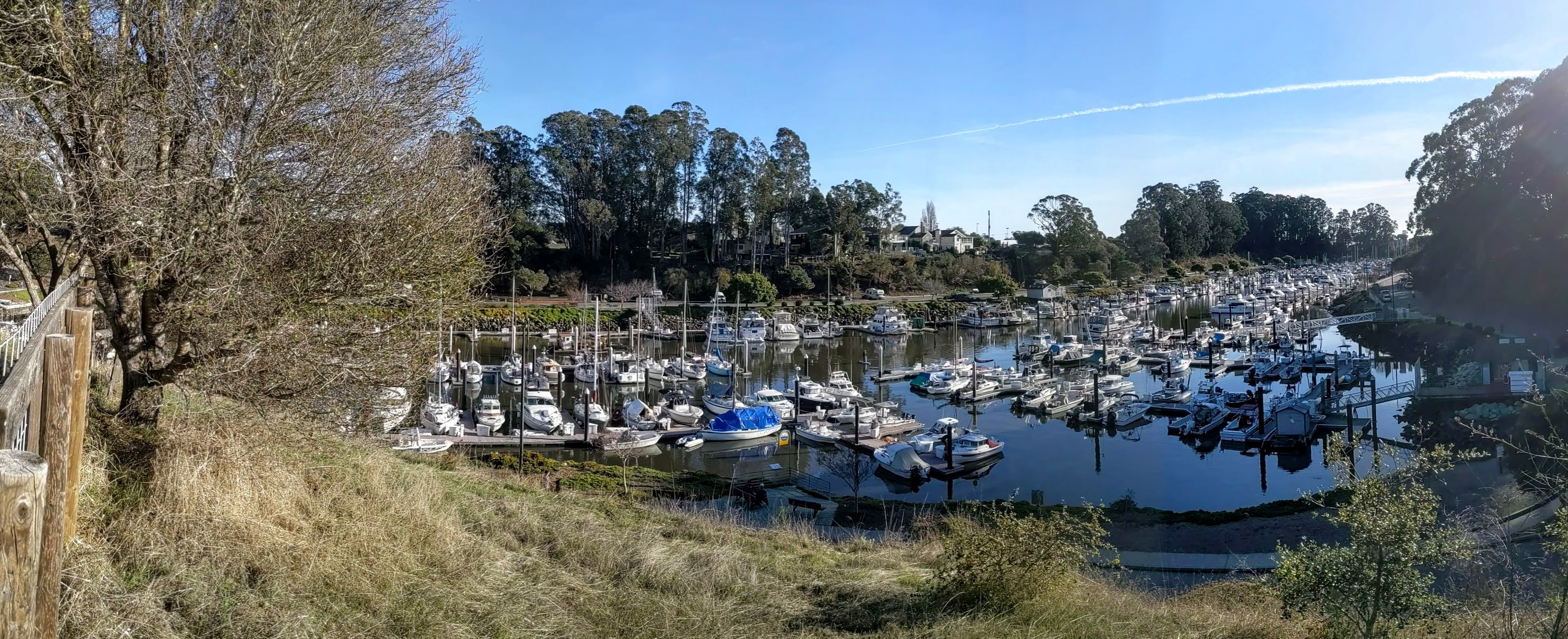
Santa Cruz upper harbor view from Arana Gulch trail in the adjacent Arana Gulch open space preserve

Visitors to the Santa Cruz harbor will find over 1,000 moored vessels available for commercial, recreational, or research opportunities. A boat dock and several launching facilities are also available to day visitors looking to rent kayaks, paddle boards, or boats from nearby businesses. Charter services are available for visitors interested in whale watching, fishing, or other marine activities. Outside of the water, the harbor is home to walking and hiking trails throughout historic Monterey Bay as well as an RV parking facility.

== A harbor of refuge ==
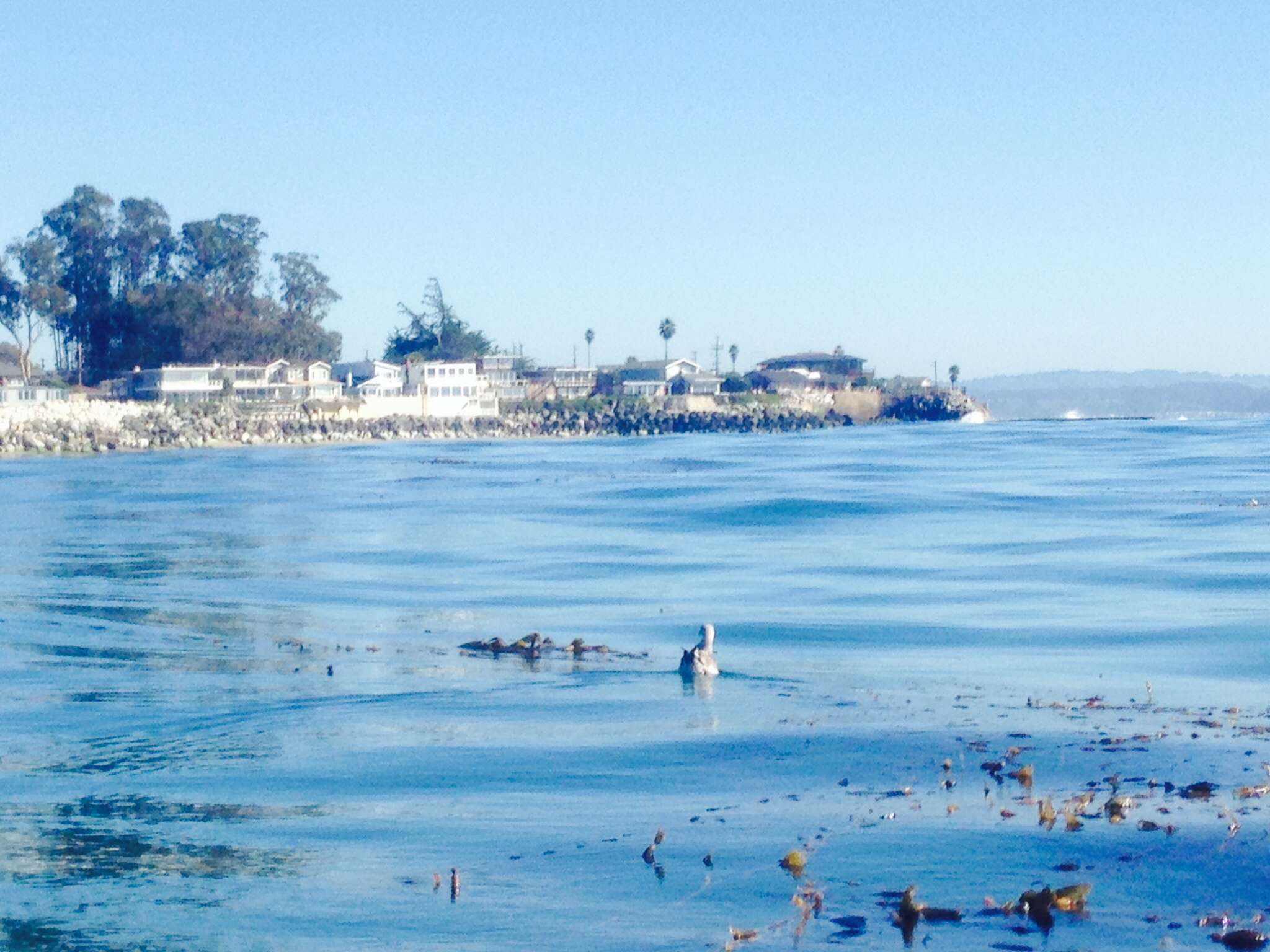
Photo of a seagull floating outside the Santa Cruz harbor.

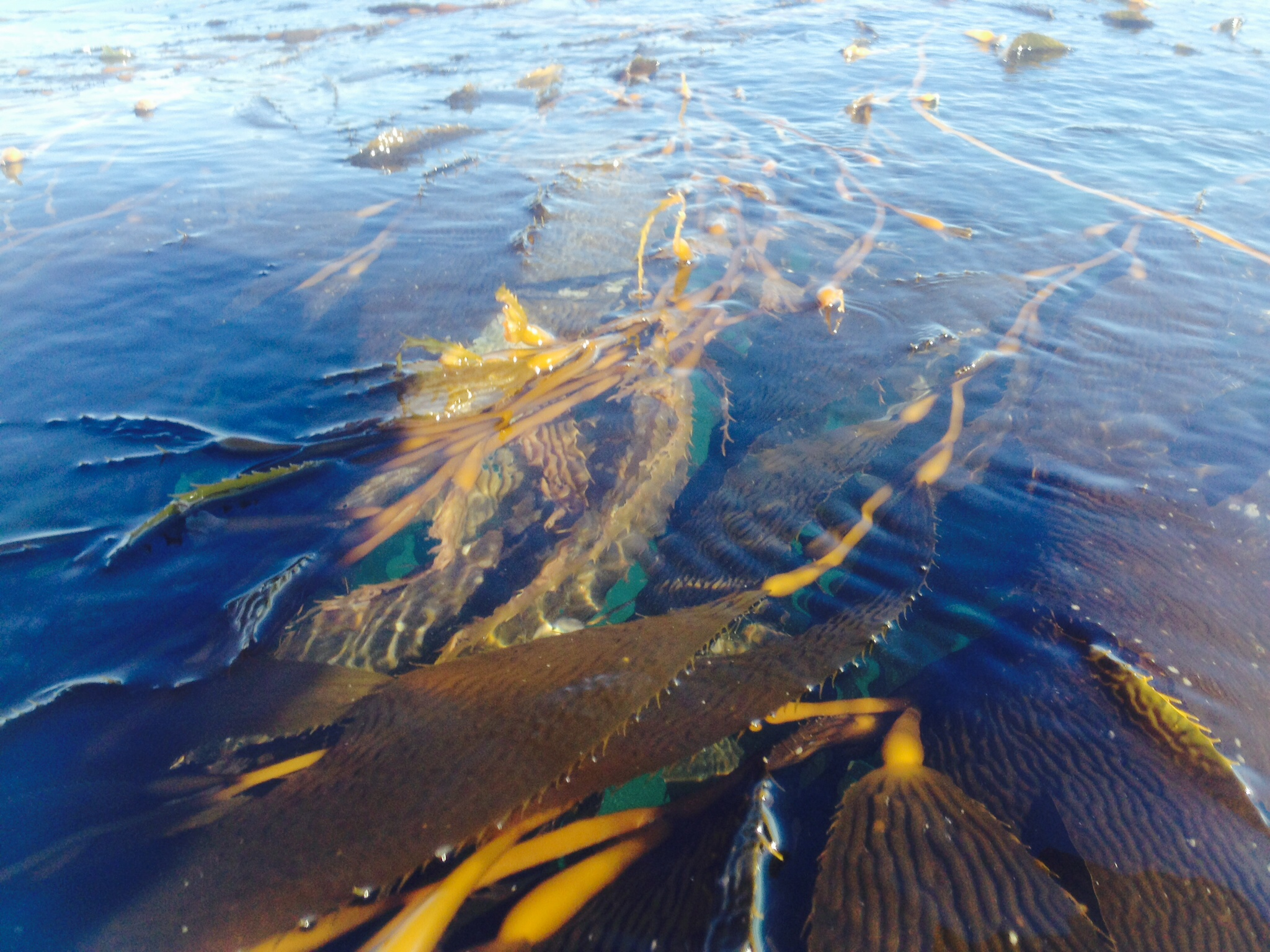
Photo of giant kelp floating just outside the Santa Cruz harbor

The Santa Cruz Harbor promotes the extracurricular enjoyment of marine actives as well as the preservation of local marine life. The harbor is part of the Monterey Bay National Marine Sanctuary, the largest marine sanctuary in the United States. The marine sanctuary is home to 26 species of marine mammals, 94 species of seabirds, 345 species of fish, 4 species of turtles, 31 phyla invertebrates, and over 450 species of marine algae and plants. Seasonal visitors to the Santa Cruz Harbor may see many different species of whales, sea otters, giant kelp and more.

== History ==
Between 1958 and 1960, the State Department of Parks and Recreation began acquiring land for the harbor and its supporting parking and concession areas. In 1962, Congress appropriated $1.6 million for jetty construction and the dredging of the original south harbor basin. Construction actually began on the south harbor in 1962, with the facility being completed in 1964, when 360 slips were dedicated.

On March 11, 2011, Santa Cruz harbor was struck by a tsunami from the 9.0 magnitude earthquake that hit Japan.

On January 15, 2022, the harbor was struck by a tsunami from a large volcanic explosion that hit Hunga Tonga–Hunga Ha'apai. Electrical systems, pilings, restrooms and showers were damaged and repair costs were estimated at US$6.5 million.

== Governance ==
The Santa Cruz Harbor is governed by five Commissioners who are elected to four year terms. Elections are held for either two or three of the commission positions each November (California Harbors & Navigation Code §6240.5). The commissioners in turn select a port district director who runs the affairs of the harbor. Current Port District Director Marian Olin was preceded by Lisa Ekers, Rick Smith, and Brian Foss.

== Santa Cruz Anchorage ==
The Santa Cruz Anchorage is the area to the east of Point Santa Cruz, west of the Santa Cruz Breakwater Light, and south of Cowell's, Main, and Seabright beaches. The anchorage is protected to the north and west but exposed to the south, and is a popular place for boats to anchor. It contains the Santa Cruz Wharf, where a public landing exits for users to come ashore, and is immediately south of the Santa Cruz Beach Boardwalk amusement park.

The anchorage was previously labelled as the "Santa Cruz Harbor" on charts, while the marina was labelled the "Santa Cruz Small Craft Harbor". To reduce confusion the name was changed in 2003 when a new revision of the Monterey Bay chart was published.
