= Webb Chiles =

American sailor and author (1941– )

- Born: November 11, 1941 (age 85); St. Louis, Missouri
- Occupation: Author
- Spouse: Carol Chiles

Webb Chiles (born 1941), born Webb Tedford, is an American sailor and author noted for his offshore sailing. He has completed six circumnavigations, several of them single-handed, and is the author of eight books.

== Early life ==
Webb Chiles was born in 1941 in St. Louis, Missouri, and moved to California in 1963.

== Sailing ==
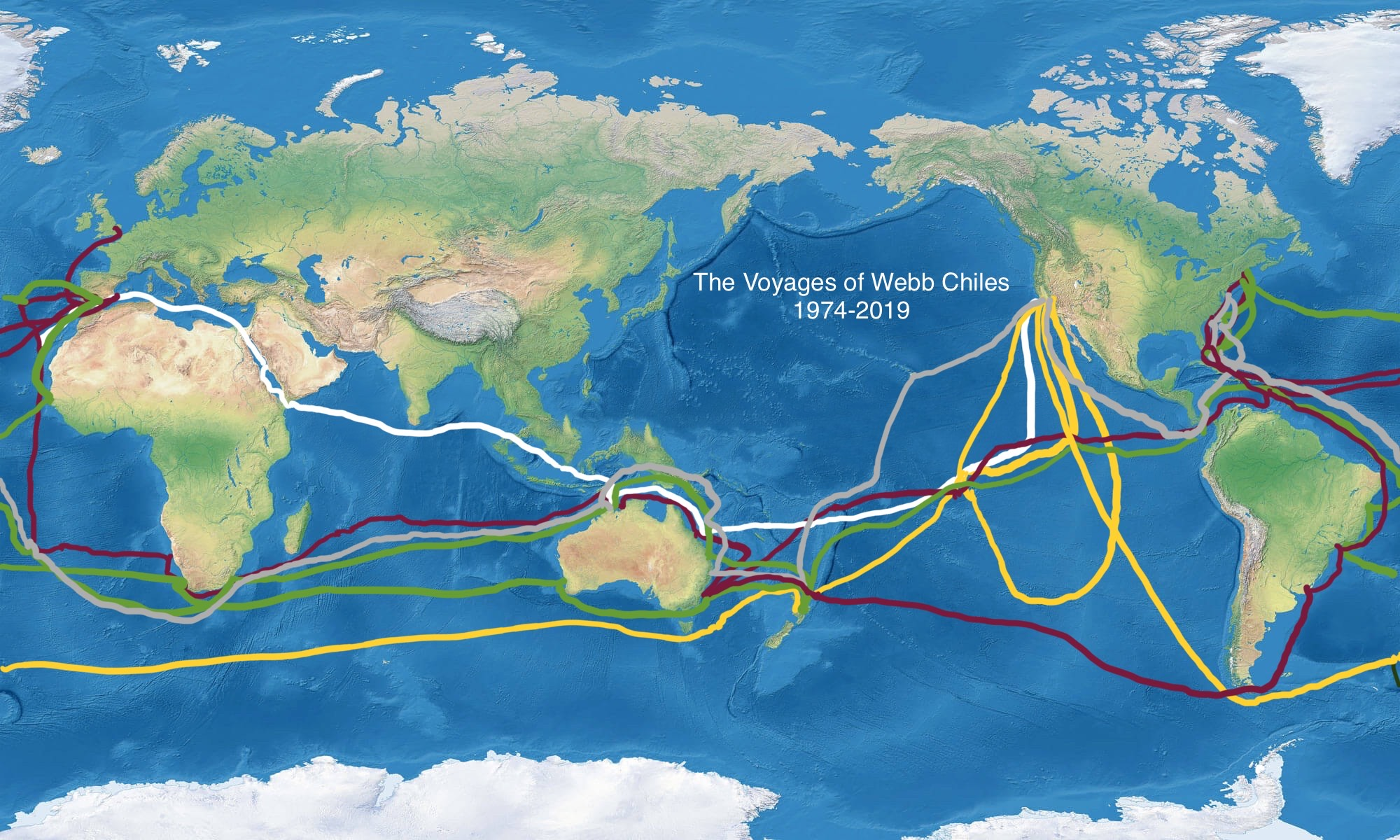
The colors of the lines are those of the boats who made them: Yellow: EGREGIOUS White: CHIDIOCK TICHBORNE 1 and 2 Red: RESURGAM Green: THE HAWKE OF TUONELA Gray: GANNET

=== First Circumnavigation ===
Leaving in October 1975, from San Diego, he set the record for the fastest solo circumnavigation in his Ericson 37 Egregious, with an eastwards passage around the three capes in 203 days. In this journey he also became the first American to round Cape Horn solo.

=== Subsequent circumnavigations ===
- 1978–1984
- 1984–1990
- 1991–2003
- 2008–2009
- 2014–2019 in Gannet, a Moore 24

== Published works ==
- Chiles, Webb. A Single Wave: Stories of Storms and Survival. Sheridan House, 1999.
- Chiles, Webb. Return to the Sea. Sheridan House, 2004.
- Chiles, Webb. Shadows. Amazon, 2011.
- Chiles, Webb. Storm Passage: Alone around Cape Horn. Times Books, 1977.
- Chiles, Webb. THE FIFTH CIRCLE: the Passage Log. Amazon, 2011.
- Chiles, Webb. The Ocean Waits. Norton, 1984.
- Chiles, Webb. The Open Boat: Across the Pacific. Norton, 1982.
- Chiles, Webb. Gannet 6: You're Not Too Old. Harbor Books, 2026.

== Recognition ==
Cruising Club of America, Bluewater Medal 2017

Ocean Cruising Club Jester Medal 2014

== See also ==
- Single-handed sailing
