= Bill Lee (yacht designer) =

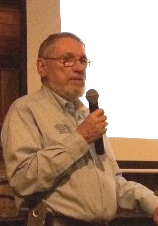
- Lee speaking at the Santa Cruz Yacht Club in February 2014
- Born: 1942 (age 83–84); Coeur d'Alene, Idaho
- Education: B.S. in Mechanical Engineering
- Alma mater: California Polytechnic State University
- Occupations: Boat Builder & Yacht Racer
- Known for: Designing & Building Merlin, Chutzpah, & Santa Cruz 27s

Bill Lee is the designer of noted ocean racing yachts, and one of the founders of the Santa Cruz school of boatbuilding. Known to many as the Wizard, Lee's designs achieved notoriety in the 1970s, with Chutzpah and Merlin having won the Transpacific Yacht Race from Los Angeles to Honolulu many times. Merlin set and held the course record between 1977 and 1997, making the 1977 crossing in only 8 days, 11 hours and 1 minute.

== Life ==
=== Early life ===
Originally from Idaho, Bill's family moved to Pasadena, California when bill was eight years old. When Bill was fifteen years old, his family moved again to Orange County's Newport Beach where he first began to sail in El Toro dinghies at age 15. Newport Beach provided many opportunities for Bill to interact with yachts, from the Sea Scouts to competitive ocean yachts. Bill Lee graduated from Cal Poly at San Luis Obispo in 1965 with a degree in mechanical engineering. His first job as an engineer was in Southern California in the defense industry evaluating armored personnel carriers, as well as other similar military tools. His evaluations included stress and weight analysis.

=== Santa Cruz Boat Building ===
At age 26, Lee first visited Santa Cruz with friends and began sailing in the Monterey Bay. This year, because of the presence of the 5O5 World Championship in Santa Cruz, Lee imagined building a 30-foot 5O5 and put himself to the task. The boat was completed in 1970 and was named Magic. Magic displaced 2,500 pounds and carried close to 450 square feet of sail and won the Monterey Bay series the following spring. The following year, Lee crewed for Art Biehi in Lee's first Transpacific Yacht Race where he was exposed to the conditions of the race and the expectations for victory. Lee is quoted reflecting to Biehi on how to win, "I told him that to win the Transpac (under the old conditions) you needed the smallest possible boat, the lowest possible rating, and the lightest possible boat, for little boats can surf when the bigger boats can't." With this insight, Biehi hired Lee to build his next boat.

Bill Lee built Witchcraft for Biehi, which launched in April, 1972. Witchcraft displaced 7,500 pounds and carried close to 600 square feet of sail area. Witchcraft also won the Mazatlan Race in 1972 and was credited with encouraging an evaluation of Transpac handicap ratings in 1973, which resulted in penalties for low displacement boats. Even so, Witchcraft's sister ship, Chutzpah, had won the 1973 Transpacific Yacht Race.

=== Post Boat Building ===
Bill Lee currently lives in Santa Cruz, California and sails regularly out of the Santa Cruz Yacht Harbor with the Santa Cruz Yacht Club. Bill works to connect boaters with yachts through his brokerage, Wizard Yachts, Ltd. located on the East side of the South Harbor in Santa Cruz, California.

== Boat Designs ==
Mr. Lee's designs are noted for having been narrower and much lighter, often half the weight of competitors at times. His designs helped define the class of boat known as an ultra light displacement boat (ULDB), which tend to excel at surfing downwind with spinnakers in heavy breeze. These boats required fewer crew, made better use of scarce resources in their construction, and generally attracted highly skilled sailors with big-wave surfing backgrounds at breaks such as Steamer's Lane and Mavericks. Many folks had to get their hair cut before sailing on one of Lee's ULDBs since they went so fast their hair often got quite tussled.

Mr Lee is also known for his boatyard on Hilltop Rd, Soquel, CA, known as "the Coop", as it was a chicken coop before Lee and his associates converted it into a boatyard.

=== Santa Cruz 27 ===
The Santa Cruz 27 was born by request in 1973 with the first customer asking, ""Quarter-tonner racing is really catching on here in Santa Barbara. I want a quarter tonner that is like WITCHCRAFT and CHUTZPAH only smaller." After only two iterations, the first Santa Cruz 27, VANISHING POINT was finished and was a roaring success. Approximately 145 Santa Cruz 27s were built in Bill Lee's boat yard in Soquel, California.

The Santa Cruz 27 is 27 feet long with 8 feet of beam, it carries a masthead rig with long J and short boom.

The molds and right to produce Santa Cruz 27's were sold after boat #141 and again after #145.

=== Santa Cruz 70 ===
After a rule change from the Transpac Committee set a maximum IOR rating of 70.0 for the race (Merlin rated 70.5), Bill Lee modified the design of Merlin to create a boat which would rate exactly 70. First launched in 1985, nineteen Santa Cruz 70's were built.

=== Merlin 68 ===
Merlin is an Ultra Light Displacement (ULDB) racing yacht constructed by famed yacht designer Bill Lee in 1977. At 68 x 12 ft. and 25,000 lbs., the vessel set multiple course records over its illustrious career. Merlin's unprecedented success on the racecourse includes winning the 1977 Transpacific Yacht Race, in which the vessel established a course record that stood for 20 years. The current owner is William F. "Chip" Merlin, founder of Merlin Law Group. Merlin currently races and maintains the boat as part of his team, Merlin Yacht Racing.

=== Boats of Note ===
- Chutzpah: 1973, 1975 Transpacific Yacht Race Overall Winner;
- Merlin: 1977, 1981, 1987 Transpac "First To Finish"; 1993 Transpac Division and Overall Winner; 1977 to 1997 Transpac "Fully Crewed Monohull Elapsed time" Record Holder for 8 days, 11 hours and 1 minute;
