= Rancho Potrero y Rincón de San Pedro Regalado =

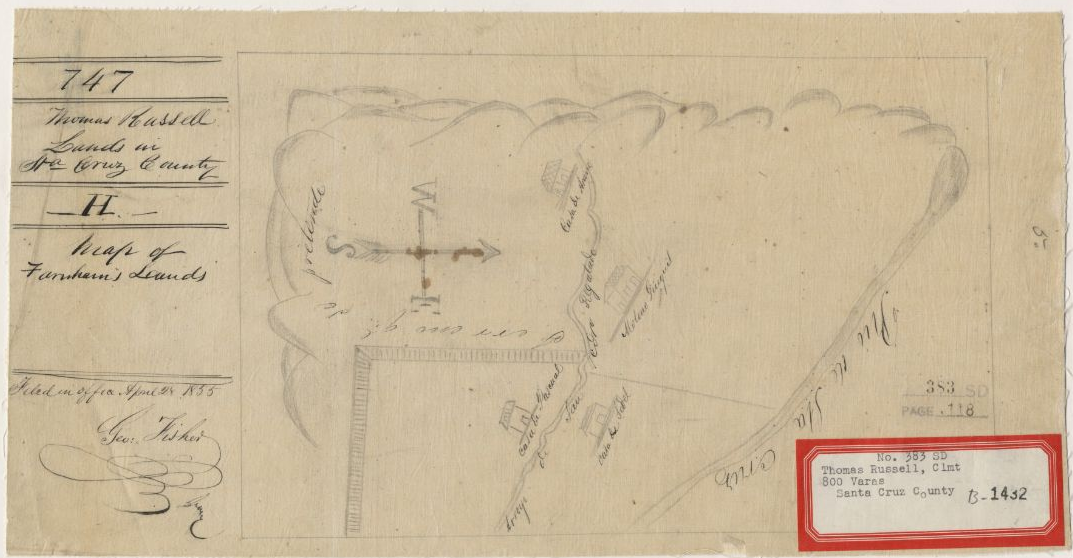
Thomas Russell's 1855 diseño

Rancho Potrero Y Rincon de San Pedro Regalado was one of the smallest Mexican land grants in Alta California. Unlike the huge ranchos comprising tens of thousands of acres, this one was only 500 varas by 600 varas (91.53 acres) of the pasture land (potrero) originally belonging to Mission Santa Cruz.

== History ==
Mission Santa Cruz was established in 1791, twelfth of the twenty-one Spanish Missions of California. After first trying to build near the San Lorenzo River, winter flooding convinced the padres to move up onto the bluff known ever since as Mission Hill. The low-lying river bottom north of the hill where mission buildings were constructed became the potrero, a protected pasture area where livestock other than free-ranging cattle were kept. The potrero was a relatively small flat area enclosed between steep hills and the river (a geographical form often referred to in early California as a rincón).

In 1834, the missions were secularized and, over the following years, most of the former mission lands were given away by the Alta California government as large land grants called ranchos. A rectangular portion of the former potrero land was granted in 1842 to José Arana, one of a group of colonists who came to Alta California from Mexico in 1834.

Arana later moved to the Rancho Arroyo del Rodeo, a few miles to the east. The creek running through his former lands there is now called Arana Gulch or Arana Creek. The rancho passed into the hands of pioneer Isaac Graham. In gratitude for his help during what came to be known as "The Graham Affair", Graham gave the tract to Thomas J. Farnham after Graham's return to the Santa Cruz area in 1841. Farnham died in San Francisco, in 1848, without ever taking possession of the land, but his widow Eliza moved west from New York the following year and decided to remain.

Renaming the tract El Rancho La Libertad, Eliza Farnham attempted to establish a farm and build a house. When that proved unsuccessful, she sold the land to Thomas Russell, who operated a distillery in the hills above. Russell filed a petition in 1855 to patent the original Mexican grant through the Public Land Commission.

Russell's diseño (a rough map required to accompany a land grant petition), shows the rancho lands on either side of a creek identified as "Arroyo de San Pedro Regalado". That spring-fed, year-round creek is still known today as San Pedro Regalado Creek (as seen in a close-up of the Openstreet.org map for this area) and flows into the San Lorenzo River. North of San Pedro Regalado Creek is nearby Pogonip Creek, which also flows out of Pogonip Open Space Preserve. Four structures are identified: three "casas" (houses) and a "molino" (mill). The San Lorenzo River is identified as the "Rio de Sta. Cruz".

Only a year later, Thomas Russell was murdered in a case that was never solved, and the land passed to his son Alexander before the grant was finally patented in 1859. Alexander was apparently still in possession of at least part of the rancho when the first complete map of Santa Cruz County land ownership was published in 1889 – the name "Russell" appears on the map in the potrero area.

== Today ==
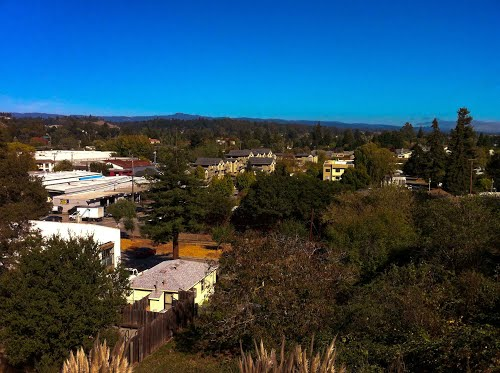
The Santa Cruz potrero today, looking north-east from Mission Hill

Since that time, the tract has been progressively subdivided. California State Route 1 crosses the area from northeast to southwest, while California State Route 9 runs south to its terminus at Highway 1. Paralleling Highway 9 are the tracks of the Santa Cruz, Big Trees and Pacific Railway. The area is bounded by hills on three sides, and the San Lorenzo River on the east.

The neighborhood south of Highway 1 is still known as the potrero, while the area north of the highway has become the mixed use, primarily light-industrial "Harvey West" neighborhood at the northern edge of the city of Santa Cruz, California.

The hills to the north and west of the potrero are now a city-owned open-space preserve called Pogonip. Uphill beyond the Pogonip greenbelt is the University of California, Santa Cruz.
