= Express 27 =

Sailboat class

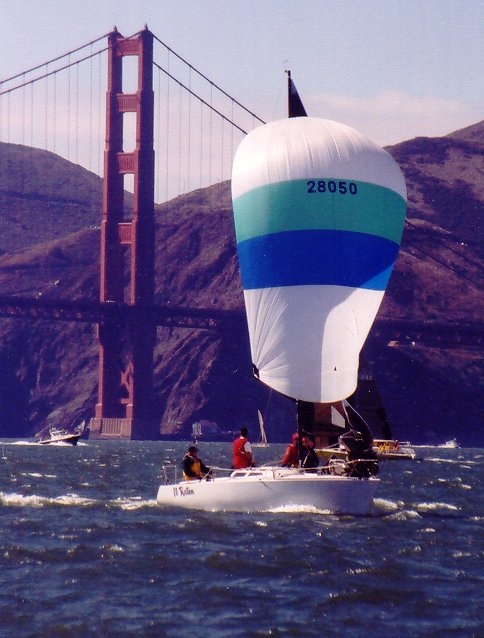

Development
- Designer: Carl Schumacher
- Location: United States
- Year: 1982
- No. built: 117
- Builder: Alsberg Brothers Boatworks
- Name: Express 27

Boat
- Displacement: 2,450 lb (1,111 kg)
- Draft: 4.50 ft (1.37 m)

Hull
- Type: Monohull
- Construction: Vinylester, S-glass, foam and a balsa core
- LOA: 27.25 ft (8.31 m)
- LWL: 23.75 ft (7.24 m)
- Beam: 8.17 ft (2.49 m)
- Engine: Outboard motor

Hull appendages
- Keel: fin keel
- Ballast: 1,100 lb (499 kg)
- Rudder: internally-mounted spade-type rudder

Rig
- Rig type: Bermuda rig
- I foretriangle height: 28.50 ft (8.69 m)
- J foretriangle base: 9.00 ft (2.74 m)
- P mainsail luff: 28.50 ft (8.69 m)
- E mainsail foot: 10.40 ft (3.17 m)

Sails
- Sailplan: Fractional rigged sloop
- Mainsail area: 148.20 sq ft (13.768 m^{2})
- Jib/genoa area: 128.25 sq ft (11.915 m^{2})
- Total sail area: 276.45 sq ft (25.683 m^{2})

Racing
- PHRF: 129-130 (average)

The Express 27 is an American trailerable sailboat that was designed by Carl Schumacher as a racer and first built in 1982.

== Production ==
The design was built by Alsberg Brothers Boatworks in Santa Cruz, California, United States. The company completed 117 examples between 1982 and 1988 when the factory closed. The boat was the first design offered when the company was formed and was the basis for the entire line of sailboats that it built.

== Design ==
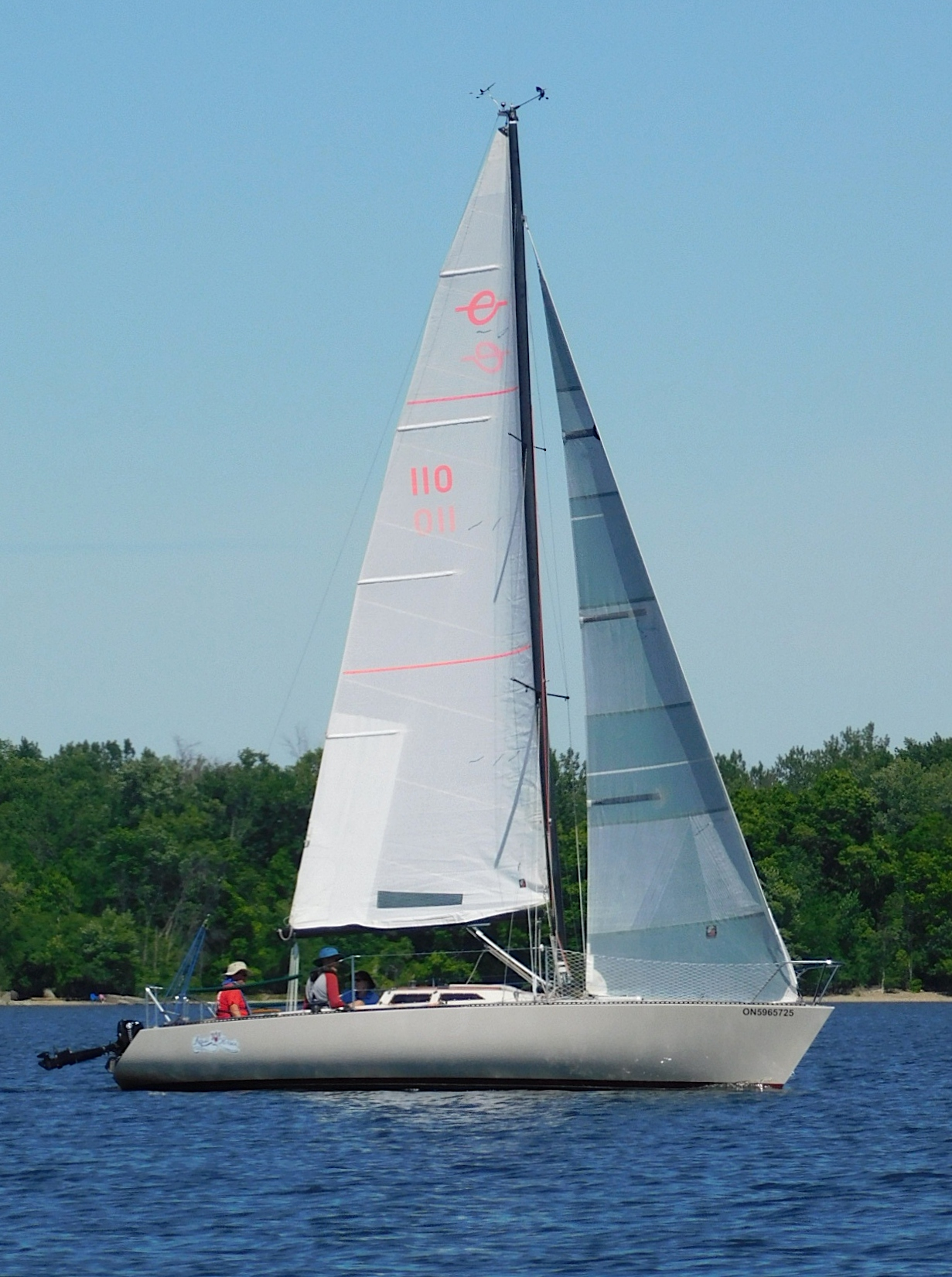
Express 27

The Express 27 is an ultralight displacement recreational keelboat, built predominantly of vacuum bag moulding vinylester, S-glass, E-glass, Klegecell foam and a balsa core, with wood trim. It has a fractional sloop or optional masthead sloop rig, a raked stem, a reverse transom, an internally mounted spade-type rudder controlled by a tiller and a fixed fin keel. It displaces 2,450 lb (1,111 kg) and carries 1,100 lb (499 kg) of ballast. Later versions had a stepped transom to make boarding easier.

The boat was actually designed around the cockpit jib winches. Designer Schumacher describes the concept in a 1985 interview in Latitude 38, working with builder Terry Alsberg on the design, "Terry and I started off with the idea of building a boat the same weight as a Moore 24, but two feet longer, but we eventually decided on the largest possible boat that could use a single speed (Barient 10) winch for the jib, which turned out to be 27 feet."

The hull design has a sharp bow, but also a forward flared shape, to prevent digging in while sailing downwind. The hull's V-shape is designed for planing. The large rudder increases stability while sailing on the plane.

The boat has a draft of 4.50 ft (1.37 m) with the standard keel fitted and is normally fitted with a small well-mounted outboard motor for docking and maneuvering.

Below decks there is no galley, just seats, a bow "V"-berth and two quarter berths aft, with a teak and holy cabin sole. The head is a portable type, located forward, "V"-berth. Ventilation is provided by a forward hatch, while the small cabin ports are fixed.

The cockpit has two single speed jib winches. There is a standard 12:1 boom vang, 16:1 adjustable backstay and 2:1 mainsheet traveler, plus a 4:1 mainsheet block.

The design has a PHRF racing average handicap of 129 to 130.

Practical Sailor magazine noted, "A hefty ballast/displacement ratio nearing 50%, a painstakingly lowered center of gravity, a judiciously sharp entry, and augmented form stability are among the things that helped Schumacher create a boat that sails well to windward. So, too, do her narrow footprint, reduced windage, easily-controlled sailplan, and modified V-sections aft (which aid sail-carrying without measurably increasing drag.) Those sections (inspired in part, Schumacher said, by Aussie 18 skiffs) also help the boat plane quickly and controllably."

== Operational history ==
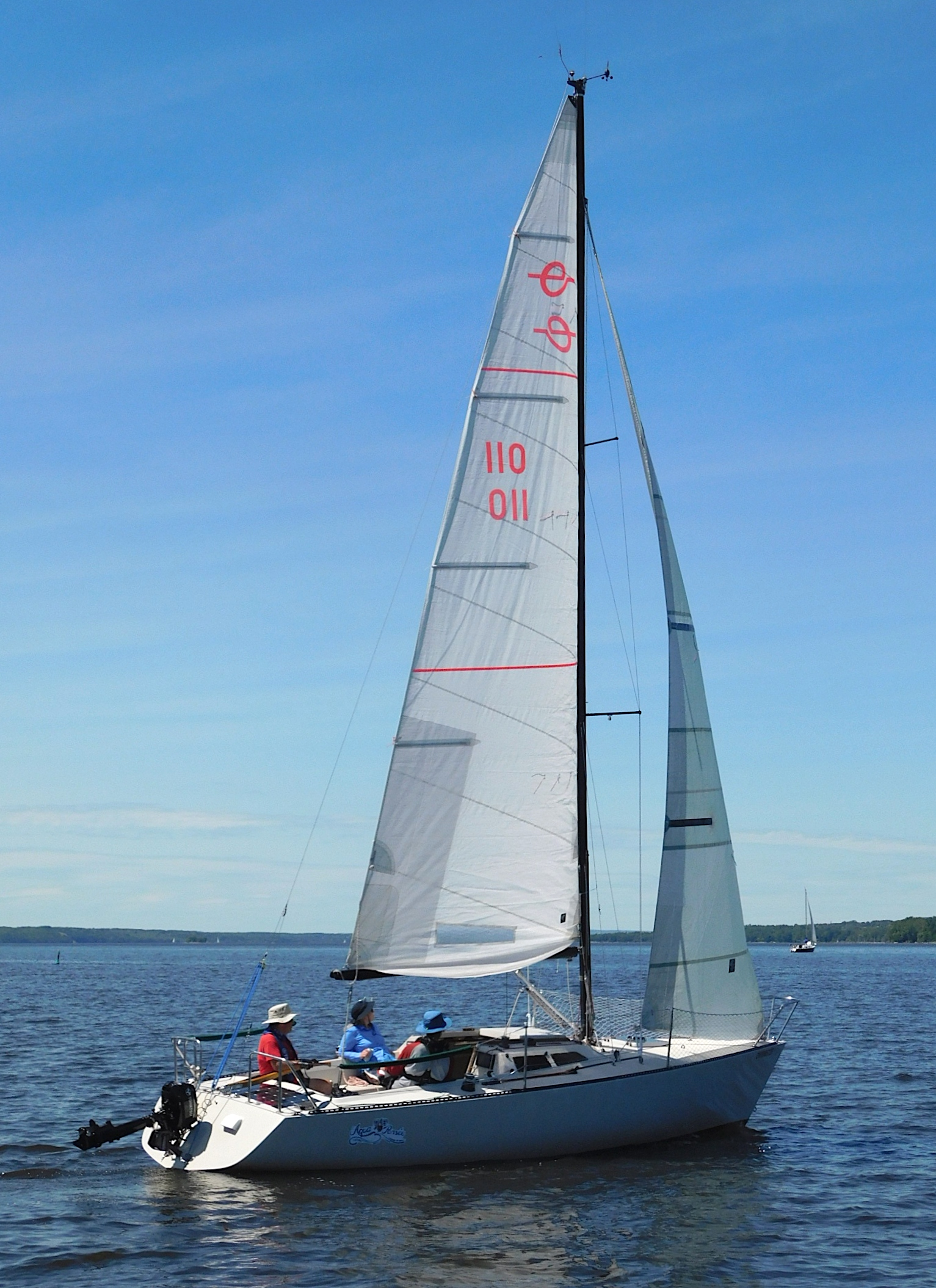
Express 27

By 2003 there were one-design fleets racing the Express 27 on San Francisco Bay, Detroit, and in Oregon. The boats were also being handicap raced in 12 additional US states and two Canadian provinces.

An owner of one of the boats stated, "It's hard to top the value. You can have great sailing for a season, plus a trailer and all the costs of campaigning, for what most guys in boats this size spend on a new spinnaker." Other owners said, "Hardly ever use motor." "Great sitting headroom." "After a dozen seasons of hard campaigning there's not a stress crack anywhere." "The rock stars say these boats are competitive no matter how old they are."

Practical Sailor wrote in a review in 2003, "The E-27 was ahead of her time. Many modern boats are built like her, and the heretical "light makes right" credo has become much closer to orthodoxy than it was in days of old. But take a look around at the one-designs that have come and gone since Alsberg sold his first 27-footer in 1982. Why have these 117 E-27s seen them come and seen them go? Materials and workmanship, certainly, but there's also the fact that Carl Schumacher didn't design spartan, crew-punishing boats, even if they were meant to be round-the-buoys or offshore one-design racers. He made accommodations that were actually sensible and comfortable, even in small boats, while never forgetting weight concerns."

== See also ==
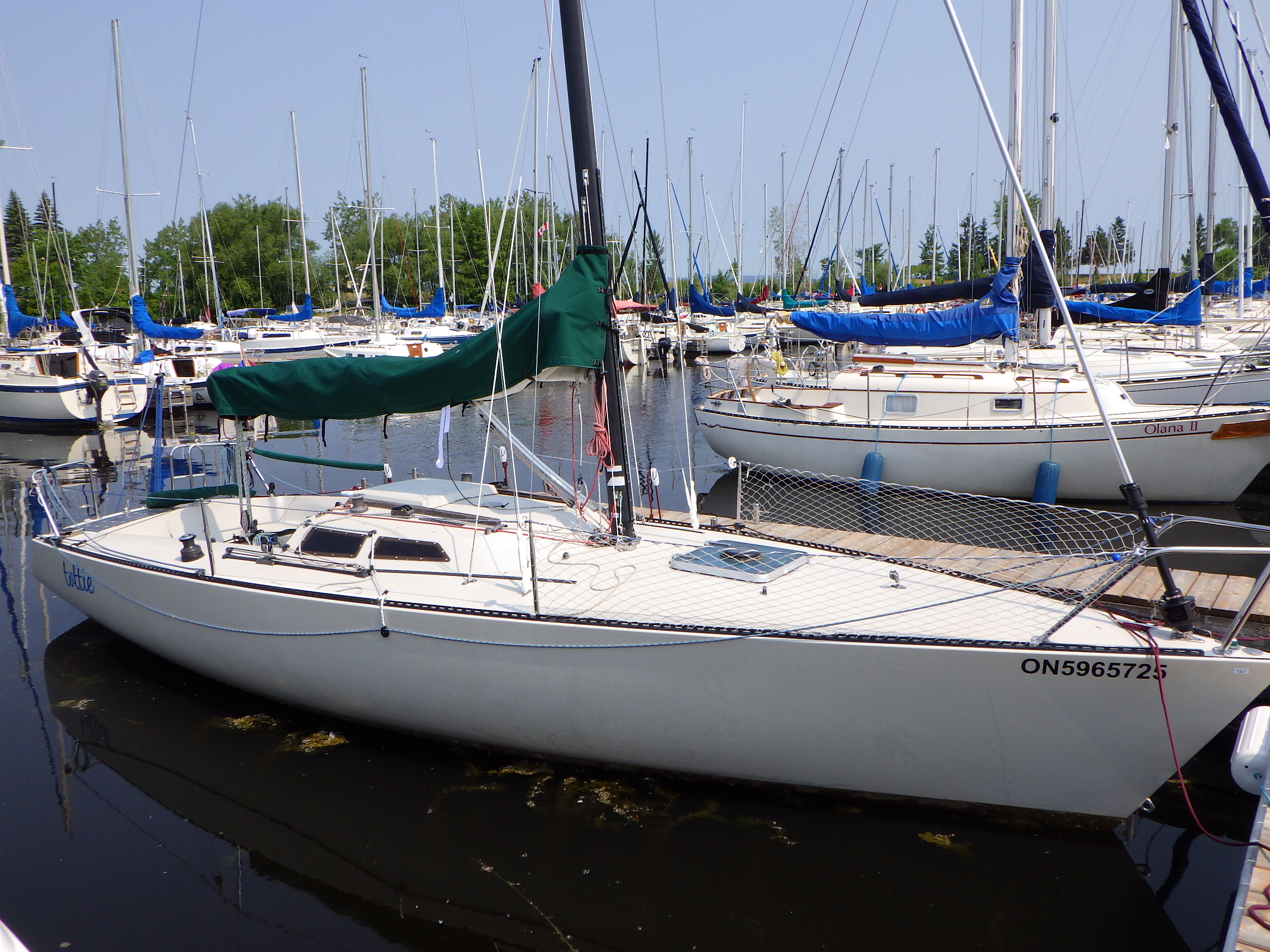
Express 27

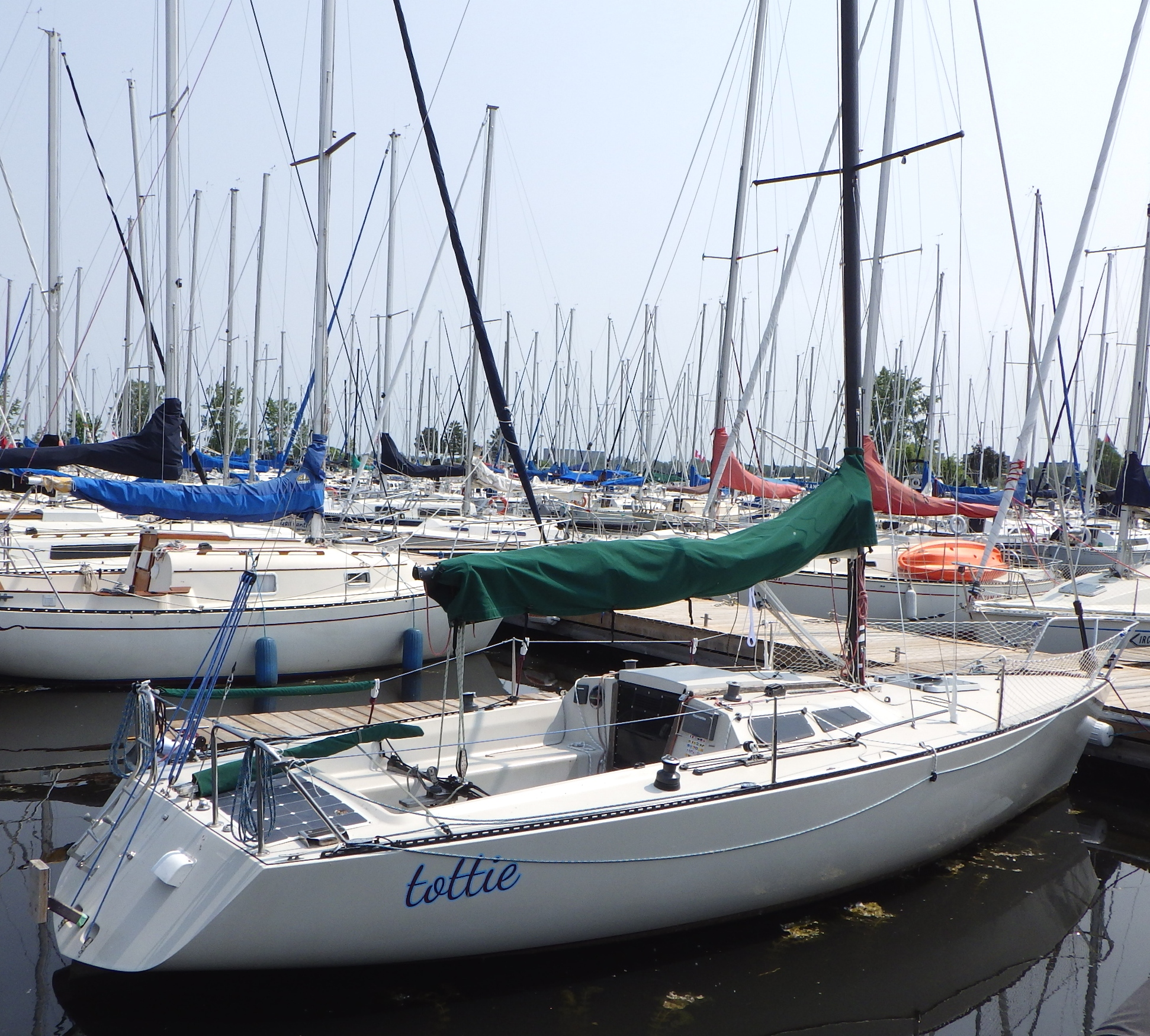
Express 27 showing reverse transom

- List of sailing boat types

Related development

- Express 34
- Express 37

Similar sailboats

- Aloha 27
- C&C 27
- C&C SR 27
- Cal 27
- Cal 2-27
- Cal 3-27
- Catalina 27
- Catalina 270
- Catalina 275 Sport
- Crown 28
- CS 27
- Edel 820
- Fantasia 27
- Halman Horizon
- Hotfoot 27
- Hullmaster 27
- Hunter 27
- Hunter 27-2
- Hunter 27-3
- Irwin 27
- Mirage 27 (Perry)
- Mirage 27 (Schmidt)
- O'Day 272
- Orion 27-2
- Tanzer 27
- Watkins 27
- Watkins 27P
