= Arana Gulch =

Coordinates: 37.029116°N 121.973572°W

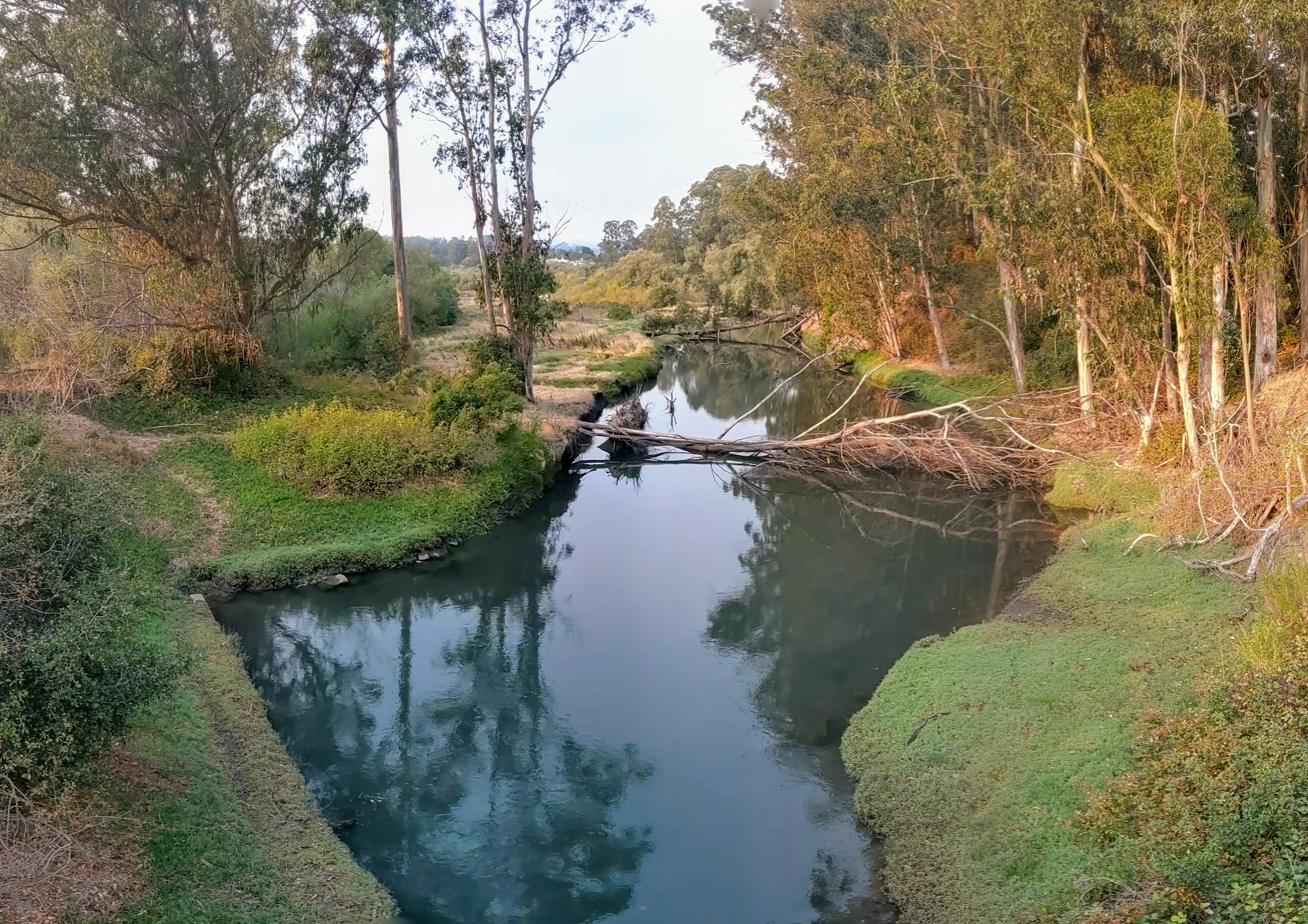
View of Arana Creek from Arana Gulch Bridge; the creek flows under the bridge and into the Santa Cruz Small Craft Harbor.

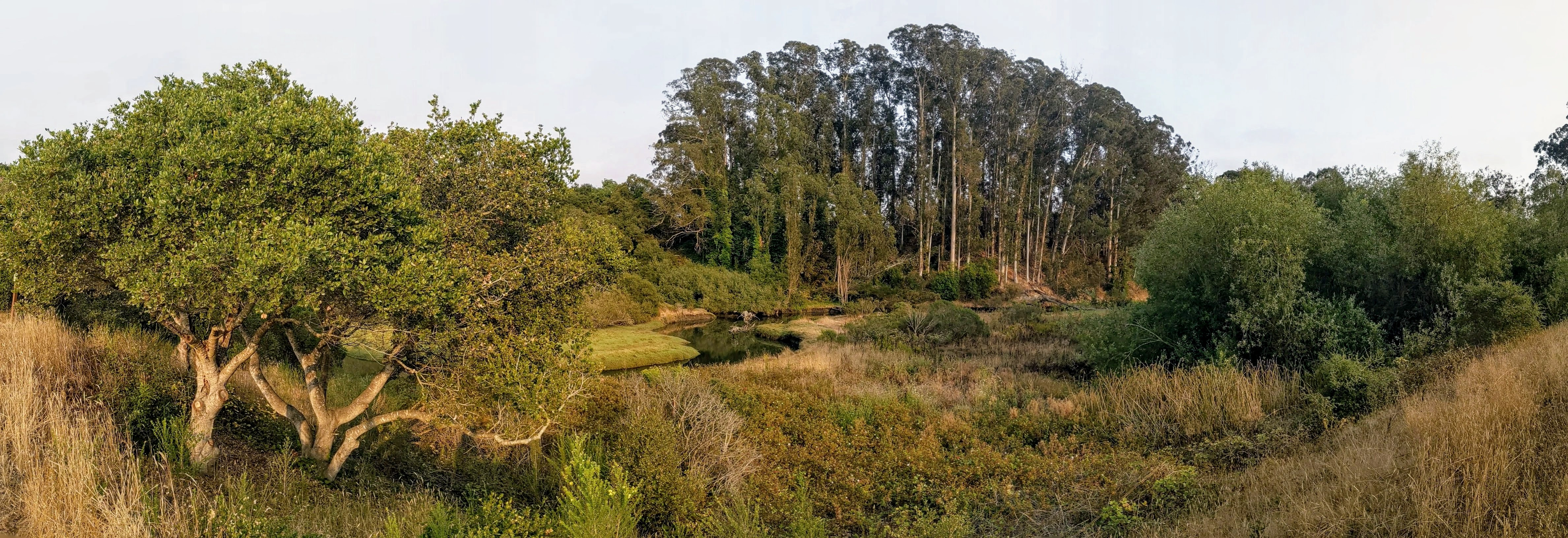
View of Arana Creek and its floodplain, also known as Arana Marsh, from the Arana Loop hiking trail

Arana Gulch is a creek and landform that forms part of the southeastern boundary of the city of Santa Cruz, California. The creek begins in the Santa Cruz Mountains and flows southwest into Monterey Bay via what was once called Woods Lagoon, now the Santa Cruz Small Craft Harbor.

== History ==
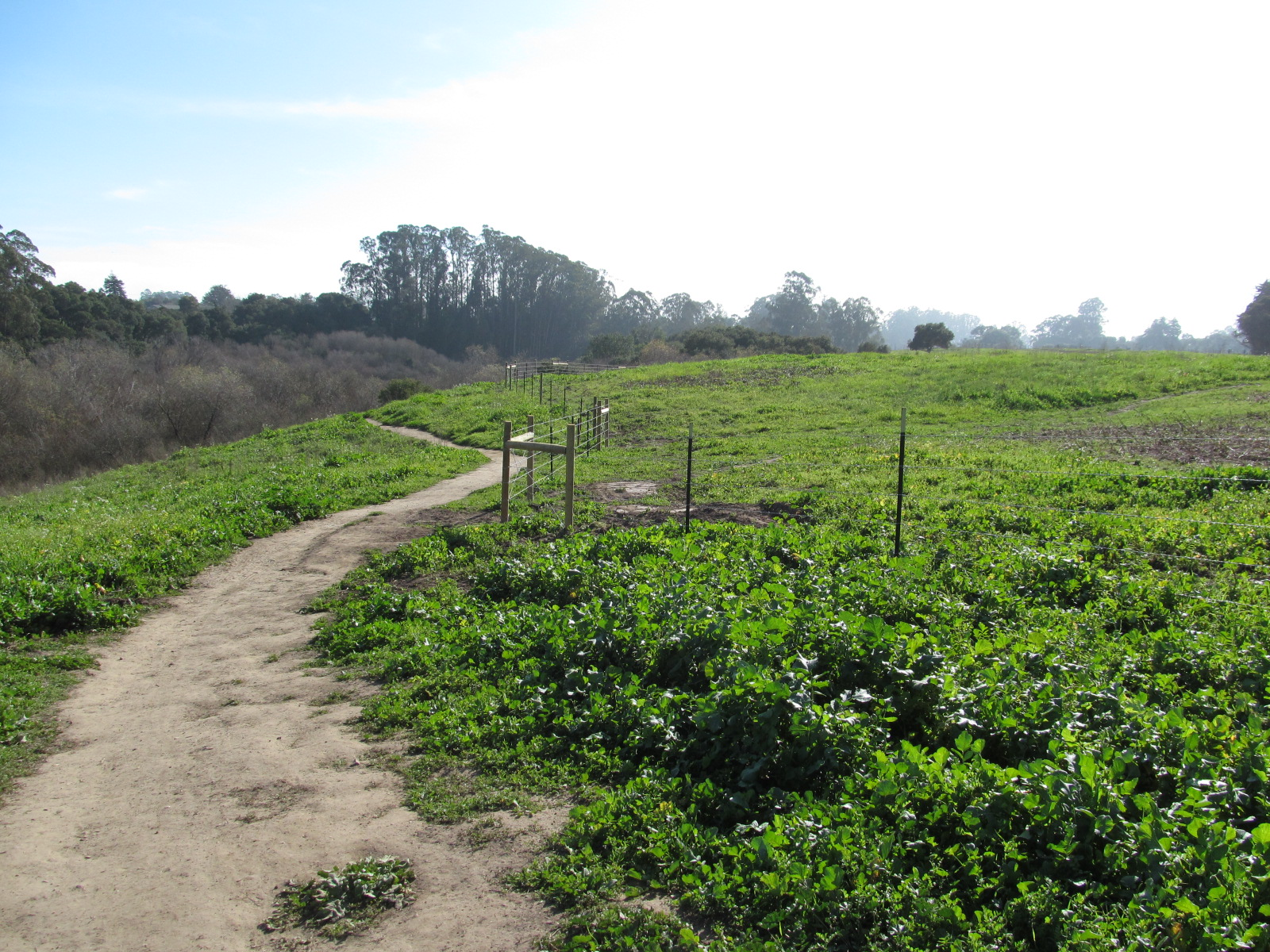
Hiking trail on Arana Gulch area

Arana Gulch is named after José Arana, who came to Alta California in 1834 with the Hijar-Padres colonization group. Arana was the grantee of the Rancho Potrero y Rincón de San Pedro Regalado (now the Potrero and Harvey West neighborhoods of northern Santa Cruz) in the year 1842. Sometime after that date, Arana moved to the area that now bears his name. Prior to California statehood, Arana Creek was the dividing line between lands assigned to the Villa de Branciforte (to the west) and those of Rancho Arroyo del Rodeo.

The Arana Gulch open space parcel is mostly the former Hagemann farm, also called Live Oak Ranch. Frederick Hagemann was an early immigrant to this area from Germany. The Hagemann house (older section dates from 1860s, later addition from 1885) still stands on a remainder parcel adjacent to the open space. Cattle once roamed the pasture and were housed in a large barn, which no longer remains.

In the 1920s, Arana Gulch housed East Side Dairy, which was owned by the Kinzli family.

== Arana Gulch open space ==
The City of Santa Cruz maintains this large parcel that lies mostly on the west side of Arana Gulch, adjacent to and upstream from the Santa Cruz harbor, and maintains Arana Gulch Open Space as a public open space. The Arana Gulch open space is part of the "greenbelt" established in 1979 to mostly surround the city. The Arana Creek watershed is a groundwater resource for Santa Cruz County.

The open space includes meadows (former farmland), California oak woodland, and the riparian zones along Arana Gulch and Hagemann Gulch. Trails for hikers and bicyclists access the park from the upper harbor parking lot off of Brommer Street and from Mentel Ave. and Agnes St. in Santa Cruz on the north side.

In January 2015, new, three-branched paved fully accessible pedestrian and bicycle trails were opened connecting Broadway in Santa Cruz east to Brommer Street in unincorporated Live Oak via a new bridges over Hagemann Gulch and Arana Creek, as well as a pathway connecting northward to Mentel Ave. in Santa Cruz. This connection between the City of Santa Cruz and the urbanized, unincorporated area of Live Oak was originally planned as a four-lane road – the "Broadway–Brommer connection".

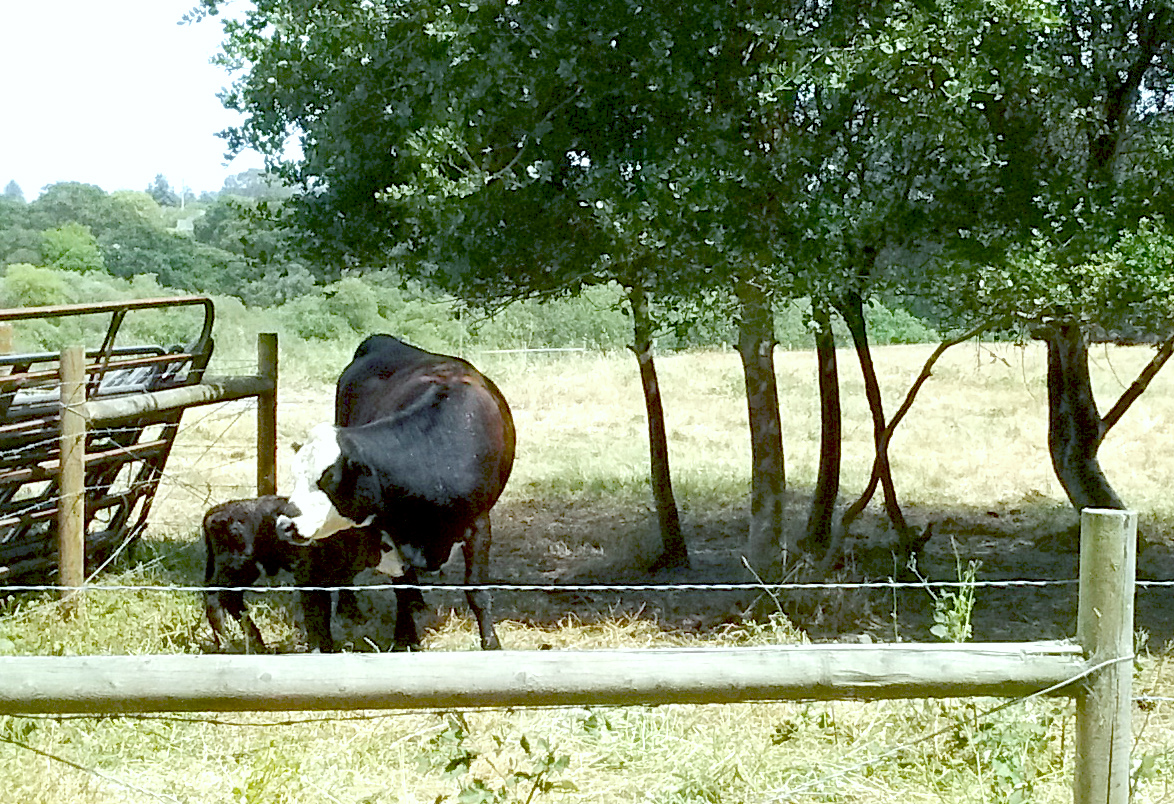
Newborn calf and mother 6/24/19

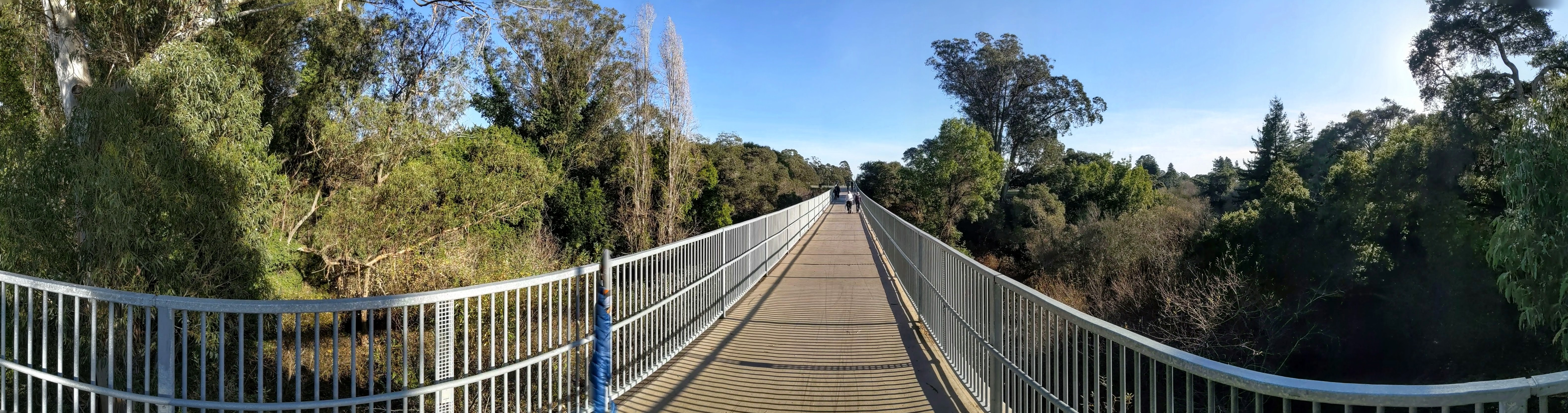
The Hagemann Gulch Bridge connects the Arana Gulch Trail to Broadway in Santa Cruz.

== Natural features ==
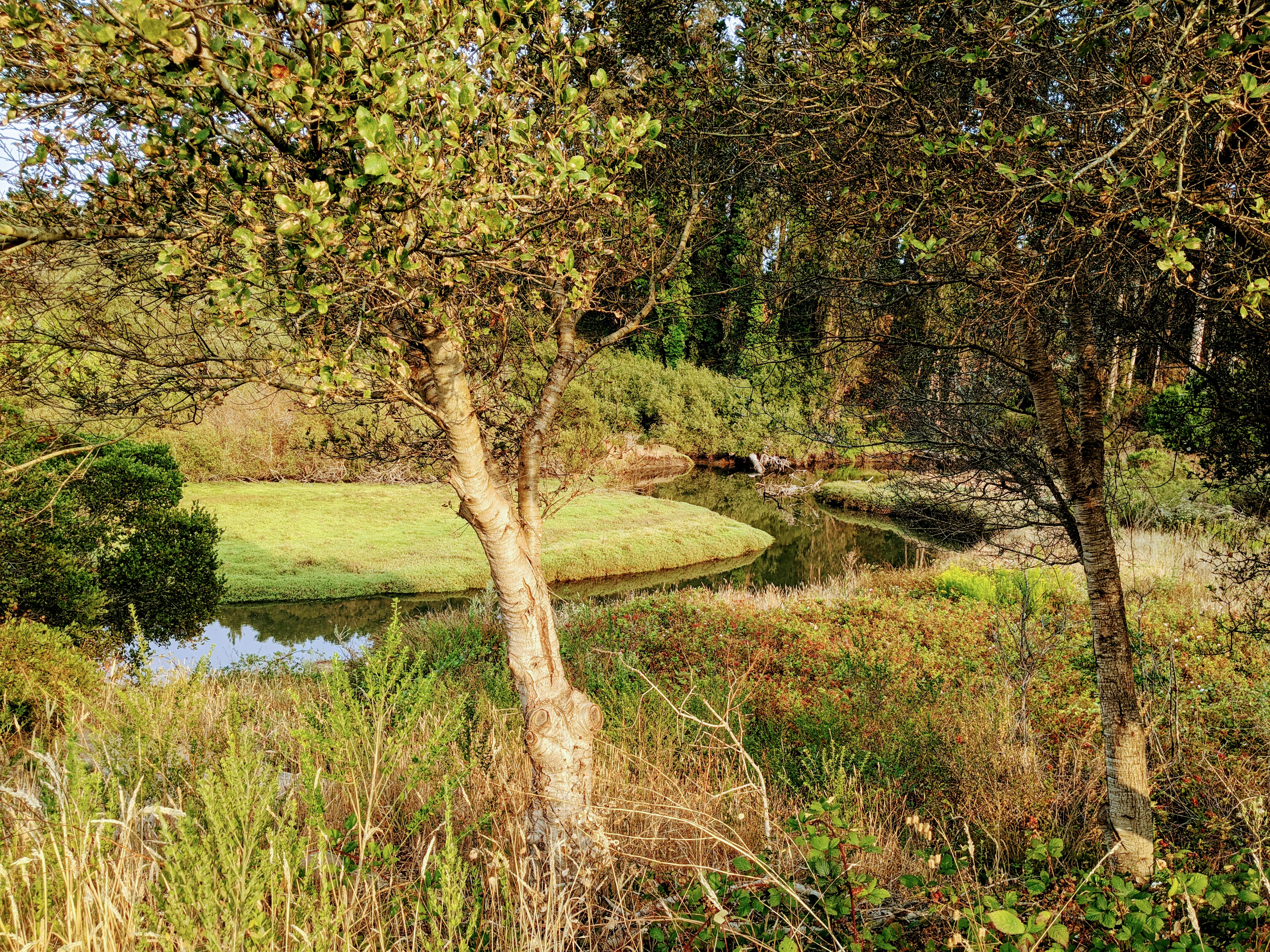
The swampy part of the gulch is also known as Arana March.

Arana Gulch supports a variety of vegetation and wildlife, including the endangered species Santa Cruz tarplant (Holocarpha macradenia). To support the migratory monarch butterfly population, native tarplant growth has increased via the return of black angus cows who serve as a disruptive resident as they stomp and eat the competing flora.

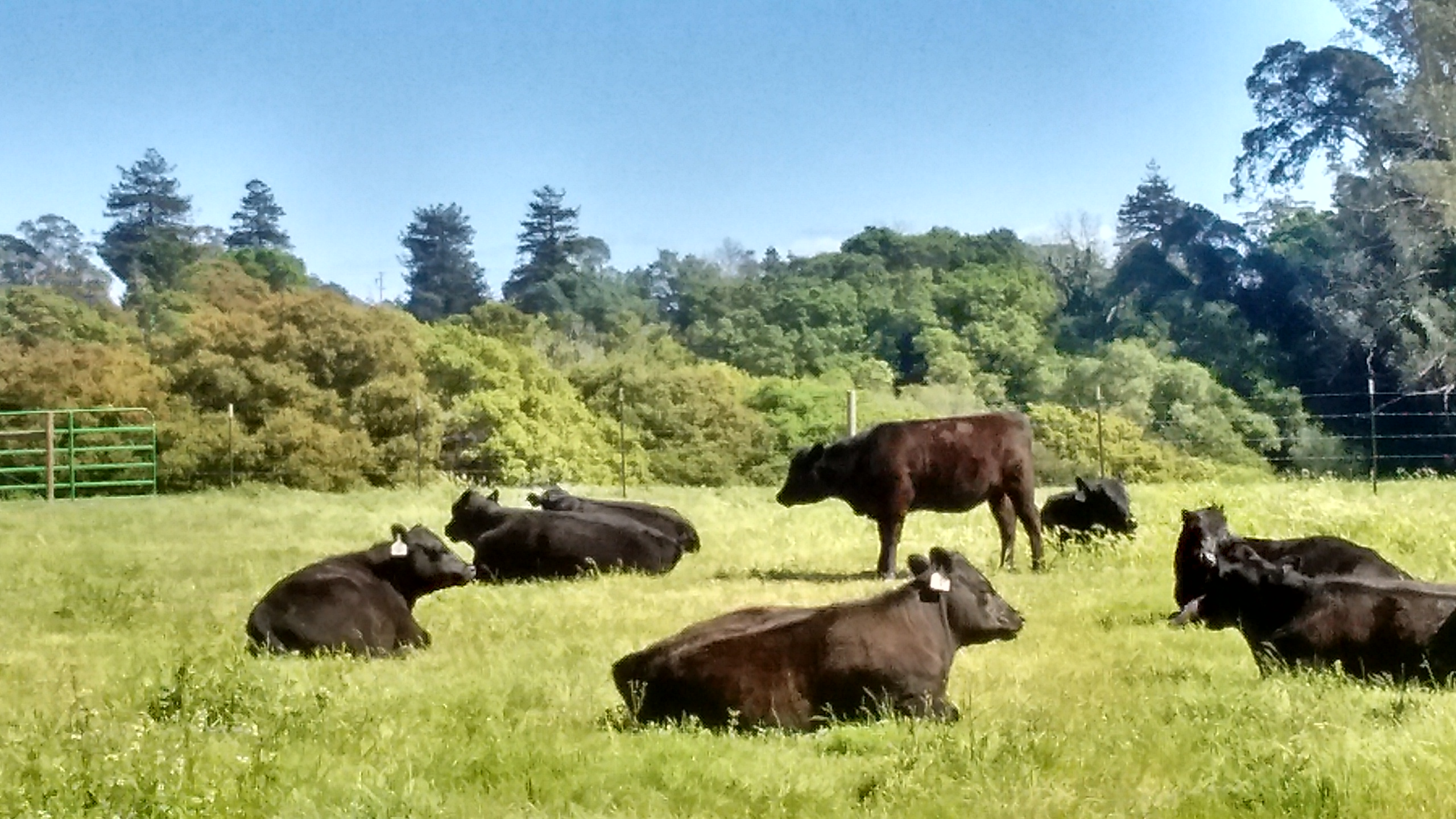
Arana Gulch Black Angus cows (2017)

It has been observed at least since 1990 that a ravine of Arana Gulch appeared to indicate headward erosion due to concentration of surface runoff. The lower reaches of Arana Gulch receive runoff from generally urbanized areas of Santa Cruz.

== Historic closures ==
Several of the now public paths were on private property in decades past, marked with no trespassing signage. Since becoming a public park, the space invites visitors of many species to traverse pathways and hideaways near the cattle grazing areas and adjacent wetlands. In recent times, three notable closures of the human walking trails have occurred, all arising as a response to enhance and maintain safety for the residents and community living nearby.

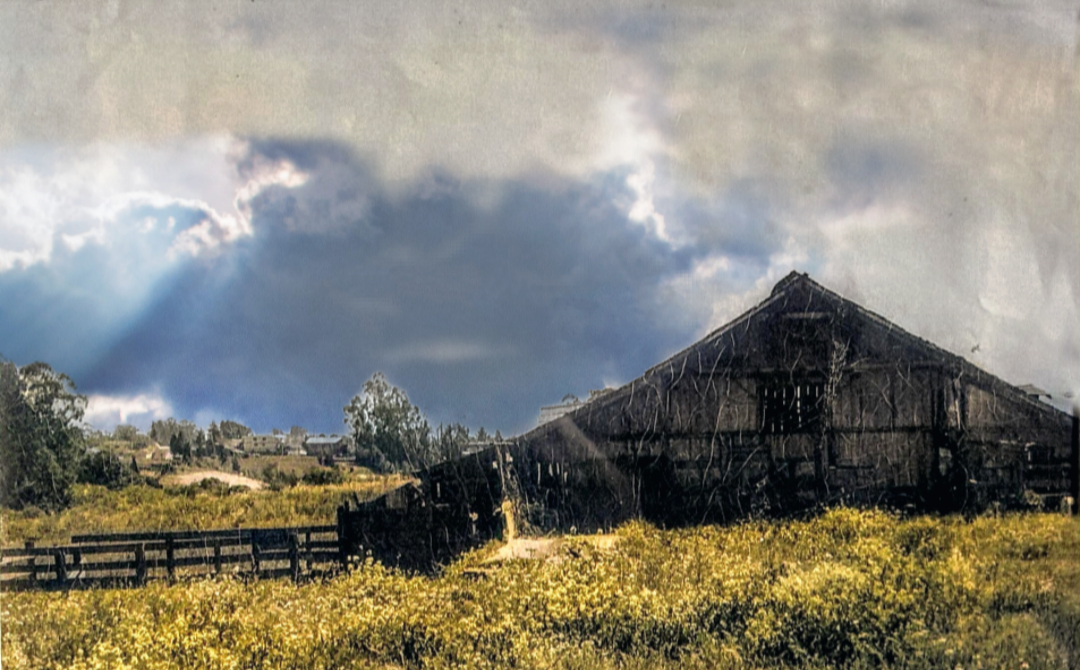
Arana Gulch barn for cattle

The first recent instance occurred in 2014 with the construction of the Arana Gulch Multi-Trail Project. The new porous trail material allows water to reach the soil below, enabling subterranean fauna to 'cross the road, and get to the other side' like any other above ground resident. This trail's construction took extra time and care to minimize the ecological impact of the native habitat, and partially closed the gulch for a number of months.

The next closure occurred in November 2018, in response to the northern California fires. The measure was considered to be preventative, as locals had reported to the city police that transients were camping and cooking in the adjacent forest and posed a danger to the residents of the gulch and neighboring households.

The most recent closure in April 2020 supported the state and local policy on social distancing and shelter in place measures resulting from the COVID-19 pandemic in California.
