= Olson 30 =

Sailboat designed by George Olson ca.1978

- Class symbol

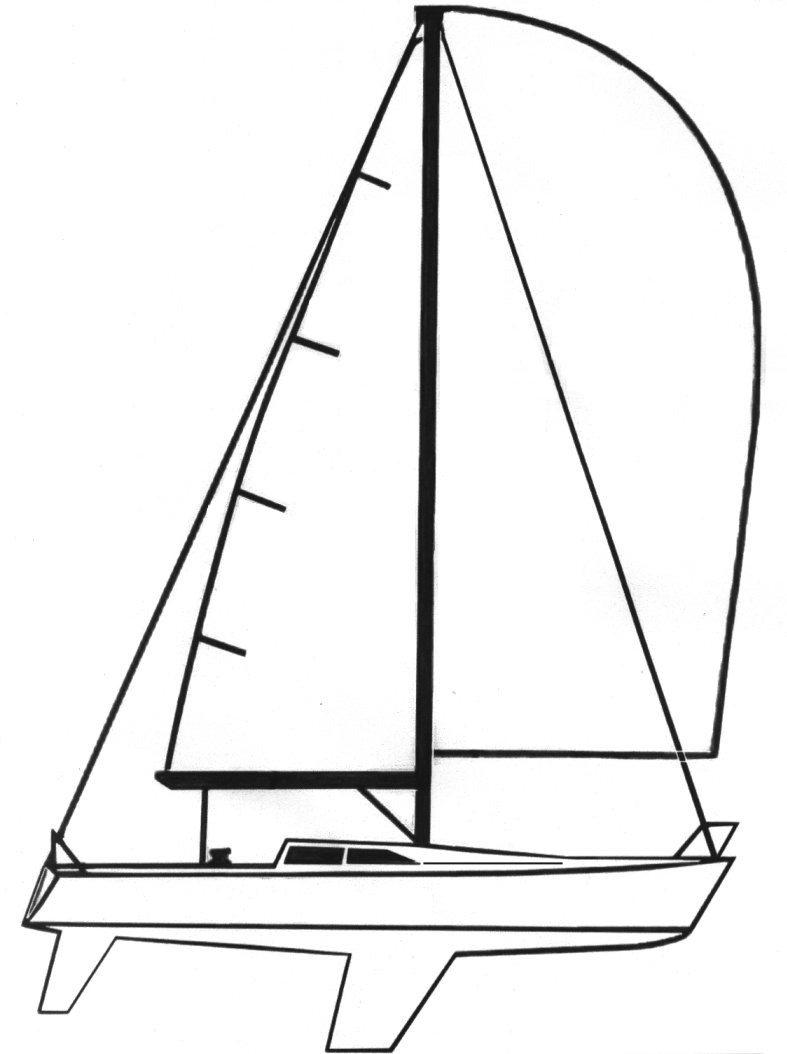
- Olson 30

Development
- Designer: George Olson
- Year: 1978

Boat
- Draft: 5 ft 1 in (1.55 m)

Hull
- Type: Monohull
- Hull weight: 3,600 lb (1,600 kg)
- LOA: 30 ft 0 in (9.14 m)
- LWL: 27 ft 6 in (8.38 m)
- Beam: 9 ft 3 in (2.82 m)

Hull appendages
- Keel: Fixed

Sails
- Spinnaker area: 761 sq ft (70.7 m^{2})
- Upwind sail area: 380 sq ft (35 m^{2})

Racing
- PHRF: 96–117

The Olson 30 is a sailboat designed by George Olson of Santa Cruz, CA around 1978. Olson was a surfer and surfboard shaper who decided to design a 30' ultra light displacement boat while on a delivery from Honolulu to Santa Cruz on Merlin, a 68' Bill Lee designed and built ultralight sailboat which had competed in the biennial Transpac race in 1977. During this delivery, Olson came up with the idea while sailing with Denis Bassano and Don Snyder, who lent their initials to the prototype's name, SOB 30. The resulting boat was christened Pacific High, and it was launched in 1978.

As a result of what Olson learned about the sailing characteristics of Pacific High, he constructed a plug for a production boat. The draft was reduced somewhat, the freeboard was increased, and the teak decks of the prototype were replaced with fiberglass and rolled-on non-skid. Olson and partners Lyn Neale and Alan Wirtanen started Pacific Boats in an industrial area of Live Oak, CA, an unincorporated area between Santa Cruz and Capitola.

The Olson 30 was introduced into a crowded market of ultralight boats constructed in the Santa Cruz area, including Ron Moore's Moore 24 and Bill Lee's Santa Cruz 27. The Olson 30 featured a single spreader masthead sloop rig with aluminum spars from either Sparcraft Spars or Ballenger Spars of Santa Cruz. Unlike the Moore 24 and Santa Cruz 27, the Olson 30 was relatively beamier and was not legally trailerable without a special permit in California (although it's unclear whether any of the owners actually sought out permits). Construction was similar to the other Santa Cruz boats with polyester resin, E-glass, and an end-grain balsa core in the hull and deck. The keel was cast lead with a small "stubby" of fiberglass, and the rudder was a fiberglass and foam sandwich with a pultruded fiberglass shaft. Unlike many of the boats built in Santa Cruz, the Olson 30 had a light spruce plywood interior, in contrast to the more common Bruynzeel plywood interiors of other boats.

Approximately 250 boats were built by Pacific Boats and Ericson Yachts. You can find out more about specific boats by researching the Olson 30 Hull Number Database.

== Racing History ==
The Olson 30 originally raced as a MORC (Midget Ocean Racing Class) handicapped competitor. MORC is no longer a viable class and Olson 30's now compete in PHRF (Performance Handicap Rating Fleet) and One Design competitions. PHRF ratings are typically between 998 and 999 depending on location, IRC rating is between 0.967 and 0.983. As a demonstration of the boat's seaworthiness, various Olson 30s have sailed in races from Southern California to Mexico, across the Atlantic, and numerous trips from California to France In 1980, 1982, and 1984, Olson 30s competed in the Singlehanded Transpac, a biennial race from San Francisco to Hanalei Bay, Kauai, Hawaii. A combination of their relative low cost, speed, and strength has made them a favorite of singlehanded racers on the Pacific Coast.

For nearly 35 years, the Ultra Light Displacement Boat (ULDB) boats have clashed in measured and friendly rivalries, none more noted than that of the Olson 30 versus the Hobie 33. Regardless of the rest of the racing fleet, if there is an Olson and a Hobie on the line, more often than not, the result of the race does not matter, so long as one beats the other. The Hobie 33, with her huge sail plan and bulbed keel maintain the general performance advantage over the Olson; however, that does not keep the rivalry from raging, and, even as recently as January, 2018, an Olson beat a Hobie in a drag race from Lauderdale to Key West. In 2018 an Olson also beat a Hobie in the Encinal Jack Frost winter series in the San Francisco Bay.

On the East Coast, an Olson 30 has appeared at least twice in the biennial Bermuda 1-2 race as recently as 2017 (S/V Concussion Hull#202). Most recently, an Olson 30 (again, S/V Concussion Hull#202) competed in the annual winter Southern Ocean Racing Conference Islands in the Stream series which begins with a race from Miami to Nassau, and ends with a race from Miami to Havana.

== Racing Organizations ==
The Olson 30 National Class Association presides over the set of rules that regulate racing an Olson 30 as a One Design class, and it provides support for a yearly National Championship regatta. Past Nationals have been held most commonly in Long Beach, CA, San Francisco CA, Lake Tahoe, CA, or Seattle, WA, but have been held in other locales from time-to-time. In addition to the national class association, several regional class associations exist where the boat is popular enough to support a regular one-design fleet. There are established fleets in the Pacific Northwest, San Francisco, and Los Angeles areas, as well as representation on the Great Lakes, on the United States East Coast, Hawaii, and in the Caribbean.

Where boats do not race in One Design starts, the boat competes using the well-known PHRF handicapping system, and more recently in some cases in IRC (sailing). Using these handicapping systems, the Olson 30 is commonly pitted against other well-known racing designs such as the Melges 24, Soverel 33, and J/29.

== General Sailing Performance ==
Because the Olson 30 is so light for its length and has a relatively overpowered (for its design's age) sail profile, the Olson 30 excels at light-air sailing. In moderate conditions the sailing performance is unremarkable. In heavy conditions upwind the Olson 30 suffers from the lack of weight to drive the bow and the boat through waves, however downwind in a breeze the Olson 30 surfs and planes readily, and it was for these conditions the boat was ultimately designed. The stock rudder tends to be underpowered in heavy air, leading to difficult driving downwind especially in short waves and big wind.

== Modifications ==
As a recreational sailboat the Olson 30 has been resilient over time. One can still find non-racing Olson 30 sailboats actively sailing today in the same configuration as they were shipped in from the factory more than 30 years ago.

However, as a One Design sailboat racing class, the Olson 30 has always been an experimental class. It lacks the extremely rigid One Design class rules that limit sail purchases, sail and boat materials, and some types of modifications. As a result, many racing Olson 30s, in an effort to tweak performance and increase the longevity of an already very resilient boat, have had minor-to-extensive work done to maximize the performance of the boat within the class rules.

Many boats have been upgraded to a Ballenger double-spreader rig, frequently using the original spar and a retrofit kit that includes new shrouds and two pairs of spreaders. This stabilizes the otherwise flexible rig. Several Seattle owners, who owned boats with Ballenger or Sparcraft single-spreader masts, pioneered a technique to move the single-spreader rig's existing capshroud terminals to the very top of the mast by elongating the spreaders and cutting longer capshrouds.

Due to some challenges of steering the boat downwind in a blow, some boats were fitted with elliptical rudders to improve handling. These rudders were typically fabricated by Moore. A newer non-class, deeper elliptical foil by Foss Foils in Newport, California was created for pure offshore ocean racing which garnered measurable stability on S/V Kato in the 2016 Single Handed Transpac (winner), and on S/V Concussion with her 2nd-place finish in Lauderdale to Key West. The Foss Foil has more wetted surface area and weighs over twice as much as the original foil, which tends to cancel out any penalty by ratings review.

While One Design racing class rules specifically prohibit reinforcing the hull with longitudinal stringers or added bulkheads, many other kinds of modifications exist to increase hull rigidity. These can include a rigid beam between the chainplates, rod rigging run from under the base of the keel-stepped mast to the chainplates, and so on. Recently the class rules were amended to allow some very limited reinforcement of the area between the forward bulkhead and cabinets.

A few boats had inboards installed, although this is uncommon.
