= Santa Cruz Breakwater Light =

Lighthouse in California, United States

Santa Cruz West Breakwater Light Walton Lighthouse
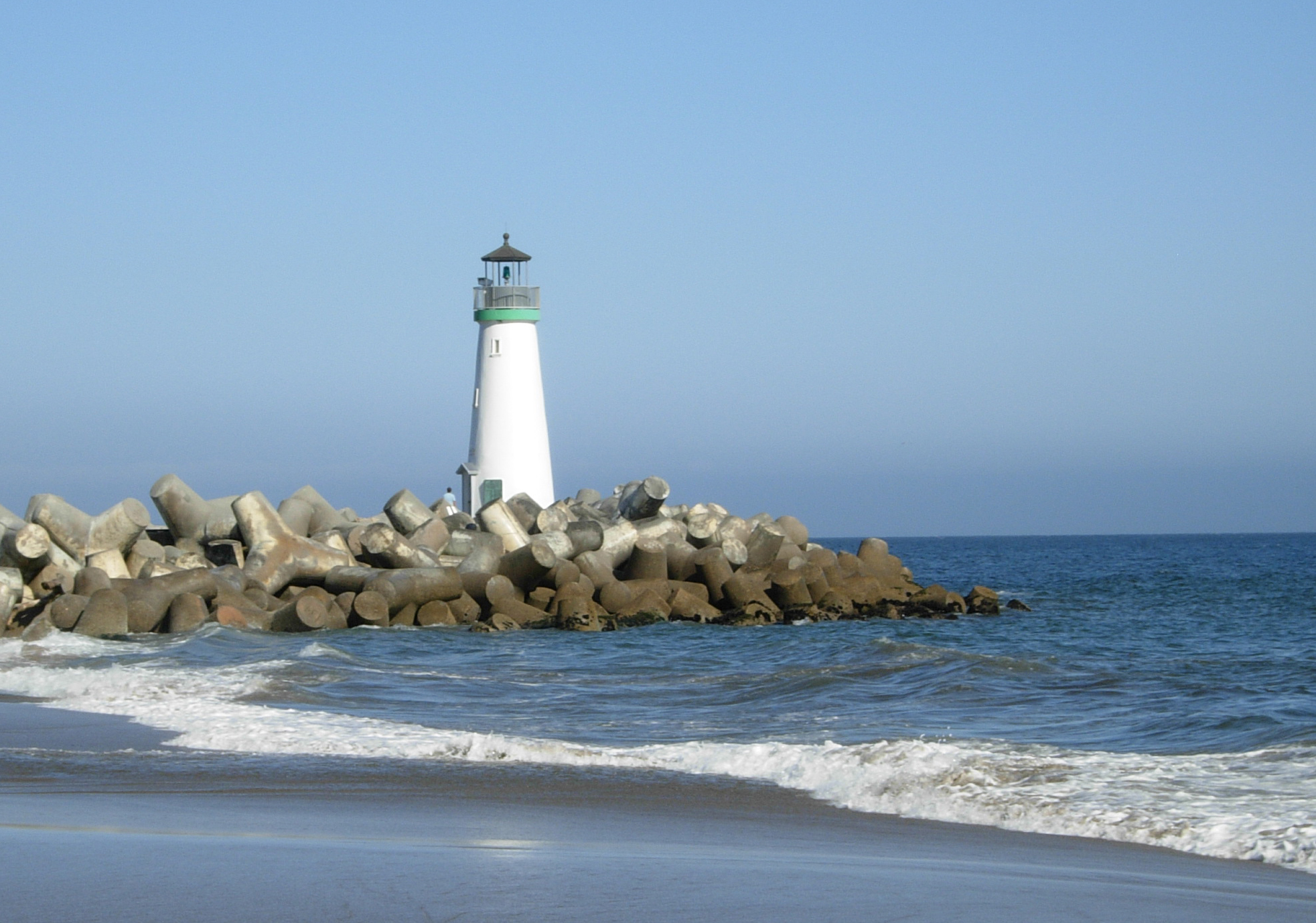
- Location: Santa Cruz Small Craft Harbor; California; United States
- Coordinates: 36°57′38.5″N 122°00′08.0″W

Tower
- Constructed: 1964 (first)
- Construction: reinforced concrete tower
- Height: 41.5 feet (12.6 m)
- Shape: tapered cylindrical tower with balcony and lantern
- Markings: white tower with upper narrow green band
- Operator: United States Coast Guard
- Fog signal: 1 blast every 30s.

Light
- First lit: 2001 (current)
- Focal height: 59.5 feet (18.1 m)
- Range: 8 nautical miles (15 km; 9.2 mi)
- Characteristic: Oc G 4s.

Santa Cruz Breakwater Lighthouse, is a lighthouse in California, United States, in the Santa Cruz Small Craft Harbor in Santa Cruz, California.

The lighthouse is known as Walton Lighthouse because Charles Walton, a local businessman, contributed a significant part of the construction cost in memory of his late brother Derek Walton, who was a merchant seaman. The Walton lighthouse was built in 2001 with donations including $60,000 from Charles Walton.

The Santa Cruz Breakwater Lighthouse is not to be confused with the Santa Cruz Light about 1.5 miles (2.4 km) to the west above Steamer Lane.

== See also ==
- List of lighthouses in the United States
