= Ultra light displacement boat =

Sailboat type

An Ultra Light Displacement Boat (or ULDB) is a term used to refer to a modern form of sailboat watercraft with limited displacement relative to the hull size (waterline length). Principally manufactured from the mid 1970s through mid 1980s, these boats generally sit higher in the water allowing them to move faster in nearly all water types other than directly crashing into larger waves, upwind, where the momentum of the water slows the boat down due to their lighter weights. They are typically racer-cruiser and/or "trailer sailer" boats that are excellent for towing, due to their light weight. They typically have cabins, but are designed for racing, excellent low-wind characteristics, large sail plans, and to have decent weight of crew-members to control heeling of the boat under medium winds, and higher. While some have keel-stepped masts and are raced in oceans, ocean bays, or offshore, such as the Olson 30, most have deck-stepped masts and are typically more common inland and in lakes or limited or protected ocean environments due to the construction design of these boats, and to provide some level of comfort to the crew.

The possibility of further speed increase [...] will always attract ardent believers in their speed virtues, just as they have done in the past. The ULDB are, however, very capricious creatures in terms of performance. They may deliver the goods, provided there is just a right kind of wind and from the right direction to sail 'full and by'. And since weather is also capricious, the ULDB and weather seldom suit each other. 'Light displacement craft', Davidson remarked, 'are not new in principle'. For many centuries there have been canoes, proas and the like in the South Pacific and other places, with similar displacement in proportion to the sail area and hull length. Racing dinghies, or dinghy-like modern offshore racers, so common today, are typical examples of the same principle. In all instances the combination of the major design features: displacement, sail area, length and stability [i.e. —] power to carry sails effectively, is radically different from the combination found in the traditional seaworthy and wholesome yachts.

— C. A. Marchaj, Sail Performance (1996)

ULDBs are competitive, even after 35 years with open ocean racing participation and podium finishes even today. The relative low cost to obtain, tough construction and readily easy modifications make an Olson or a Hobie an extremely competitive and fun boat. The boats do lack comfort, and are not designed for cruising; however, with multiple transpac races, and multiple Bermuda 1-2 entries, they are proving to be a stalwart competitor despite their older design.

== Partial List of ULDBs ==
The list of ULDBs manufactured is extensive. Here is a partial list, so far:

- Olson 30
- Hobie 33
- San Juan 23
- Schock Santana 23
- Schock Wavelength 24
- Merit 25
- Catalina Capri 25
- Moore 24
- Express 27
- Santa Cruz 27
- Wylie Wabbit 24
- Catalina Capri 30
- Futura 33

== See also ==
- Bill Lee (yacht designer)
- George Olson (yacht designer)
- International Offshore Rule
- Ron Moore (boat builder)
- Sportsboat
