= Santa Cruz Yacht Club =

Californian yacht club

Coordinates: 36°57.965′N 122°00.200′W

Santa Cruz Yacht Club, Inc.
- Burgee
- Short name: SCYC
- Founded: January 5, 1928
- Location: 244 4th Avenue, Santa Cruz, CA 95062
- Commodore: De Schuyler – 2026
- Website: SCYC.org

The Santa Cruz Yacht Club (SCYC) is a yacht club founded in 1928 and is the oldest, and currently the only, yacht club in Santa Cruz, California.

== History ==
=== Pre-Yacht Club Years ===
In 1925, two local bankers, Bruce Sharpe and Charlie Towne, purchased a 14-foot cat boat and began sailing it on Monterey Bay out of Santa Cruz, California. Their sailing enthusiasm was noticed and they were soon joined by local merchant Sam Leask Jr. after which they joined the nearest yacht club, the San Francisco Yacht Club, which was located at Sausalito Cove. Soon after they joined, the overcrowded conditions in the cove led to a movement to relocate the clubhouse. The membership, however, was deeply divided as to whether to move the club to Belvedere Cove or to a site on the San Francisco waterfront. A majority favored the Marin site and the clubhouse was relocated. The remainder of the members split from the club and formed the St. Francis Yacht Club on the Marina. The trio from Santa Cruz had friends on both sides of the schism and rather than choose sides, Sharpe put forth the idea of starting a yacht club closer to home.

Sharp, Towne and Leask invited a dozen or so friends to join them for dinner in a balcony room at the Saddle Rock Grill and a lively discussion took place about the possibility of forming a local yacht club. By the time "last call" was sounded, all those present agreed to become members, thus establishing the Santa Cruz Yacht Club. It was January 5, 1928.

=== Early Yacht Club years ===
The infant club did not immediately spark a storm of sailing activity. As Leask recalled: "...At the outset, the members' knowledge of things nautical was decidedly limited. It was the era of prohibition and in order to hold the membership together we resorted to frequent expeditions to nearby bootleg establishments for meetings which were hilarious and convivial if not particularly yachting oriented."

The SCYC kept up its San Francisco connections, sponsoring long-distance races with both the San Francisco Yacht Club and the St. Francis Yacht Club. One of the first races that the Santa Cruz Yacht Club sponsored was a power boat race from Long Beach to San Francisco.

The San Francisco boating fraternity welcomed the presence of SCYC members on their top-flight yachts which were crewed by competent and well-disciplined sailors.

Sharp was elected the first Commodore, Jay Harris, who designed the club burgee, the second, and Leask the third. Those who were present at the time agree that the first truly accomplished seaman to join the club was Lino Nicoli who owned the 42-foot yawl "Pathfinder." It was Nicoli who first introduced many of the early members to the fine art of seamanship.

The club purchased a pair of 18-foot cub class sloops, the original "Jack" and "Jill" which were moored in the lee of the wharf. The two sloops served the membership well, but the "Jack" was lost on the beach in an early winter storm in 1942.

Initially, club meetings were held in the Casino Building courtesy of the Seaside Co. In 1930, a gear room and clubhouse was established on the wharf. It was 6 feet by 12 feet and contained two lockers, a table, and a bench. The head was a hole in the floor.

=== Wharf years ===
The SCYC was active in hosting several long-distance races down from San Francisco Bay, including the still popular Windjammers Race (1938). Held on Memorial Day weekend and later on Labor Day, the Windjammers event blossomed into the premier local sailing event.

Dozens of the Bay Area's finest yachts stood at anchor off the wharf following their run down the coast. Cries of "Shore boat!" echoed across the moorings, bringing Sea Scouts scurrying about dropping off Sunday papers and ice and ferrying sailors to and from shore. SCYC members prepared breakfast for the racers, providing sustenance for the long weekend's activities.

The large regattas were suspended for the duration of World War II but most of the club's yachts remained active.

By the mid-1950s, the clubhouse boasted amenities such as a real head and a shower. There was a bar and couches and even a balcony ideally suited for firing the cannon at the start of a race or sipping a four-bit cocktail and watching the sunset over Mark Abbott Memorial Lighthouse, commonly known as Lighthouse Point.

=== Santa Cruz Yacht Harbor years ===
In 1962, after decades of planning, the Army Corps of Engineers began the construction on the Santa Cruz Yacht Harbor at Wood's Lagoon, beginning first with, what is today known as, the South Harbor. The South Harbor was completed in 1964, and an initial 360 slips were dedicated.

In 1950, an election officially formed the Santa Cruz Port District under the guidelines of the State of California Harbors and Navigation Code and soon after the Santa Cruz Yacht Club began a search for property for a clubhouse near the soon-to-be Yacht Harbor. The present 4th Avenue clubhouse was purchased with a down payment put up by a group of members and was rented out until the harbor officially opened in 1964.

The membership quickly went to work on the new clubhouse, first building a deck and the steps that lead down to the harbor. However, soon after the initial construction was being completed, a major earthquake in Alaska generated a tsunami that damaged many of the docks. A short time later, the first of several anchovy kills turned the harbor into a reeking, paint-peeling muck. A thick layer of dead baitfish filled the channels, ruining brightwork and causing a stench that lasted months. These anchovy runs into the Yacht Harbor occur regularly and the Santa Cruz takes steps to mitigate deoxygenation and mass die-off through mechanical aeration machines located at the end of several of the docks throughout the harbor.

The 1970s saw Santa Cruz and the yacht club come to the forefront of the Ultra Light Displacement Boat (ULDB) movement that revolutionized yacht racing. In 1977 Bill Lee's "Merlin" shattered the Trans Pacific Race record and Santa Cruz ULDBs of all sizes became the boats to beat. Merlin's record stood for 20 years.

That same year, the clubhouse underwent a major expansion and remodel. Ten years later an interior remodel was completed and in 2012 the clubhouse went through a complete remodel, including the addition of a Tram, assuming its present configuration. In 2013, the SCYC hosted the official ribbon cutting for the clubhouse tram and lower level remodel.

== Club Identification ==
=== Club Burgee ===
The signal flag of the Club shall be a pointed burgee, divided vertically by a swallowtail with the hoist white and the fly red; superimposed shall be a blue circle containing a cruciform cross of white at an angle of 45 degrees toward the hoist. The blue circle shall have a diameter of one-half the length of the hoist and the center thereof shall be placed at the point of the swallowtail nearest the hoist. The flag shall be made an inch in length for each foot overall lot the yacht flying this flag.

== Sailing Programs ==
=== Junior Program ===
The Santa Cruz Yacht Club provides Junior membership eligibility to individuals between the ages of 8 and 21 years old. The Santa Cruz Yacht Club Junior program serves as a starting point for sailing for many youths in Santa Cruz County, as well as many surrounding counties and encourages youth sailing by providing Sailing instruction with emphasis on safety and seamanship, racing, day sailing, and cruising opportunities, and a learning environment that fosters courtesy, good sportsmanship, and community service. Coached practices are held just outside the Santa Cruz Yacht Harbor in the Monterey Bay.

The Santa Cruz Yacht Club Junior Program hosts three discrete programs for sailors:

==== Small Boat program ====
The Small Boat program is for sailors 8–14 Years of Age. These young sailors are taught fundamentals of proper boat handling, rigging, sailing in different conditions, racing, and tactics in Optimists.

==== Scholastic ====
The Scholastic program is for high school sailors who wish to train and race FJs competing with other schools in the region.

==== Advanced ====
The Advanced program is for high school sailors who compete independently in other venues such as C420s, Lasers and 29ers throughout the Bay Area and around the world.

=== Corinthian Program ===
The Santa Cruz Yacht Club provides Corinthian membership eligibility to individuals between the ages of twenty-one and thirty-six and who actively crew on boats of Regular members of the club or skipper their own boats under the burgee of the Santa Cruz Yacht Club. Corinthian members enjoy the same privileges as Regular Members except that they may not vote on affairs of the club which are subject to meetings of the club, or serve as an officer or director. The Corinthian Program provides a bridge between the Junior and Regular membership and helps to encourage active participation in the club by young adults. The Corinthian Program provides venues for sailing education and training for new and experienced sailors, including Sailing instruction for beginning, intermediate and advanced sailors in dinghies, keelboats and powerboats as well as a formal mentorship program which connects sailors with common interests.

== Fleets ==
The Santa Cruz hosts several one design fleets.

- El Toro
- Laser
- Multihulls (including Hobie & A-Cat designs)
- Catalina
- Santa Cruz 27
- Moore 24
- Santana 22

== Events of Note ==
=== Regattas ===
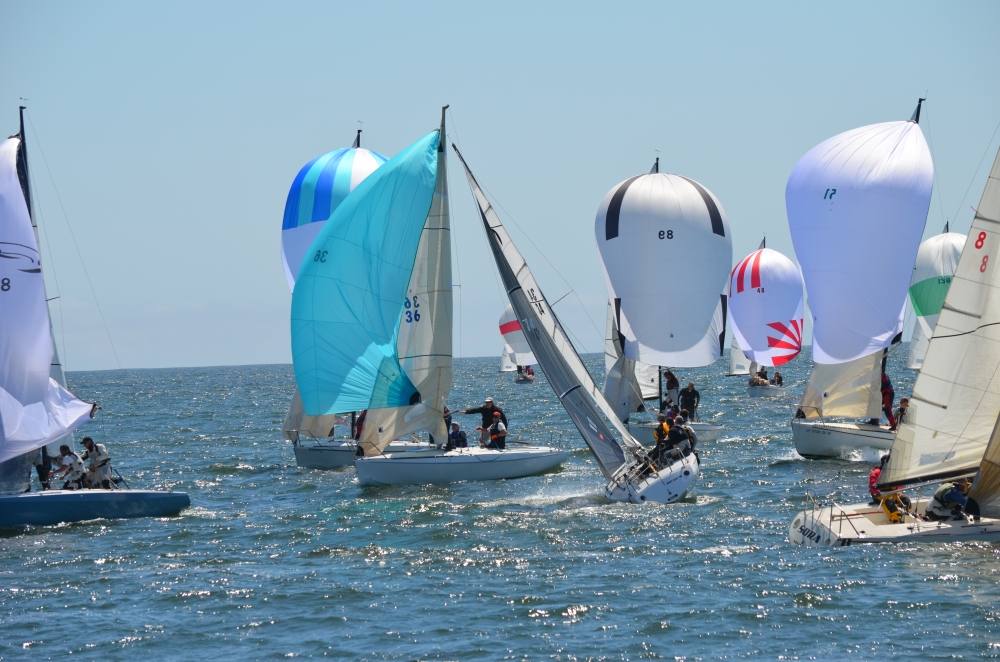
Traffic at the leward mark during the 2014 Moore 24 & SCORE Regattas at the Santa Cruz Yacht Club

The Santa Cruz Yacht Club hosts & co-hosts several major regatta events throughout the year. The Santa Cruz Yacht Club has also hosted a wide variety of Local, Regional, National, North American, and World Championship Regattas.

==== Recurring Regattas ====
- Windjammers Regatta; Fleets designated by Monterey Bay PHRF Rating
- The Day on the Bay Benefit Regatta; Regatta proceeds benefit a local Santa Cruz County community organization.
- One Design (Spring & Fall regattas); Fleets designated by One Design Rules
- SCORE (Santa Cruz Ocean Racing Extravaganza); Fleets designated by Monterey Bay PHRF Rating
- Commodore's Regatta
- Made in Santa Cruz (MISC) Race Week; Fleets designated by boat manufacture and class. All boats must be manufactured in Santa Cruz County.
- The West Marine Fun Regatta (which benefits junior sailing)
- The Jack & Jill double-handed regatta; Fleets designated by Monterey Bay PHRF Rating.
- Monterey Bay Double Angle Regatta; Fleets designated by Monterey Bay PHRF Rating.
- Hobie / Multihull Regatta
- Junior Olympics Festival / Bay Area Youth Sailing regatta

==== Championships ====
- Santa Cruz Champion of Champions Championship
- Laser Northern California Championships
- Santa Cruz 27 National Championship
- Moore 24 National Championship
- Santana 22 National Championship
- 1992 5O5 World Championship
- 2007 29er National Championship
- 2004 LightSurf International 5O5 World Championship
- 2011 5O5 Pacific Coast Championship
- 2012 Flying Dutchman North American Championship
- 2012 Moore 24 Pacific Coast Championship
- 2013 Laser U.S. National Championship
- 2014 Open 5.70 Pacific Coast Championship
- 2014 5O5 North American Championship
- 2014 Cardboard Kayak Regatta

=== Community Events ===
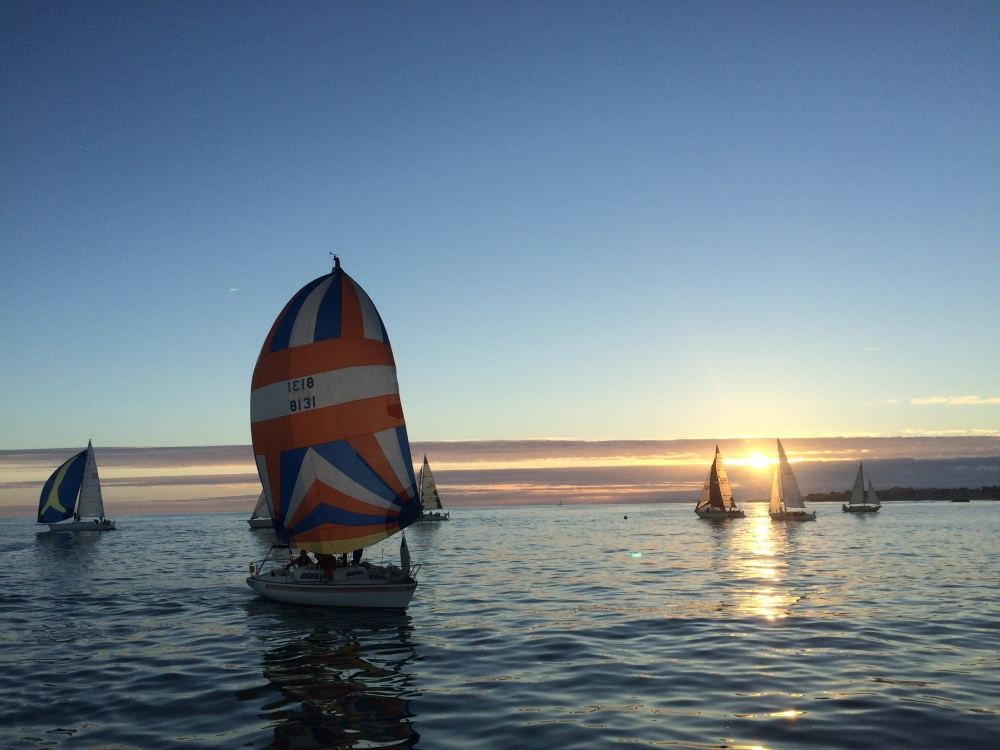
Wednesday night sailing on the Monterey Bay off Santa Cruz, California at sunset in September, 2014 with the Santa Cruz Yacht Club

The Santa Cruz Yacht Club hosts casual community rabbit-start regattas on Wednesday night during Daylight Savings. The Santa Cruz Yacht Club is the major organizer and sponsor of the annual Santa Cruz Lighted Boat Parade in late December. The Santa Cruz Yacht Club hosts informational seminars throughout non-Daylight Savings weeks and periodically throughout the year. Topics range from sailing, safety, and boat handling, to policy, environmental science, and engineering.

== Members of Note ==
- Joy Free: The Santa Cruz Yacht Club's first female commodore.
- Bill Lee: Boat Builder, Pioneer of ULDB Boats, Skipper of "Merlin." Set records for the Transpacific Yacht Race (TransPac).
- Morgan Larson: Skipper of the Swiss, Alinghi boat which won the 2014 Extreme Sailing Series
- Mike Holt: 2014 5O5 World Champion
- Karl Robrock: Skipper of SNAFU, winner of the 2014 Pacific Cup, Iwi Double-Handed Division

== Yachts of Note ==
- Merlin: 1977, 1981, 1987 Transpac "First To Finish"; 1993 Transpac Division and Overall Winner; 1977 to 1997 Transpac "Fully Crewed Monohull Elapsed time" Record Holder for 8 days, 11 hours and 1 minute;
