= Moore 24 =

1970s recreational keelboat

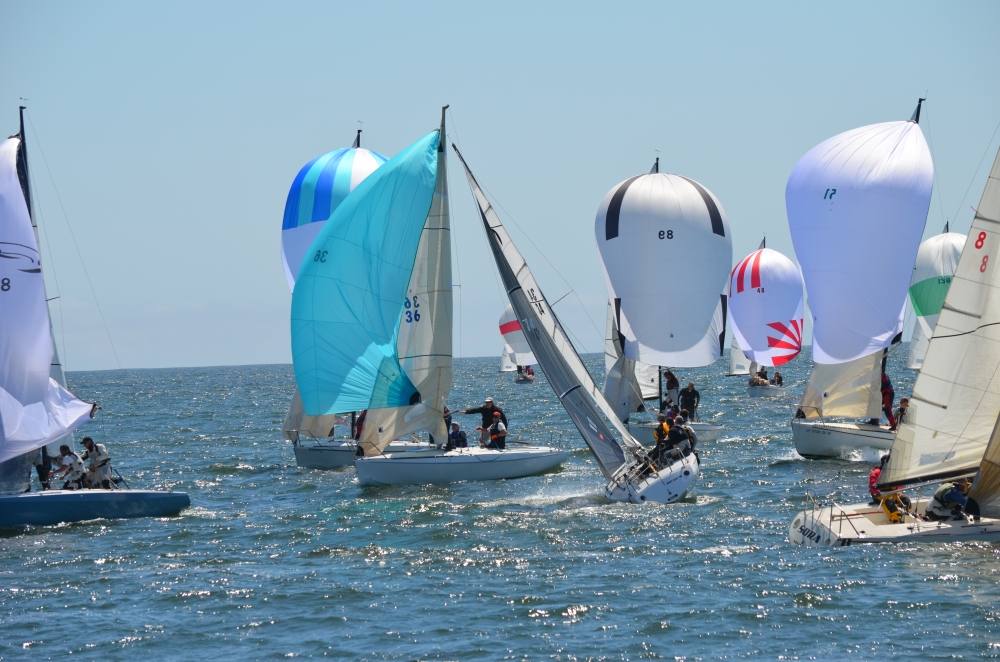

Development
- Designer: George Olson and Ron Moore
- Location: United States
- Year: 1972
- No. built: 158 (2021)
- Builder: Moore Sailboats
- Role: Racer
- Name: Moore 24

Boat
- Displacement: 2,050 lb (930 kg)
- Draft: 4.08 ft (1.24 m)

Hull
- Type: monohull
- Construction: fiberglass
- LOA: 23.75 ft (7.24 m)
- LWL: 21.75 ft (6.63 m)
- Beam: 7.17 ft (2.19 m)
- Engine: outboard motor

Hull appendages
- Keel: fin keel
- Ballast: 1,000 lb (454 kg)
- Rudder: internally-mounted spade-type rudder

Rig
- Rig type: Bermuda rig
- I foretriangle height: 26.25 ft (8.00 m)
- J foretriangle base: 9.75 ft (2.97 m)
- P mainsail luff: 25.00 ft (7.62 m)
- E mainsail foot: 9.50 ft (2.90 m)

Sails
- Sailplan: fractional rigged sloop
- Mainsail area: 118.75 sq ft (11.032 m^{2})
- Jib/genoa area: 127.97 sq ft (11.889 m^{2})
- Total sail area: 246.72 sq ft (22.921 m^{2})

Racing
- Class association: MORC
- PHRF: 150-156

The Moore 24 is a recreational keelboat built by Moore Sailboats in the United States. The company built 156 boats between 1972 and 1988, with two more in more recent years, for a total of 158. The design remains in production.

== Design ==
The Moore 24 is a development of Grendel, a prototype sailboat that was intended for a Transpacific Yacht Race for boats under 30 ft (9.1 m) in length. That race was never held, but Grendel went on to win the 1970 Midget Ocean Racing Class (MORC) championships. Grendel had a beam of under 6 ft (1.8 m), but the production boat was given a wider beam of 7.17 ft (2.19 m). The Moore 24 also received a raised deck to increase headroom below, a relocated keel and a new sail plan. Development has continued though the production period of the boat and production boats in 2021 were all flush-decked, with open transoms, while remaining class-legal.

The Moore 24 is built predominantly of fiberglass, with wood trim. It has a fractional sloop rig, a raked stem, a reverse transom, an internally mounted spade-type rudder controlled by a tiller and a fixed fin keel. It displaces 2,050 lb (930 kg) and carries 1,000 lb (454 kg) of ballast, giving it a high ballast-displacement of 48.78%.

The boat has a draft of 4.08 ft (1.24 m) with the standard keel. It is normally fitted with a small 2 to 4 hp (1 to 3 kW) outboard motor for docking and maneuvering. It has sleeping accommodation for two people. Cabin headroom is 42 in (107 cm).

The design has a PHRF racing average handicap of 156 according to The Sailor's Book of Small Cruising Sailboats and 150 according to the Yacht Racing Association of San Francisco Bay. It has a hull speed of 6.2 kn (11.5 km/h).

In a 2010 review Steve Henkel wrote, "best features: She's fast in heavy air; the high (50%) B/D ratio helps to keep the Moore 24 on her feet. Worst features: Due to her light weight and cramped cabin space, almost no one would want to buy this design as a cruising boat."

== Operational history ==
The boat is supported by an active class club that organizes racing events, the Moore 24 National Association.

Serial circumnavigator Webb Chiles sailed his Moore 24, Gannet, solo around the world from 2014–2019, departing and arriving San Diego, California.

In 2016 the Moore 24 Mas! won the Pacific Cup overall, double handed, crewed by Mark English and Ian Rogers. The two set a new course record for the Moore 24 of 10 days 14 hours and 30 minutes with a 240 mile best 24 hour run.
