= Tartan 34 =

Tartan 34 may refer to:

- Tartan 34 C a 1968 American sailboat design
- Tartan 34-2 a 1984 American sailboat design
