= Hinckley 38 =

Sailboat class

Development
- Designer: Sparkman & Stephens
- Location: Canada and United States
- Year: 1968
- No. built: 28
- Builders: Hughes Boat Works; Hinckley Yachts
- Role: Cruiser-Racer
- Name: Hinckley 38

Boat
- Displacement: 13,920 lb (6,314 kg)
- Draft: 5.67 ft (1.73 m)

Hull
- Type: monohull
- Construction: fibreglass
- LOA: 37.50 ft (11.43 m)
- LWL: 27.50 ft (8.38 m)
- Beam: 10.50 ft (3.20 m)
- Engine: Inboard engine

Hull appendages
- Keel: fin keel
- Ballast: 6,000 lb (2,722 kg)
- Rudder: skeg-mounted rudder

Rig
- Rig type: Bermuda rig
- I foretriangle height: 45.00 ft (13.72 m)
- J foretriangle base: 40.00 ft (12.19 m)
- P mainsail luff: 15.00 ft (4.57 m)
- E mainsail foot: 14.00 ft (4.27 m)

Sails
- Sailplan: masthead sloop
- Mainsail area: 280.00 sq ft (26.013 m^{2})
- Jib/genoa area: 337.50 sq ft (31.355 m^{2})
- Total sail area: 617.50 sq ft (57.368 m^{2})

The Hinckley 38 is a sailboat that was designed by Sparkman & Stephens as a cruiser-racer and first built in 1968.

The boat is a development of the Hughes 38-1 and, like that design and the Hughes 38-2, Hughes 38-3 and the North Star 38, is a version of Sparkman & Stephens' design number 1903.

== Production ==
The design's hulls were built by Hughes Boat Works in Centralia, Ontario, Canada and then shipped to Hinckley Yachts in Southwest Harbor, Maine, where the deck was added and the boat finished. Production ran from 1968 to 1970 with at total of 28 boats completed.

== Design ==
The Hinckley 38 is a recreational keelboat, built predominantly of fibreglass, with wood trim. It has a masthead sloop rig with a keel-stepped mast; a raked stem; a raised counter, reverse transom; a skeg-mounted rudder controlled by a wheel and a fixed, swept fin keel. It displaces 13,920 lb (6,314 kg) and carries 6,000 lb (2,722 kg) of ballast.

The boat has a draft of 5.67 ft (1.73 m) with the standard keel and is fitted with an inboard engine for docking and manoeuvring.

The design has sleeping accommodation for six people, with a double "V"-berth in the bow cabin and two a straight settees, plus two pilot berths in the main cabin. The galley is located on the port side just forward of the companionway ladder. The galley is L-shaped and is equipped with a three-burner stove, an ice box and a sink. A navigation station is opposite the galley, on the starboard side. The head is located just aft of the bow cabin on the port side.

For upwind sailing the design may be equipped with one of a series of jibs or genoas and for sailing downwind the design may be equipped with a symmetrical spinnaker.

The design has a hull speed of 7.03 kn (13.02 km/h).

== See also ==
- List of sailing boat types
