= Swift 40 =

Sailboat class

Development
- Designer: Sparkman & Stephens
- Location: South Korea
- Year: 1979
- Builder: Kang Nam Shipbuilders
- Role: Cruiser

Boat
- Displacement: 24,300 lb (11,022 kg)
- Draft: 5.25 ft (1.60 m)

Hull
- Type: monohull
- Construction: fiberglass
- LOA: 39.12 ft (11.92 m)
- LWL: 31.00 ft (9.45 m)
- Beam: 13.33 ft (4.06 m)
- Engine: Perkins Engines diesel engine

Hull appendages
- Keel: fin keel
- Ballast: 8,937 lb (4,054 kg)
- Rudder: skeg-mounted rudder

Rig
- Rig type: Bermuda rig

Sails
- Sailplan: masthead ketch
- Total sail area: 786.00 sq ft (73.022 m^{2})

The Swift 40 is a South Korean cruising sailboat that was designed by the American design firm Sparkman & Stephens and first built in 1979.

The Swift 40 is a version of Sparkman & Stephens' design number 2134, as are the North Star 80/20 and the Hughes 40, with different decks and coach roof designs.

== Production ==
The design was built by Kang Nam Shipbuilders in South Korea, from 1979 until 1984, but it is now out of production.

== Design ==
The Swift 40 is a recreational keelboat, built predominantly of fiberglass, with wood trim. It has a masthead ketch rig with a keel-stepped mast, a raked stem, an angled transom, a skeg-mounted rudder controlled by a wheel and a fixed fin keel. It displaces 24,300 lb (11,022 kg) and carries 8,937 lb (4,054 kg) of lead ballast.

The boat has a draft of 5.25 ft (1.60 m) with the standard keel.

The boat is fitted with a British Perkins Engines diesel engine for docking and maneuvering. The fuel tank holds 50 U.S. gallons (190 L; 42 imp gal) and the fresh water tank has a capacity of 168 U.S. gallons (640 L; 140 imp gal).

The design has sleeping accommodation for seven people, with a double "V"-berth in the bow cabin, a straight settee berth and drop-down dinette table that forms a double berth in the main cabin and an aft cabin with a double "V"-berth. The galley is located on the port side just forward of the companionway ladder. The galley is U-shaped and is equipped with a three-burner stove and a sink. A navigation station is opposite the galley, on the starboard side. There are two heads, one just aft of the bow cabin on the port side and one on the port side in the aft cabin.

The design has a hull speed of 7.46 kn (13.82 km/h).

== See also ==
- List of sailing boat types

Related development

- Hughes 40
- North Star 80/20
