= Hughes 38 =

Hughes 38 may refer to one of three related sailboat designs:

- Hughes 38-1
- Hughes 38-2
- Hughes 38-3
