= SHE 36 =

Sailboat class

Development
- Designer: Sparkman & Stephens
- Location: United Kingdom
- Year: 1977
- Builder: South Hants Engineering
- Role: Racer-Cruiser
- Name: SHE 36

Boat
- Displacement: 14,580 lb (6,613 kg)
- Draft: 6.30 ft (1.92 m)

Hull
- Type: monohull
- Construction: glassfibre
- LOA: 35.50 ft (10.82 m)
- LWL: 29.50 ft (8.99 m)
- Beam: 10.50 ft (3.20 m)
- Engine: Bukh A/S 20 hp (15 kW) diesel engine

Hull appendages
- Keel: fin keel
- Ballast: 5,400 lb (2,449 kg)
- Rudder: skeg-mounted rudder

Rig
- Rig type: Bermuda rig
- I foretriangle height: 41.10 ft (12.53 m)
- J foretriangle base: 14.30 ft (4.36 m)
- P mainsail luff: 37.10 ft (11.31 m)
- E mainsail foot: 10.00 ft (3.05 m)

Sails
- Sailplan: masthead sloop
- Mainsail area: 185.50 sq ft (17.234 m^{2})
- Jib/genoa area: 293.87 sq ft (27.301 m^{2})
- Total sail area: 479.37 sq ft (44.535 m^{2})

The SHE 36 is a British sailboat that was designed by Sparkman & Stephens as an International Offshore Rule Three-Quarter Ton class racer-cruiser and first built in 1977.

The SHE 36 is a development of Sparkman & Stephens' design 2166, with the rudder moved aft, giving a longer waterline, a deep keel and other changes. The basic Sparkman & Stephens' design 2166 is also used by the Aura A35, Hughes 35 and the North Star 1500.

== Production ==
The design was built by South Hants Engineering in the United Kingdom, starting in 1977, but it is now out of production.

== Design ==
The SHE 36 is a recreational keelboat, built predominantly of glassfibre, with wood trim. It has a masthead sloop rig, a raked stem, a reverse transom, a skeg-mounted rudder controlled by a wheel and a fixed swept fin keel. It displaces 14,580 lb (6,613 kg) and carries 5,400 lb (2,449 kg) of lead ballast.

The boat has a draft of 6.30 ft (1.92 m) with the standard keel.

The boat is fitted with a Danish Bukh A/S diesel engine of 20 hp (15 kW) for docking and manoeuvring. The fuel tank holds 12 U.S. gallons (45 L; 10.0 imp gal) and the fresh water tank has a capacity of 26 U.S. gallons (98 L; 22 imp gal).

The design has sleeping accommodation for six people, with a double "V"-berth in the bow cabin, two straight settees and a pilot berth in the main cabin and an aft cabin with a single berth on the port side. The galley is located on the starboard side at the companionway ladder. The galley is equipped with a two-burner stove and a sink. A navigation station is opposite the galley, on the port side. The head is located just aft of the bow cabin on the port side.

The design has a hull speed of 7.28 kn (13.48 km/h).

== Operational history ==
The boat was supported by an active class club, the IOR 3/4 Ton Class, which organized racing events until its demise in 1994.

== See also ==
- List of sailing boat types

Related development

- Aura A35
- Hughes 35
- North Star 1500
