= North Star 600 =

Sailboat class

Development
- Designer: Sparkman & Stephens
- Location: Canada
- Year: 1975
- Builder: Hughes Boat Works
- Role: Racer-Cruiser
- Name: North Star 600

Boat
- Displacement: 4,598 lb (2,086 kg)
- Draft: 4.00 ft (1.22 m)

Hull
- Type: monohull
- Construction: fibreglass
- LOA: 25.96 ft (7.91 m)
- LWL: 20.25 ft (6.17 m)
- Beam: 9.00 ft (2.74 m)
- Engine: Universal Atomic 2 gasoline engine

Hull appendages
- Keel: fin keel
- Ballast: 2,000 lb (907 kg)
- Rudder: skeg-mounted rudder

Rig
- Rig type: Bermuda rig
- I foretriangle height: 31.00 ft (9.45 m)
- J foretriangle base: 11.00 ft (3.35 m)
- P mainsail luff: 26.50 ft (8.08 m)
- E mainsail foot: 9.50 ft (2.90 m)

Sails
- Sailplan: masthead sloop
- Mainsail area: 125.88 sq ft (11.695 m^{2})
- Jib/genoa area: 170.50 sq ft (15.840 m^{2})
- Total sail area: 296.38 sq ft (27.535 m^{2})

The North Star 600 is a Canadian sailboat that was designed by the American design firm Sparkman & Stephens as a racer-cruiser and first built in 1975. The boat is Sparkman & Stephens' design number 2135.2. It was also sold under the name North Star 26 and Hughes 26 after Hughes bought the company back in 1977.

The design is a larger, heavier development of the North Star 500, with a coach house roof added.

== Production ==
The design was built by North Star Yachts and Hughes Boat Works in Canada, from 1975 to 1977, but it is now out of production.

== Design ==
The North Star 600 is a recreational keelboat, built predominantly of fibreglass, with wood trim. It has a masthead sloop rig, a raked stem, a nearly plumb transom, a skeg-mounted rudder controlled by a tiller and a fixed fin keel. It displaces 4,598 lb (2,086 kg) and carries 2,000 lb (907 kg) of ballast.

The boat has a draft of 4.00 ft (1.22 m) with the standard keel and is fitted with a Universal Atomic 2 gasoline engine for docking and manoeuvring.

The design has sleeping accommodation for five people, with a double "V"-berth in the bow cabin, a drop down dinette table that forms a double berth in the main cabin and an aft quarter berth on the starboard side. The galley is located on the starboard side, amidships. The galley is equipped with a two-burner stove, ice box and a sink. The head is located in the bow cabin on the port side under the "V"-berth.

The design has a hull speed of 6.03 kn (11.17 km/h).

== See also ==
- List of sailing boat types
