= North Star 38 =

Sailboat class

Development
- Designer: Sparkman & Stephens
- Location: Canada
- Year: 1971
- Builder: North Star Yachts
- Role: Cruiser-Racer

Boat
- Displacement: 12,500 lb (5,670 kg)
- Draft: 6.00 ft (1.83 m)

Hull
- Type: monohull
- Construction: fibreglass
- LOA: 37.83 ft (11.53 m)
- LWL: 27.00 ft (8.23 m)
- Beam: 10.17 ft (3.10 m)
- Engine: Universal Atomic 4 gasoline engine

Hull appendages
- Keel: fin keel
- Ballast: 6,400 lb (2,903 kg)
- Rudder: skeg-mounted rudder

Rig
- Rig type: Bermuda rig
- I foretriangle height: 43.50 ft (13.26 m)
- J foretriangle base: 14.50 ft (4.42 m)
- P mainsail luff: 39.23 ft (11.96 m)
- E mainsail foot: 13.74 ft (4.19 m)

Sails
- Sailplan: masthead sloop
- Mainsail area: 269.51 sq ft (25.038 m^{2})
- Jib/genoa area: 315.38 sq ft (29.300 m^{2})
- Total sail area: 584.89 sq ft (54.338 m^{2})

The North Star 38 is a Canadian sailboat that was designed by Sparkman & Stephens as a cruiser-racer and first built in 1971.

The North Star 38 is a development of the Hughes 38-2 with a lighter displacement and other minor changes. All of the Hughes 38 series and the North Star 38 itself are all versions of the basic Sparkman & Stephens' hull design number 1903.

== Production ==
The design was built by North Star Yachts in Canada, after Hughes Boat Works was purchased by U.S. Steel and renamed in 1969. The boat was built from 1971 until 1976. It was replaced by the Hughes 38-3 in 1977 after previous owner Howard Hughes bought the company back.

== Design ==
The North Star 38 is a recreational keelboat, built predominantly of fibreglass, with wood trim. It has a masthead sloop rig; a raked stem; a raised counter, reverse transom; a skeg-mounted rudder and a swept, fixed fin keel. It displaces 12,500 lb (5,670 kg) and carries 6,400 lb (2,903 kg) of ballast.

The boat has a draft of 6.00 ft (1.83 m) with the standard keel, is fitted with a Universal Atomic 4 gasoline engine for docking and manoeuvring and has a hull speed of 6.96 kn (12.89 km/h).

== See also ==
- List of sailing boat types
