= Hughes 35 =

Sailboat class

Development
- Designer: Sparkman & Stephens
- Location: Canada
- Year: 1977
- Builder: Hughes Boat Works
- Role: Cruiser-Racer

Boat
- Displacement: 12,000 lb (5,443 kg)
- Draft: 5.80 ft (1.77 m)

Hull
- Type: monohull
- Construction: fibreglass
- LOA: 35.50 ft (10.82 m)
- LWL: 26.00 ft (7.92 m)
- Beam: 10.33 ft (3.15 m)
- Engine: inboard engine

Hull appendages
- Keel: fin keel
- Ballast: 5,400 lb (2,449 kg)
- Rudder: skeg-mounted rudder

Rig
- Rig type: Bermuda rig
- I foretriangle height: 42.60 ft (12.98 m)
- J foretriangle base: 14.50 ft (4.42 m)
- P mainsail luff: 37.78 ft (11.52 m)
- E mainsail foot: 10.27 ft (3.13 m)

Sails
- Sailplan: masthead sloop
- Mainsail area: 194.00 sq ft (18.023 m^{2})
- Jib/genoa area: 308.85 sq ft (28.693 m^{2})
- Total sail area: 502.85 sq ft (46.716 m^{2})

The Hughes 35 is a Canadian sailboat that was designed by Sparkman & Stephens as a cruiser-racer and first built in 1977.

The Hughes 35 is a development of the North Star 1500, which was built by North Star Yachts prior to Howard Hughes re-acquiring the company in 1977. Both the Hughes 35 and the North Star 35 are variants of Sparkman & Stephens's design number 2166 as are the Aura A35 and the SHE 36.

== Production ==
The design was built by Hughes Boat Works in Canada, starting in 1977, but it is now out of production.

== Design ==
The Hughes 35 is a recreational keelboat, built predominantly of fibreglass, with wood trim. It has a masthead sloop rig, a raked stem, a reverse transom a skeg-mounted rudder controlled by a wheel and a swept fixed fin keel. It displaces 12,000 lb (5,443 kg) and carries 5,400 lb (2,449 kg) of ballast.

The boat has a draft of 5.80 ft (1.77 m) with the standard keel.

The boat is fitted with an inboard engine for docking and manoeuvring and has a hull speed of 6.83 kn (12.65 km/h).

== See also ==
- List of sailing boat types

Related development

- Aura A35
- North Star 1500
- SHE 36
