= Hughes 31 =

Recreational keelboat 1st built 1979

Development
- Designer: Sparkman & Stephens
- Location: Canada
- Year: 1979
- Builder: Hughes Boat Works
- Role: Cruiser
- Name: Hughes 31

Boat
- Displacement: 9,100 lb (4,128 kg)
- Draft: 5.00 ft (1.52 m)

Hull
- Type: monohull
- Construction: fibreglass
- LOA: 31.00 ft (9.45 m)
- LWL: 24.00 ft (7.32 m)
- Beam: 9.67 ft (2.95 m)
- Engine: OMC Saildrive gasoline engine or a Yanmar 2GM diesel engine

Hull appendages
- Keel: fin keel
- Ballast: 3,350 lb (1,520 kg)
- Rudder: skeg-mounted rudder

Rig
- Rig type: Bermuda rig
- I foretriangle height: 35.50 ft (10.82 m)
- J foretriangle base: 12.80 ft (3.90 m)
- P mainsail luff: 34.00 ft (10.36 m)
- E mainsail foot: 9.80 ft (2.99 m)

Sails
- Sailplan: masthead sloop
- Mainsail area: 166.60 sq ft (15.478 m^{2})
- Jib/genoa area: 227.20 sq ft (21.108 m^{2})
- Total sail area: 393.80 sq ft (36.585 m^{2})

The Hughes 31 is a recreational keelboat built by Hughes Boat Works in Canada. About 250 were built from 1979 to 1982.

It was designed by Sparkman & Stephens, derived from their North Star 1000 by extending the transom, increasing the beam, and making the coach house roof larger to increase cabin space. The design is IOR influenced.

The fibreglass hull has a reverse transom, and a skeg-mounted rudder. It has a hull speed of 6.57 kn (12.17 km/h).
