= Columbia 8.7 =

Sailboat class

Development
- Designer: Alan Payne
- Location: Canada and United States
- Year: 1976
- No. built: 380
- Builder: Hughes Boat Works
- Role: Cruiser
- Name: Columbia 8.7

Boat
- Displacement: 8,500 lb (3,856 kg)
- Draft: 4.67 ft (1.42 m)

Hull
- Type: monohull
- Construction: fibreglass
- LOA: 28.58 ft (8.71 m)
- LWL: 23.17 ft (7.06 m)
- Beam: 10.00 ft (3.05 m)
- Engine: Universal Atomic 4 gasoline engine

Hull appendages
- Keel: fin keel
- Ballast: 3,500 lb (1,588 kg)
- Rudder: skeg-mounted rudder

Rig
- Rig type: Bermuda rig
- I foretriangle height: 37.50 ft (11.43 m)
- J foretriangle base: 12.30 ft (3.75 m)
- P mainsail luff: 32.30 ft (9.85 m)
- E mainsail foot: 11.50 ft (3.51 m)

Sails
- Sailplan: masthead sloop
- Mainsail area: 185.73 sq ft (17.255 m^{2})
- Jib/genoa area: 230.63 sq ft (21.426 m^{2})
- Total sail area: 416.35 sq ft (38.680 m^{2})

The Columbia 8.7 is a sailboat that was designed by Alan Payne as a cruiser and first built in 1976.

== Production ==
The design was built by Columbia Yachts in the United States from 1976 until 1979, when the moulds were purchased by Hughes Boat Works. Production continued at Hughes in Huron Park, Ontario in Canada from 1979 until 1982, after the company entered receivership. The moulds then went to Aura Yachts, who continued production of completed boats and kits until 1986 when Hughes Boatworks Inc. was re-formed and took over production once again. Production ended about 1987 with 380 boats completed. The Hughes plant was destroyed by fire in 1991 and the company wound up.

== Design ==
The Columbia 8.7 is a recreational keelboat, built predominantly of solid, hand-laid fibreglass, with a balsa-cored deck. It has a masthead sloop rig, a raked stem, slightly angled transom, a skeg-mounted rudder controlled by a tiller and a fixed fin keel. Some late-production boats had a wheel steering. It displaces 8,500 lb (3,856 kg) and carries 3,500 lb (1,588 kg) of ballast.

The boat has a draft of 4.67 ft (1.42 m) with the standard keel.

The boat was factory-fitted with a number of different engines for docking and manoeuvring, located under the removable companionway steps. The original Columbia boats were offered with a Universal Atomic 4 gasoline engine or a Swedish 13 hp (10 kW) Volvo MD 7 A diesel engine. Later factory engines included a Japanese Yanmar two-cylinder diesel engine of 15 hp (11 kW) and a Yanmar 22.5 hp (17 kW) three-cylinder diesel offered by Hughes as a factory option. At least some later Aura-built boats has a 18 hp (13 kW) Volvo 2002 diesel. The fuel tank holds 12 U.S. gallons (45 L; 10.0 imp gal) and the fresh water tank has a capacity of 13 U.S. gallons (49 L; 11 imp gal).

The design has sleeping accommodation for five people, with a double "V"-berth in the bow cabin, two straight settee berths in the main cabin and an aft quarter berth on the port side under the cockpit. The galley is located on the starboard side at the companionway ladder. The galley is L-shaped and is equipped with a two-burner stove, icebox and a sink. The head is located just aft of the bow cabin on the port side. Cabin headroom is 73 in (185 cm) and the interior is finished in teak.

The design has a hull speed of 6.45 kn (11.95 km/h).

== Operational history ==
In a 1997 review in Canadian Yachting, Pat Sturgeon wrote, "Alan Payne was somewhat ahead of his time when he designed this hull shape. The unique wine glass transom and flat sheer was a look that people tended to either love or hate, and the 10-foot beam, carried well aft, was a design feature that didn't become popular until the mid-eighties. But the Hughes' acquisition paid off, and the 8.7's debut at the Toronto Dockside show in 1979 was a big hit. Buyers found it was one of the few boats to offer over six feet of head room in a boat less than 30 feet in length."

In a used boat review in 2016, in Practical Sailor, Darrell Nicholson wrote, "For better or worse, the Columbia 8.7 is modern in appearance, with a very straight sheer, pronounced forward overhang, and no overhang aft. The stern is decidedly unusual, with an exaggerated wineglass section transom. This reduces the apparent size of the back end of the boat, which would otherwise look very ungainly since beam is carried well aft. From an aesthetic point of view, you either like the stern or you don't ... Because of her excellent balance under sail and relative stability, the boat would make a good entry-level coastal cruiser, even for relatively inexperienced sailors."

== See also ==
- List of sailing boat types
