= North Star 80/20 =

Sailboat class

Development
- Designer: Sparkman & Stephens
- Location: Canada
- Year: 1973
- Builder: North Star Yachts
- Role: Cruiser
- Name: North Star 80/20

Boat
- Displacement: 24,600 lb (11,158 kg)
- Draft: 4.75 ft (1.45 m)

Hull
- Type: monohull
- Construction: fibreglass
- LOA: 40.00 ft (12.19 m)
- LWL: 31.00 ft (9.45 m)
- Beam: 13.33 ft (4.06 m)
- Engine: Westerbeke 4-154 52 hp (39 kW) diesel engine

Hull appendages
- Keel: fin keel
- Ballast: 9,000 lb (4,082 kg)
- Rudder: skeg-mounted rudder

Rig
- Rig type: Bermuda rig
- I foretriangle height: 49.25 ft (15.01 m)
- J foretriangle base: 14.00 ft (4.27 m)
- P mainsail luff: 43.25 ft (13.18 m)
- E mainsail foot: 14.00 ft (4.27 m)

Sails
- Sailplan: masthead ketch
- Mainsail area: 302.75 sq ft (28.126 m^{2})
- Jib/genoa area: 344.75 sq ft (32.028 m^{2})
- Total sail area: 647.50 sq ft (60.155 m^{2})

The North Star 80/20 is a Canadian sailboat that was designed by Sparkman & Stephens as a cruiser and first built in 1973. The boat is a version of Sparkman & Stephens' design 2134.

A heavier version of the design was sold as the Hughes 40. Sparkman & Stephens design 2134 was also the basis for the Swift 40 built by Kang Nam Shipbuilders in South Korea.

== Production ==
The design was built by North Star Yachts in Canada, starting in 1973 and later by Hughes Boat Works, also in Canada, after Howard Hughes bought the company back and renamed both the company and the sailboat models sold.

== Design ==
The North Star 80/20 is a recreational keelboat, built predominantly of fibreglass, with wood trim. It has a masthead ketch rig, a centre cockpit, a raked stem, an angled transom, a skeg-mounted rudder controlled by a wheel and a fixed fin keel.

The boat is fitted with a Westerbeke 4-154 diesel engine of 52 hp (39 kW) for docking and manoeuvring. The fuel tank holds 75 U.S. gallons (280 L; 62 imp gal) and the fresh water tank has a capacity of 180 U.S. gallons (680 L; 150 imp gal).

The design has sleeping accommodation for seven people, with a double "V"-berth in the bow cabin, three straight settee berths in the main cabin and an aft cabin with a double "V"-berth. The galley is located on the starbord side just forward of the companionway ladder. The galley is U-shaped and is equipped with a three-burner stove and a sink. There are two heads, one just aft of the bow cabin on the starboard side and one on the starboard side in the aft cabin.

For sailing the design may be equipped with one of a number of jibs or genoas.

The design has a hull speed of 7.46 kn (13.82 km/h).

== Variants ==
North Star 80/20
This model built by North Star Yachts displaces 24,600 lb (11,158 kg) and carries 9,000 lb (4,082 kg) of ballast. The boat has a draft of 4.75 ft (1.45 m) with the standard keel.
Hughes 40
This model built by Hughes Boat Works displaces 28,000 lb (12,701 kg) and carries 9,200 lb (4,173 kg) of ballast. The boat has a draft of 4.67 ft (1.42 m) with the standard keel.

== Operational history ==
When new, some North Star 80/20s were employed in the Caribbean yacht charter market.

== See also ==
- List of sailing boat types

Related boats

- Swift 40
