= Nautor 43 =

Finnish sailboat class

Development
- Designer: Sparkman & Stephens
- Location: Finland
- Year: 1976
- No. built: 24
- Builder: Oy Nautor AB
- Role: Cruiser
- Name: Nautor 43

Boat
- Displacement: 31,967 lb (14,500 kg)
- Draft: 5.00 ft (1.52 m)

Hull
- Type: monohull
- Construction: glassfibre
- LOA: 42.75 ft (13.03 m)
- LWL: 31.42 ft (9.58 m)
- Beam: 13.78 ft (4.20 m)
- Engine: Perkins Engines 4-236 75 hp (56 kW) diesel engine

Hull appendages
- Keel: fin keel
- Ballast: 9,040 lb (4,100 kg)
- Rudder: skeg-mounted rudder

Rig
- Rig type: Masthead ketch
- I foretriangle height: 51.00 ft (15.54 m)
- J foretriangle base: 15.80 ft (4.82 m)
- P mainsail luff: 44.70 ft (13.62 m)
- E mainsail foot: 13.20 ft (4.02 m)

Sails
- Sailplan: ketch
- Mainsail area: 295.02 sq ft (27.408 m^{2})
- Jib/genoa area: 402.90 sq ft (37.431 m^{2})
- Other sails: mizzen: 134.08 sq ft (12.456 m^{2})
- Total sail area: 832.00 sq ft (77.295 m^{2})

The Nautor 43 is a Finnish sailboat that was designed by Sparkman & Stephens as a cruiser and first built in 1976. It was Sparkman & Stephens' design 2239.

The design was developed into the Nauticat 43 in 1983.

== Production ==
The design was built by Oy Nautor AB in Finland, from 1976 to 1979 with 24 boats completed, but it is now out of production.

== Design ==
The Nautor 43 is a recreational keelboat, built predominantly of glassfibre, with wood trim. It has a masthead ketch or optional sloop rig. The hull has a raked stem; a raised counter, angled transom; a skeg-mounted rudder controlled by a wheel and a fixed fin keel. It displaces 31,967 lb (14,500 kg) and carries 9,040 lb (4,100 kg) of lead ballast.

The boat has a draft of 5.00 ft (1.52 m) with the standard keel.

The boat is fitted with a British Perkins Engines 4-236 diesel engine of 75 hp (56 kW) for docking and manoeuvring. The fuel tank holds 290 U.S. gallons (1,100 L; 240 imp gal) and the fresh water tank has a capacity of 264 U.S. gallons (1,000 L; 220 imp gal).

The design has sleeping accommodation for five people, with a double "V"-berth in the bow cabin, an L-shaped settee and a straight settee in the main cabin and an aft cabin with a double berth on the port side and a single to starboard. The galley is located on the port side just aft of the companionway ladder. The galley is U-shaped and is equipped with a three-burner stove, an ice box and a double sink. A navigation station is opposite the galley, on the starboard side. There are two heads, one just aft of the bow cabin on the starboard side and one on the port side in the aft cabin.

The design has a hull speed of 7.52 kn (13.93 km/h).

== See also ==
- List of sailing boat types
