= Sun Odyssey 39 =

Sailboat class

Development
- Designer: Jacques Fauroux
- Location: France
- Year: 1990
- Builder: Jeanneau
- Role: Cruiser
- Name: Sun Odyssey 39

Boat
- Displacement: 14,330 lb (6,500 kg)
- Draft: 6.40 ft (1.95 m)

Hull
- Type: monohull
- Construction: fiberglass
- LOA: 38.83 ft (11.84 m)
- LWL: 32.38 ft (9.87 m)
- Beam: 12.76 ft (3.89 m)
- Engine: inboard diesel engine 50 hp (37 kW)

Hull appendages
- Keel: fin keel
- Ballast: 5,401 lb (2,450 kg)
- Rudder: skeg-mounted rudder

Rig
- Rig type: Bermuda rig
- I foretriangle height: 50.20 ft (15.30 m)
- J foretriangle base: 15.09 ft (4.60 m)
- P mainsail luff: 44.62 ft (13.60 m)
- E mainsail foot: 13.78 ft (4.20 m)

Sails
- Sailplan: masthead sloop
- Mainsail area: 307.43 sq ft (28.561 m^{2})
- Jib/genoa area: 378.76 sq ft (35.188 m^{2})
- Total sail area: 686.19 sq ft (63.749 m^{2})

The Sun Odyssey 39 is a French sailboat that was designed by Jacques Fauroux as a cruiser and first built in 1990.

The design is a cruising development of the 1988 Sun Charm 39 and the 1989 Sun Fast 39, with which it shares a hull design.

== Production ==
The design was built by Jeanneau in France, starting in 1990, but it is now out of production.

== Design ==
The Sun Odyssey 39 is a recreational keelboat, built predominantly of fiberglass, with wood trim. It has a masthead sloop rig. The hull has a raked stem, a reverse transom with steps and a swimming platform, a skeg-mounted rudder controlled by a wheel and a fixed fin keel or optional shoal draft wing keel. It displaces 14,330 lb (6,500 kg) and carries 5,401 lb (2,450 kg) of ballast.

The boat has a draft of 6.40 ft (1.95 m) with the standard keel and 5 ft (1.5 m) with the optional shoal draft wing keel.

The boat is fitted with an inboard diesel engine of 50 hp (37 kW) for docking and maneuvering. The fuel tank holds 37 U.S. gallons (140 L; 31 imp gal) and the fresh water tank has a capacity of 46 U.S. gallons (170 L; 38 imp gal).

The design has sleeping accommodation for four people, with a double "V"-berth in the bow cabin, a U-shaped settee and a straight settee in the main cabin and an aft cabin with a double berth on the starboard side. The galley is located on the port side just aft of the companionway ladder. The galley is U-shaped and is equipped with a two-burner stove, an ice box and a double sink. A navigation station is forward of the galley, on the port side. There are two heads, one just aft of the bow cabin on the starboard side and one on the starboard side forward of the aft cabin.

The design has a hull speed of 7.63 kn (14.13 km/h).

== See also ==
- List of sailing boat types
