= Seafarer 48 =

Sailboat class

Development
- Designer: Sparkman & Stephens
- Location: United States
- Year: 1969
- No. built: fewer than five
- Builder: Seafarer Yachts
- Role: Racer-Cruiser

Boat
- Displacement: 30,000 lb (13,608 kg)
- Draft: 7.00 ft (2.13 m)

Hull
- Type: monohull
- Construction: fiberglass
- LOA: 48.00 ft (14.63 m)
- LWL: 33.00 ft (10.06 m)
- Beam: 11.83 ft (3.61 m)
- Engine: inboard motor

Hull appendages
- Keel: fin keel
- Ballast: 15,700 lb (7,121 kg)
- Rudder: skeg-mounted rudder

Rig
- Rig type: Masthead yawl
- I foretriangle height: 54.50 ft (16.61 m)
- J foretriangle base: 18.33 ft (5.59 m)
- P mainsail luff: 48.10 ft (14.66 m)
- E mainsail foot: 18.04 ft (5.50 m)

Sails
- Sailplan: yawl
- Mainsail area: 433.86 sq ft (40.307 m^{2})
- Jib/genoa area: 499.49 sq ft (46.404 m^{2})
- Total sail area: 933.35 sq ft (86.711 m^{2})

The Seafarer 48 is an American sailboat that was designed by Sparkman & Stephens as a racer-cruiser and first built in 1969. It is S&S design #1956.

The boat was introduced at the 1969 New York Boat Show and was named Queen of the Show. It was one of the largest sailboats seen at the show.

The Seafarer 48 design was developed into the Hughes 48 and the Northstar 48.

== Production ==
The design was built by Seafarer Yachts in the United States, starting in 1969, but it is now out of production. It was the largest boat built by Seafarer, but fewer than five boats were likely built in total.

== Design ==
The Seafarer 48 is a recreational keelboat, built predominantly of fiberglass, with wood trim. It has a masthead yawl rig; a raked stem; a raised counter, angled transom; a skeg-mounted rudder controlled by a wheel and a fixed, swept fin keel. It displaces 30,000 lb (13,608 kg) and carries 15,700 lb (7,121 kg) of ballast.

The boat has a draft of 7.00 ft (2.13 m) with the standard keel. The boat is fitted with an inboard engine for docking and maneuvering.

The design has a hull speed of 7.7 kn (14.3 km/h).

== Operational history ==
This is a large mosaic showing the boat at an office building in Huntington, New York, where the Seafarer Yachts plant was once located.

== See also ==
- List of sailing boat types
