= PJ 30 1/2 Ton =

Sailboat class

PJ-30 1/2 Ton
Development
- Designer: Sparkman & Stephens
- Location: Canada/United States
- Year: 1973
- Builders: Palmer Johnson; Hughes Boat Works
- Role: Racer

Boat
- Displacement: 8,000 lb (3,629 kg)
- Draft: 5.30 ft (1.62 m)

Hull
- Type: monohull
- Construction: fibreglass
- LOA: 29.92 ft (9.12 m)
- LWL: 22.67 ft (6.91 m)
- Beam: 9.50 ft (2.90 m)
- Engine: Universal Atomic 4 gasoline engine

Hull appendages
- Keel: fin keel
- Ballast: 3,710 lb (1,683 kg)
- Rudder: skeg-mounted rudder

Rig
- Rig type: Bermuda rig
- I foretriangle height: 38.00 ft (11.58 m)
- J foretriangle base: 12.50 ft (3.81 m)
- P mainsail luff: 34.00 ft (10.36 m)
- E mainsail foot: 9.50 ft (2.90 m)

Sails
- Sailplan: masthead sloop
- Mainsail area: 161.50 sq ft (15.004 m^{2})
- Jib/genoa area: 237.50 sq ft (22.064 m^{2})
- Total sail area: 399.00 sq ft (37.068 m^{2})

The PJ-30 1/2 Ton is a sailboat that was designed by Sparkman & Stephens as an International Offshore Rule Half Ton class racer and first built in 1973. It was simultaneously sold in Canada with a different deck and coach house design as the North Star 1000. The boat is Sparkman & Stephens' design 2098-C6, based upon design 2098.

The design was developed into the Hughes 31 in 1979. Sparkman & Stephens' design 2098 is also used for the S&S 30 and the Sagitta 30.

== Production ==
The design was built by Palmer Johnson in the United States and by North Star Yachts in Canada, starting in 1973, but it is now out of production.

== Design ==
The PJ-30 1/2 Ton is a racing keelboat, built predominantly of fibreglass, with wood trim. It has a masthead sloop rig; a raked stem; a raised counter, reverse transom, a skeg-mounted rudder and a fixed fin keel. It displaces 8,000 lb (3,629 kg) and carries 3,710 lb (1,683 kg) of ballast.

The boat has a draft of 5.30 ft (1.62 m) with the standard keel.

The boat is fitted with a Universal Atomic 4 gasoline engine for docking and manoeuvring.

The design has sleeping accommodation for six people, with a double "V"-berth in the bow cabin and four settee and pilot berths in the main cabin. The galley is located on the starboard side abeam the companionway ladder. The galley is equipped with a two-burner stove and a sink. A navigation station is opposite the galley, on the port side. The head is located just aft of the bow cabin on the port side.

For sailing the design may be equipped with one of a number of jibs or genoas.

The design has a hull speed of 6.38 kn (11.82 km/h).

== Operational history ==
The boat is supported by an active class club that organizes racing events, the Half Ton Class.

== See also ==
- List of sailing boat types
