= Farr 727 =

Sailboat class

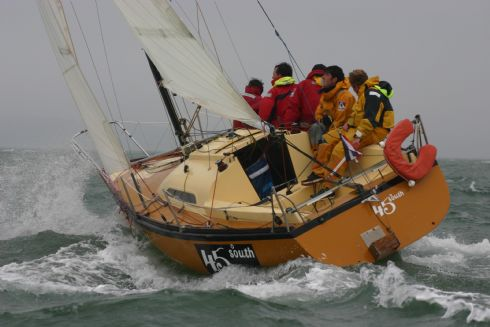
- The Farr 727 prototype, named 45 South won the Quarter Ton Cup in 1975.
- F727

Development
- Designer: Bruce Farr
- Location: New Zealand
- Year: 1976
- No. built: 76
- Builders: Alpha Marine; Chantier Mallard; North Star Yachts
- Role: Racer
- Name: Farr 727

Boat
- Displacement: 2,690 lb (1,220 kg)
- Draft: 4.67 ft (1.42 m)

Hull
- Type: monohull
- Construction: fibreglass
- LOA: 23.83 ft (7.26 m)
- LWL: 19.58 ft (5.97 m)
- Beam: 8.33 ft (2.54 m)

Hull appendages
- Keel: fin keel
- Ballast: 1,080 lb (490 kg)
- Rudder: skeg-mounted rudder

Rig
- Rig type: Bermuda rig
- I foretriangle height: 24.40 ft (7.44 m)
- J foretriangle base: 7.80 ft (2.38 m)
- P mainsail luff: 25.70 ft (7.83 m)
- E mainsail foot: 10.90 ft (3.32 m)

Sails
- Sailplan: fractional rigged sloop
- Mainsail area: 140.07 sq ft (13.013 m^{2})
- Jib/genoa area: 95.16 sq ft (8.841 m^{2})
- Total sail area: 235.23 sq ft (21.854 m^{2})

The Farr 727 is a trailerable sailboat that was designed by New Zealander Bruce Farr as an International Offshore Rule Quarter Ton class racer and first built in 1976. The boat was also built in Canada as the North Star 727.

The boat's designation indicates its approximate length overall in decimetres.

== Production ==
The design was built by Alpha Marine in New Zealand, Chantier Mallard in France and by North Star Yachts in Canada, starting in 1976. A total of 76 boats were built by Alpha and Mallard, but it is now out of production. The moulds used by North Star came from Alpha in New Zealand, but without royalties paid to the designer.

== Design ==
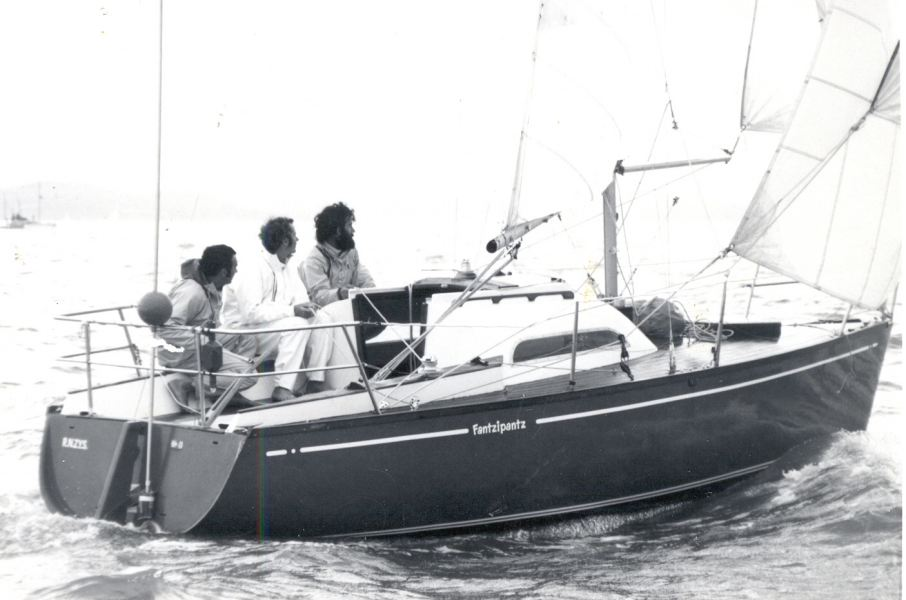
Farr 727

The Farr 727 is a recreational keelboat, built predominantly of fibreglass, with wood trim. It has a fractional sloop rig, a raked stem, a reverse transom, a skeg-mounted rudder controlled by a tiller and a fixed fin keel.

The boat has a draft of 4.67 ft (1.42 m) with the standard keel.

The design has sleeping accommodation for five people, with a double "V"-berth in the bow cabin, a straight settee in the main cabin and two quarter berths aft. The galley is located on the port side amidships and is equipped with a two-burner stove and a sink. The head is located in the bow cabin on the port side under the "V"-berth.

For sailing downwind the design may be equipped with a symmetrical spinnaker.

The design has a hull speed of 5.93 kn (10.98 km/h).

== Variants ==
Farr 727
This model was built by Alpha and Mallard. It displaces 2,690 lb (1,220 kg) and carries 1,080 lb (490 kg) of ballast. It has a sail area of 235 sq ft (21.8 m^{2}).
North Star 727
This model was built by North Star. It displaces 2,700 lb (1,225 kg) and carries 900 lb (408 kg) of ballast. It has a sail area of 240 sq ft (22 m^{2}).

== Operational history ==
The boat is supported by an active class club that organizes racing events, the Quarter Ton Class.

The design prototype, named 45 South, won the Quarter Ton Cup in 1975.

During the JOG Tasman Cup on 15 April 1983, four boats sunk, including the Farr 727 Waikikamukau. One of the four crew members drowned in the sinking, due to the rapid filling of the boat and being tethered to the hull.

== See also ==
- List of sailing boat types
