= Aura A35 =

Sailboat class

Development
- Designer: Sparkman & Stephens
- Location: United States
- Year: 1975
- Builder: Aura Yachts
- Role: Cruiser-Racer
- Name: Aura A35

Boat
- Displacement: 12,000 lb (5,443 kg)
- Draft: 5.83 ft (1.78 m)

Hull
- Type: monohull
- Construction: fiberglass
- LOA: 35.50 ft (10.82 m)
- LWL: 26.00 ft (7.92 m)
- Beam: 11.00 ft (3.35 m)
- Engine: Universal inboard engine

Hull appendages
- Keel: fin keel
- Ballast: 5,400 lb (2,449 kg)
- Rudder: skeg-mounted rudder

Rig
- Rig type: Bermuda rig
- I foretriangle height: 42.60 ft (12.98 m)
- J foretriangle base: 14.50 ft (4.42 m)
- P mainsail luff: 37.80 ft (11.52 m)
- E mainsail foot: 10.30 ft (3.14 m)

Sails
- Sailplan: masthead sloop
- Mainsail area: 194.67 sq ft (18.085 m^{2})
- Jib/genoa area: 308.85 sq ft (28.693 m^{2})
- Total sail area: 503.52 sq ft (46.779 m^{2})

The Aura A35 is an American sailboat that was designed by Sparkman & Stephens as a cruiser-racer and first built in 1975.

The A35 is a version of Sparkman & Stephens's design 2166, as are the Hughes 35, North Star 1500 and the SHE 36.

== Production ==
The design was built by Aura Yachts in the United States, starting in 1975, but it is now out of production.

== Design ==
The A35 is a recreational keelboat, built predominantly of fiberglass, with wood trim. It has a masthead sloop rig, a skeg-mounted rudder and a fixed fin keel. It displaces 12,000 lb (5,443 kg) and carries 5,400 lb (2,449 kg) of ballast.

The boat has a draft of 5.83 ft (1.78 m) with the standard keel and is fitted with a Universal inboard engine for docking and maneuvering.

The design has a hull speed of 6.83 kn (12.65 km/h).

== See also ==
- List of sailing boat types

Related development

- Hughes 35
- North Star 1500
- SHE 36
