= North Star 1500 =

Canadian sailboat

Development
- Designer: Sparkman & Stephens
- Location: Canada
- Year: 1974
- Builder: North Star Yachts
- Role: Cruiser-Racer

Boat
- Displacement: 11,040 lb (5,008 kg)
- Draft: 5.83 ft (1.78 m)

Hull
- Type: monohull
- Construction: fibreglass
- LOA: 35.50 ft (10.82 m)
- LWL: 26.00 ft (7.92 m)
- Beam: 10.33 ft (3.15 m)
- Engine: Universal Atomic 4 gasoline engine 30 hp (22 kW)

Hull appendages
- Keel: fin keel
- Ballast: 5,400 lb (2,449 kg)
- Rudder: skeg-mounted rudder

Rig
- Rig type: Bermuda rig
- I foretriangle height: 42.60 ft (12.98 m)
- J foretriangle base: 14.50 ft (4.42 m)
- P mainsail luff: 37.80 ft (11.52 m)
- E mainsail foot: 10.30 ft (3.14 m)

Sails
- Sailplan: masthead sloop
- Mainsail area: 194.67 sq ft (18.085 m^{2})
- Jib/genoa area: 308.85 sq ft (28.693 m^{2})
- Total sail area: 502.52 sq ft (46.686 m^{2})

The North Star 1500, also called the North Star 35, is a Canadian sailboat that was designed by Sparkman & Stephens as a cruiser-racer and first built in 1974.

The North Star 1500 was developed into the Hughes 35 and was built by Hughes Boat Works after Howard Hughes reacquired the company in 1977. Both the North Star 35 and the Hughes 35 are variants of Sparkman & Stephens's design number 2166, as are the Aura A35 and the SHE 36.

== Production ==
The design was built by North Star Yachts in Canada, starting in 1974, but it is now out of production.

== Design ==
The North Star 1500 is a recreational keelboat, built predominantly of fibreglass, with wood trim. It has a masthead sloop rig, a raked stem, a reverse transom a skeg-mounted rudder controlled by a wheel and a swept fixed fin keel. It displaces 11,040 lb (5,008 kg) and carries 5,400 lb (2,449 kg) of ballast. A tall rig, with a mast about 1.5 ft (0.5 m) higher and 95 more sail area was available for sailing in areas with lighter winds.

The boat has a draft of 5.83 ft (1.78 m) with the standard keel and 4.80 m (15.7 ft) with the optional shoal draft keel.

The boat is fitted with a Universal Atomic 4 gasoline engine 30 hp (22 kW) for docking and manoeuvring and has a hull speed of 6.83 kn (12.65 km/h). The fuel tank holds 20 U.S. gallons (76 L; 17 imp gal) and the fresh water tank has a capacity of 25 U.S. gallons (95 L; 21 imp gal).

The design has sleeping accommodation for six people, with a double "V"-berth in the bow cabin, two straight settees in the main cabin and an aft cabin with a double berth on the starboard side. The galley is located on the port side just forward of the companionway ladder. The galley is L-shaped and is equipped with a two-burner stove, an ice box and a sink. A navigation station is opposite the galley, on the starboard side. The head is located just aft of the bow cabin on the port side. Cabin headroom is 6.33 in (16 cm).

== See also ==
- List of sailing boat types

Related development

- Aura A35
- Hughes 35
- SHE 36
