= Hughes 25 =

1960s Canadian keelboat

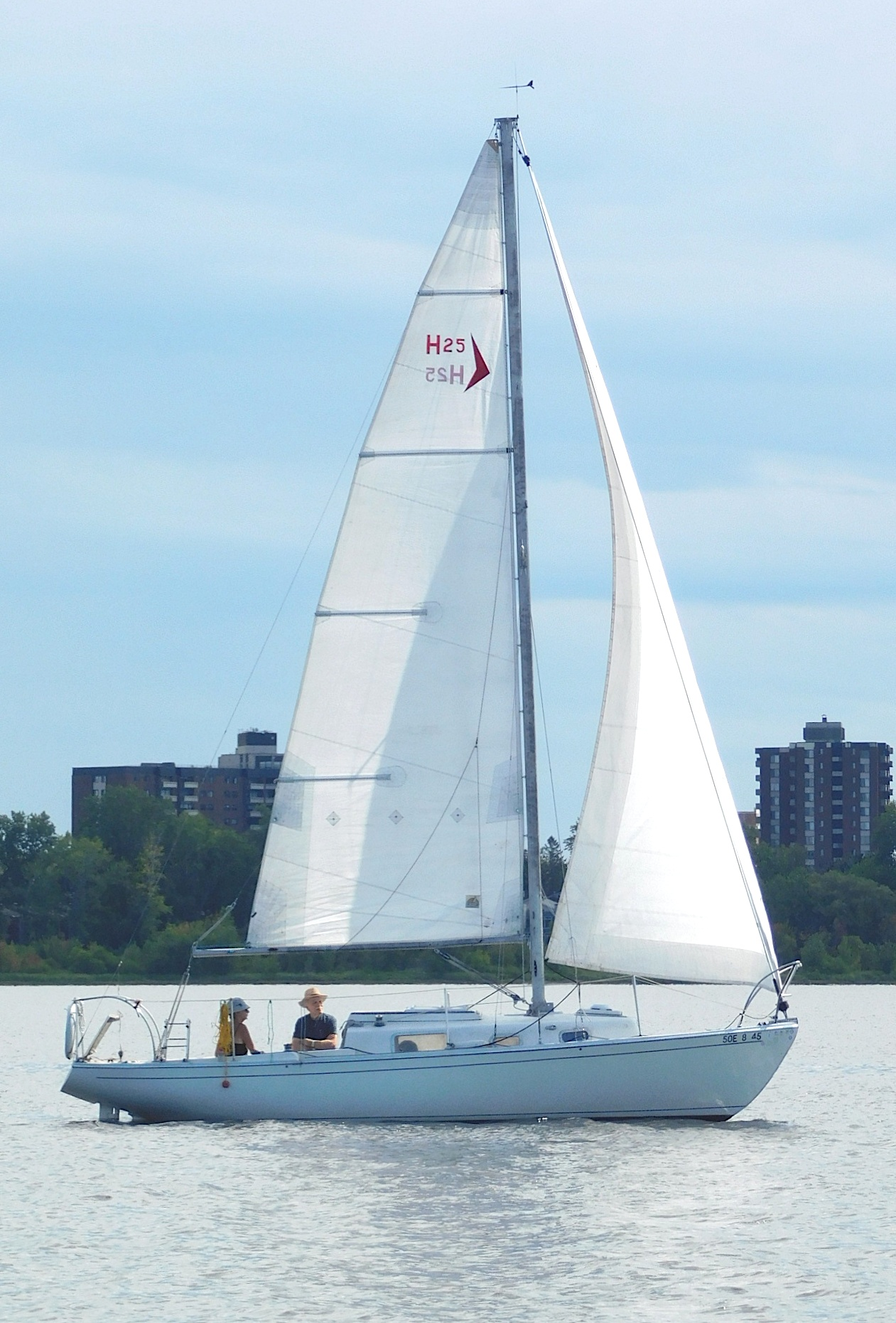

Development
- Designer: Howard Hughes
- Location: Canada
- Year: 1968
- Builder: Hughes Boat Works
- Role: Cruiser
- Name: Hughes 25

Boat
- Displacement: 3,500 lb (1,588 kg)
- Draft: 3.25 ft (0.99 m)

Hull
- Type: monohull
- Construction: fibreglass
- LOA: 25.17 ft (7.67 m)
- LWL: 19.00 ft (5.79 m)
- Beam: 7.50 ft (2.29 m)

Hull appendages
- Keel: fin keel
- Ballast: 1,600 lb (726 kg)
- Rudder: internally-mounted spade-type rudder

Rig
- Rig type: Bermuda rig
- I foretriangle height: 31.50 ft (9.60 m)
- J foretriangle base: 8.33 ft (2.54 m)
- P mainsail luff: 27.67 ft (8.43 m)
- E mainsail foot: 10.00 ft (3.05 m)

Sails
- Sailplan: fractional rigged sloop masthead sloop
- Mainsail area: 138.35 sq ft (12.853 m^{2})
- Jib/genoa area: 131.20 sq ft (12.189 m^{2})
- Total sail area: 269.55 sq ft (25.042 m^{2})

The Hughes 25 is a recreational keelboat that is most likely a development of William Shaw's Nutmeg 24 design. It was built by Hughes Boat Works in Canada, starting in 1968 and proved commercially successful. It is now out of production.

== Design ==
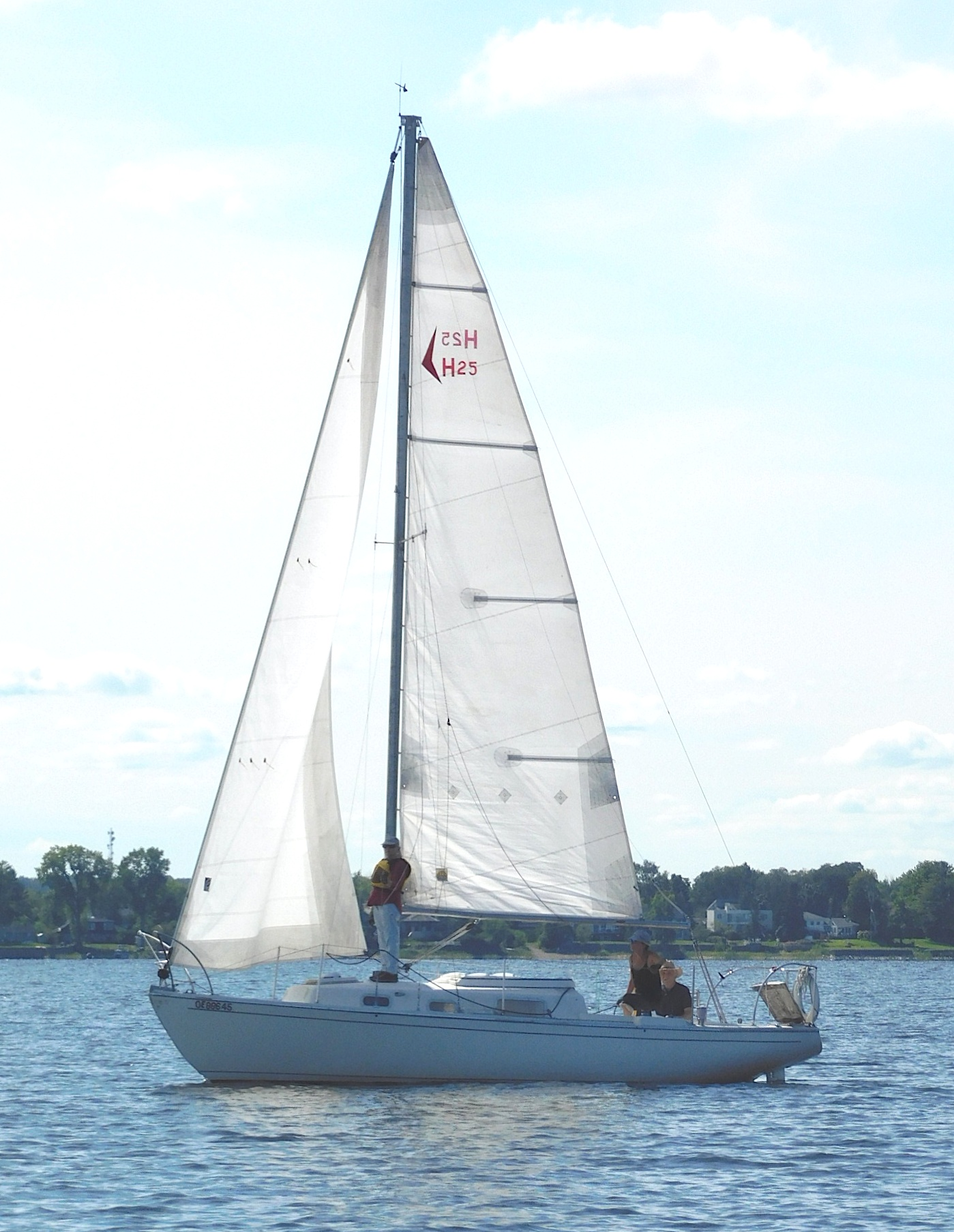
Hughes 25

Hughes Boat Works acquired the tooling and moulds for the Nutmeg 24 from Tanzer Industries and used it to develop the Hughes 24, although it only sold in small numbers. The Hughes 25 is thought to be derived from the same design, with the addition of a fin keel, spade-type rudder and a reverse transom, but retaining Shaw's basic hull shape.

The Hughes 25 is built predominantly of fibreglass, with wood trim. It has a masthead sloop rig, a spooned raked stem, a reverse transom, an internally mounted spade-type rudder controlled by a tiller and a fixed fin keel. It displaces 3,500 lb (1,588 kg) and carries 1,600 lb (726 kg) of ballast.

The boat has a draft of 3.25 ft (0.99 m) with the standard keel, allowing ground transportation on a trailer.

The design has sleeping accommodation for five people, in one of two cabin interior plans. Layout A has a double "V"-berth in the bow cabin, two straight settees in the main cabin and an aft quarter berth on the starboard side, under the cockpit. The galley is located on the port side abeam the companionway ladder and is equipped with a sink. The head is a potable type, located under the bow "V"-berth. Layout B locates the galley forward, in place of the port settee and adds an extra quarter berth on the port side. A forward hatch provides cabin ventilation.

For sailing downwind the design may be equipped with a symmetrical or asymmetrical spinnaker.

The design has a hull speed of 5.84 kn (10.82 km/h).
