= Hughes 48 =

Sailboat class

Development
- Designer: Sparkman & Stephens
- Location: Canada
- Year: 1970
- Builder: Hughes Boat Works
- Role: Cruiser

Boat
- Displacement: 30,000 lb (13,608 kg)
- Draft: 7.00 ft (2.13 m)

Hull
- Type: monohull
- Construction: fibreglass
- LOA: 48.00 ft (14.63 m)
- LWL: 33.00 ft (10.06 m)
- Beam: 11.83 ft (3.61 m)
- Engine: inboard motor

Hull appendages
- Keel: fin keel
- Ballast: 15,700 lb (7,121 kg)
- Rudder: skeg-mounted rudder

Rig
- Rig type: Bermuda rig
- I foretriangle height: 54.50 ft (16.61 m)
- J foretriangle base: 18.33 ft (5.59 m)
- P mainsail luff: 48.10 ft (14.66 m)
- E mainsail foot: 18.04 ft (5.50 m)

Sails
- Sailplan: masthead yawl
- Mainsail area: 433.86 sq ft (40.307 m^{2})
- Jib/genoa area: 499.49 sq ft (46.404 m^{2})
- Total sail area: 933.35 sq ft (86.711 m^{2})

The Hughes 48, also sold as the North Star 48, is a Canadian sailboat that was designed by Sparkman & Stephens as a cruiser and first built in 1970. The boat is Sparkman & Stephens' design of 1956.

The Hughes 48 is a development of the Seafarer 48, which had been built by Seafarer Yachts on Long Island, New York. Fewer than five boats were built by Seafarer before production ended.

== Production ==
The design was built by Hughes Boat Works in Canada, starting in 1970, but it is now out of production. When US Steel bought out Hughes and changed the company name to North Star Yachts the boat was sold as the North Star 48. It is not known how many were produced by Hughes and North Star.

== Design ==
The Hughes 48 is a recreational keelboat, built predominantly of fibreglass, with wood trim. It has a centre cockpit, a masthead yawl rig; a raked stem; a raised counter, angled transom, a skeg-mounted rudder controlled by a wheel and a fixed, swept fin keel. It displaces 30,000 lb (13,608 kg) and carries 15,700 lb (7,121 kg) of lead ballast.

The boat has a draft of 7.00 ft (2.13 m) with the standard keel and is fitted with an inboard engine for docking and manoeuvring.

The design has sleeping accommodation for seven people, with a double "V"-berth in the bow cabin, four settee berths in the main cabin and an aft cabin with a berth on the starboard side. The galley is located on the port side just forward of the companionway ladder. The galley is U-shaped and is equipped with a three-burner stove and a double sink. A navigation station is opposite the galley, on the starboard side. There are two heads, one just aft of the bow cabin on the port side and one on the starboard side in the aft cabin.

For sailing the design may be equipped with one of a number of jibs or genoas.

The design has a hull speed of 7.7 kn (14.3 km/h).

== See also ==
- List of sailing boat types
