= Sun Fast 39 =

Sailboat class

Development
- Designer: Jacques Fauroux
- Location: France
- Year: 1989
- Builder: Jeanneau
- Role: Racer-Cruiser
- Name: Sun Fast 39

Boat
- Displacement: 14,330 lb (6,500 kg)
- Draft: 6.40 ft (1.95 m)

Hull
- Type: monohull
- Construction: fiberglass
- LOA: 38.93 ft (11.87 m)
- LWL: 32.38 ft (9.87 m)
- Beam: 12.76 ft (3.89 m)
- Engine: Inboard motor

Hull appendages
- Keel: fin keel
- Ballast: 5,401 lb (2,450 kg)
- Rudder: spade-type rudder

Rig
- Rig type: Bermuda rig
- I foretriangle height: 47.90 ft (14.60 m)
- J foretriangle base: 14.83 ft (4.52 m)
- P mainsail luff: 50.20 ft (15.30 m)
- E mainsail foot: 15.09 ft (4.60 m)

Sails
- Sailplan: fractional rigged sloop
- Mainsail area: 378.76 sq ft (35.188 m^{2})
- Jib/genoa area: 355.18 sq ft (32.997 m^{2})
- Total sail area: 733.94 sq ft (68.185 m^{2})

The Sun Fast 39 is a French sailboat that was designed by Jacques Fauroux as a racer-cruiser and first built in 1989.

The Sun Fast 39 is a development of the more cruising-oriented Sun Charm 39 of 1988. The design was developed into the cruising Sun Odyssey 39 in 1990.

== Production ==
The design was built by Jeanneau in France, starting in 1989, but it is now out of production.

== Design ==
The Sun Fast 39 is a racing keelboat, built predominantly of fiberglass, with wood trim. It has a fractional sloop rig. The hull has a raked stem, a step-down reverse transom with a swimming platform, an internally mounted spade-type rudder controlled by a wheel and a fixed fin keel. It displaces 14,330 lb (6,500 kg) and carries 5,401 lb (2,450 kg) of ballast.

The boat has a draft of 6.40 ft (1.95 m) with the standard keel.

The boat is fitted with a British inboard engine for docking and maneuvering. The fuel tank holds 37 U.S. gallons (140 L; 31 imp gal) and the fresh water tank has a capacity of 95 U.S. gallons (360 L; 79 imp gal).

The design has sleeping accommodation for six people, with a double "V"-berth in the bow cabin and two aft cabins with a double berth in each. The galley is located on the starboard side, amidships and opposite the U-shaped settee and the dining table. The galley is equipped with a two-burner stove, an ice box and a double sink. A navigation station is aft of the galley, on the starboard side. There are two heads, one just forward of each aft cabin.

The design has a hull speed of 7.63 kn (14.13 km/h).

== See also ==
- List of sailing boat types
