= Hughes 38-1 =

Sailboat class

Development
- Designer: Sparkman & Stephens
- Location: Canada
- Year: 1967
- Builder: Hughes Boat Works
- Role: Cruiser-Racer
- Name: Hughes 38-1

Boat
- Displacement: 12,700 lb (5,761 kg)
- Draft: 6.00 ft (1.83 m)

Hull
- Type: monohull
- Construction: fibreglass
- LOA: 37.82 ft (11.53 m)
- LWL: 27.00 ft (8.23 m)
- Beam: 10.17 ft (3.10 m)
- Engine: Universal Atomic 4 gasoline engine

Hull appendages
- Keel: fin keel
- Ballast: 6,100 lb (2,767 kg)
- Rudder: skeg-mounted rudder

Rig
- Rig type: Bermuda rig
- I foretriangle height: 43.50 ft (13.26 m)
- J foretriangle base: 14.50 ft (4.42 m)
- P mainsail luff: 39.20 ft (11.95 m)
- E mainsail foot: 13.70 ft (4.18 m)

Sails
- Sailplan: masthead sloop
- Mainsail area: 268.52 sq ft (24.946 m^{2})
- Jib/genoa area: 315.38 sq ft (29.300 m^{2})
- Total sail area: 583.90 sq ft (54.246 m^{2})

The Hughes 38-1 or Hughes 38 Mark I, is a Canadian sailboat that was designed by Sparkman & Stephens as a cruiser-racer and first built in 1967. It is Sparkman & Stephens design number 1903.

The design was originally marketed by the manufacturer as the Hughes 38, but is now usually referred to as the Hughes 38-1 or Mark I to differentiate it from the later 1970 Hughes 38-2 and 1977 Hughes 38-3 designs.

== Production ==
The design was built by Hughes Boat Works in Canada, from 1967 until 1969, but it is now out of production.

Some hulls were also built by Hughes and sold to Hinckley Yachts of Southwest Harbor, Maine. These hulls were then fitted with a new deck design built by Hinckley and marketed as the Hinckley 38.

== Design ==
The Hughes 38-1 is a recreational keelboat, built predominantly of fibreglass, with wood trim. It has a masthead sloop rig; a raked stem; a raised counter, reverse transom; a skeg-mounted rudder controlled by a tiller and a fixed fin keel. It displaces 12,700 lb (5,761 kg) and carries 6,100 lb (2,767 kg) of lead ballast.

The boat has a draft of 6.00 ft (1.83 m) with the standard swept fin keel.

The boat is fitted with a Universal Atomic 4 gasoline engine for docking and manoeuvring, although a diesel engine was available as a factory option. The fuel tank holds 12 U.S. gallons (45 L; 10.0 imp gal) and the fresh water tank has a capacity of 40 U.S. gallons (150 L; 33 imp gal).

The design has sleeping accommodation for seven people, with a double "V"-berth in the bow cabin, a straight settee and a drop-down dinette table that forms a double berth in the main cabin and two aft quarter berths. The galley is located on the starboard side just forward of the companionway ladder. The galley is equipped with a two-burner stove and a sink, plus an ice box under the companionway steps. A navigation station is opposite the galley, on the port side. The head is located just aft of the bow cabin on the port side and includes a shower.

For sailing, the design may be equipped with one of a series of jibs or genoas.

The design has a hull speed of 6.96 kn (12.89 km/h).

== See also ==
- List of sailing boat types
