= Columbia 8.3 =

Sailboat class

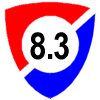

Development
- Designer: Alan Payne
- Location: United States/Canada
- Year: 1976
- No. built: 240
- Builders: Columbia Yachts; Hughes Boat Works
- Role: Cruiser

Boat
- Displacement: 7,300 lb (3,311 kg)
- Draft: 4.33 ft (1.32 m)

Hull
- Type: monohull
- Construction: fibreglass
- LOA: 27.08 ft (8.25 m)
- LWL: 21.25 ft (6.48 m)
- Beam: 9.25 ft (2.82 m)
- Engine: Universal Atomic 4 30 hp (22 kW) gasoline engine

Hull appendages
- Keel: fin keel
- Ballast: 3,100 lb (1,406 kg)
- Rudder: internally-mounted spade-type rudder

Rig
- Rig type: Bermuda rig
- I foretriangle height: 34.80 ft (10.61 m)
- J foretriangle base: 11.90 ft (3.63 m)
- P mainsail luff: 29.50 ft (8.99 m)
- E mainsail foot: 9.30 ft (2.83 m)

Sails
- Sailplan: masthead sloop
- Mainsail area: 137.18 sq ft (12.744 m^{2})
- Jib/genoa area: 207.06 sq ft (19.237 m^{2})
- Total sail area: 344.24 sq ft (31.981 m^{2})

The Columbia 8.3 is a sailboat that was designed by Alan Payne as a cruiser and first built in 1976.

The Columbia 8.3 design was also sold as the Hughes 27 and was later developed into the Hughes-Columbia 27.

== Production ==
The design was built by Columbia Yachts in the United States and later by Hughes Boat Works in Canada after Howard Hughes bought Columbia Yachts. Production ran from 1976 until 1981, with 240 boats built.

== Design ==
The designer described the Columbia 8.3's cruising design criteria, hull shape and sailing characteristics:

There has always been the thing that cruising yachts were a kind of watered-down version of current racing yachts. The amount of design thought that has gone into cruising yachts was nowhere near what it should have been. The Super-Cruiser design is intended to be a balance of good handling qualities, safety and ability in rough weather and speed. The interesting and special thing about this design is the very good performance which has been achieved over the whole range of cruising requirements.

The final satisfactory result was achieved by combining a wide beam, a flat-bottomed shape amidships with firm bilges, and bow and stern shapes which are different to the shapes adopted nowadays in rather thoughtless imitation of shapes which have been developed to fit the geometry of racing rule.

The bow shape has been chosen principally for its effect on steering. The U-shape reduces weather helm when the Yacht is heeled and makes the boat much easier to steer in a following sea. On top of the veed stern there is a fairly wide spreading out transom in the style of the early American yachts like the schooner 'America'. This stern confers usable deck space and acts as a very good pitch dampening device when the yacht is heeled over.

The net result of the bow, midships, and stern shapes is a boat which imparts tremendous confidence in rough weather. It keeps going fast, it has an easy motion, it is dry, and it is easy to steer. It is also stiff and stable and carries its sail well. It is a boat with which the owner can go on board and find that she is particularly easy to manage in all sailing conditions.

The Columbia 8.3 is a recreational keelboat, built predominantly of fibreglass, with wood trim. It has a masthead sloop rig, a raked stem, a slightly angled transom, an internally mounted spade-type rudder controlled by a tiller and a fixed fin keel. It displaces 7,300 lb (3,311 kg) and carries 3,100 lb (1,406 kg) of ballast.

The boat has a draft of 4.33 ft (1.32 m) with the standard keel.

The boat is fitted with a direct drive 30 hp (22 kW) Universal Atomic 4 gasoline engine for docking and manoeuvring. A 13 hp (10 kW) Swedish Volvo Penta geared diesel engine was available as a factory option. The fuel tank holds 20 U.S. gallons (76 L; 17 imp gal) and the fresh water tank has a capacity of 30 U.S. gallons (110 L; 25 imp gal).

The design has sleeping accommodation for four people, with a double "V"-berth in the bow cabin and two straight settee berths in the main cabin. The galley is located on both sides of the companionway ladder and is equipped with a two-burner stove to port and a sink and icebox to starboard. The head is located just aft of the bow cabin on the port side. Cabin headroom is 73 in (185 cm).

For sailing downwind the design may be equipped with a spinnaker.

The design has a hull speed of 6.18 kn (11.45 km/h).

== See also ==
- List of sailing boat types
