= Hughes 29 =

1970s Canadian recreational keelboat

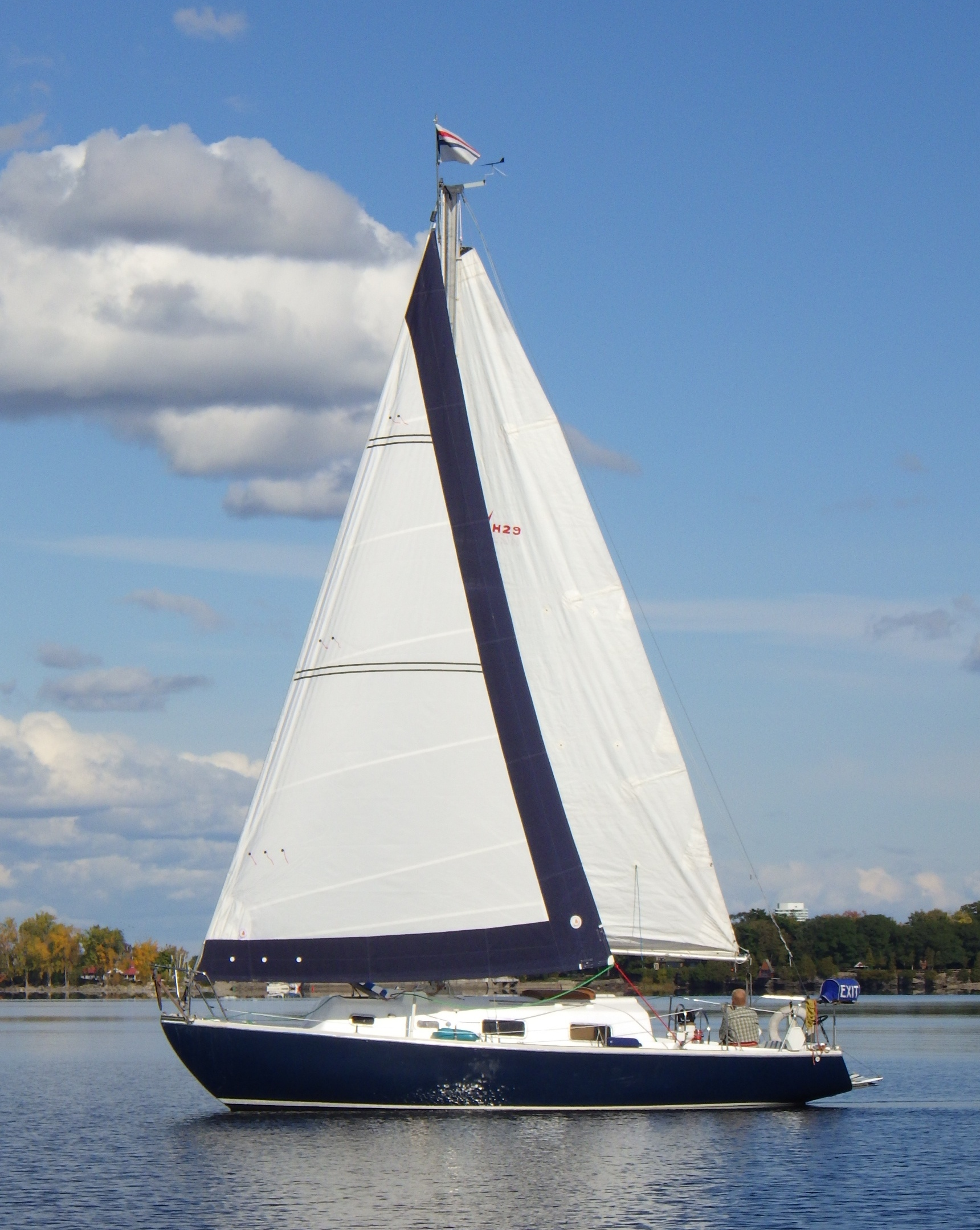

Development
- Designer: Howard Hughes
- Location: Canada
- Year: 1975
- No. built: about 190
- Builder: Hughes Boat Works
- Role: Cruiser
- Name: Hughes 29

Boat
- Displacement: 6,500 lb (2,948 kg)
- Draft: 4.50 ft (1.37 m)

Hull
- Type: monohull
- Construction: fibreglass
- LOA: 29.33 ft (8.94 m)
- LWL: 23.00 ft (7.01 m)
- Beam: 8.17 ft (2.49 m)
- Engine: Universal Atomic 4 gasoline engine

Hull appendages
- Keel: fin keel
- Ballast: 3,000 lb (1,361 kg)
- Rudder: internally-mounted spade-type rudder

Rig
- Rig type: Bermuda rig
- I foretriangle height: 33.30 ft (10.15 m)
- J foretriangle base: 11.00 ft (3.35 m)
- P mainsail luff: 30.20 ft (9.20 m)
- E mainsail foot: 11.00 ft (3.35 m)

Sails
- Sailplan: masthead sloop
- Mainsail area: 166.10 sq ft (15.431 m^{2})
- Jib/genoa area: 183.15 sq ft (17.015 m^{2})
- Total sail area: 349.25 sq ft (32.446 m^{2})

The Hughes 29 is a Canadian sailboat that was designed by Howard Hughes as a cruiser and first built in 1975.

== Production ==
The design was built by Hughes Boat Works in Huron Park, Ontario, Canada, starting in 1975, with about 190 boats completed, but it is now out of production.

== Design ==
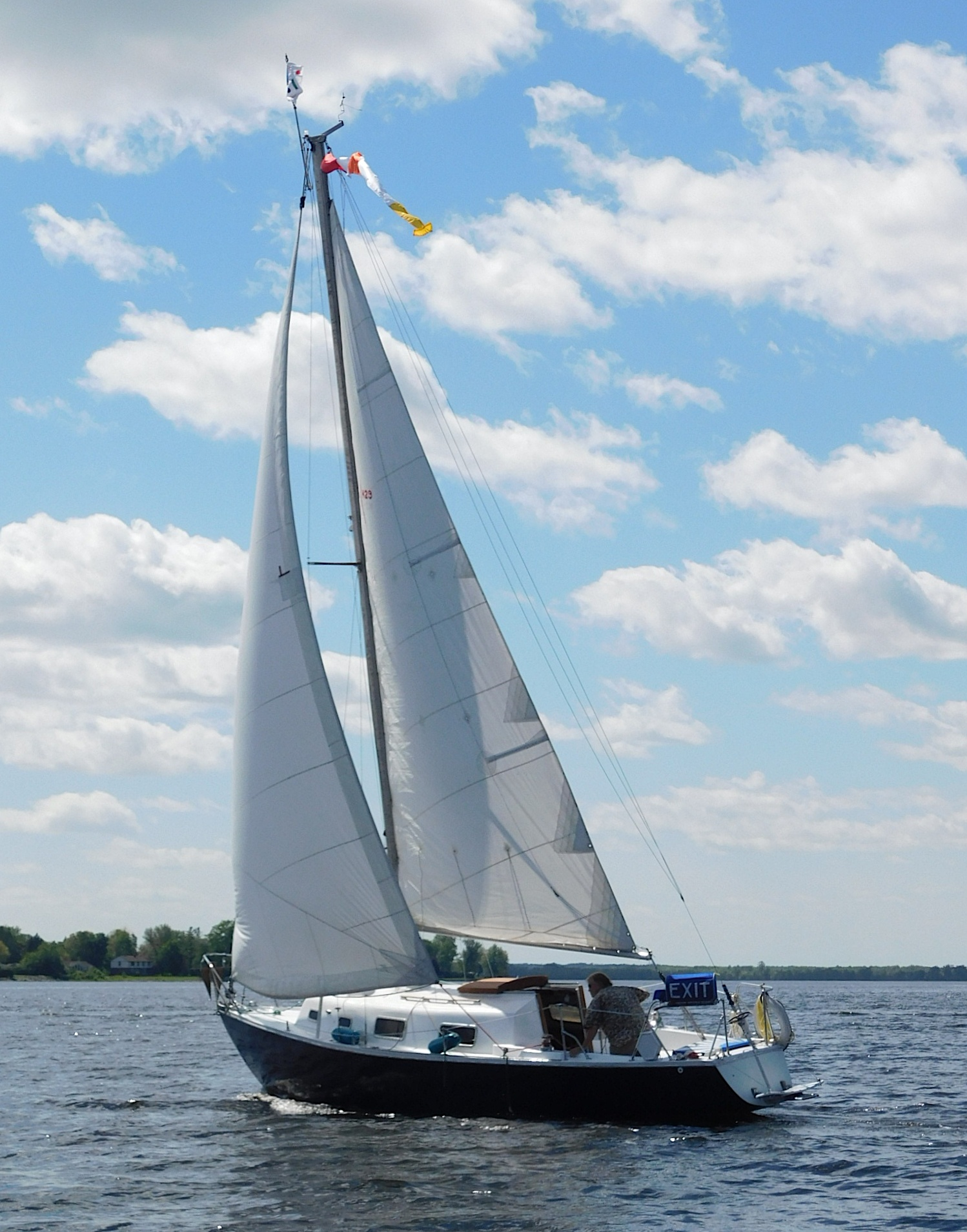
Hughes 29, showing transom shape

The Hughes 29 is a recreational keelboat, built predominantly of fibreglass, with wood trim. It has a masthead sloop rig; a raked stem; a raised counter, reverse transom; an internally mounted spade-type rudder controlled by a wheel and a fixed, swept fin keel. It displaces 6,500 lb (2,948 kg) and carries 3,000 lb (1,361 kg) of ballast.

The boat has a draft of 4.50 ft (1.37 m) with the standard keel.

The boat is fitted with a Universal Atomic 4 gasoline engine for docking and manoeuvring. The fuel tank holds 12 U.S. gallons (45 L; 10.0 imp gal) and the fresh water tank has a capacity of 12 U.S. gallons (45 L; 10.0 imp gal).

The design has sleeping accommodation for six people, with a double "V"-berth in the bow cabin, a drop dinette table in the main cabin and two aft cabins. The galley is located on the starboard side just forward of the companionway ladder. The head is located just aft of the bow cabin on the port side.

The design has a hull speed of 6.43 kn (11.91 km/h).

== Operational history ==
The boat is supported by a class club, the Hughes 29 Site.
