= Weekender 24 =

1960s American recreational keelboat

Development
- Designer: Sparkman & Stephens
- Location: United States
- Year: 1965
- No. built: 60
- Builder: Tidewater Boats
- Role: Cruiser
- Name: Weekender 24

Boat
- Displacement: 2,060 lb (934 kg)
- Draft: 3.50 ft (1.07 m)

Hull
- Type: monohull
- Construction: fiberglass
- LOA: 24.17 ft (7.37 m)
- LWL: 17.25 ft (5.26 m)
- Beam: 6.25 ft (1.91 m)
- Engine: outboard motor

Hull appendages
- Keel: fin keel
- Ballast: 1,120 lb (508 kg)
- Rudder: internally-mounted spade-type rudder

Rig
- Rig type: Bermuda rig

Sails
- Sailplan: masthead sloop
- Total sail area: 218 sq ft (20.3 m^{2})

Racing
- PHRF: 276

The Weekender 24 is a keelboat built by Tidewater Boats, near Annapolis, Maryland. From 1965 to 1977, 60 were built.

It is Sparkman & Stephens' design number 1701-C1, a development of design 1701, the Rainbow 24, with a full cabin replacing the cuddy cabin.

The fiberglass hull has a spooned, raked stem; a raised counter, angled transom with a lazarette; an internally mounted spade-type rudder controlled by a tiller; a self-bailing cockpit and a fixed fin keel. The design has a PHRF racing average handicap of 276 and a hull speed of 5.7 kn (10.6 km/h). In a 2010 review Steve Henkel wrote "the boat is about as stiff as she can be."

It has a masthead sloop rig and may be equipped with either a jib or a genoa foresail.

The design has sleeping accommodation for four people, with a double "V"-berth in the bow cabin and two straight settees in the main cabin. The galley is located on both sides just aft of the bow cabin. The galley is equipped with an icebox on the port side and a sink on the starboard side. The head is located under the bow cabin berths. Cabin headroom is 50 in (130 cm).
