= Designers Choice =

Sailboat class

- Class symbol

Development
- Designer: Sparkman & Stephens
- Location: United States
- Year: 1978
- No. built: 1500
- Builder: Howmar Boats
- Role: Sailing dinghy
- Name: Designers Choice

Boat
- Displacement: 315 lb (143 kg)
- Draft: 3.00 ft (0.91 m) with the centerboard down

Hull
- Type: Monohull
- Construction: Fiberglass
- LOA: 14.87 ft (4.53 m)
- LWL: 12.75 ft (3.89 m)
- Beam: 6.08 ft (1.85 m)

Hull appendages
- Keel: centerboard
- Rudder: transom-mounted rudder

Rig
- Rig type: Bermuda rig

Sails
- Sailplan: Fractional rigged sloop
- Mainsail area: 82 sq ft (7.6 m^{2})
- Jib/genoa area: 38 sq ft (3.5 m^{2})
- Total sail area: 120 sq ft (11 m^{2})

Racing
- D-PN: 101.3

The Designers Choice is an American sailing dinghy that was designed by Sparkman & Stephens as a sail training and racing boat and first built in 1978. It was Sparkman & Stephens' design #2349.

The Designers Choice was later developed into the Shadow, by making the cockpit longer and deeper and adding internal seating.

== Production ==
The design was built by Howmar Boats in the United States starting in 1978. A total of 1,500 boats were produced, but the company went out of business in 1983 and the boat went out of production at that time.

== Design ==
The Designers Choice is a recreational sailboat, built predominantly of fiberglass. The hull design is flat aft, so the boat will plane. It has a fractional sloop rig with anodized aluminum spars and a loose-footed mainsail. The hull has a slightly raked stem, a vertical transom, a transom-hung, kick-up rudder controlled by a tiller and a retractable centerboard. The forward part of the boat is open, without a foredeck. The aft deck includes a small stowage locker. The cockpit is self-draining. The boat displaces 315 lb (143 kg).

The boat has a draft of 3.00 ft (0.91 m) with the centerboard extended and 5 in (13 cm) with it retracted, allowing beaching or ground transportation on a trailer.

For sailing the design is equipped with an outhaul, boom vang, a Cunningham and a jib window. It is also fitted with foam flotation for buoyancy, hiking straps and may also be optionally equipped with a spinnaker for sailing downwind.

The boat may be fitted with a small outboard motor for docking and maneuvering.

The design has a Portsmouth Yardstick racing average handicap of 101.3 and is raced with a maximum crew weight of 900 lb (408 kg).

== Operational history ==
In a 1994 review Richard Sherwood wrote, "this is a combination boat, meant for training, racing, or general sailing. The Designers Choice has curved sections forward and is relatively dry. With flat surfaces aft, she planes."

== See also ==
- List of sailing boat types
