= Hughes 24 =

Sailboat class

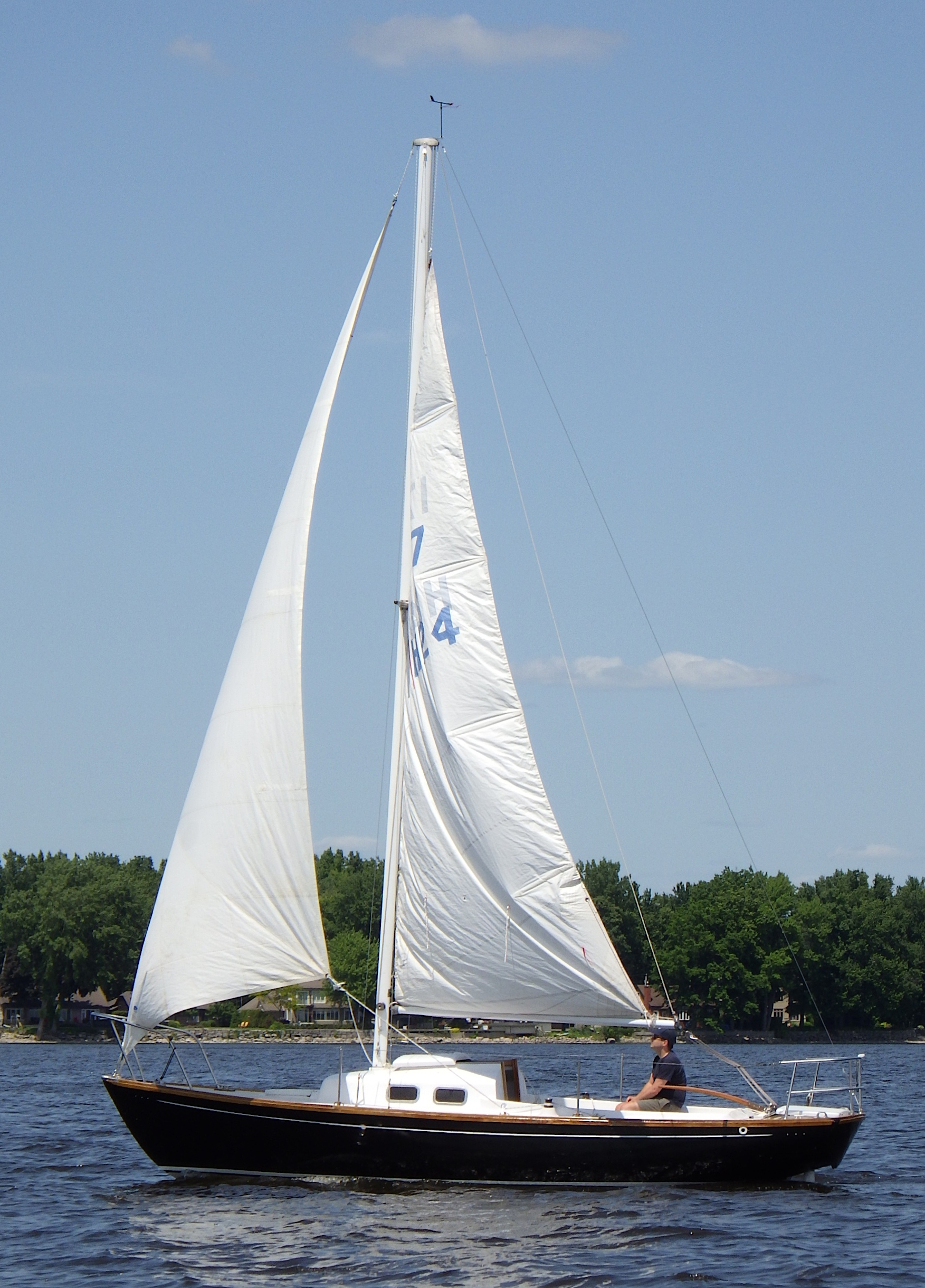

Development
- Designer: William Shaw
- Location: Canada
- Year: 1966
- Builder: Hughes Boat Works
- Role: Cruiser
- Name: Hughes 24

Boat
- Displacement: 3,800 lb (1,724 kg)
- Draft: 5.25 ft (1.60 m) with centreboard down

Hull
- Type: monohull
- Construction: fibreglass
- LOA: 24.50 ft (7.47 m)
- LWL: 18.50 ft (5.64 m)
- Beam: 7.58 ft (2.31 m)

Hull appendages
- Keel: stub keel and centreboard
- Ballast: 1,475 lb (669 kg)

Rig
- Rig type: Bermuda rig
- I foretriangle height: 28.50 ft (8.69 m)
- J foretriangle base: 8.83 ft (2.69 m)
- P mainsail luff: 24.75 ft (7.54 m)
- E mainsail foot: 11.50 ft (3.51 m)

Sails
- Sailplan: masthead sloop
- Mainsail area: 142.31 sq ft (13.221 m^{2})
- Jib/genoa area: 125.83 sq ft (11.690 m^{2})
- Total sail area: 268.14 sq ft (24.911 m^{2})

The Hughes 24 is a Canadian trailerable sailboat that was designed by William Shaw as a cruiser and first built in 1966.

The boat is a development of Shaw's Nutmeg 24 design, which was built by Tanzer Industries and was likely built from the same moulds.

The design was developed into the much more commercially successful Hughes 25 in 1968, likely by modifying the existing moulds.

== Production ==
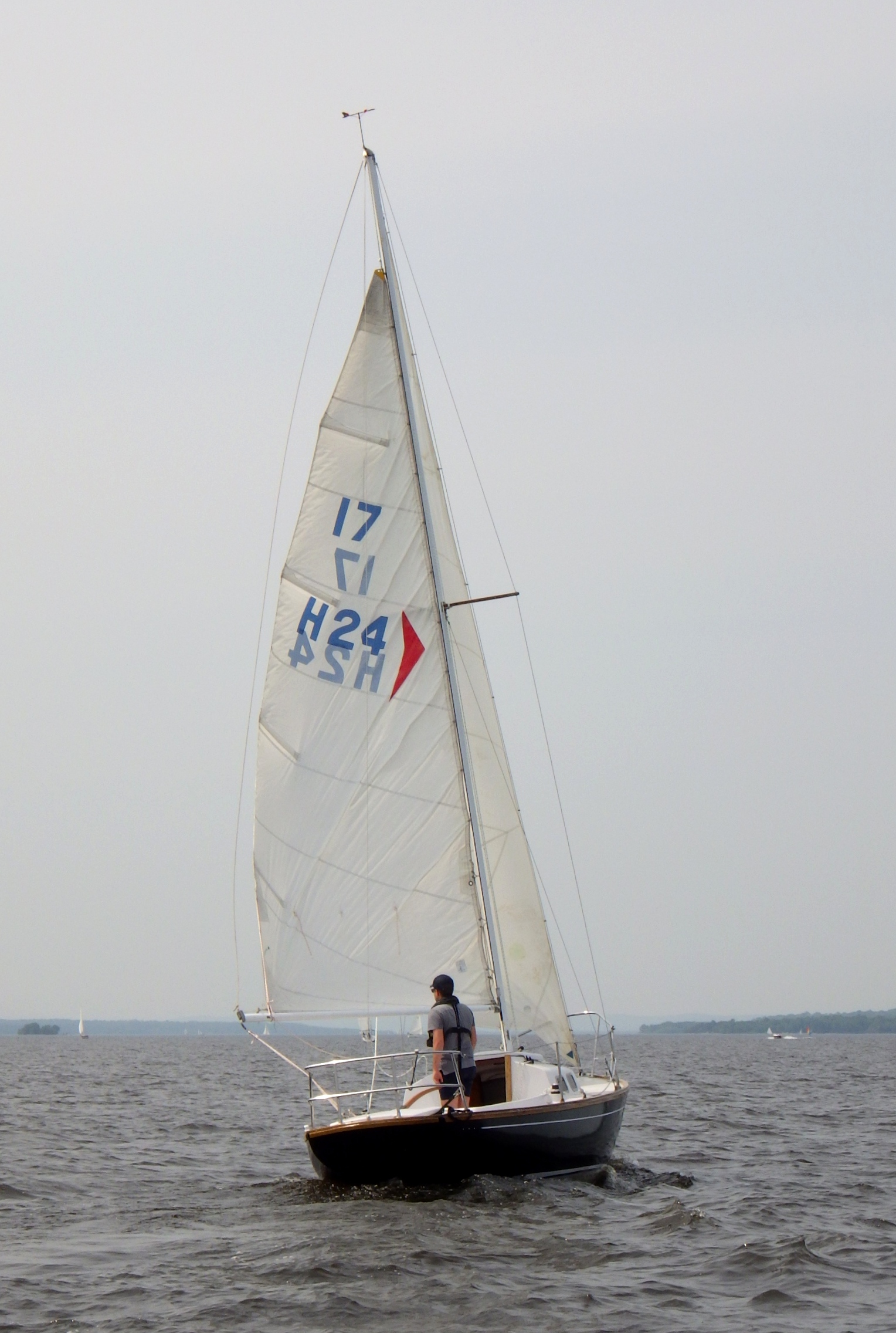
Hughes 24 showing the transom and reefed mainsail.

The design was built by Hughes Boat Works in Canada, starting as a 1966 model year and was in fact their first keelboat design built in the new factory in Scarborough, Ontario. It was only built in small numbers.

== Design ==
The Hughes 24 is a recreational keelboat, built predominantly of fibreglass, with wood trim. It has a masthead sloop rig, a raked stem and a fixed stub keel, with a retractable centreboard. It displaces 3,800 lb (1,724 kg) and carries 1,475 lb (669 kg) of ballast.

The boat has a draft of 5.25 ft (1.60 m) with the centreboard extended and 2.75 ft (0.84 m) with it retracted, allowing operation in shallow water or ground transportation on a trailer.

The design has a hull speed of 5.76 kn (10.67 km/h).
