= North Star 500 =

1970s recreational keelboat

Development
- Designer: Sparkman & Stephens
- Location: Canada
- Year: 1973
- Builder: North Star Yachts
- Role: Racer
- Name: North Star 500

Boat
- Displacement: 4,298 lb (1,950 kg)
- Draft: 5.00 ft (1.52 m)

Hull
- Type: monohull
- Construction: fibreglass
- LOA: 24.98 ft (7.61 m)
- LWL: 20.23 ft (6.17 m)
- Beam: 9.00 ft (2.74 m)
- Engine: Universal Atomic 4 25 hp (19 kW) gasoline engine

Hull appendages
- Keel: fin keel
- Ballast: 1,710 lb (776 kg)
- Rudder: skeg-mounted rudder

Rig
- Rig type: Bermuda rig
- I foretriangle height: 33.00 ft (10.06 m)
- J foretriangle base: 10.25 ft (3.12 m)
- P mainsail luff: 27.50 ft (8.38 m)
- E mainsail foot: 8.75 ft (2.67 m)

Sails
- Sailplan: masthead sloop
- Mainsail area: 120.31 sq ft (11.177 m^{2})
- Jib/genoa area: 169.13 sq ft (15.713 m^{2})
- Total sail area: 289.44 sq ft (26.890 m^{2})

Racing
- PHRF: 228

The North Star 500 is a recreational keelboat that was designed by the American firm of Sparkman & Stephens as an International Offshore Rule Quarter Ton class racer and first built in 1973. The boat was Sparkman & Stephens' design #2135.

The North Star 500 was also built in Finland as the Blue Bird 25.

== Production ==
The design was built by North Star Yachts in Canada starting in 1973, but it is now out of production.

== Design ==
The North Star 500 is built predominantly of fibreglass. It has a masthead sloop rig, a raked stem, a slightly reverse transom, a skeg-mounted rudder controlled by a tiller and a fixed fin keel. It displaces 4,298 lb (1,950 kg) and carries 1,710 lb (776 kg) of ballast.

The boat has a draft of 5.00 ft (1.52 m) with the standard keel.

The boat is fitted with a Universal Atomic 4 25 hp (19 kW) gasoline engine for docking and manoeuvring.

The design has sleeping accommodation for four people. Cabin headroom is 54 in (137 cm).

For sailing downwind the design may be equipped with a symmetrical spinnaker.

The design has a PHRF racing average handicap of 228 and a hull speed of 6.0 kn (11.1 km/h).

== Reception ==
In a 2010 review Steve Henkel wrote, "in 1969, U.S. Steel, anxious to take part in the boom in leisure market goods, bought Hughes Boatworks Ltd. of Centralia, Ontario, Canada, and began selling boats under the North Star Yachts brand name. In 1971, the company contracted with Sparkman & Stephens to design the North Star 500 (25) with the notion of competing in Quarter Ton races. The new design promptly won the quarter ton World Championship. However, production of the boat was discontinued in 1973, perhaps partly because she was a comparatively well built but expensive toy with a single purpose, namely to win quarter ton races. The recession of 1973-1974 also may have been a factor in her demise. Best features: She's a fast quarter tonner. Worst features: The North Star has the least headroom in her comp group, and the deepest draft, both of which limits her utility as a cruising boat. For example, one of her competitors, the C&C 25 ... which came out in 1972, has less draft, more headroom, and a lot more space below, and according to her PHRF rating, may be a faster boat."
