= Hughes 22 =

1970s Canadian recreational keelboat

Development
- Designer: Howard Hughes
- Location: Canada
- Year: 1971
- Builders: Hughes Boatworks; North Star Yachts; Hullmaster Boats
- Role: Cruiser
- Name: Hughes 22

Boat
- Displacement: 2,200 lb (998 kg)
- Draft: 6.00 ft (1.83 m) with centreboard down

Hull
- Type: monohull
- Construction: fibreglass
- LOA: 22.00 ft (6.71 m)
- LWL: 19.60 ft (5.97 m)
- Beam: 7.58 ft (2.31 m)
- Engine: outboard motor

Hull appendages
- Keel: stub keel and centreboard
- Ballast: 835 lb (379 kg)
- Rudder: transom-mounted rudder

Rig
- Rig type: Bermuda rig
- I foretriangle height: 26.58 ft (8.10 m)
- J foretriangle base: 7.92 ft (2.41 m)
- P mainsail luff: 22.00 ft (6.71 m)
- E mainsail foot: 9.50 ft (2.90 m)

Sails
- Sailplan: masthead sloop
- Mainsail area: 104.50 sq ft (9.708 m^{2})
- Jib/genoa area: 105.26 sq ft (9.779 m^{2})
- Total sail area: 209.76 sq ft (19.487 m^{2})

Racing
- PHRF: 282

The Hughes 22 is a recreational keelboat that was designed by Howard Hughes, the co-founder of Hughes Boat Works, as a cruiser and first built in 1971.

The design was also sold as the North Star 22 and the Hullmaster 22.

== Production ==
The design was initially built by Hughes Boat Works in Canada. When the company was sold to US Steel and the name changed to North Star Yachts, the boat was renamed as the North Star 22. It was later built by Hullmaster Boats, also in Canada, as the Hullmaster 22. It may have also been produced under other names, before production ended.

== Design ==
The Hughes 22 is built predominantly of fibreglass, with wooden trim. It has a masthead sloop rig, a raked stem, a plumb transom, a transom-hung rudder controlled by a tiller and a fixed stub keel with a cast itron centreboard. It displaces 2,200 lb (998 kg) and carries 835 lb (379 kg) of iron ballast.

A version of the North Star 22 was also built with a fin keel and a spade-type rudder.

The boat has a draft of 6.00 ft (1.83 m) with the centerboard extended and 1.67 ft (0.51 m) with it retracted, allowing operation in shallow water, or ground transportation on a trailer.

The boat is normally fitted with a small 3 to 6 hp (2 to 4 kW) outboard motor for docking and maneuvering.

The design has sleeping accommodation for five people, with a double "V"-berth in the bow cabin, a straight settee in the main cabin and a drop down dinntte table that coverts to a double berth on the starboard side of the main cabin. The galley is located on the port sideand stows under the cockpit seat. The head is located in the bow cabin on the starboard side under the "V"-berth. Cabin headroom is 60 in (152 cm).

The design has a PHRF racing average handicap of 282 and a hull speed of 5.9 kn (10.9 km/h).

== Reception ==
In a 2010 review Steve Henkel wrote, "best features: Built for entry-level sailors at a price low enough to attract them, the Hughes 22 has little else to recommend it. Worst features: Of the three comp[etitor]s listed together here [the Seaward 22 and Columbia 22], the Hughes 22 is to our taste the least salty looking, with her mismatched portlights and featureless, slab-sided hull. She lacks a forward hatch, carries a cast iron keel rather than a molded lead one, and her accommodations plan shows a portside berth only 18 inches wide (versus the accepted industry absolute minimum of 21 inches), In addition, her offset cabin sole is inappropriate for a boat this small."
