= New Horizons 26 =

1950s US recreational keelboat

Development
- Designer: Sparkman & Stephens
- Location: United States
- Year: 1958
- No. built: 175
- Builder: Ray Greene & Company
- Name: New Horizons 26

Boat
- Displacement: 6,030 lb (2,735 kg)
- Draft: 6.42 ft (1.96 m) with centerboard down

Hull
- Type: monohull
- Construction: fiberglass
- LOA: 25.42 ft (7.75 m)
- LWL: 21.25 ft (6.48 m)
- Beam: 7.75 ft (2.36 m)
- Engine: outboard motor or Universal Atomic 4 25 hp (19 kW) gasoline engine

Hull appendages
- Keel: modified stub long keel with centerboard
- Ballast: 1,600 lb (726 kg)
- Rudder: keel-mounted rudder

Rig
- Rig type: Bermuda rig
- I foretriangle height: 32.30 ft (9.85 m)
- J foretriangle base: 9.80 ft (2.99 m)
- P mainsail luff: 28.80 ft (8.78 m)
- E mainsail foot: 12.10 ft (3.69 m)

Sails
- Sailplan: masthead sloop
- Mainsail area: 174.24 sq ft (16.187 m^{2})
- Jib/genoa area: 158.27 sq ft (14.704 m^{2})
- Total sail area: 332.51 sq ft (30.891 m^{2})

Racing
- PHRF: 225

The New Horizons 26 is a recreational keelboat initially marketed as the New Horizons 25.

== Production ==
The boat was introduced at the New York Boat Show in 1957 and 30 boats were sold at that show, marking it as an instant commercial success for the builder, Ray Greene & Company in Toledo, Ohio, United States. The design was built starting as a 1958 model and running until about 1966, with 175 boats were completed.

The boat was the first Sparkman & Stephens production design especially for construction in fiberglass, which was then a new material for boatbuilding. Green's company was an early adopter of fiberglass construction.

== Design ==
It was Sparkman & Stephens design #1235. The New Horizons 26 is built predominantly of fiberglass, with wood trim. It has a masthead sloop rig, a raked stem, an angled transom, a keel-mounted rudder controlled by a tiller and a fixed, stub, modified long keel, the retractable centerboard. It displaces 6,030 lb (2,735 kg) and carries 1,600 lb (726 kg) of ballast.

The boat has a draft of 6.42 ft (1.96 m) with the centerboard extended and 3.00 ft (0.91 m) with it retracted, allowing operation in shallow water or ground transportation on a trailer.

The boat was factory-fitted with a Universal Atomic 4 25 hp (19 kW) gasoline engine for docking and maneuvering, but could optionally be fitted with a small 8 to 25 hp (6 to 19 kW) outboard motor. The fuel tank holds 15 U.S. gallons (57 L; 12 imp gal) and the fresh water tank has a capacity of 15 U.S. gallons (57 L; 12 imp gal).

The boat was fitted with a molded fiberglass interior, one of the first boats to have this feature. The design has sleeping accommodation for four people, with a double "V"-berth in the bow cabin and two quarter berths under the cockpit. The galley is located on the starboard side just forward of the companionway ladder. The galley is equipped with a stove and a sink, with an ice box opposite, on the port side. The head is located amidships, on the port side. Cabin headroom is 74 in (188 cm).

The design has a PHRF racing average handicap of 225 and a hull speed of 6.2 kn (11.5 km/h).

== Reception ==
In a 2010 review Steve Henkel wrote, "She initially had reverse sheer ... but in about 1960 the sheer was flattened somewhat for aesthetic reasons. An unusual feature was a dinghy designed for the boat, to be carried on stern davits. When the larger but similar-looking Tartan 27, another S&S design, was introduced in 1961 (3 years after the New Horizons) for nearby Tartan (then known as Douglass & McLeod, in Grand River, OH), it quickly diverted customer interest from the Ray Greene boat, much to Greene's disgust. Best features: The good headroom (over six feet) is unusual for a 25-foot sailboat. We liked the idea of a dinghy in davits, too, but wonder whether it might have been ugly to look at. Worst features: We remember admiring the design of this boat when she first came out, but after owning a Tartan 27, we can see how prospective buyers would switch their allegiances to the Tartan."
