= Sun Charm 39 =

Sailboat class

Development
- Designer: Jacques Fauroux
- Location: France
- Year: 1988
- Builder: Jeanneau
- Role: Cruiser
- Name: Sun Charm 39

Boat
- Displacement: 14,330 lb (6,500 kg)
- Draft: 6.42 ft (1.96 m)

Hull
- Type: monohull
- Construction: fiberglass
- LOA: 39.33 ft (11.99 m)
- LWL: 32.44 ft (9.89 m)
- Beam: 12.75 ft (3.89 m)
- Engine: Yanmar 50 hp (37 kW) diesel engine

Hull appendages
- Keel: fin keel
- Ballast: 5,401 lb (2,450 kg)
- Rudder: spade-type rudder

Rig
- Rig type: Bermuda rig
- I foretriangle height: 50.20 ft (15.30 m)
- J foretriangle base: 15.09 ft (4.60 m)
- P mainsail luff: 44.62 ft (13.60 m)
- E mainsail foot: 13.78 ft (4.20 m)

Sails
- Sailplan: masthead sloop
- Mainsail area: 307.43 sq ft (28.561 m^{2})
- Jib/genoa area: 378.76 sq ft (35.188 m^{2})
- Total sail area: 686.19 sq ft (63.749 m^{2})

The Sun Charm 39 is a French sailboat that was designed by Jacques Fauroux as a cruiser and first built in 1988.

The Sun Charm's basic hull design was developed into the Sun Fast 39 racer in 1989 and the cruising Sun Odyssey 39 in 1990.

== Production ==
The design was built by Jeanneau in France, starting in 1988, but it is now out of production.

== Design ==
The Sun Charm 39 is a recreational keelboat, built predominantly of fiberglass, with wood trim. It has a masthead sloop rig. The hull has a raked stem, a reverse transom with steps to a swimming platform, an internally mounted spade-type rudder controlled by a wheel and a fixed fin keel or optional shoal draft keel. It displaces 14,330 lb (6,500 kg) and carries 5,401 lb (2,450 kg) of ballast.

The boat has a draft of 6.42 ft (1.96 m) with the standard keel and 4.67 ft (1.42 m) with the optional shoal draft keel.

The boat is fitted with a Japanese Yanmar diesel engine of 50 hp (37 kW) for docking and maneuvering. The fuel tank holds 37 U.S. gallons (140 L; 31 imp gal) and the fresh water tank has a capacity of 95 U.S. gallons (360 L; 79 imp gal).

The design has sleeping accommodation for six people, with a double "V"-berth in the bow cabin and two aft cabins, each with a double berth. The main cabin has a U-shaped settee around a rectangular table on the port side. The galley is located on the starboard side amidships. The galley is equipped with a stove, an ice box and a double sink. A navigation station is aft of the galley, on the starboard side. There are two heads, one forward of each aft cabin.

For sailing downwind the design may be equipped with a symmetrical spinnaker.

The design has a hull speed of 7.63 kn (14.13 km/h).

== See also ==
- List of sailing boat types
