= Nutmeg 24 =

Canadian trailerable sailboat

Development
- Designer: William Shaw
- Location: Canada
- Year: 1964
- Builder: Tanzer Industries
- Name: Nutmeg 24

Boat
- Crew: Two
- Draft: 5.25 ft (1.60 m)

Hull
- Type: Masthead sloop
- Construction: Fiberglass
- LOA: 24.50 ft (7.47 m)
- LWL: 18.50 ft (5.64 m)
- Beam: 7.58 ft (2.31 m)

Hull appendages
- Keel: fixed fin keel

Sails
- Mainsail area: 142.31 sq ft (13.221 m^{2})
- Jib/genoa area: 125.83 sq ft (11.690 m^{2})
- Total sail area: 268.14 sq ft (24.911 m^{2})

The Nutmeg 24 is a Canadian trailerable sailboat, that was designed by William Shaw and first built in 1964. The design is out of production.

The Nutmeg 24 was featured in the July 1964 issue of Popular Boating.

== Production ==
Production of the boat was commenced in 1964 by Tanzer Industries of Dorion, Quebec. The company entered bankruptcy in May 1986 and production had ended by then.

Hughes Boat Works of Canada later produced a derivative design, the Hughes 24.

== Design ==
The Nutmeg 24 is based on the earlier Oriental Mercy design of 1955 and also the Shaw 24, both wooden boats.

The Nutmeg 24 is a small recreational keelboat, built predominantly of fiberglass, with wood trim. It has a masthead sloop rig, an internally mounted rudder. It displaces 3,800 lb (1,724 kg) and carries 1,475 lb (669 kg) of lead ballast.

The boat has a long keel, with a retractable centreboard, that gives a draft of 5.25 ft (1.60 m) with the board down and 2.75 ft (0.84 m) with it retracted.

The boat is normally fitted with a small 4 to 6 hp (3 to 4 kW) outboard motor for docking and maneuvering.

The design has sleeping accommodation for four people. Cabin headroom is 51 in (130 cm).

The boat has a hull speed of 5.76 kn (10.67 km/h).

In a 2010 review Steve Henkel wrote, "Best features: The boat has low freeboard and a nice springy sheer, presenting a pretty picture to dockside observers. Worst features: Despite Bill Shaw’s fame engendered by the success of his Shaw 24 in winning MORC races, the Nutmeg never measured up (though maybe it's just that she never got a chance to compete). In any case, for most folks she lacks sufficient cruising space below, and not enough boats were sold to permit organizing a one-design class for club racing."
