= Howmar 12 =

Sailboat class

Development
- Designer: Craig V. Walters of Sparkman & Stephens
- Location: United States
- Year: 1983
- No. built: 200
- Builders: Howmar Boats; The New Howmar Boats Corp
- Role: Sailing dinghy

Boat
- Displacement: 175 lb (79 kg)
- Draft: 2.50 ft (0.76 m) with centerboard down

Hull
- Type: Monohull
- Construction: Fiberglass
- LOA: 12.17 ft (3.71 m)
- LWL: 10.42 ft (3.18 m)
- Beam: 5.00 ft (1.52 m)

Hull appendages
- Keel: centerboard
- Rudder: transom-mounted rudder

Rig
- Rig type: Bermuda rig

Sails
- Sailplan: Fractional rigged sloop
- Mainsail area: 60.00 sq ft (5.574 m^{2})
- Jib/genoa area: 30.00 sq ft (2.787 m^{2})
- Spinnaker area: 86.00 sq ft (7.990 m^{2})
- Total sail area: 90.00 sq ft (8.361 m^{2})

The Howmar 12, sometimes written Howmar Twelve, is an American sailing dinghy that was designed by Craig V. Walters of Sparkman & Stephens as a one-design racer, trainer and day sailer and first built in 1983.

== Production ==
The design was Sparkman & Stephens' design #2405. It was built by Howmar Boats Inc. and its successor company, The New Howmar Boats Corp, in the United States, starting in 1983. A total of 200 boats were completed, but it is now out of production.

== Design ==
The Howmar 12 is a recreational sailboat, built predominantly of fiberglass, with wood trim and foam flotation. It has a fractional sloop with anodized aluminum spars and a loose-footed mainsail, with an adjustable outhaul. The hull features a nearly plumb stem, a vertical transom, a transom-hung rudder controlled by a tiller and a retractable centerboard. Both the centerboard and rudder are made from polyurethane. The boat displaces 175 lb (79 kg) and is self-bailing.

The boat has a draft of 2.50 ft (0.76 m) with the centerboard extended and 0.33 ft (0.10 m) with it retracted, allowing beaching or ground transportation on a trailer or car roof rack.

The design's sharp prow is intended to cut though waves and the design is capable of planing. It incorporates dry storage in a bow compartment.

Factory options included a boom vang, a hinged mast step, hiking straps and a mount for an outboard motor.

== Operational history ==
In a 1994 review Richard Sherwood wrote, "roomy for its size, the Howmar Twelve is a racer, trainer, and day sailer. The hull’s light weight makes for easy cartopping."

== See also ==
- List of sailing boat types
