= Hughes-Columbia 27 =

Sailboat class

Development
- Designer: Alan Payne
- Location: Canada
- Year: 1978
- Builder: Hughes Boat Works
- Role: Cruiser
- Name: Hughes-Columbia 27

Boat
- Displacement: 7,300 lb (3,311 kg)
- Draft: 4.00 ft (1.22 m)

Hull
- Type: monohull
- Construction: fibreglass
- LOA: 27.00 ft (8.23 m)
- LWL: 21.25 ft (6.48 m)
- Beam: 9.33 ft (2.84 m)
- Engine: Yanmar 2QM diesel engine

Hull appendages
- Keel: fin keel
- Ballast: 3,100 lb (1,406 kg)
- Rudder: internally-mounted spade-type rudder

Rig
- Rig type: Bermuda rig

Sails
- Sailplan: masthead sloop
- Total sail area: 345.00 sq ft (32.052 m^{2})

The Hughes-Columbia 27 is a Canadian sailboat that was designed by Alan Payne as a cruiser and first built in 1978.

The Hughes-Columbia 27 is a development of the 1976, Payne-designed Columbia 8.3.

== Production ==
The design was built by Hughes Boat Works in Canada, from 1978 until 1980, but it is now out of production.

== Design ==
The Hughes-Columbia 27 is a recreational keelboat, built predominantly of fibreglass, with wood trim. It has a masthead sloop rig, an internally mounted spade-type rudder and a fixed fin keel. It displaces 7,300 lb (3,311 kg) and carries 3,100 lb (1,406 kg) of iron ballast.

The boat has a draft of 4.00 ft (1.22 m) with the standard keel.

The boat is fitted with a Japanese Yanmar 2QM diesel engine for docking and manoeuvring. The fuel tank holds 22 U.S. gallons (83 L; 18 imp gal) and the fresh water tank has a capacity of 90 U.S. gallons (340 L; 75 imp gal).

The design has a hull speed of 6.18 kn (11.45 km/h).

== See also ==
- List of sailing boat types
