= Hughes Boat Works =

Sailboat builder

- Company type: Privately held company
- Industry: Boat building
- Founded: 1963
- Founder: Howard and Peter Hughes
- Defunct: 1991
- Headquarters: Centralia, Ontario, Canada
- Products: Sailboats
- Subsidiaries: Columbia Yachts

Hughes Boat Works was a Canadian boat builder based in Centralia, Ontario. The company specialized in the design and manufacture of fibreglass sailboats.

The company was founded by brothers Howard and Peter Hughes in 1963 and closed in 1991. Howard Hughes was not the American pilot and engineer of the same name.

The company grew to become the largest sailboat manufacturer in Canada.

The company was also known as North Star Yachts Limited and later, Hughes Boatworks Inc.

== History ==
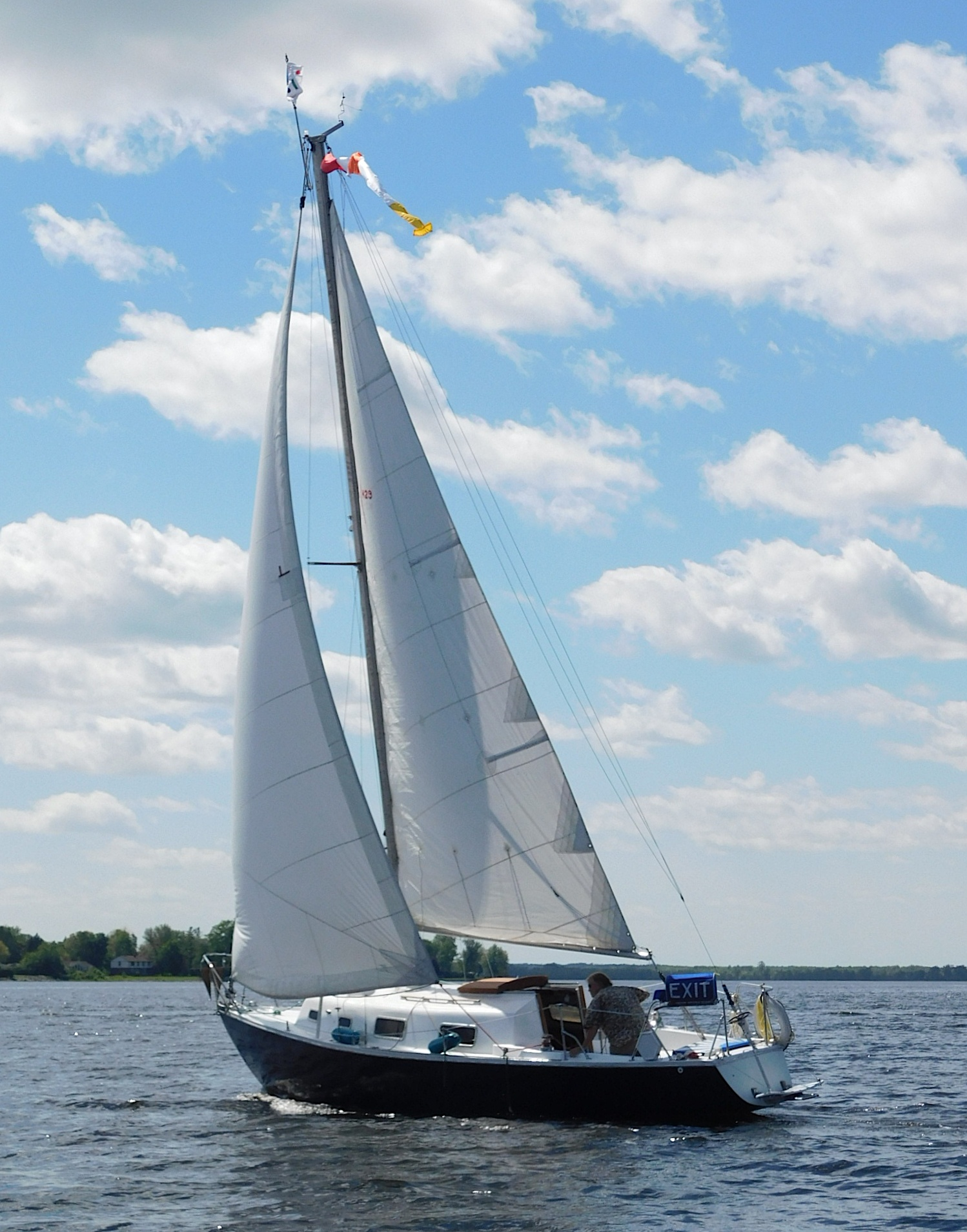
Hughes 29

The Hughes brothers formed the company initially in Willowdale, Ontario, as a builder of dinghies. Two years later, in 1965, the company was relocated to Scarborough, Ontario where they built the Hughes 24 keelboat between 1965 and 1967. The Hughes 24 used tooling and moulds purchased from Tanzer Industries. Also built during this period were the Hughes 27 and Hughes 38-1. The former was a Howard Hughes design while the latter was designed by Sparkman & Stephens in conjunction with Hughes.

In 1968 the company moved away from the Toronto area to southwestern Ontario and the town of Centralia, Ontario. After moving, the company started building the Howard Hughes-designed Hughes 22, Hughes 25 and Hughes 29, as well as the Sparkman & Stephens' designed Hughes 38-1 and Hughes 48 keelboats.

Between 1968 and 1970, the company also produced 28 Hughes 38-1 hulls that were sold to Hinckley Yachts in Southwest Harbor, Maine, where the decks were added, the boats completed and sold as the Hinckley 38.

In 1969 the company was sold to the United States Steel Corporation which changed the name to North Star Yachts Limited. Both Hughes brothers stayed on with the company for a two-year transition period.

The renamed company produced boats under the North Star name. Between 1971 and 1974 the Hughes 22 continued in production as the North Star 22. Also produced were a line of Sparkman & Stephens' designs, including the North Star 500, North Star 1000, North Star 1500, North Star 38 and the North Star 80/20. The company also built the Bruce Farr-designed North Star 727 and North Star 900 starting in 1973.

In 1977 US Steel entered receivership and the appointed receiver offered the assets of the bankrupt company's North Star Yachts division to the former owners. Howard Hughes bought the company back in 1977 and renamed it Hughes Boatworks Inc, changing the boat design names back to Hughes. The Hughes 26 was derived from the North Star 600. The North Star 1000 received an extended transom, as well as increased beam and was renamed the Hughes 31. The North Star 1500 became the Hughes 35 and the North Star 38 had its interior redesigned and was renamed the Hughes 38-2. The North Star 80/20 became the Hughes 40. A new model, the Hughes 27 was also introduced. The North Star 35 design was modified by Coronado Yachts and sold by that company as the Coronado 36.

Hughes purchased the US company Columbia Yachts in 1979 and moved production to his facility in Huron Park, Ontario. The Columbia lines of sailboats were renamed as Hughes-Columbia and were produced in addition to the Hughes sailboat line. Boats were produced finished and ready-to-sail, or as kits for builder completion. New models introduced under the Hughes-Columbia brand included the Hughes-Columbia 36, 8.3, 8.7, 10.7, 11.8, 42 and 48.

During this period the company was the largest builder of sailboats in Canada.

In 1980 the company entered receivership and production ended when the factory was shut down.

The Columbia Yachts division was sold to Aura Yachts, another boat builder in the same location. Aura went on to build versions of many of the Hughes' designs under their own brand name.

Some of the designs were also built in the United Kingdom by South Hants Engineering.

Hughes bought the company back once again in 1986, this time locating it in Orangeville, Ontario, north of Toronto. The company advertised a new model, the Hughes 41 for sale in this period.

In 1991 the factory was destroyed by fire and that marked the end of the company and along with it production of the Hughes and the Columbia lines of sailboats.

== Boats ==
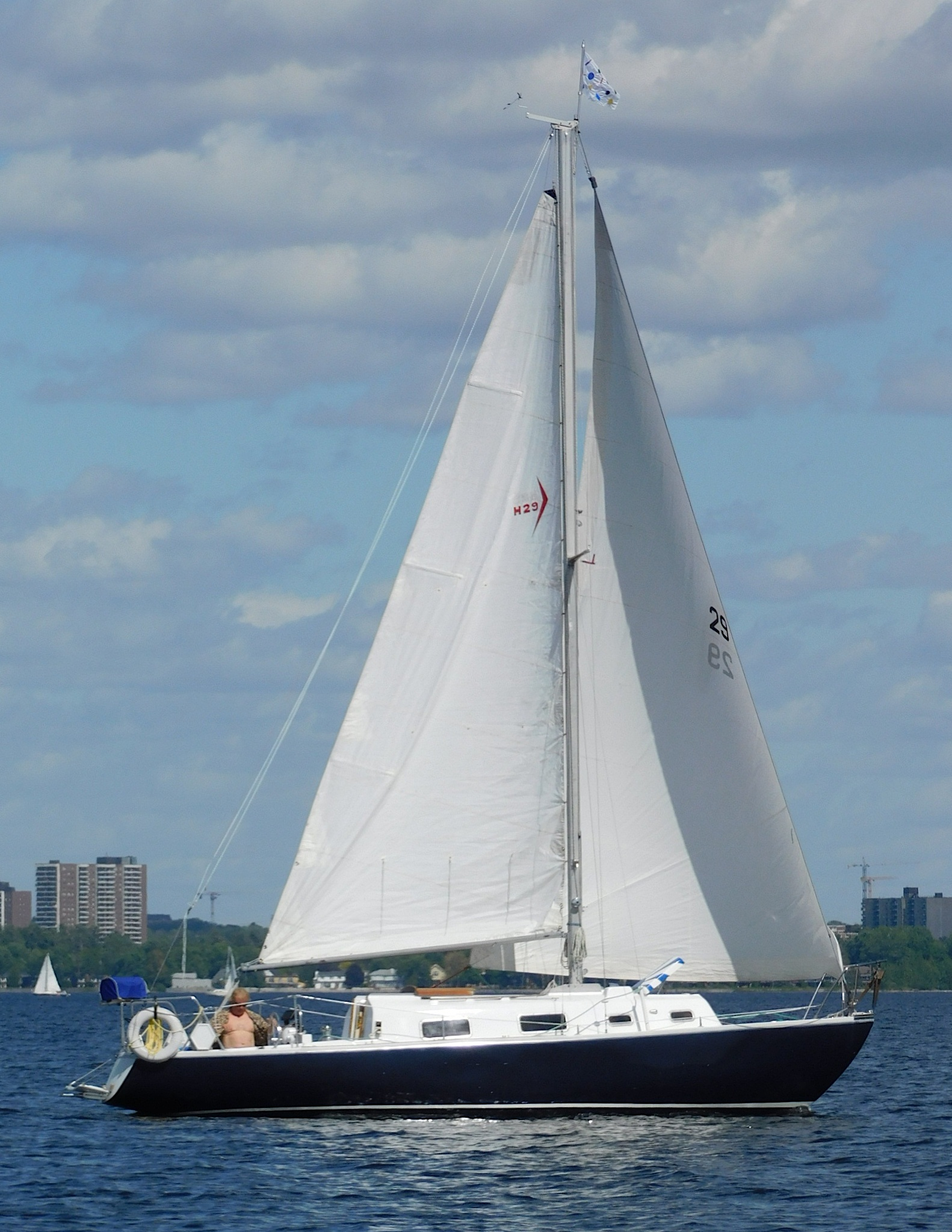
Hughes 29

Summary of boats built by Hughes Boat Works:

- Hughes 24 - 1966
- Hughes 38-1 - 1967
- Hinckley 38 - 1968
- Hughes 25 - 1968
- Hughes 38-2 - 1970
- Hughes 48 - 1970
- North Star 48 - 1970
- Hughes 22 - 1971
- Hughes 36 - 1971
- North Star 38 - 1971
- North Star 22 - 1972
- PJ 30 1/2 Ton - 1973
- North Star 80/20 - 1973
- North Star 500 - 1973
- North Star 1000 - 1973
- North Star 1500 - 1974
- Hughes 29 - 1975
- Hughes 40 - 1975
- North Star 600 - 1975
- Farr 727 - 1976
- Columbia 8.3 - 1976
- Hughes 26 - 1976
- Hughes 35 - 1977
- Hughes 38-3 - 1977
- Hughes-Columbia 27 - 1978
- Columbia 7.6 - 1979
- Columbia 8.7 - 1979
- Hughes 31 - 1979
- Hughes-Columbia 36 - 1979

== See also ==
- List of sailboat designers and manufacturers
