= Hughes 38-2 =

Sailboat class

Development
- Designer: Sparkman & Stephens
- Location: Canada
- Year: 1970
- Builder: Hughes Boat Works
- Role: Cruiser-Racer
- Name: Hughes 38-2

Boat
- Displacement: 12,700 lb (5,761 kg)
- Draft: 6.00 ft (1.83 m)

Hull
- Type: monohull
- Construction: fibreglass
- LOA: 38.00 ft (11.58 m)
- LWL: 27.00 ft (8.23 m)
- Beam: 10.17 ft (3.10 m)
- Engine: Universal Atomic 4 gasoline engine

Hull appendages
- Keel: fin keel
- Rudder: skeg-mounted rudder

Rig
- Rig type: Bermuda rig
- I foretriangle height: 43.50 ft (13.26 m)
- J foretriangle base: 14.50 ft (4.42 m)
- P mainsail luff: 39.20 ft (11.95 m)
- E mainsail foot: 13.70 ft (4.18 m)

Sails
- Sailplan: masthead sloop
- Mainsail area: 268.52 sq ft (24.946 m^{2})
- Jib/genoa area: 315.38 sq ft (29.300 m^{2})
- Total sail area: 583.90 sq ft (54.246 m^{2})

The Hughes 38-2 or Hughes 38 Mark II, is a Canadian sailboat that was designed by Sparkman & Stephens as a cruiser-racer and first built in 1970. The boat is a version of Sparkman & Stephens' design number 1903.

The Hughes 38-2 is a development of the 1967 Hughes 38-1 and was later developed into the Hughes 38-3. All are based on the same Sparkman & Stephens hull design. When Hughes Boat Works was renamed North Star Yachts the design was developed into the North Star 38.

== Production ==
The design was built by Hughes Boat Works in Canada, from 1970 until 1971, but it is now out of production.

== Design ==
The Hughes 38-2 incorporated a number of changes from the 38-1, including a T-shaped cockpit, the option of a taller mast for areas with lighter winds and a redesigned interior.

The 38-2 is a recreational keelboat, built predominantly of fibreglass, with wood trim. It has a masthead sloop rig; a raked stem; a raised counter, reverse transom; a skeg-mounted rudder controlled by a tiller and a fixed, swept fin keel. It displaces 12,700 lb (5,761 kg).

The boat has a draft of 6.00 ft (1.83 m) with the standard keel.

The boat is fitted with a Universal Atomic 4 gasoline engine for docking and manoeuvring.

The design has sleeping accommodation for five people, with a double "V"-berth in the bow cabin, two straight settees in the main cabin and an aft quarter berth on the port side. The galley is located on the starboard side just forward of the companionway ladder. The galley is equipped with a stove, ice box and a sink. A navigation station is opposite the galley, on the port side. The head is located just aft of the bow cabin on the port side.

For sailing the design may be equipped with a jib or a larger genoa.

The design has a hull speed of 6.96 kn (12.89 km/h).

== See also ==
- List of sailing boat types
