= Hughes 38-3 =

Sailboat class

Development
- Designer: Sparkman & Stephens
- Location: Canada
- Year: 1977
- Builder: Hughes Boat Works
- Role: Cruiser-Racer
- Name: Hughes 38-3

Boat
- Displacement: 14,500 lb (6,577 kg)
- Draft: 5.83 ft (1.78 m)

Hull
- Type: monohull
- Construction: fibreglass
- LOA: 37.90 ft (11.55 m)
- LWL: 27.00 ft (8.23 m)
- Beam: 10.17 ft (3.10 m)
- Engine: Universal Atomic 4 gasoline engine

Hull appendages
- Keel: fin keel
- Ballast: 6,400 lb (2,903 kg)
- Rudder: skeg-mounted rudder

Rig
- Rig type: Bermuda rig
- I foretriangle height: 43.50 ft (13.26 m)
- J foretriangle base: 14.50 ft (4.42 m)
- P mainsail luff: 39.23 ft (11.96 m)
- E mainsail foot: 13.74 ft (4.19 m)

Sails
- Sailplan: masthead sloop
- Mainsail area: 269.51 sq ft (25.038 m^{2})
- Jib/genoa area: 315.38 sq ft (29.300 m^{2})
- Total sail area: 584.89 sq ft (54.338 m^{2})

The Hughes 38-3 or Hughes 38 Mark III, is a Canadian sailboat that was designed by Sparkman & Stephens as a cruiser-racer and first built in 1977.

The Hughes 38-3 is a development of the Hughes 38-2, which was developed in turn from the Hughes 38-1. All three designs use Sparkman & Stephens' hull design number 1903.

== Production ==
The design was built by Hughes Boat Works in Canada, from 1977 until 1982, but it is now out of production.

== Design ==
The boat differs from the 38-2 in that it has a larger coach roof and a commensurately smaller cockpit, plus other minor design changes.

The Hughes 38-3 is a recreational keelboat, built predominantly of fibreglass, with wood trim. It has a masthead sloop rig; a raked stem; a raised counter, reverse transom; a skeg-mounted rudder controlled by a wheel and a fixed, swept fin keel. It displaces 14,500 lb (6,577 kg) and carries 6,400 lb (2,903 kg) of ballast.

The boat has a draft of 5.83 ft (1.78 m) with the standard keel.

The boat was factory-equipped with a Universal Atomic 4 gasoline engine for docking and manoeuvring. The fuel tank holds 15 U.S. gallons (57 L; 12 imp gal) and the fresh water tank has a capacity of 45 U.S. gallons (170 L; 37 imp gal).

The cabin design includes sleeping accommodation for five people, with a double "V"-berth in the bow cabin, two straight settees in the main cabin to port and starboard and an aft quarter berth on the port side. The galley is located on the starboard side just forward of the companionway ladder. The galley is equipped with a two-burner stove, ice box and a sink. A navigation station is opposite the galley, on the port side. The head is located just aft of the bow cabin on the port side.

The design has a hull speed of 6.96 kn (12.89 km/h).

== See also ==
- List of sailing boat types
