= Sparkman & Stephens =

Naval architecture and yacht brokerage firm

- Type: Private
- Industry: Naval Architecture
- Founded: 1929
- Headquarters: Newport, RI
- Key people: Olin J. Stephens; Roderick "Rod" Stephens
- Products: Sail and Power Yacht Design
- Website: www.sparkmanstephens.com

Sparkman & Stephens is a naval architecture and yacht brokerage firm with offices in Newport, Rhode Island and Fort Lauderdale, Florida, United States. The firm performs design and engineering of new and existing vessels for pleasure, commercial, and military use. Sparkman & Stephens also acts as a ship and yacht brokerage. The firm offers similar design and engineering services for the performance optimization of existing yachts.

Their designs have won most of the major international yacht races such as the America's Cup, for several decades, including a string of victories in the Fastnet and Sydney to Hobart as well as winning twice the Whitbread Round the World Race by Sayula II in 1974 and Flyer in 1978. S&S has a number of custom yacht design projects as well as being designers for boat builders such as Nautor's Swan, Grand Banks Yachts, and Morris Yachts. With more than 100 units built, the S&S design #1710 also known as Swan 36 became the most utilized design in the history of Sparkman & Stephens.

During World War II the company was employed to design the hulls for the invaluable DUKW 'army duck' and the Ford GPA amphibious jeep. For this Roderick Stephens was awarded the Medal of Freedom, the United States' highest civilian award.

== History ==
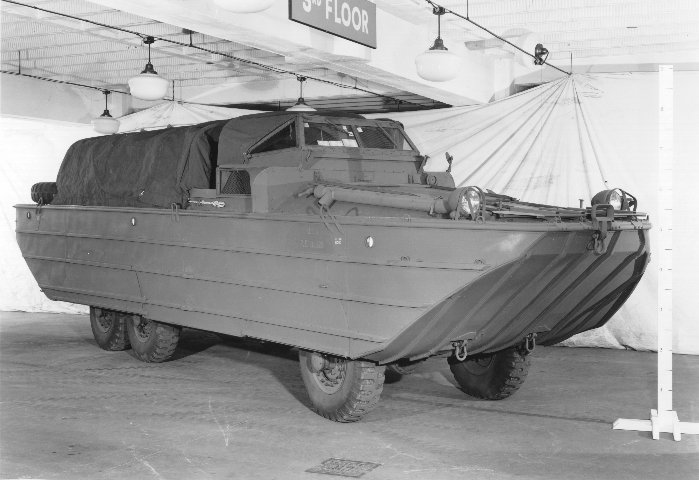
DUKW

Sparkman & Stephens Inc was formally created on October 28, 1929, with five partners: Drake Sparkman and his younger brother James Sparkman, James Murray, and brothers Olin J. Stephens and Roderick Stephens.

The Stephens brothers began their careers as self-taught sailors on Barnstable Bay, Massachusetts. Both entered the marine industry at an early age – Olin apprenticing in yacht design under Philip Rhodes, and Roderick learning shipbuilding at the prominent Nevins Yard in City Island, New York, which would later produce several of his firm's designs. With their father's backing, the 21-year-old Olin and his brother entered into a partnership with the already successful yacht broker Drake Sparkman, and Sparkman & Stephens, Inc. was formed.

S&S remains involved in designs having created a range of production sailing yachts such as the Morris 36 and 52 and a number of custom super-sailers including Victoria of Strathern and the 52-meter ketch Nazenin V, recently bestowed with multiple Superyacht of the Year Awards.

In August 2018 Donald Tofias purchased S&S and is now the firm's president.

The brokers at Sparkman & Stephens represent over 800 crewed charter yachts worldwide in both sail and power, from 55 to 200 + ft.

== Designs ==
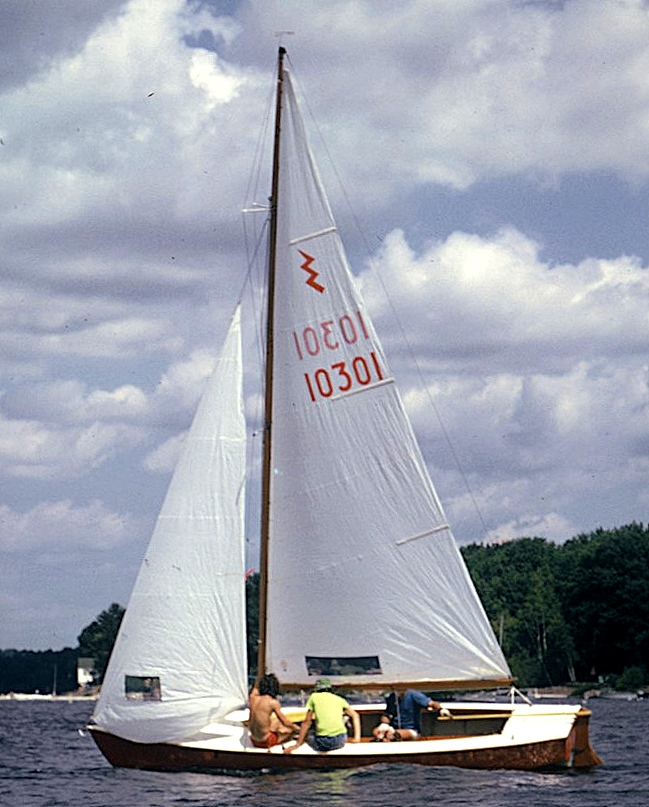
Lightning (dinghy)

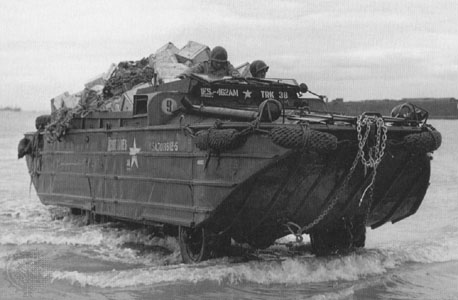
DUKW

- Aura A35
- Cape Cod Mercury 15
- Catalina 38
- D&M 22
- Designers Choice
- Dolphin 24
- DUKW
- Howmar 12
- Hughes 26
- Hughes 31
- Hughes 35
- Hughes 38-1
- Hughes 38-2
- Hughes 38-3
- Hughes 40
- Hughes 48
- Hylas 47
- Hylas 49
- Interclub
- Lightning
- Nautor 43
- Nautor Swan 47
- New Horizons 26
- North Star 38
- North Star 48
- North Star 80/20
- North Star 500
- North Star 600
- North Star 1000
- North Star 1500
- Pilot 35
- Sailmaster 22
- Seafarer 23 Kestrel
- Seafarer 45
- Seafarer 46
- Seafarer 48
- Seguin 44
- S&S 34
- Shields
- Stevens 47
- Swan 36
- Swan 37
- Swan 40
- Swan 55
- Swan 65
- Tartan 27
- Tartan 34 C
- Tartan 34-2
- Tartan Ten
- Tartan 41
- Weekender 24
- Yankee 38

== See also ==
- List of sailboat designers and manufacturers
- William Shaw (yacht designer)
