= Skeg =

Extension of a boat's keel at the back, also a surfboard's fin

A skeg (or skegg or skag) is a sternward extension of the keel of boats and ships which have a rudder mounted on the centre line. The term also applies to the lowest point on an outboard motor or the outdrive of an inboard/outboard. (Note: "A small fin fitted aft of the keel to protect the rudder and propeller, and improve steering and tracking." MacKenzie, Mike (2005–2012). "Skeg". Seatalk, the Dictionary of English Nautical Language.) (Note: "Skeg, or Skegg. A projecting stump formerly left on the keel, abaft the stern-post. The after-end of the keel. The composition piece supporting the heel of an equipoise rudder." A naval encyclopædia: comprising a dictionary of nautical words and phrases; biographical notices, and records of naval officers; special articles of naval art and science note:ironbark can strengthen the skeg but is not a reliable protection against shipworm. Samples exposed to coastal sea conditions have shown extensive damage to ironbark from shipworm, even in northern waters such as along the Alaskan coast. (W.H. DeVaney). Philadelphia: LR Hamersly & Co. 1881. at Internet Archive) In more recent years, the name has been used for a fin on a surfboard which improves directional stability and to a movable fin on a kayak which adjusts the boat's centre of lateral resistance (it moves the center of resistance relative to the center of effort). The term is also often used for the fin on water skis in the U.S. It has been used for the vertical fin on seaplane hulls and floats. The wear-bar on the bottom of snowmobile ski may also be called a skeg.

== Etymology ==
The word originates in the Scandinavian word for beard; in Old Norse, skegg. In Icelandic the word remains skegg, in modern Norwegian Bokmål and Nynorsk, it appears as skjegg, in Swedish, it is skägg and in Danish, skæg. The Norwegian pronunciation of the letter combination skj is as in the English sh. The word is related to the English shaggy. It also appears in the English place name Skegness - 'beard point', from the way in which a series of tombolos forms, towards the nearby Gibraltar Point. Here, the English pronunciation reflects a probable Danish origin, which pronounces the sk letter combination as an English speaker would expect.

== In boats and ships ==
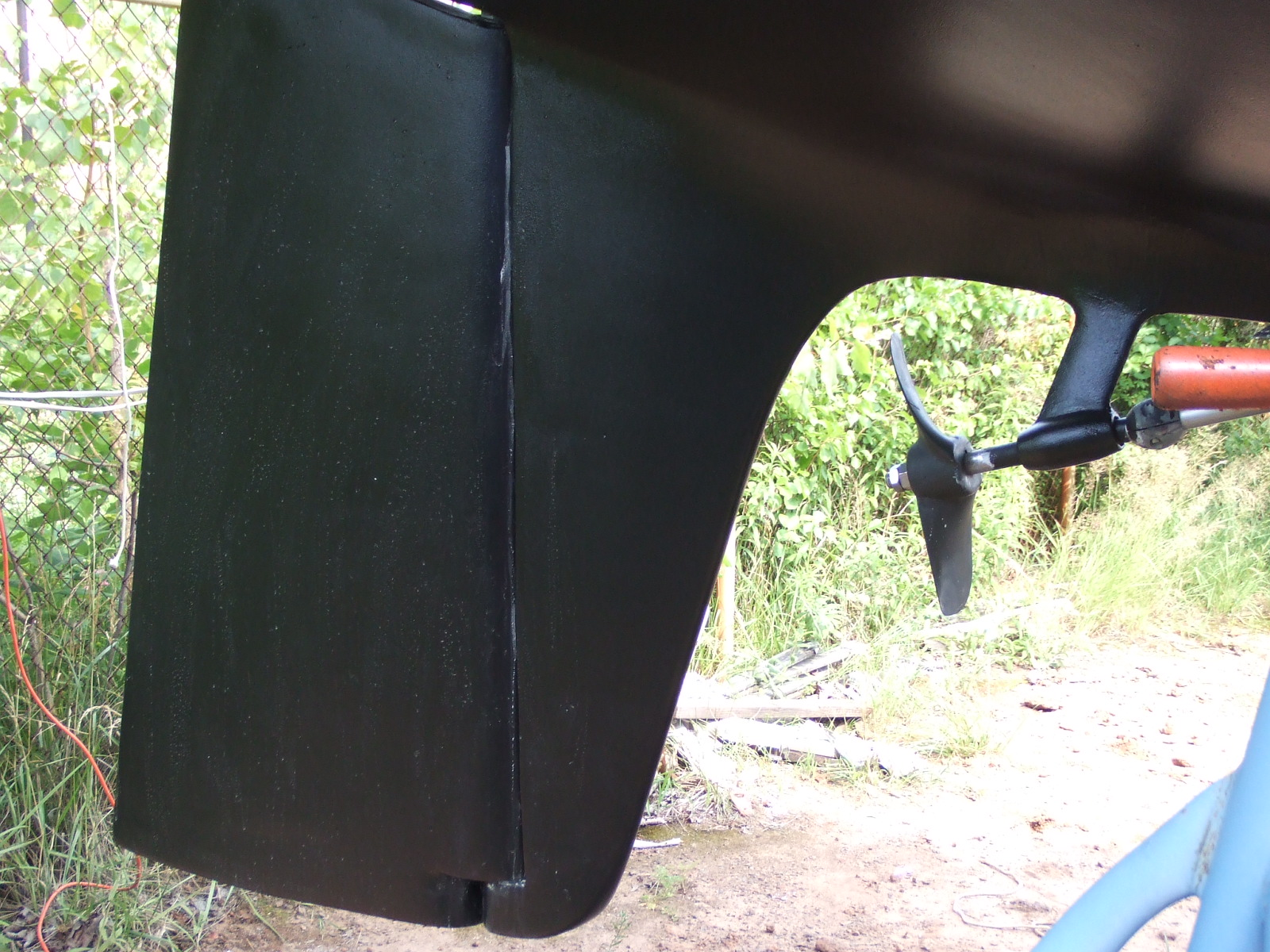
A skeg-mounted rudder

Where a vessel's rudder is mounted on the centre-line, it is usual to hang it on gudgeons and pintles, the latter being upright pins and the former, rings to fit round them. Together, they form a hinge. This naturally leaves a small gap between the sternpost and the rudder, into which stray items like kelp and rope can catch, causing drag and threatening the security of the vessel's steering. In ships such as Mary Rose, the skeg is a very small feature; a tapered extension of the keel below the leading edge of the rudder. This somewhat beard-like sternward extension of the keel is the basic skeg. Subsequently, the lowest pintle was commonly mounted below the rudder on a metal extension of the keel. This helped further stabilize and protect the rudder and the name skeg was transferred to it. It used to be relatively small until screw propellers were introduced, when it had to reach below the screw and became a proportionately larger feature protecting both screw and rudder from damage.

On wooden vessels, the skeg may be protected from worm damage by the addition of a bug shoe, or a "a length of hardened material, such as ironbark, placed on the sternward keel extension (skeg) to protect from shipworm damage."

In more modern installations, with more than one screw, a fitting supports each propeller shaft just ahead of its screw. This is usually called a shaft bracket but the part of it which extends below the shaft bearing to protect the lower part of the propeller is also a skeg. Similarly, the protective projection of the drive casing, below the rotational axis of the propeller of an outboard motor is another form of the skeg.

Where a yacht is designed with a fin keel, it will normally also have a skeg-mounted rudder.

== Rowing shells ==
A skeg on rowing shells is the fin attached to the keel of the shell that helps stabilize it and maintain a straight course. The rudder attaches to the skeg and is steered by cables attached to it. In select sweeping boats, typically fours and eights, a coxswain will control the rudder, while in sculling boats and some sweeping boats, especially pairs, the rudder will be controlled with toe-steering. A skeg typically consists of a flat piece of metal or plastic. Some crews, like Rutgers Crew, use polished wooden skegs that break off upon impact with debris in order to protect potential damage to the hull of the shell.

== Surfing ==
In surfing, windsurfing, and kitesurfing, skegs, usually known as "fins", are attached toward the tail of the board to improve directional stability and control through foot-steering. Fins allow the rider to control the board's direction by varying their side-to-side weight distribution.

Fixed fins were introduced to surfboards by surfing pioneer Tom Blake in 1935. Around 1936, Woody Brown independently added a fixed fin to his second surfboard design, which further popularized the feature. The stability and control it allowed revolutionized the sport.

Small single aluminum fins first evolved into larger wooden versions, then ones made from fiberglass and carbon fiber. In time, hydrodynamic improvements took place, pioneered by George Downing, who also created the first removable skeg, which was a teak wood skeg in a teak wood box which was supposed to be held in place by the swelling of the wood in water. In modern surfing board design, the conventional set-up is to have three fins, with single fins being a minority. While most windsurfing boards are single-fin, wave boards now feature some twin-fin, tri-fin and quad-fin designs. Directional kitesurfing boards are usually three-fin, with five-fin designs being used for improved upwind performance.

== Kayaks ==
A skeg is employed in the type of kayak used on more open water such as the sea. Its purpose and use are rather different from those of the surfing skeg. In the kayak, the amount of exposure of the skeg to the water, and also its effect on the position of the boat's centre of lateral resistance (CLR), is freely adjustable by the crew. The adjustment varies the degree to which the wind affects the boat – that is, the amount of lateral movement the wind can cause by impacting the upper parts of the boat and the crew. In more conventional calculations, this would be the centre of effort of the sail area (CE). In still water, where the wind is pushing the boat sideways, a contrary force (lateral resistance) develops, resisting that movement. If the central points of the application of those two forces coincide, the boat moves steadily sideways. Otherwise, it rotates in the horizontal plane, until they are in line. By varying the CLR, it is possible to better control the boat's attitude towards the wind and waves. Irregular flowing movement of the water complicates the issue, however. They may be made of wood, fiberglass or aluminum. Some are deployed using internal cables, but others use external ropes and bungee cord. Typically, these are retractable, and they are not a rudder. If properly configured (e.g., use of street sign aluminum in a narrow box that extends through the hull) they will not flex, and will greatly decrease and counter pitch, roll and yaw, like a centerboard on a sailboat, when the craft is moving. In that sense, the skeg acts as a lifting foil.

== Aircraft ==
Skegs have been used to improve the directional stability of seaplanes. They have been installed on floats and hulls.

== Snowmobiles ==
The skis on a snowmobile have a metal wear-bar on the bottom of them. Many sledders call these "skegs". These skegs help the skis to steer on hard surfaces. These often have carbide embedded in them to reduce wear when driven on non-snow surfaces.

== See also ==
- Glossary of nautical terms (A–L)
- Glossary of nautical terms (M–Z)
