= Niagara 35 =

Sailboat class

Development
- Designer: Mark Ellis
- Location: Canada
- Year: 1978
- No. built: 260
- Builder: Hinterhoeller Yachts
- Role: Cruiser

Boat
- Displacement: 14,000 lb (6,350 kg)
- Draft: 5.17 ft (1.58 m)

Hull
- Type: Monohull
- Construction: Fibreglass
- LOA: 35.08 ft (10.69 m)
- LWL: 26.67 ft (8.13 m)
- Beam: 11.42 ft (3.48 m)
- Engine: Universal M24D 35 hp (26 kW) diesel engine

Hull appendages
- Keel: fin keel
- Ballast: 5,500 lb (2,495 kg)
- Rudder: internally-mounted spade-type rudder

Rig
- Rig type: Bermuda rig
- I foretriangle height: 45.00 ft (13.72 m)
- J foretriangle base: 16.00 ft (4.88 m)
- P mainsail luff: 38.00 ft (11.58 m)
- E mainsail foot: 12.50 ft (3.81 m)

Sails
- Sailplan: Masthead sloop
- Mainsail area: 237.50 sq ft (22.064 m^{2})
- Jib/genoa area: 360.00 sq ft (33.445 m^{2})
- Total sail area: 597.50 sq ft (55.510 m^{2})

Rating
- PHRF: 144 (average)

The Niagara 35 is a Canadian sailboat that was designed by Mark Ellis as a cruiser and first built in 1978.

== Production ==
The design was built by Hinterhoeller Yachts in St Catharines, Ontario, Canada and first shown at the Toronto International Boat Show in 1978. The company built the design from 1978 to 1990, with 260 examples completed. About half the production run went to customers in the United States.

== Design ==
Ellis explained his design goals for the Niagara 35: "she is a cruising boat that made sense ... Her underwater shape is similar to racing boats of the 1970s ... The spade rudder is balanced and the keel form is a simple NACA foil without deep draught. Her sheer line is moderate and the ends are balanced ... I suppose you could say she is a moderate design, but that sounds dull – I hope the 35 is better than that!"

The Niagara 35 is a recreational keelboat, built predominantly of fibreglass over a balsa core, with teak wood trim. It has a masthead sloop rig with aluminum spars and a bowsprit, a spooned raked stem, a raised counter transom, an internally mounted spade-type rudder controlled by a wheel and a fixed fin keel. It displaces 14,000 lb (6,350 kg) and carries 5,500 lb (2,495 kg) of ballast.

The boat has a draft of 5.17 ft (1.58 m) with the standard keel fitted.

The boat was factory-fitted with a Universal M24D 35 hp (26 kW), or a 21 hp (16 kW) Volvo, or a four-cylinder 29 hp (22 kW) Westerbeke diesel engine for docking and maneuvering. The fuel tank holds 30 U.S. gallons (110 L; 25 imp gal) and the fresh water tank has a capacity of 80 U.S. gallons (300 L; 67 imp gal).

The boat was built with two interior configurations. Initially it had an unconventional arrangement, with two small cabins, a single to starboard and a double to port, on each side of the companionway steps, the galley, with a three-burned propane stove, icebox and sink amidships to port and the head amidships to starboard, along with a chart table. The main saloon is forward and the forepeak is used for storage space and includes a work bench and access to the foredeck via a large overhead hatch. In 1984 a new interior configuration, called the "Encore", was introduced due to customer demand for a much more conventional arrangement. It has a bow "V"-berth with a head just aft, a main saloon and a U-shaped galley, an aft quarter berth and a nav station. In 1985 the boat's bowsprit was extended in length.

Ventilation is provided by the bow hatch and hatches above both the gallery and head. There are also four fixed ports and six opening ones.

Sail handling includes genoa tracks, a dedicated halyard winch mounted on the mast, two cabin-top winches and two mounted on the cockpit coaming. The boat has slab-reefing, a 4:1 boom vang, a topping lift and an internally-led outhaul.

The design has a PHRF racing average handicap of 144.

== Operational history ==
A number of long voyages have been made in Niagara 35s. Gordon McClarity sailed from Vancouver, British Columbia to New Zealand, Australia, Japan and back to Vancouver. Pierre Desjardins sailed his Niagara 35 from Montreal to the Greek Islands.

Writing in Canadian Yachting in 1994, Paul Howard described the design: "The Niagara 35 is neither a traditional cruiser (the fin keel and spade rudder are modern), nor modern racer-cruiser (the fin keel and spade rudder are too traditional). Indeed, it notable sheer further confuses the matter. The Niagara’s high topsides compare to contemporary designs but its coach house hints at the traditional shapes and trim of older designs."

A review in Cruising World written by Jayne Finn in 2006, stated, "Traditional looks combined with modern features draw frequent compliments for the Niagara 35 ... Under way, the boat is stable and stiff, and we've had the rail of our Niagara 35, Phantasia II, in the water only once, when beating down Lake Huron in 20 knots of wind. On that same trip we hooted and hollered downwind at over 8 knots on a day on which virtually no one else was out. While the boat tracks and maneuvers well, sail trim and the right sail combinations really make or break progress upwind or in light air."

In a review Michael McGoldrick wrote, "Many people believe that Mark Ellis (of Nonsuch fame) came very close to setting the standard for the ideal cruising boat in the 35 foot range with the design for the Niagara 35. It seems to have struck a good balance between the requirements for livability and a no-nonsense cruising boat. This, along with its length of 35 feet, means the Niagara 35 is the kind of boat which starts to attract the attention of people who plan to live aboard for extended periods of time."

A review in Practical Sailor magazine concluded, "despite numerous passages to the Caribbean and South Pacific, the Niagara 35 is not really a round-the-world type—among other things, it’s considered too small by many of today’s bluewater sailors."

== See also ==
- List of sailing boat types

Related development

- Niagara 31

Similar sailboats

- C&C 34/36
- C&C 35
- Express 35
- Goderich 35
- Hughes 36
- Hughes-Columbia 36
- Hunter 35 Legend
- Hunter 35.5 Legend
- Island Packet 35
- Landfall 35
- Mirage 35
- Pilot 35
