= Cal 35 =

Sailboat class

Development
- Designer: William Lapworth
- Location: United States
- Year: 1979
- Builder: Cal Yachts
- Role: Cruiser
- Name: Cal 35

Boat
- Displacement: 13,000 lb (5,897 kg)
- Draft: 5.00 ft (1.52 m)

Hull
- Type: Monohull
- Construction: Fiberglass
- LOA: 35.08 ft (10.69 m)
- LWL: 28.75 ft (8.76 m)
- Beam: 11.00 ft (3.35 m)
- Engine: Universal 32 hp (24 kW) diesel engine

Hull appendages
- Keel: fin keel
- Ballast: 5,200 lb (2,359 kg)
- Rudder: internally-mounted spade-type rudder

Rig
- Rig type: Bermuda rig
- I foretriangle height: 46.50 ft (14.17 m)
- J foretriangle base: 15.00 ft (4.57 m)
- P mainsail luff: 40.50 ft (12.34 m)
- E mainsail foot: 12.50 ft (3.81 m)

Sails
- Sailplan: Masthead sloop
- Mainsail area: 253.13 sq ft (23.517 m^{2})
- Jib/genoa area: 348.75 sq ft (32.400 m^{2})
- Total sail area: 601.88 sq ft (55.916 m^{2})

Racing
- PHRF: 136

The Cal 35 is an American sailboat that was designed by C. William Lapworth as a cruiser and first built in 1979.

The Cal 35 is sometimes confused with the earlier Cal 35 Cruise series of sailboats.

== Production ==
The design was built by Cal Yachts in the United States, but it is now out of production.

== Design ==
The Cal 35 is a recreational keelboat, built predominantly of fiberglass sandwich construction, with wood trim. It has a masthead sloop rig with aluminium spars, a raked stem, a reverse transom, an internally mounted spade-type rudder controlled by a wheel and a fixed fin keel. It displaces 13,000 lb (5,897 kg) and carries 5,200 lb (2,359 kg) of ballast.

The boat has a draft of 5.00 ft (1.52 m) with the standard keel and 6.00 ft (1.83 m) with the optional deep draft keel.

The boat is fitted with a Universal diesel engine of 32 hp (24 kW) for docking and maneuvering. The fuel tank holds 33 U.S. gallons (120 L; 27 imp gal) and the fresh water tank has a capacity of 90 U.S. gallons (340 L; 75 imp gal).

Ventilation consists of four opening ports in the main cabin, plus two in the bow cabin. There is a dorade vent over the head. There are also four fixed ports in the main cabin, plus fixed, flush-mounted deadlights over the galley and the forward berths.

The mainsail is sheeted to a mainsheet traveler on the cabin roof. The genoa is sheeted to tracks and is controlled with two-speed winches. There are two halyard winches. The mainsail boom has a topping lift and two internal reefs, an internal outhaul and a boom vang with a 4:1 mechanical advantage.

The design has a PHRF racing average handicap of 136.

== Variants ==
Cal 35 Mark I
This model was introduced in 1979. It has an interior with the head (with a shower) located on the port side at the bottom of the companionway steps. The galley is located aft. Sleeping accommodation is located forward.
Cal 35 Mark II
This model was introduced in 1981. It has revised interior, with the head located forward on the starboard side, just aft of the bow "V"-berth. The galley is on he port side and includes a three-burner alcohol-fired stove and an oven. An aft double berth on the starboard side was optional.

== See also ==
- List of sailing boat types

Similar sailboats

- C&C 34/36
- C&C 35
- Express 35
- Goderich 35
- Hughes 36
- Hughes-Columbia 36
- Hunter 35 Legend
- Hunter 35.5 Legend
- Island Packet 35
- Landfall 35
- Mirage 35
- Pilot 35
