= Southern Cross 35 =

Sailboat class

Development
- Designer: Thomas C. Gillmer
- Location: United States
- Year: 1978
- No. built: 95
- Builder: C. E. Ryder
- Role: Cruiser
- Name: Southern Cross 35

Boat
- Displacement: 17,700 lb (8,029 kg)
- Draft: 4.92 ft (1.50 m)

Hull
- Type: Monohull
- Construction: Fiberglass
- LOA: 35.25 ft (10.74 m)
- LWL: 28.00 ft (8.53 m)
- Beam: 11.42 ft (3.48 m)
- Engine: Universal or Yanmar 30 hp (22 kW) diesel engine

Hull appendages
- Keel: fin keel
- Ballast: 5,750 lb (2,608 kg)
- Rudder: skeg-mounted rudder

Rig
- Rig type: Bermuda rig
- I foretriangle height: 45.30 ft (13.81 m)
- J foretriangle base: 16.80 ft (5.12 m)
- P mainsail luff: 40.00 ft (12.19 m)
- E mainsail foot: 12.30 ft (3.75 m)

Sails
- Sailplan: Cutter rigged sloop
- Mainsail area: 246.00 sq ft (22.854 m^{2})
- Jib/genoa area: 380.52 sq ft (35.351 m^{2})
- Total sail area: 626.52 sq ft (58.206 m^{2})

Racing
- PHRF: 174

The Southern Cross 35, also called the Gillmer 35, is an American sailboat that was designed by Thomas C. Gillmer as a cruiser and first built in 1978.

== Production ==
The design was built by C. E. Ryder in Bristol, Rhode Island, United States. The company built 95 examples of the design starting in 1978, but it is now out of production.

== Design ==
The Southern Cross 35 is a recreational keelboat, built predominantly of fiberglass with an Airtex core in the hull and a balsa core for the deck, and also with wooden trim. It has a cutter rig, a raked stem, a canoe style transom, a skeg-mounted rudder controlled by a wheel and a fixed raked fin keel with a cutaway forefoot. It displaces 17,700 lb (8,029 kg) and carries 5,750 lb (2,608 kg) of lead ballast.

The boat has a draft of 4.92 ft (1.50 m) with the standard keel fitted.

The boat is fitted with either a Universal or Yanmar diesel engine of 30 hp (22 kW) for docking and maneuvering. The fuel tank holds 35 U.S. gallons (130 L; 29 imp gal) and the fresh water tank has a capacity of 90 U.S. gallons (340 L; 75 imp gal).

The below deck accommodation includes a bow "V"-berth and a double settee berth to port in the main cabin. The galley is aft, at the foot of the companionway steps to starboard and includes a three-burner propane stove and oven, foot-pumped water and an icebox with 4 in (10 cm) of insulation. Then main cabin drop-leaf table mounts to the mast. The main cabin has a teak grate sole and teak and white oak woodwork. The head is forward on the port side and includes a shower, with a fiberglass pan floor and a teak grate. There is a wet locker and navigation station opposite the head.

Ventilation includes an opening hatch above the galley, plus an opening galley port. The main cabin has an opening hatch and eight opening ports.

The boat was factory supplied with a complete suite of sails, including several genoas, jibs, storm jibs and jib-topsails. The staysail is boom-mounted and self-tending. There is an anchor well on the bow and an anchor rode locker.

The mainsheet traveler is cockpit mounted, just forward of the helm position for easy access while sailing. There are halyard winches on the cabin roof and two genoa winches on the curved cockpit coaming. The genoa sheets route through a track that allows close sheeting of the sail. The mainsail has jiffy reefing and has a topping lift supplied. The standing rigging is of steel rod construction.

The design has a PHRF racing average handicap of 174.

== Operational history ==
Rodney Glover, writing for Cruising World in 2008, described the design, "the Southern Cross 35 was the last of the series. It's a canoe-stern cutter with a traditional look but with a modern underbody featuring a shallow fin keel and a skeg-hung rudder ... While not a racer, the SC 35 will keep up with most boats in its size range, and it will pass quite a few. It's a sweet boat offshore. It's always easy to control, even in high winds and huge seas, and despite its relatively low freeboard, the boat is very dry."

A 2015 review by R. Boothby for Blue Water Boats described the boat, "the Southern Cross 35 is wide-beamed and graced with a sweeping sheerline that keeps her exceptionally dry in a rough seaway. At the same time, a relatively high-aspect rig along with a fin keel and skeg-mounted rudder allow her to combine impressive sea-worthiness with surprisingly lively performance."

== See also ==
- List of sailing boat types

Related development

- Southern Cross 28

Similar sailboats

- C&C 34/36
- C&C 35
- Express 35
- Goderich 35
- Hughes 36
- Hughes-Columbia 36
- Hunter 35 Legend
- Hunter 35.5 Legend
- Island Packet 35
- Landfall 35
- Mirage 35
- Pilot 35
