= Pilot 35 =

Sailboat class

Development
- Designer: Sparkman & Stephens
- Location: United States
- Year: 1962
- No. built: 117
- Builder: Henry R. Hinckley & Company
- Role: Racer
- Name: Pilot 35

Boat
- Displacement: 13,700 lb (6,214 kg)
- Draft: 5.00 ft (1.52 m)

Hull
- Type: Monohull
- Construction: Fiberglass
- LOA: 35.75 ft (10.90 m)
- LWL: 25.00 ft (7.62 m)
- Beam: 9.50 ft (2.90 m)
- Engine: Westerbeke 4-107 FWC 35 hp (26 kW) diesel engine

Hull appendages
- Keel: long keel
- Ballast: 4,600 lb (2,087 kg)
- Rudder: keel-mounted rudder

Rig
- Rig type: Bermuda rig
- I foretriangle height: 40.25 ft (12.27 m)
- J foretriangle base: 13.83 ft (4.22 m)
- P mainsail luff: 35.98 ft (10.97 m)
- E mainsail foot: 15.50 ft (4.72 m)

Sails
- Sailplan: Masthead sloop
- Mainsail area: 271.87 sq ft (25.258 m^{2})
- Jib/genoa area: 278.33 sq ft (25.858 m^{2})
- Total sail area: 550.20 sq ft (51.115 m^{2})

Racing
- D-PN: 81

The Pilot 35 is an American sailboat that was designed by Sparkman & Stephens as a racer-cruiser and first built in 1962.

== Production ==
The boat was designated as Sparkman & Stephens design #1727 and was intended as fiberglass boat especially for Henry R. Hinckley & Company (Hinckley Yachts), who built the design in Southwest Harbor, Maine, United States. A total of 117 examples of the design were completed between 1962 and 1975, but it is now out of production. Some sources say 13 were completed as yawls while others state 25.

Five boats were delivered with a custom raised cabin "dog house".

About 12 boats were built under licence in South America for use by the Chilean Navy.

== Design ==
The Pilot 35 is a recreational keelboat, built predominantly of fiberglass, with teak wood trim above decks. It has a masthead sloop rig or optional mizzen mast and yawl rig, with aluminum spars. It features a spooned raked stem, a raised counter transom, a keel-mounted rudder controlled by a wheel and a fixed long keel. A tall rig for sailing in areas with lighter winds was also optional, with a mast about 2.12 ft (0.65 m) taller. It displaces 13,700 lb (6,214 kg) and carries 4,600 lb (2,087 kg) of lead ballast.

The boat has a draft of 5.00 ft (1.52 m) with the standard keel fitted.

The boat is fitted with a Westerbeke 4-107 FWC diesel engine of 35 hp (26 kW) or a Universal 30 hp (22 kW) gasoline engine for docking and maneuvering. The fuel tank holds 35 U.S. gallons (130 L; 29 imp gal) and the fresh water tank has a capacity of 70 U.S. gallons (260 L; 58 imp gal).

The below decks woodwork is of Philippine mahogany, with the cabin sole made from holly. Sleeping accommodation consists of a private bow cabin with a "V"-berth, a main cabin with opposite settee berths, plus optional berths mounted above the settee berths, for a total of six berths. The galley is a split design, with the two-burner, alcohol-fired stove and oven and sink to port and the refrigerator to starboard, the top of which serves as a navigation station. The head is located just aft the bow cabin and has a hanging locker opposite. Pressurized water is provided for both the head and galley.

For sailing, winches are provided for the jib as well as halyard winches. The mainsheet is aft, sheeted from the end of the boom. There are stainless steel genoa tracks and the standing rigging is also stainless steel. The toerails, handrails and the long, sweeping cockpit coaming, as well as all other topside trim parts, are all made from teak wood.

The design has a Portsmouth Yardstick racing average handicap of 81.

== Operators ==
- Chilean Navy - about 12 boats.

== See also ==
- List of sailing boat types

Similar sailboats

- C&C 34/36
- C&C 35
- Cal 35
- Cal 35 Cruise
- Goderich 35
- Hughes 36
- Hughes-Columbia 36
- Island Packet 35
- Landfall 35
- Mirage 35
- Niagara 35
- Southern Cross 35
