= Southern Cross 28 =

1970s American recreational keelboat

Development
- Designer: Thomas C. Gillmer
- Location: United States
- Year: 1978
- Builder: C. E. Ryder
- Name: Southern Cross 28

Boat
- Displacement: 8,500 lb (3,856 kg)
- Draft: 4.67 ft (1.42 m)

Hull
- Type: Monohull
- Construction: Fiberglass
- LOA: 30.42 ft (9.27 m)
- LWL: 20.17 ft (6.15 m)
- Beam: 8.50 ft (2.59 m)
- Engine: Universal Atomic 4 11 hp (8 kW) gasoline engine

Hull appendages
- Keel: fin keel
- Ballast: 3,400 lb (1,542 kg)
- Rudder: skeg-mounted rudder

Rig
- Rig type: Bermuda rig
- I foretriangle height: 34.80 ft (10.61 m)
- J foretriangle base: 13.00 ft (3.96 m)
- P mainsail luff: 31.00 ft (9.45 m)
- E mainsail foot: 12.20 ft (3.72 m)

Sails
- Sailplan: Cutter rigged sloop
- Mainsail area: 189.10 sq ft (17.568 m^{2})
- Jib/genoa area: 226.20 sq ft (21.015 m^{2})
- Total sail area: 415.30 sq ft (38.583 m^{2})

Racing
- PHRF: 230 (average)

The Southern Cross 28, also called the Gillmer 28, is an American sailboat that was designed by Thomas C. Gillmer and first built in 1978.

== Production ==
The design was built by C. E. Ryder in Bristol, Rhode Island, United States, but it is now out of production.

== Design ==
The Southern Cross 28 is a recreational keelboat, built predominantly of fiberglass, with teak wood trim. The deck is fiberglass with a balsa core, while the hull is fiberglass with an Airtex foam core.

The design has a cutter sloop rig, with a boom-mounted, self-tending staysail, a teak bowsprit, a spooned raked stem, a raised transom, a skeg-mounted rudder controlled by a tiller and a fixed swept fin keel. The keel design is a modified long keel, with a cutout for the propeller shaft, creating a fin keel. It displaces 8,500 lb (3,856 kg) and carries 3,400 lb (1,542 kg) of lead ballast.

The boat has a draft of 4.67 ft (1.42 m) with the standard keel fitted.

The boat is fitted with a Universal Atomic 4 11 hp (8 kW) gasoline engine for docking and maneuvering. The fuel tank holds 15 U.S. gallons (57 L; 12 imp gal) and the fresh water tank has a capacity of 47 U.S. gallons (180 L; 39 imp gal).

The galley is mounted on the port side at the bottom of the companionway stairs, with a sink and two-burner, alcohol-fired stove. The icebox is mounted to starboard and serves as a navigation table as well. The head is forward, just behind the bow "V"-berth and includes storage space and a hanging locker. It has privacy doors. Additional sleeping accommodation in the main cabin includes a port settee that extends under the head and a starboard settee that opens to a double. The interior wooden trim is all teak.

Ventilation is provided by dorade vents, three cowl vents, a forward hatch and six opening portlights. A midship opening hatch was a factory option.

The boat came factory-equipped with two halyard winches and two genoa winches. A topping lift and jiffy reefing were standard. Optional factory equipment included roller furling, a boom vang, spinnaker and tracks for the genoa.

The design has a PHRF racing average handicap of 230.

== Operational history ==
Sailor Donna Lange completed two solo global circumnavigations on board her Southern Cross 28, named Inspired Insanity. Her 2005 voyage lasted 17 months and she repeated the trip in 2015. During the latter voyage the boat experienced a knockdown and dismasting in 45 kn (83 km/h) winds. As a result, Lange took the boat though the Panama Canal instead of rounding Cape Horn.

In a review of the design, Richard Sherwood wrote, "the keel is modified full, and the rudder skeg is substantial. Forward, the hull flares. Displacement is moderate. With a self-tending staysail, single-handing is simple. As with all cutters, the amount of sail carried can be varied significantly. As the manufacturer says, the Southern Cross 'looks like a sailboat.'"

In a 2018 review, Sailing magazine writer David Liscio described the design as, "a diminutive sturdy cruiser that is capable of mighty bluewater passages".

== See also ==
- List of sailing boat types
- Southern Cross 35
