= Hughes-Columbia 36 =

Sailboat class

Development
- Designer: William H. Tripp Jr
- Location: Canada
- Year: 1979
- Builder: Hughes Boat Works
- Name: Hughes-Columbia 36

Boat
- Displacement: 15,000 lb (6,804 kg)
- Draft: 4.00 ft (1.22 m)

Hull
- Type: Monohull
- Construction: Fibreglass
- LOA: 35.83 ft (10.92 m)
- LWL: 28.00 ft (8.53 m)
- Beam: 10.17 ft (3.10 m)
- Engine: Diesel inboard motor 22 hp (16 kW)

Hull appendages
- Keel: fin keel
- Ballast: 6,300 lb (2,858 kg)
- Rudder: skeg-mounted rudder

Rig
- Rig type: Bermuda rig

Sails
- Sailplan: Masthead sloop or optional ketch rig
- Total sail area: 525.00 sq ft (48.774 m^{2})

The Hughes-Columbia 36 is a Canadian sailboat that was designed by William H. Tripp Jr. and first built in 1979.

The Hughes-Columbia 36 is a development of Hughes 36, which is in turn derived from the Columbia 34 Mark II hull design, built using tooling and moulds acquired from Columbia Yachts. It is also related to the Coronado 35 design. The basic design is described as "a well circulated and often modified design, sold under a number of different names".

== Production ==
The design was built by Hughes Boat Works in Canada, but it is now out of production.

== Design ==
The Hughes-Columbia 36 is a recreational keelboat, built predominantly of fibreglass, with wood trim. It has a masthead sloop rig or optional ketch rig, a centre-cockpit, a spooned raked stem, a raised transom, a skeg-mounted spade-type/transom-hung rudder controlled by a wheel and a fixed fin keel. It displaces 15,000 lb (6,804 kg) and carries 6,300 lb (2,858 kg) of ballast.

The boat has a draft of 4.00 ft (1.22 m) with the standard keel fitted. It is fitted with a diesel inboard engine of 22 hp (16 kW) for docking and manoeuvring. The fuel tank holds 44 U.S. gallons (170 L; 37 imp gal) and the water tank holds 55 U.S. gallons (210 L; 46 imp gal).

The design has a hull speed of 7.09 kn (13.13 km/h).

== See also ==
- List of sailing boat types

Related development

- Columbia 34 Mark II
- Coronado 35
- Hughes 36

Similar sailboats

- C&C 34/36
- C&C 35
- C&C 36R
- Cal 35
- Cal 35 Cruise
- Express 35
- Freedom 35
- Goderich 35
- Hunter 35 Legend
- Hunter 35.5 Legend
- Hunter 356
- Island Packet 35
- Landfall 35
- Mirage 35
- Niagara 35
- Pilot 35
- Southern Cross 35
