= Island Packet 35 =

Sailboat class

Development
- Designer: Robert K. Johnson
- Location: United States
- Year: 1988
- No. built: 178
- Builder: Island Packet Yachts
- Role: Cruiser
- Name: Island Packet 35

Boat
- Displacement: 17,500 lb (7,938 kg)
- Draft: 4.50 ft (1.37 m)

Hull
- Type: Monohull
- Construction: Fiberglass
- LOA: 35.33 ft (10.77 m)
- LWL: 30.00 ft (9.14 m)
- Beam: 12.00 ft (3.66 m)
- Engine: Yanmar 35 or 38 hp (26 or 28 kW) diesel engine

Hull appendages
- Keel: long keel
- Ballast: 8,000 lb (3,629 kg)
- Rudder: keel-mounted rudder

Rig
- Rig type: Bermuda rig
- I foretriangle height: 44.33 ft (13.51 m)
- J foretriangle base: 17.00 ft (5.18 m)
- P mainsail luff: 37.50 ft (11.43 m)
- E mainsail foot: 14.00 ft (4.27 m)

Sails
- Sailplan: Cutter rigged sloop
- Mainsail area: 262.50 sq ft (24.387 m^{2})
- Jib/genoa area: 376.81 sq ft (35.007 m^{2})
- Total sail area: 639.31 sq ft (59.394 m^{2})

The Island Packet 35 is an American sailboat that was designed by Robert K. Johnson as a cruiser and first built in 1988.

== Production ==
The design was built by Island Packet Yachts in the United States, with 178 examples completed between 1988 and 1994. It is now out of production.

== Design ==
The Island Packet 35 is a recreational keelboat, built predominantly of fiberglass, with teak wood trim. It has a cutter rig with anodized aluminum spars, a raked stem, a vertical transom, a keel-mounted rudder controlled by a wheel and a fixed long keel or optional long keel with a centerboard. It displaces 17,500 lb (7,938 kg) and carries 8,000 lb (3,629 kg) of ballast. The design features a platform-type bowsprit.

The keel-equipped version of the boat has a draft of 4.50 ft (1.37 m), while the centerboard-equipped version has a draft of 7.2 ft (2.2 m) with the centerboard extended and 3.7 ft (1.1 m) with it retracted.

The boat is fitted with a Japanese Yanmar diesel engine of 35 or 38 hp (26 or 28 kW). The fuel tank holds 48 U.S. gallons (180 L; 40 imp gal) and the fresh water tank has a capacity of 90 U.S. gallons (340 L; 75 imp gal).

The galley is located on the starboard side and includes a three-burner gimballed liquid petroleum gas stove and oven, a double sink with pressurized hot and cold water and 12 cu ft (0.34 m^{3}) icebox. The head is located forward, just aft of the "V"-berth in the bow. Additional sleeping accommodation is provided by an aft private cabin with a double berth, plus the main saloon settees which convert to a single berth on the starboard side and a double on the port, for a total sleeping space for seven people. A navigation station is located on the port side of the cabin. The interior trim is teak with a holly cabin sole.

Ventilation is provided by two opening ports and an overhead hatch in the aft cabin, a hatch and two opening ports in the bow cabin and a hatch and more opening ports in the main cabin.

The cockpit has pedestal-mounted wheel steering, a coldwater shower and a separate icebox.

The jib and boom-mounted staysail have furling systems, while the mainsail has a single-line reefing system. The mainsail is mid-boom sheeted to the cabin roof and has a mainsheet traveler. There are two mast-mounted halyard winches and two cockpit jib winches. The design features double backstays and an adjustable topping lift.

== Operational history ==
In a review in 2000, yacht designer Robert Perry praised the style of the Island Packet 35 and wrote, "the Island Packet combines contemporary hull design with the forgiveness of a long keel to give the owner an easily handled yacht that takes care of itself with little helm assist. This is what a long keel boat should do."

A 2017 review in the Spinsheet said, "I would characterize this design as a conservative, traditional cruiser that is likely to appeal to sailors more interested in comfort than speed made good to weather. The design has quite high freeboard and a high cabin trunk, but these features are disguised by a beautifully drawn sweeping sheerline and bowsprit, which make the boat look longer and lower than it really is ... For coastal cruising and livability aboard a 35-footer, this model has a lot to offer, and the prices reflect Island Packet’s popularity and reputation for solid construction."

== See also ==
- List of sailing boat types

Similar sailboats

- C&C 34/36
- C&C 35
- Cal 35
- Cal 35 Cruise
- Express 35
- Freedom 35
- Goderich 35
- Hughes 36
- Hughes-Columbia 36
- Hunter 35 Legend
- Hunter 35.5 Legend
- Hunter 356
- Landfall 35
- Mirage 35
- Niagara 35
- Southern Cross 35
