= Hughes 36 =

Sailboat class

Development
- Designer: William H. Tripp Jr
- Location: Canada
- Year: 1971
- Builder: Hughes Boat Works
- Name: Hughes 36

Boat
- Displacement: 13,000 lb (5,897 kg)
- Draft: 5.50 ft (1.68 m)

Hull
- Type: Monohull
- Construction: Fibreglass
- LOA: 35.25 ft (10.74 m)
- LWL: 27.50 ft (8.38 m)
- Beam: 10.08 ft (3.07 m)
- Engine: Inboard motor

Hull appendages
- Keel: fin keel
- Ballast: 4,700 lb (2,132 kg)
- Rudder: skeg-mounted rudder

Rig
- Rig type: Bermuda rig

Sails
- Sailplan: Masthead sloop or optional ketch rig
- Total sail area: 500.00 sq ft (46.452 m^{2})

The Hughes 36 is a Canadian sailboat that was designed by William H. Tripp Jr. and first built in 1971.

The Hughes 36 is a development of the Columbia 34 Mark II hull design, being built using tooling and moulds acquired from Columbia Yachts. It is related to the Coronado 35 design. The design was developed into the Hughes-Columbia 36 in 1979.

== Production ==
The design was built by Hughes Boat Works in Canada, but it is now out of production.

== Design ==
The Hughes 36 is a recreational keelboat, built predominantly of fibreglass, with wood trim. It has a masthead sloop rig or optional ketch rig, a centre-cockpit, a spooned raked stem, a raised transom, a skeg-mounted spade-type/transom-hung rudder controlled by a wheel and a fixed fin keel. It displaces 13,000 lb (5,897 kg) and carries 4,700 lb (2,132 kg) of ballast.

The boat has a draft of 5.50 ft (1.68 m) with the standard keel fitted.

The design has a hull speed of 7.03 kn (13.02 km/h).

== See also ==
- List of sailing boat types

Related development

- Columbia 34 Mark II
- Coronado 35
- Hughes-Columbia 36

Similar sailboats

- C&C 34/36
- C&C 35
- C&C 36R
- Cal 35
- Cal 35 Cruise
- Express 35
- Freedom 35
- Goderich 35
- Island Packet 35
- Hunter 35 Legend
- Hunter 35.5 Legend
- Hunter 356
- Landfall 35
- Mirage 35
- Niagara 35
- Pilot 35
- Southern Cross 35
