= Hunter 35 Legend =

Sailboat class

Development
- Location: United States
- Year: 1986
- Builder: Hunter Marine
- Name: Hunter 35 Legend

Boat
- Displacement: 12,100 lb (5,488 kg)
- Draft: 6.50 ft (1.98 m)

Hull
- Type: Monohull
- Construction: Fiberglass
- LOA: 35.58 ft (10.84 m)
- LWL: 29.75 ft (9.07 m)
- Beam: 11.75 ft (3.58 m)
- Engine: Yanmar 3GM 27 hp (20 kW) diesel engine

Hull appendages
- Keel: fin keel
- Ballast: 4,600 lb (2,087 kg)
- Rudder: internally-mounted spade-type rudder

Rig
- Rig type: Bermuda rig
- I foretriangle height: 43.50 ft (13.26 m)
- J foretriangle base: 12.25 ft (3.73 m)
- P mainsail luff: 45.00 ft (13.72 m)
- E mainsail foot: 14.50 ft (4.42 m)

Sails
- Sailplan: Fractional rigged sloop
- Mainsail area: 326.25 sq ft (30.310 m^{2})
- Jib/genoa area: 266.44 sq ft (24.753 m^{2})
- Total sail area: 592.69 sq ft (55.063 m^{2})

The Hunter 35.5 Legend is an American sailboat, that was designed as a cruiser and introduced in 1986.

The Hunter 35 Legend was developed into the Hunter 35.5 Legend in 1989, which replaced it in production.

== Production ==
The boat was built by Hunter Marine in the United States between 1986 and 1989.

== Design ==
The Hunter 35 Legend is a small recreational keelboat, built predominantly of fiberglass, with wood trim. It has a fractional sloop rig, a raked stem, a reverse transom, an internally-mounted spade-type rudder controlled by a wheel and a fixed fin or optionally, winged keel. It displaces 12,100 lb (5,488 kg) and carries 4,600 lb (2,087 kg) of ballast.

The boat has a draft of 6.50 ft (1.98 m) with the standard keel and 4.50 ft (1.37 m) with the optional winged keel.

The boat is fitted with a Japanese Yanmar 3GM diesel engine of 27 hp (20 kW). The fuel tank holds 22 U.S. gallons (83 L; 18 imp gal) and the fresh water tank has a capacity of 64 U.S. gallons (240 L; 53 imp gal).

The design has a hull speed of 7.31 kn (13.54 km/h).

== See also ==
- List of sailing boat types

Related development

- Hunter 35.5 Legend

Similar sailboats

- C&C 34/36
- C&C 35
- C&C 36R
- Cal 35
- Cal 35 Cruise
- Express 35
- Hughes 36
- Hughes-Columbia 36
- Hunter 356
- Island Packet 35
- Landfall 35
- Mirage 35
- Niagara 35
- Southern Cross 35
