= Landfall 35 =

Sailboat class

Development
- Designer: Robert W. Ball of C&C Design
- Location: Canada
- Year: 1979
- Builder: C&C Yachts
- Name: Landfall 35

Boat
- Displacement: 13,000 lb (5,897 kg)
- Draft: 4.83 ft (1.47 m)

Hull
- Type: Monohull
- Construction: Fiberglass
- LOA: 34.92 ft (10.64 m)
- LWL: 26.75 ft (8.15 m)
- Beam: 10.67 ft (3.25 m)
- Engine: Yanmar 3HM 27 hp (20 kW) diesel engine

Hull appendages
- Keel: fin keel
- Ballast: 5,500 lb (2,495 kg)
- Rudder: skeg-mounted rudder

Rig
- Rig type: Bermuda rig

Sails
- Sailplan: Masthead sloop
- Total sail area: 517 sq ft (48.0 m^{2})

The Landfall 35 is a sailboat, that was designed by Robert W. Ball, the chief designer of C&C Design, and first built in 1979. The Landfall series was part of a trend within C&C Yachts to develop more cruising-oriented designs under company president George Cuthbertson's direction during the later 1970s and early 1980s.

== Production ==
The design was built by the Canadian company, C&C Yachts, at their Rhode Island, United States plant, between 1979 and 1984, but it is now out of production.

The boat was produced for yacht charter market, but was also marketed as a couple's cruising sailboat.

== Design ==
The Landfall 35 is a recreational keelboat, built predominantly of fiberglass, with extensive use of balsawood cores. It has a masthead sloop rig, a raked stem, a raised, near-vertical transom, a skeg-mounted spade-type rudder controlled by a wheel and a fixed fin keel. It displaces 13,000 lb (5,897 kg) and carries 5,500 lb (2,495 kg) of ballast.

The boat has a draft of 4.83 ft (1.47 m) with the standard keel and 6.00 ft (1.83 m) with the optional deep-draft keel.

The cabin top fits two teak dorade boxes for ventilation. Features include self tailing winches and a mainsheet traveller.

The boat is fitted with a Japanese Yanmar 3HM diesel engine of 27 hp (20 kW). The fuel tank holds 30 U.S. gallons (110 L; 25 imp gal) and the fresh water tank has a capacity of 64 U.S. gallons (240 L; 53 imp gal).

The design has a hull speed of 6.93 kn (12.83 km/h).

=== Accommodations ===
The boat was built with two interior arrangements, one with a conventional "V" berth forward and the other with a V-shaped couch and dinette table that could be converted into a berth for sleeping. The galley has two stainless steel sinks, a gimbal-mounted three-burner alcohol stove and an oven and a large ice box. The head includes a shower.

== Operational history ==
In a review, Accredited Marine Surveyor Kurtis Samples describes sailing the design: "It was a February day, the winds were 20-25 kts, with gusts to 30 kts, the temperature was 42°F and there were five foot swells with rolling white caps spaced at twenty foot intervals. A great day for sailing. We pointed her into the wind, engine steady at 1000 RPM and hoisted the main. Killed the engine, fell-off about 20 degrees to starboard and let the jenoa roll-on out. She took off quick and we could feel her accelerate ... Close hauled she will sail to within 50 degrees of true wind, but at 60 to 70 degrees is her best point of sail, she heeled gracefully, found her groove, maintained 7.02 kts and rode the waves with little to no pounding. With her high bow she'll split through and roil the waves aside with ease. When the gust came she dipped her teak toecap for few seconds, kissed 37-40 degrees of heel, shook-off the gust and then returned to the original 30 degrees. She did not want to round up, the weather helm was minimal and there were no surprises."

Samples concluded: "the C&C Landfall 35 was a pleasure to sail. She was easy to handle; predictable and forgiving yet had that solid feel of an Island Packet or Valiant. One thing I did observe during the close haul, was a slight side ways slip, which is directly related to the shoal keel."

== See also ==
- List of sailing boat types

Similar sailboats

- C&C 34/36
- C&C 35
- Cal 35
- Cal 35 Cruise
- Express 35
- Freedom 35
- Goderich 35
- Hughes 36
- Hughes-Columbia 36
- Hunter 35 Legend
- Hunter 35.5 Legend
- Hunter 356
- Island Packet 35
- Mirage 35
- Niagara 35
- Pilot 35
- Southern Cross 35
