= Goderich 35 =

Sailboat class

Development
- Designer: Ted Brewer
- Location: Canada
- Year: 1977
- Builder: Huromic Metal Industries Limited
- Role: Cruiser
- Name: Goderich 35

Boat
- Displacement: 17,000 lb (7,711 kg)
- Draft: 4.75 ft (1.45 m)

Hull
- Type: Monohull
- Construction: Steel
- LOA: 35.67 ft (10.87 m)
- LWL: 28.33 ft (8.63 m)
- Beam: 11.50 ft (3.51 m)
- Engine: Volvo 24 hp (18 kW) diesel engine

Hull appendages
- Keel: modified long keel
- Ballast: 6,200 lb (2,812 kg)
- Rudder: skeg-mounted rudder

Rig
- Rig type: Bermuda rig

Sails
- Sailplan: Cutter rigged sloop
- Total sail area: 649.00 sq ft (60.294 m^{2})

The Goderich 35, also known as the Huromic 35, is a Canadian sailboat that was designed by Ted Brewer of Brewer, Walstrom and Associates, as a cruiser and first built in 1977.

== Production ==
The design was built by Huromic Metal Industries Limited in Canada, but it is now out of production.

== Design ==
The Goderich 35 is a recreational keelboat, built predominantly of steel, with wood trim. It has a cutter rig sloop rig, a spooned raked stem, a plumb transom, a keel-mounted rudder controlled by a tiller and a fixed modified long keel, with a cutaway forefoot. It displaces 17,000 lb (7,711 kg) and carries 6,200 lb (2,812 kg) of ballast. The hull is made from steel, painted with urethane paint. Some of the boats were built with 37 foot LOAs, using an extended stern overhang and some were built with ketch rigs.

The boat has a draft of 4.75 ft (1.45 m) with the standard keel fitted.

The cutter staysail is mounted on a boom and the design uses no bowsprit.

The boat is fitted with a Swedish Volvo diesel engine of 24 hp (18 kW) for docking and maneuvering. The fuel tank holds 35 U.S. gallons (130 L; 29 imp gal) and the fresh water tank has a capacity of 75 U.S. gallons (280 L; 62 imp gal).

Below decks sleeping accommodation includes a bow "V"-berth, two main cabin settee berths and a pilot berth aft on the starboard side. The galley is located on the port side, at the foot of the companionway steps. It includes a three-burner stove and 14 cu ft (0.40 m^{3}) icebox. The head is located forward and has a door for access from the main cabin and one from the forward cabin.

Ventilation is provided by five opening ports and five portlights, plus a main cabin hatch.

The steel hull is constructed from welded radius-rolled sheet steel used in the bilge area, in between flatter sheet steel in the sides and hull bottom.

== Operational history ==
Reviewer Richard Sherwood wrote in 1994, "this steel cutter is built in Canada. Stiffness comes from the beam, as the ballast is moderate. The ballast/displacement ratio is 37 percent. To minimize sweating, the hull is insulated with urethane foam."

Marvin Creamer, a geography professor from New Jersey did a circumnavigation in a Goderich 35, Globe Star, starting 21 December 1982 from Cape May, New Jersey, completing the voyage with use of any instruments, save an hourglass to determine watch lengths. The trip was completed on 17 May 1984, after 18 months, including 11 months at sea.

Another Goderich 35, Nomad, was built with aluminum construction for Ed Arnold in Washington state. It was shipped by road to the US east coast and he sailed it to Europe. On the return voyage Arnold sailed it around Cape Horn and on to Sitka, Alaska. He later used the boat to do a solo circumnavigation, intended to be non-stop. He completed it between 1 October 2001 and 6 September 2002, including a month for repairs at the Royal Cape Yacht Club in Cape Town after hitting an iceberg and a stop in Adelaide, Australia, to have his radar repaired.

== See also ==
- List of sailing boat types

Similar sailboats

- C&C 34/36
- C&C 35
- C&C 36R
- Cal 35
- Cal 35 Cruise
- Express 35
- Hughes 36
- Hughes-Columbia 36
- Island Packet 35
- Landfall 35
- Mirage 35
- Niagara 35
- Pilot 35
- Southern Cross 35
