= Hunter 356 =

Sailboat class

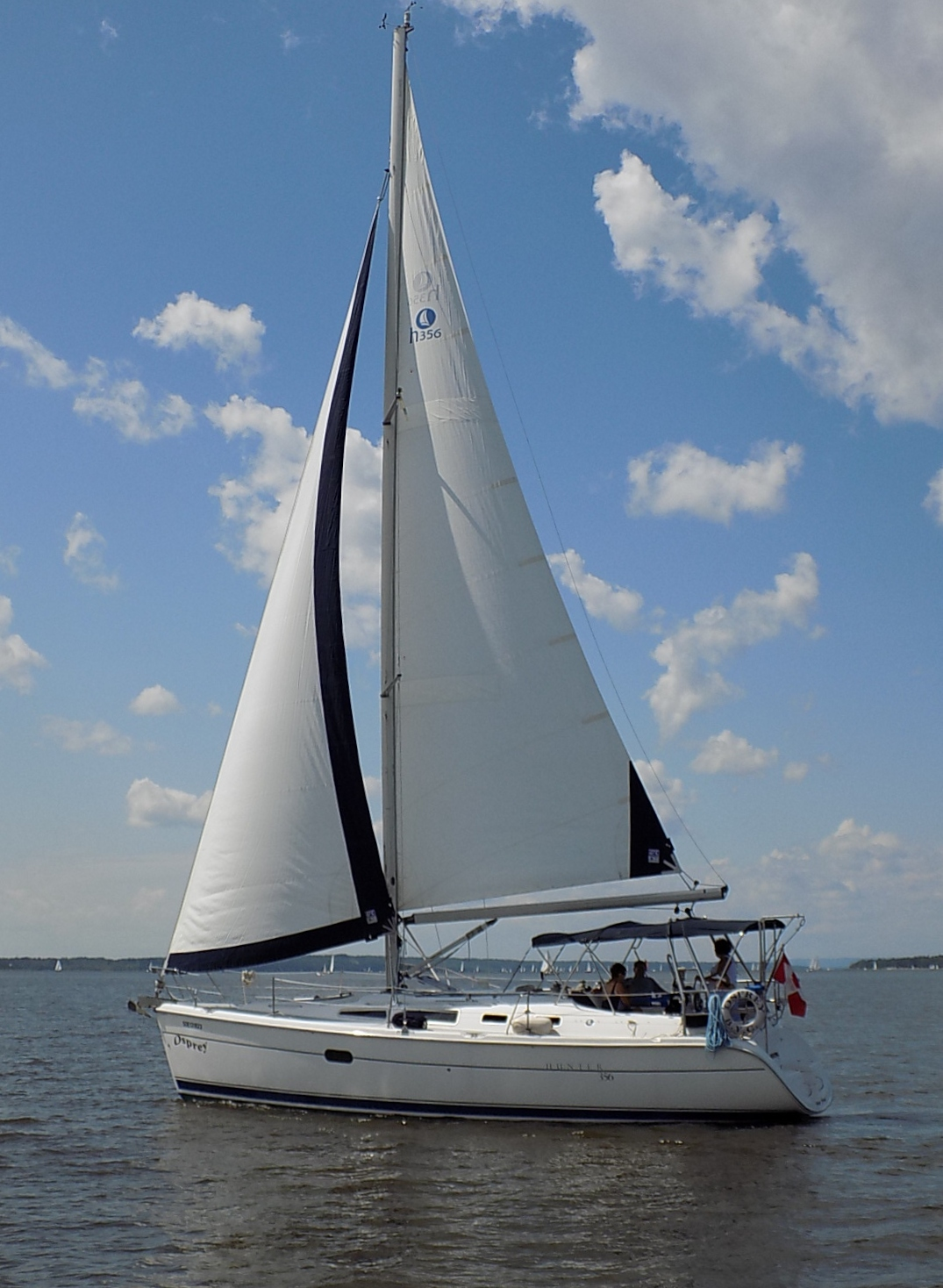

Development
- Designer: Glenn Henderson
- Location: United States
- Year: 2000
- No. built: 500
- Builder: Hunter Marine
- Name: Hunter 356

Boat
- Displacement: 13,900 lb (6,305 kg)
- Draft: 6.42 ft (1.96 m)

Hull
- Type: Monohull
- Construction: Fiberglass
- LOA: 34.50 ft (10.52 m)
- LWL: 30.58 ft (9.32 m)
- Beam: 12.00 ft (3.66 m)
- Engine: Yanmar diesel engine 27 hp (20 kW)

Hull appendages
- Keel: fin keel
- Ballast: 4,000 lb (1,814 kg)
- Rudder: internally-mounted spade-type rudder

Rig
- General: Fractional rigged sloop
- I foretriangle height: 44.83 ft (13.66 m)
- J foretriangle base: 13.16 ft (4.01 m)
- P mainsail luff: 44.92 ft (13.69 m)
- E mainsail foot: 15.00 ft (4.57 m)

Sails
- Mainsail area: 336.90 sq ft (31.299 m^{2})
- Jib/genoa area: 294.98 sq ft (27.405 m^{2})
- Total sail area: 631.88 sq ft (58.704 m^{2})

Racing
- PHRF: 141 (average)

The Hunter 356 is an American sailboat, that was designed by Glenn Henderson and introduced in 2000.

The design forms a scaled series with the Hunter 306 and the 326. The Hunter 356 design was developed into the 2008 Hunter 36-2.

== Production ==
The design was built by Hunter Marine in the United States, starting in 2000, with 500 boats completed, but it is now out of production.

== Design ==
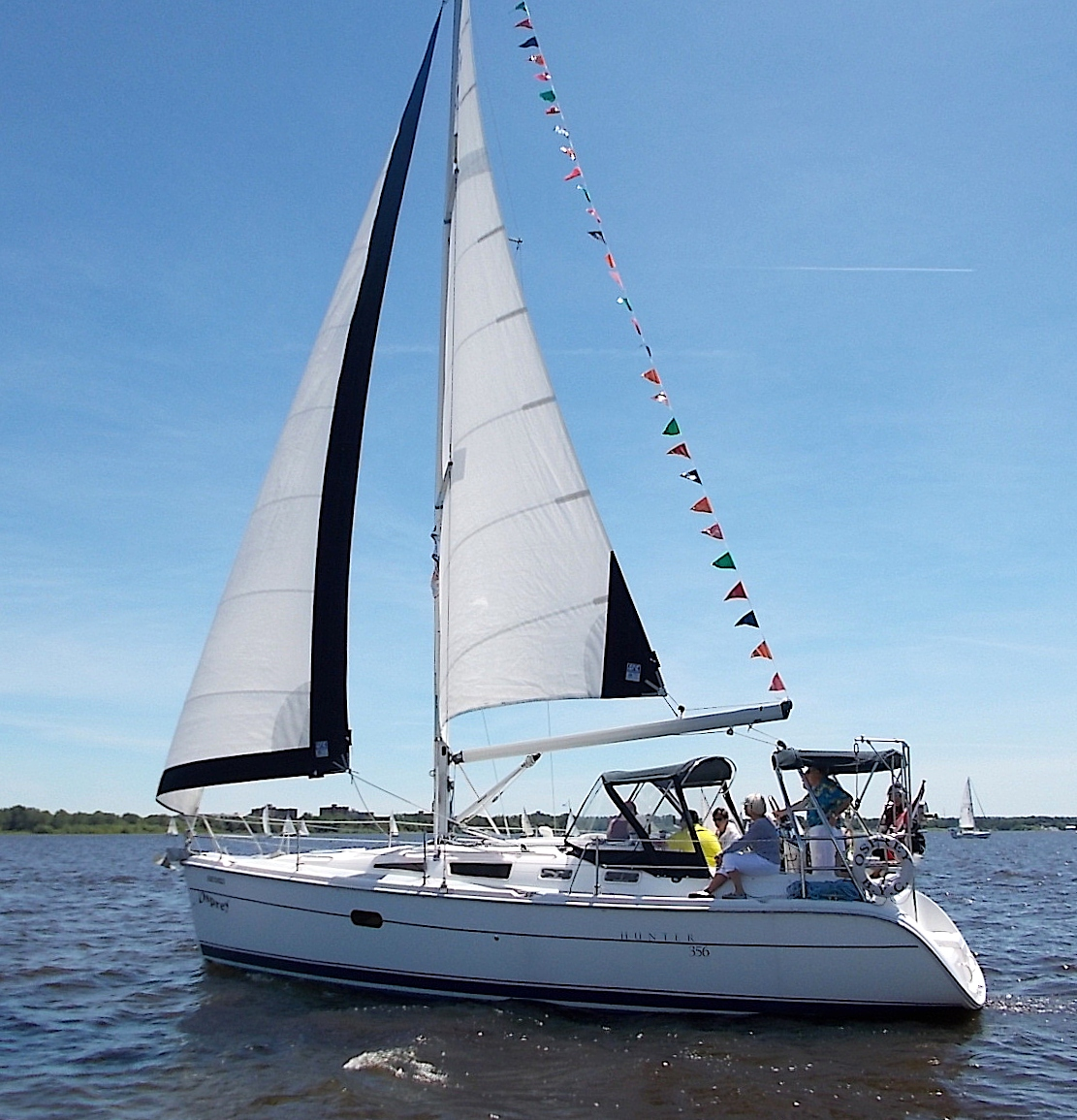
Hunter 356

The Hunter 356 is a recreational keelboat, built predominantly of fiberglass. It has a fractional sloop B&R rig, an internally-mounted spade-type rudder, a reverse transom, a mast-furling mainsail and a fixed fin keel. It displaces 13,900 lb (6,305 kg) and carries 4,000 lb (1,814 kg) of ballast.

The boat has a draft of 6.42 ft (1.96 m) with the standard fin keel. The optional shoal draft keel model has a draft of 5.00 ft (1.52 m)

The boat is fitted with a Japanese Yanmar diesel engine of 27 hp (20 kW). The fuel tank holds 38 U.S. gallons (140 L; 32 imp gal) and the fresh water tank has a capacity of 75 U.S. gallons (280 L; 62 imp gal).

The boat has a PHRF racing average handicap of 141 with a high of 150 and low of 135. It has a hull speed of 7.41 kn (13.72 km/h).

== See also ==
- List of sailing boat types

Related development

- Hunter 306
- Hunter 326

Similar sailboats

- C&C 34/36
- C&C 35
- Express 35
- Freedom 35
- Hughes 36
- Hughes-Columbia 36
- Hunter 35 Legend
- Hunter 35.5 Legend
- Island Packet 35
- Landfall 35
- Mirage 35
