= Freedom 35 =

Sailboat class

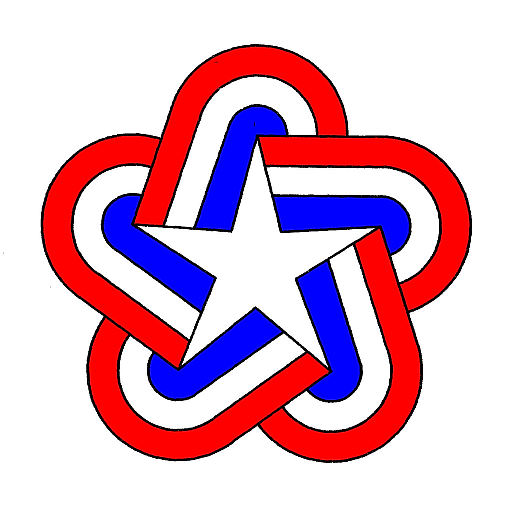

Development
- Designer: David Pedrick
- Location: United States
- Year: 1993
- Builder: Columbia Yachts
- Role: Racer-Cruiser
- Name: Freedom 35

Boat
- Displacement: 14,611 lb (6,627 kg)
- Draft: 6.50 ft (1.98 m)

Hull
- Type: Monohull
- Construction: Fiberglass
- LOA: 35.40 ft (10.79 m)
- LWL: 29.90 ft (9.11 m)
- Beam: 12.00 ft (3.66 m)
- Engine: Yanmar 3GM30F 27 hp (20 kW) diesel engine

Hull appendages
- Keel: fin keel
- Ballast: 4,465 lb (2,025 kg)
- Rudder: internally-mounted spade-type rudder

Rig
- Rig type: Bermuda rig
- I foretriangle height: 39.90 ft (12.16 m)
- J foretriangle base: 11.50 ft (3.51 m)
- P mainsail luff: 45.20 ft (13.78 m)
- E mainsail foot: 16.80 ft (5.12 m)

Sails
- Sailplan: Fractional rigged sloop
- Mainsail area: 379.68 sq ft (35.273 m^{2})
- Jib/genoa area: 229.43 sq ft (21.315 m^{2})
- Total sail area: 609.11 sq ft (56.588 m^{2})

The Freedom 35 is an American sailboat that was designed by David Pedrick as a racer/cruiser and first built in 1993.

== Production ==
The design was built by Tillotson Pearson for Freedom Yachts in the United States starting in 1993, but it is now out of production.

== Design ==
The Freedom 35 is a recreational keelboat, built predominantly of fiberglass with a balsa core, and with wood trim. It has a free-standing (unstayed) fractional sloop rig, a raked stem, a walk-through reverse transom with a swimming platform, an internally mounted spade-type rudder controlled by a wheel and a fixed fin keel or optional wing keel. It displaces 14,611 lb (6,627 kg) and carries 4,465 lb (2,025 kg) of ballast.

The boat has a draft of 6.50 ft (1.98 m) with the standard keel and 4.5 ft (1.4 m) with the optional shoal draft wing keel.

The boat is fitted with a Japanese Yanmar 3GM30F diesel engine of 27 hp (20 kW) for docking and maneuvering. The fuel tank holds 35 U.S. gallons (130 L; 29 imp gal) and the fresh water tank has a capacity of 70 U.S. gallons (260 L; 58 imp gal).

Sleeping accommodations are provided below decks for six people. There is a forward "V"-berth, an aft stateroom, with an athwartship berth and two settee berths in the main cabin. The aft cabin with its athwartship berth results in a wider beam and a wider cockpit above it. There is a stand-up nav station. The galley is at the foot of the companionway steps, on the port side, and includes a two-burner propane stove, an icebox and a double sink. The head is located on the starboard side, opposite the galley and includes a separate shower. Pressurized hot and cold water is optional. The interior is trimmed with cherry wood.

Ventilation is provided by a cabin hatch and there are also two skylights.

All the sheets and halyards are led to the large, T-shaped cockpit, over the cabin roof. There are two genoa winches.

== Operational history ==
In a 1994 review Richard Sherwood wrote, "Freedom Yachts was the first to emphasize free-standing rigs for cruising and continues with this design by David Pedrick. This design, however, is intended for faster sailing than other Freedom designs, such as the 38. The wing keel is designed for shallow-water cruising, and the deep keel for racing. There are racing sail options, such as overlapping jibs, spinnakers, and running backstays for mast control."

Thom Burns, writing in Sailing Breezes, concluded of the design, "The Freedom 35 is a well-built, cruising boat which can be easily handled by a non-athletic couple or single-handed. It affords nice creature comforts while maintaining an essential degree of privacy for two couples or a family out for a couple of weeks. The simplicity of the rig provides for a very uncluttered deck and excellent sailing performance. "

Famed yacht designer Robert Perry reviewed the boat in Sailing magazine in August 2000 and wrote, "the Freedom 35 uses its volume to great advantage and gives us an interior layout that you wouldn't have found in 40-footers 20 years ago. The aft cabin uses an athwartships double berth tucked under the cockpit sole. The head is spacious and includes a shower stall with a nifty wet locker space outboard. The galley is a bit small but there has to be some sacrifice when you put two private sleeping areas into a 35-footer. The nav station faces aft and uses the starboard settee for the seat. The dining table stows neatly out of the way on the forward bulkhead to open up the main cabin. The V-berth area is large and converts to a double berth. Note that the engine is located amidships under the galley counter and settee seat. There is little more you could ask from the layout of a 35-footer."

== See also ==
- List of sailing boat types

Similar sailboats

- C&C 34/36
- C&C 35
- Express 35
- Hughes 36
- Hughes-Columbia 36
- Hunter 356
- Island Packet 35
- Landfall 35
- Mirage 35
