= C&C 35 =

Sailboat class

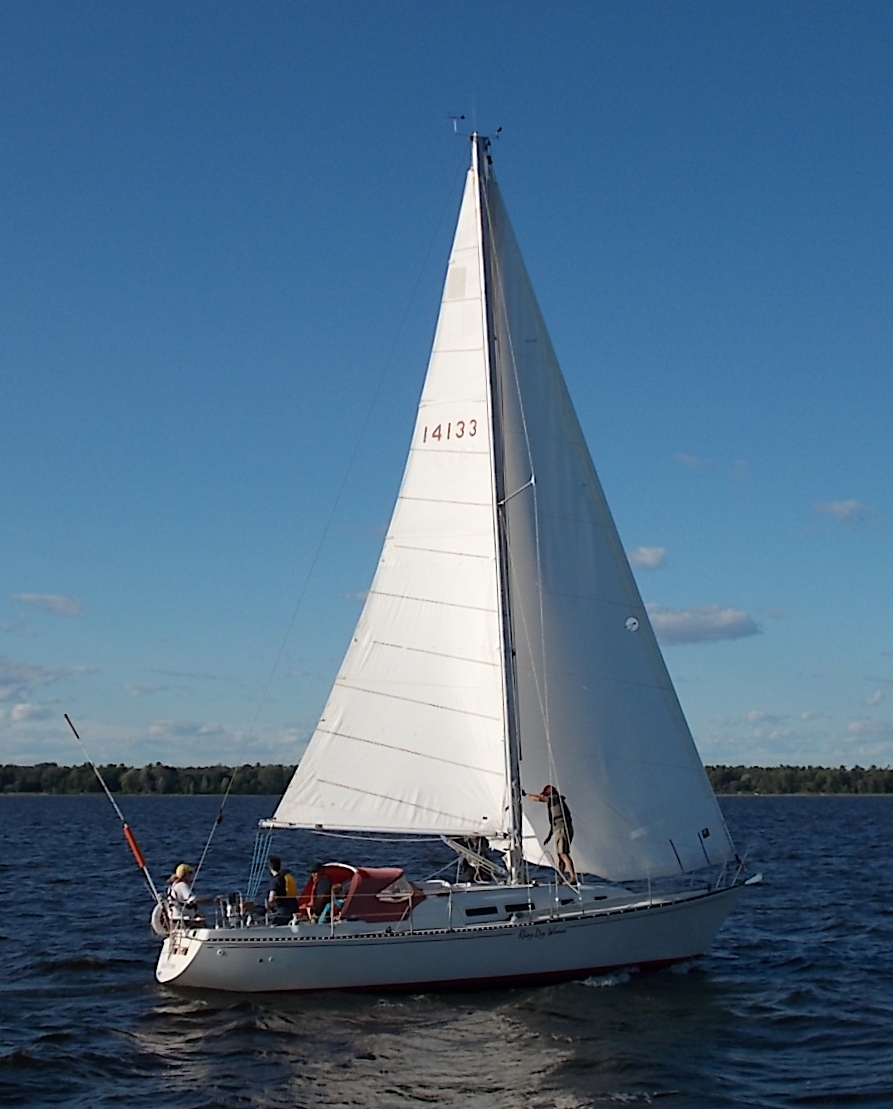
- C&C 35-1

Development
- Designer: Cuthbertson & Cassian (C&C Designs)
- Location: Canada
- Year: 1969
- No. built: 351 (all models)
- Builders: Hinterhoeller Yachts, C&C Yachts
- Name: C&C 35

Boat
- Displacement: 10,500 lb (4,763 kg)
- Draft: 5.25 ft (1.60 m)

Hull
- Type: Monohull
- Construction: Fibreglass
- LOA: 34.58 ft (10.54 m)
- LWL: 27.50 ft (8.38 m)
- Beam: 10.58 ft (3.22 m)
- Engine: Universal Atomic 4 30 hp (22 kW) gasoline engine

Hull appendages
- Keel: fin keel
- Ballast: 5,000 lb (2,268 kg)
- Rudder: internally-mounted spade-type rudder

Rig
- General: Masthead sloop
- I foretriangle height: 44.00 ft (13.41 m)
- J foretriangle base: 14.50 ft (4.42 m)
- P mainsail luff: 38.00 ft (11.58 m)
- E mainsail foot: 13.50 ft (4.11 m)

Sails
- Mainsail area: 256.50 sq ft (23.830 m^{2})
- Jib/genoa area: 319.00 sq ft (29.636 m^{2})
- Total sail area: 575.50 sq ft (53.466 m^{2})

Racing
- PHRF: 129 (average)

The C&C 35, also called the Redwing 35, is a Canadian sailboat, that was designed by Cuthbertson & Cassian (C&C Designs) and first built in 1969.

== Production ==
The boat was initially built in Canada by Hinterhoeller Yachts as the Redwing 35 and later renamed the C&C 35, when Hinterhoeller was merged into C&C Yachts. In all 351 were built of all models, but the design is now out of production.

== Design ==
Developed from the Invader 36, the C&C 35 is a small recreational keelboat, built with a solid fibreglass hull and balsa-cored fibreglass deck. It has a masthead sloop rig, an internally-mounted spade-type rudder and a fixed fin keel.

== Variants ==
C&C 35-1 (Mark 1)
This model was produced from 1969 to 1973. It displaces 10,500 lb (4,763 kg) and carries 5,000 lb (2,268 kg) of lead ballast. The boat has a draft of 5.25 ft (1.60 m) with the standard keel and has a scimitar rudder. The boat has a PHRF racing average handicap of 129 with a high of 135 and low of 120. It has a hull speed of 7.03 kn (13.02 km/h). The boat is fitted with a Universal Atomic 4 gasoline engine of 30 hp (22 kW). The fuel tank holds 20 U.S. gallons (76 L; 17 imp gal) and the fresh water tank has a capacity of 26 U.S. gallons (98 L; 22 imp gal).
C&C 35-2 (Mark 2)
This model was produced from 1973 to 1975 and was an improved Mark 1. It displaces 13,800 lb (6,260 kg), carries 5,620 lb (2,549 kg) of ballast and has a more conventional partially balanced spade rudder. The boat has a draft of 5.58 ft (1.70 m). The boat has a PHRF racing average handicap of 126 with a high of 139 and low of 123. It has a hull speed of 7.36 kn (13.63 km/h). The boat is fitted with a Universal Atomic 4 gasoline engine of 30 hp (22 kW), although a Westerbeke diesel engine was a later option.
C&C 35-3 (Mark 3)
This model was produced from 1982 to 1987 and was a completely new design by Robert W. Ball of C&C. It displaces 10,825 lb (4,910 kg) and carries 4,500 lb (2,041 kg) of ballast. The boat has a draft of 6.08 ft (1.85 m) with the standard fixed fin keel and 6.4 ft (2.0 m) with the optional centreboard/keel. The draft is 4.16 ft (1.27 m) with the centreboard up. The boat has a PHRF racing average handicap of 132 with a high of 132 and low of 135. It has a hull speed of 7.09 kn (13.13 km/h). The boat is fitted with a Japanese Yanmar 3GM30F diesel engine. The fuel tank holds 20 U.S. gallons (76 L; 17 imp gal) and the fresh water tank has a capacity of 30 U.S. gallons (110 L; 25 imp gal).

== See also ==
- List of sailing boat types

Similar sailboats

- C&C 34/36
- C&C 36R
- Cal 35
- Cal 35 Cruise
- Express 35
- Freedom 35
- Goderich 35
- Hughes 36
- Hughes-Columbia 36
- Hunter 35 Legend
- Hunter 35.5 Legend
- Hunter 356
- Island Packet 35
- Landfall 35
- Mirage 35
- Niagara 35
- Pilot 35
- Southern Cross 35
