= Cal 35 Cruise =

Sailboat class

Development
- Designer: William Lapworth
- Location: United States
- Year: 1973
- No. built: 120
- Builder: Columbia Yachts
- Role: Cruiser
- Name: Cal 35 Cruise

Boat
- Displacement: 15,000 lb (6,804 kg)
- Draft: 4.67 ft (1.42 m)

Hull
- Type: Monohull
- Construction: Fiberglass
- LOA: 35.08 ft (10.69 m)
- LWL: 28.75 ft (8.76 m)
- Beam: 11.00 ft (3.35 m)
- Engine: Perkins Engines 4-107 50 hp (37 kW) diesel engine

Hull appendages
- Keel: fin keel
- Ballast: 5,000 lb (2,268 kg)
- Rudder: internally-mounted spade-type rudder

Rig
- Rig type: Bermuda rig
- I foretriangle height: 42.00 ft (12.80 m)
- J foretriangle base: 14.00 ft (4.27 m)
- P mainsail luff: 36.00 ft (10.97 m)
- E mainsail foot: 14.00 ft (4.27 m)

Sails
- Sailplan: Masthead sloop
- Mainsail area: 252.00 sq ft (23.412 m^{2})
- Jib/genoa area: 294.00 sq ft (27.313 m^{2})
- Total sail area: 546.00 sq ft (50.725 m^{2})

The Cal 35 Cruise is an American sailboat that was designed by C. William Lapworth as a cruiser and first built in 1973.

The Cal 35 Cruise is sometimes confused with the later Cal 35 series of sailboats.

== Production ==
The design was built by Cal Yachts in the United States. Production was started in 1973 and ended in 1974, with a total of 120 examples of the design produced.

== Design ==
The Cal 35 Cruise is a recreational keelboat, built predominantly of fiberglass, with wood trim. It has a masthead sloop rig or optional ketch rig, with a keel-stepped mast. The boat has a raked stem, a plumb transom, an internally mounted spade-type rudder controlled by a wheel and a fixed fin keel. It displaces 15,000 lb (6,804 kg) and carries 5,000 lb (2,268 kg) of ballast.

The boat has a draft of 4.67 ft (1.42 m) with the standard keel fitted.

The boat is fitted with a British Perkins Engines 4-107 diesel engine of 50 hp (37 kW) for docking and maneuvering. The engine is located under the companionway steps.

The design has a raised saloon top, with the galley on the port side at the foot of the companionway steps. The head is located forward, just aft of the bow "V"-berth and also on the port side. A dinette table is fitted in the main cabin. Opening hatches are provided for ventilation in the forward cabin and the main cabin.

The design has a hull speed of 7.18 kn (13.30 km/h).

== Variants ==
Cal 35 Cruise Sloop
This model was introduced in 1973 and has a masthead sloop rig.
Cal 35 Cruise Ketch
This model was also introduced in 1973 and has a mizzen mast with a sail luff of 18.00 ft (5.49 m) and a foot of 6.36 ft (1.94 m).

== See also ==
- List of sailing boat types

Similar sailboats

- C&C 34/36
- C&C 35
- Express 35
- Goderich 35
- Hughes 36
- Hughes-Columbia 36
- Hunter 35 Legend
- Hunter 35.5 Legend
- Island Packet 35
- Landfall 35
- Mirage 35
- Pilot 35
