= Coronado 35 =

Sailboat class

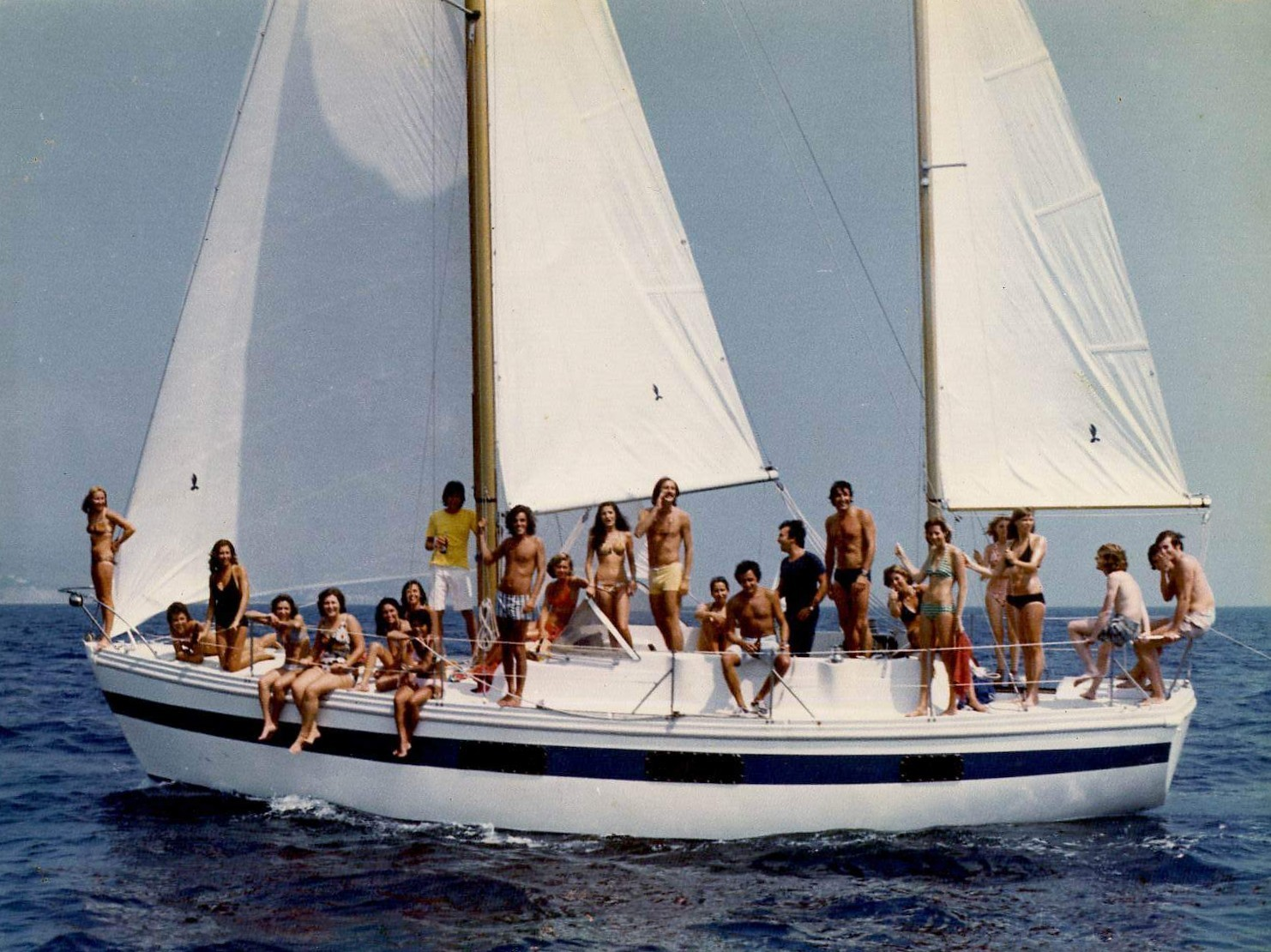
- A Coronado 35 ketch with 24 people on deck

Development
- Designer: William H. Tripp Jr.
- Location: United States
- Year: 1971
- Builder: Coronado Yachts
- Name: Coronado 35

Boat
- Displacement: 13,000 lb (5,897 kg)
- Draft: 5.50 ft (1.68 m)

Hull
- Type: Monohull
- Construction: Fiberglass
- LOA: 35.25 ft (10.74 m)
- LWL: 27.50 ft (8.38 m)
- Beam: 10.08 ft (3.07 m)
- Engine: Palmer P-60 gasoline engine

Hull appendages
- Keel: fin keel
- Ballast: 4,700 lb (2,132 kg)
- Rudder: skeg-mounted rudder

Rig
- Rig type: Ketch rig
- I foretriangle height: 38.00 ft (11.58 m)
- J foretriangle base: 13.80 ft (4.21 m)
- P mainsail luff: 32.00 ft (9.75 m)
- E mainsail foot: 12.00 ft (3.66 m)

Sails
- Sailplan: Masthead rig ketch
- Mainsail area: 192.00 sq ft (17.837 m^{2})
- Jib/genoa area: 262.20 sq ft (24.359 m^{2})
- Total sail area: 454.20 sq ft (42.197 m^{2})

The Coronado 35 is an American sailboat that was designed by William H. Tripp Jr. as a cruiser and first built in 1971.

The Coronado 35 design was developed into the Portman 36 in 1978 and later into the Watkins 36 and the Watkins 36C.

== Development ==
The Coronado 35's hull is mostly likely derived from the moulds used for the 1970 vintage, Tripp-designed Columbia 34 Mark II, which were also used for the Hughes 36 and the Hughes-Columbia 36.

== Production ==
The design was built by Coronado Yachts in the United States between 1971 and 1976, but it is now out of production.

== Design ==
The Coronado 35 is a recreational keelboat, built predominantly of fiberglass, with wood trim. It has a center-cockpit ketch rig or an optional masthead sloop rig, a spooned raked stem, a raised transom, a skeg-mounted rudder controlled by a wheel and a fixed fin keel. It displaces 13,000 lb (5,897 kg) and carries 4,700 lb (2,132 kg) of ballast.

The boat has a draft of 5.50 ft (1.68 m) with the standard deep draft keel and 3.8 ft (1.2 m) with the optional shoal draft keel.

The boat is fitted with a Palmer P-60 gasoline engine for docking and maneuvering. The fuel tank holds 29 U.S. gallons (110 L; 24 imp gal) and the fresh water tank also has a capacity of 29 U.S. gallons (110 L; 24 imp gal).

The design has a hull speed of 7.03 kn (13.02 km/h).

== Variants ==
Coronado 35
The ketch-rigged model with a total sail area of 535 sq ft (49.7 m^{2}).
Coronado 35 MS
The masthead sloop-rigged model with a total sail area of 502 sq ft (46.6 m^{2}).

== See also ==
- List of sailing boat types

Related development

- Hughes 36
- Hughes-Columbia 36
- Portman 36
- Watkins 36
- Watkins 36C

Similar sailboats

- Bayfield 36
- Beneteau 361
- C&C 36-1
- C&C 36R
- Catalina 36
- Columbia 36
- CS 36
- Ericson 36
- Frigate 36
- Hunter 36
- Hunter 36-2
- Hunter 36 Legend
- Hunter 36 Vision
- Invader 36
- Islander 36
- Nonsuch 36
- S2 11.0
- Seidelmann 37
