= Thomas C. Gillmer =

- Born: July 17, 1911; Warren, Ohio
- Died: December 16, 2009 (aged 98); Annapolis, Maryland
- Education: U.S. Naval Academy
- Spouse: Ruth Newsome
- Engineering career
- Discipline: Marine Engineering
- Practice name: Thomas Gillmer, Naval Architect, Inc.
- Projects: Ship Hydromechanics Laboratory (U.S. Naval Academy)
- Significant design: Pride of Baltimore and Kalmar Nyckel

Thomas C. Gillmer (1911–2009) was a naval architect and the author of books about modern and historical naval architecture. He was born in Warren, Ohio on July 17, 1911.

== Early life ==
At his family's summer cottage near Lake Erie in Ohio, he learned to sail a 14-foot sloop by himself. He graduated from Warren High School, then attended the U.S. Naval Academy.

== Career ==
After graduating from the U.S. Naval Academy in 1935, he served aboard the light cruisers USS Raleigh (CL-7) and USS Savannah (CL-42) in the Pacific and Mediterranean.

In 1941, he joined the Marine Engineering Department at the Naval Academy. During World War II, he served as an instructor of Ship Construction and Damage Control at the U.S. Naval Academy. He resigned his commission with the Navy in 1946 to join the academy's faculty as a professor and became chairman of the First Class Committee of the Marine Engineering department. (Note: The Marine Engineering Department became the Division of Engineering and Weapons in 1970 which contained the Naval Systems Engineering Department. Naval Systems later became the current Naval Architecture and Ocean Engineering Department.) During the 1950s, Professor Gillmer established the Ship Hydromechanics Laboratory in Isherwood Hall which consisted of an 85' × 6' × 4' towing tank, an 18' × 22' × 4' intact and damaged stability demonstration tank and a small circulating water channel.

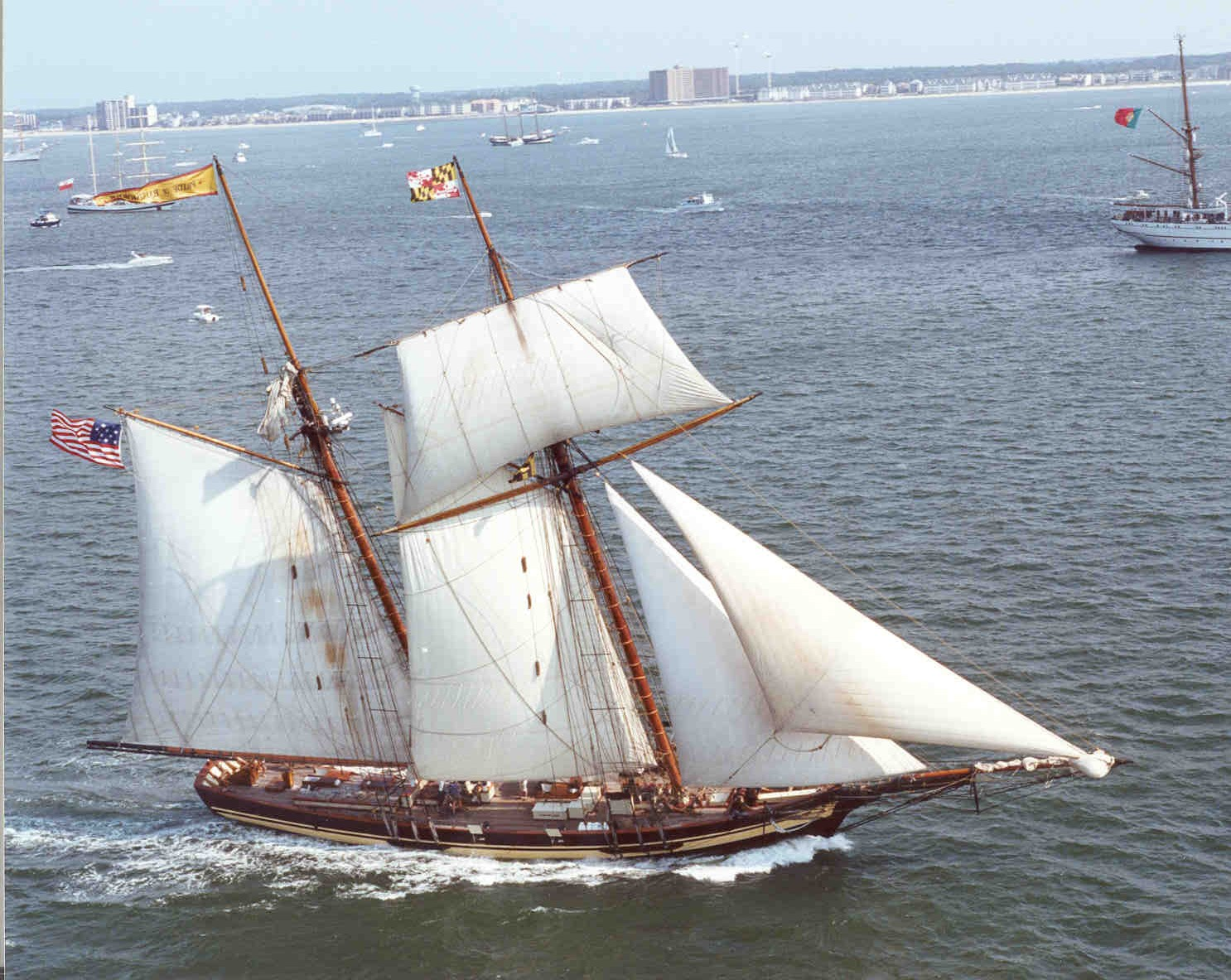
Pride of Baltimore II

After retiring from the Naval Academy in 1967, Gillmer continued living in Annapolis, where he pursued a career as the architect of sailing vessels and an author on the subject. In 1969, he established the engineering firm Thomas Gillmer, Naval Architect, Inc. in Annapolis. His designs included modern yachts and replicas of historic sailing ships. He worked with artist Melbourne Smith on the design of the Pride of Baltimore in 1976, the Pride of Baltimore II in 1986, and the Kalmar Nyckel in 1997, and brought Capt.Iver Franzen into his firm in 1986 to assist with the latter two projects, among others. The Navy hired Gillmer and Franzen to evaluate the condition of the USS Constitution prior to the vessel's restoration in 1997.

The Allied Seawind Ketch, designed by Gillmer in 1962, was the first fiberglass-hulled yacht to circumnavigate the Earth.

Gillmer designed and built his own house in Annapolis in 1947, where he lived for more than 60 years. He was married for 62 years to the former Anna Derge. After her death in 1999, he married Ruth Newsome, who was his wife until he died on December 16, 2009.

== Bibliography ==
=== Books ===
- Simplified Theory of Flight, with Erich Nietch, D. Van Nostrand Company, Inc. (1942)
- Clouds, Weather and Flight, with Erich Nietch, D. Van Nostrand Company, Inc. (1944)
- Fundamentals of Naval Construction and Damage Control, with Jamie Adair, U.S. Naval Institute Press (1949 and 1951)
- Fundamentals of construction and stability of naval ships, United States Naval Institute (1956, revised 1959)
- Working watercraft: a survey of the surviving local boats of America and Europe, International Marine Pub. Co. (1972), ISBN 0-87742-025-4
- Brigs & Sloops of the American Navy, with Melbourne Smith, Admiralty Pub. House LTD (1973)
- Ships of the American Revolution, with Melbourne Smith, Admiralty Pub. House LTD (1973)
- Modern Ship Design, Second Edition, U.S. Naval Institute Press (1970, revised 1975)
- Cruising designs from the board of Thomas C. Gillmer, Seven Seas Press (1975)
- Introduction to Naval Architecture, with Bruce Johnson, Naval Institute Press (1982), ISBN 0-87021-318-0
- Chesapeake Bay Sloops, Chesapeake Bay Maritime Museum (1982)
- Sailing With Pride, with Greg Pease (Photographer) and Barbara Bozzuto (co-author) (1990)
- Pride of Baltimore: The Story of the Baltimore Clippers, 1800-1990, International Marine Publishing (1992), ISBN 0-87742-309-1
- Old Ironsides: the rise, decline, and resurrection of the USS Constitution, International Marine (1993), ISBN 0-87742-346-6
- History of Working Watercraft of the Western World, the McGraw-Hill Companies (1994), ISBN 0-07-023616-X
- Old Ironsides, International Marine/Ragged Mountain Press (1997), ISBN 0-07-024564-9

=== Video ===
- Maritime archaeology and ship preservation, U.S. Naval Academy (1998), with Dana M. Wegman, Patrick Otton, Robert O. Dulin, William H. Garzke, Peter K. Hus, and Timothy J Runyan

== Vessel designs ==
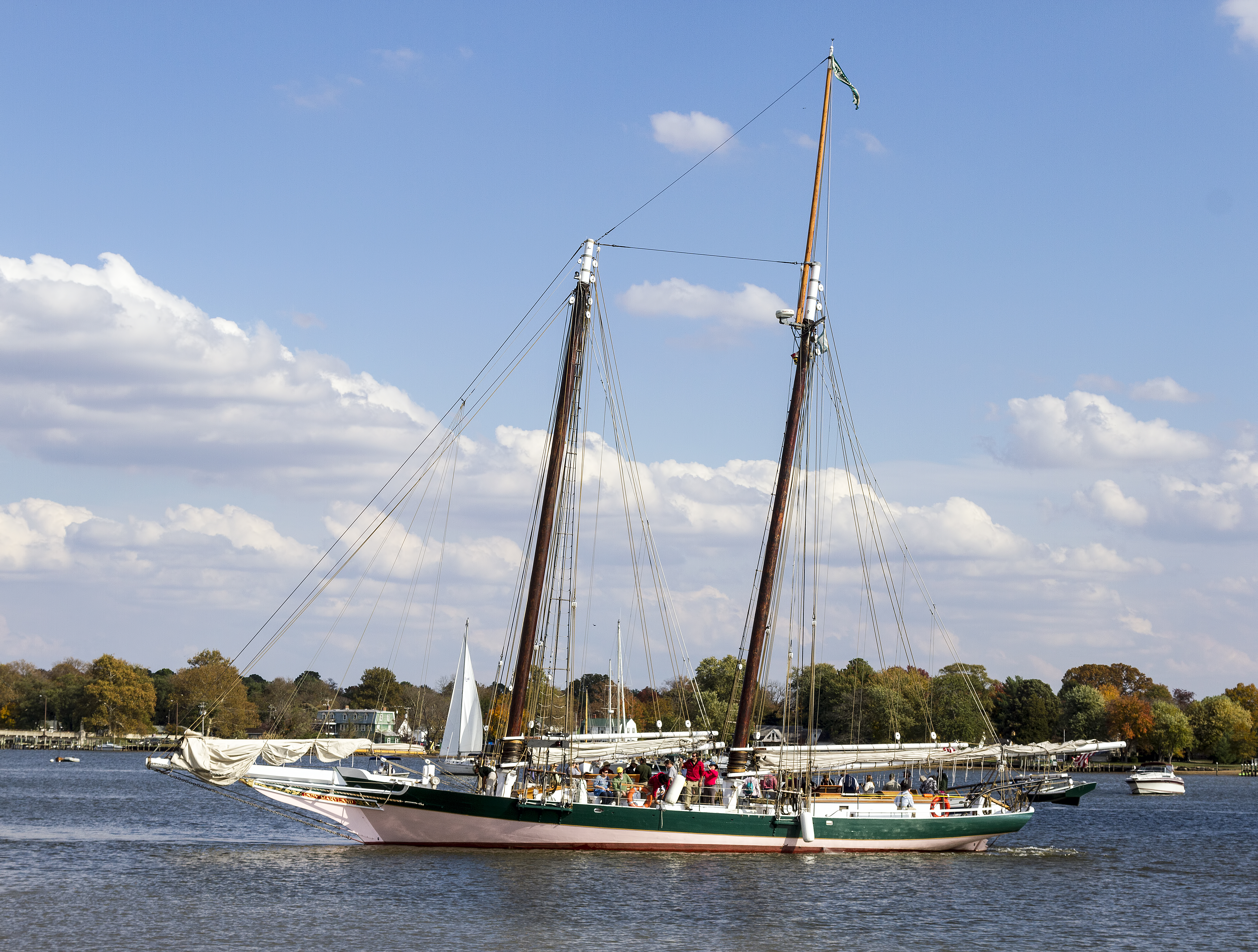
The Lady Maryland on the Chester River, 2013

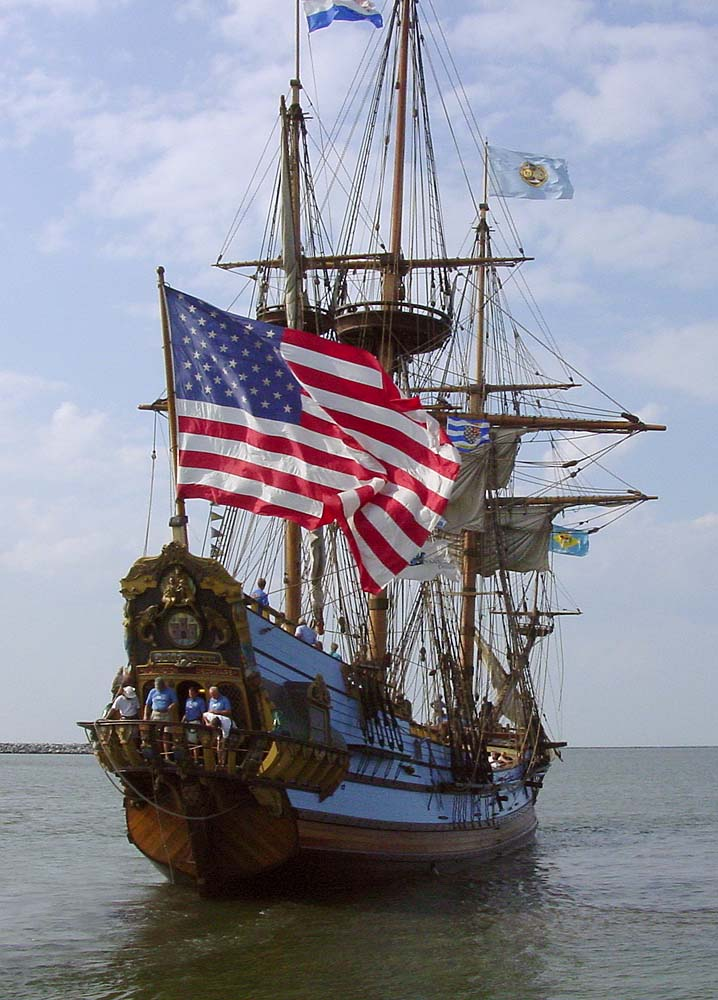
The Kalmar Nyckel

=== Historic sailing ship replicas ===
Vessel design	Year designed	Overall length	Type
Pride of Baltimore	1976	90 feet	Topsail Schooner
Lady Maryland	1979	104 feet	Pungy Schooner
Pride of Baltimore II	1986	157 feet	Topsail Schooner
Kalmar Nyckel	1997	93 feet	Pinnace

=== Sailboats ===
Vessel design	Year designed
Blue Moon 23	1943
Blue Water 24	1961
Allied Seawind Ketch	1962
Allied Seawind Sloop	1962
Sirenita 30	1965
Privateer 26	1966
Privateer 35	1968
Aries 32	1972
Seawind Mk 32 Sloop	1975
Seawind Mk 32 Ketch	1975
Roughwater 33	1975
Southern Cross 31	1977
Southern Cross 28	1978
Southern Cross 35	1978
Passage 24	1979
Southern Cross 39	1981
Weatherly 32	1983

Source of table data:
