= Mirage 35 =

Sailboat class

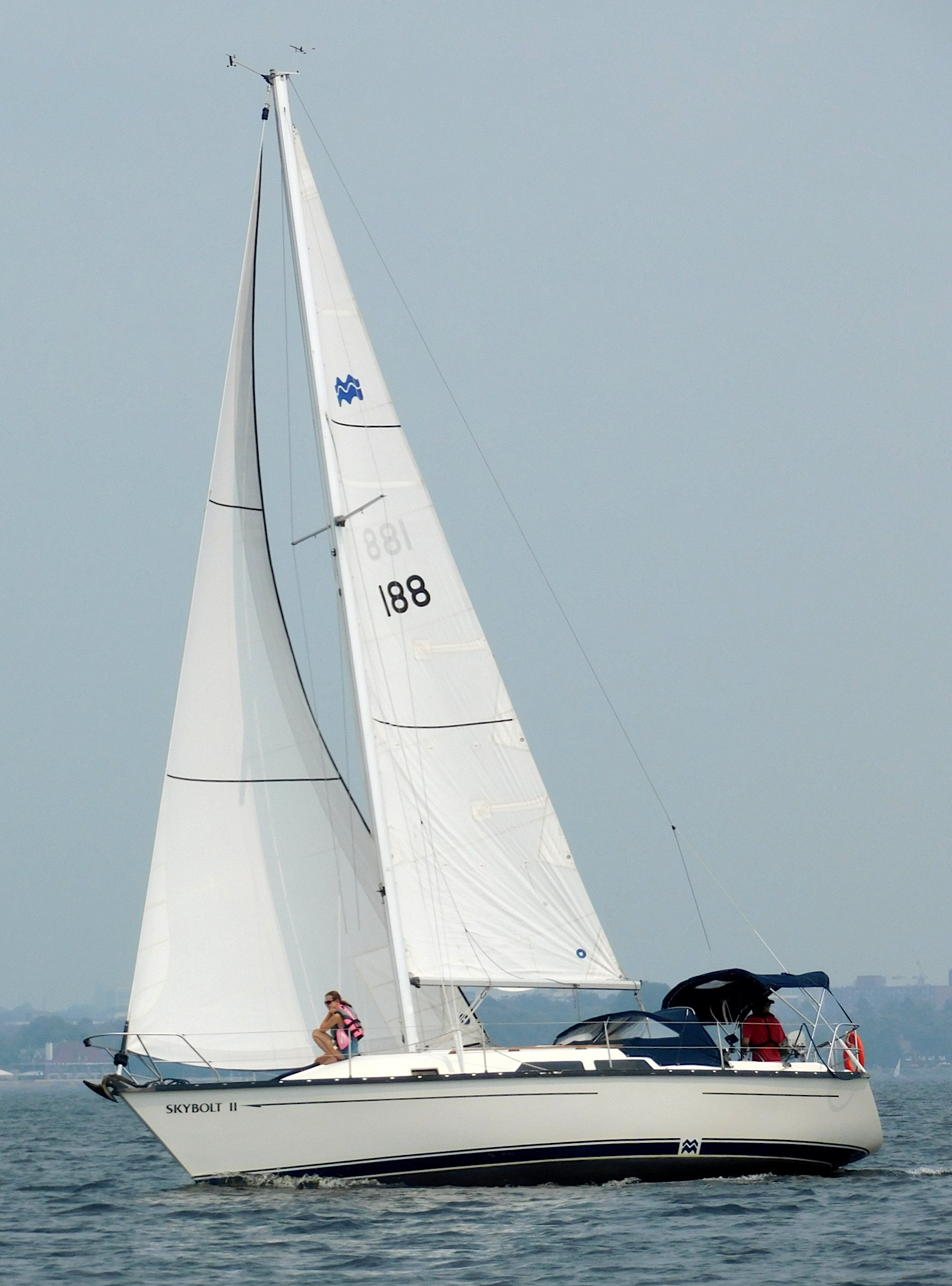

Development
- Designer: Robert Perry
- Location: Canada
- Year: 1982
- Builder: Mirage Yachts
- Name: Mirage 35

Boat
- Displacement: 10,000 lb (4,536 kg)
- Draft: 5.00 ft (1.52 m)

Hull
- Type: Monohull
- Construction: Fibreglass
- LOA: 35.50 ft (10.82 m)
- LWL: 26.75 ft (8.15 m)
- Beam: 11.67 ft (3.56 m)
- Engine: Volvo diesel engine

Hull appendages
- Keel: fin keel
- Ballast: 3,500 lb (1,588 kg)
- Rudder: internally-mounted spade-type rudder

Rig
- General: Masthead sloop
- I foretriangle height: 42.00 ft (12.80 m)
- J foretriangle base: 13.00 ft (3.96 m)
- P mainsail luff: 35.50 ft (10.82 m)
- E mainsail foot: 11.00 ft (3.35 m)

Sails
- Mainsail area: 195.25 sq ft (18.139 m^{2})
- Jib/genoa area: 273.00 sq ft (25.363 m^{2})
- Total sail area: 468.25 sq ft (43.502 m^{2})

Racing
- PHRF: 150 (average)

The Mirage 35 is a Canadian sailboat, that was designed by American Robert Perry and first built in 1983.

The Mirage 35 design was developed from the Mirage 33 of 1982.

== Production ==
The boat was built by Mirage Yachts in Canada, starting in 1983, but it is now out of production.

== Design ==
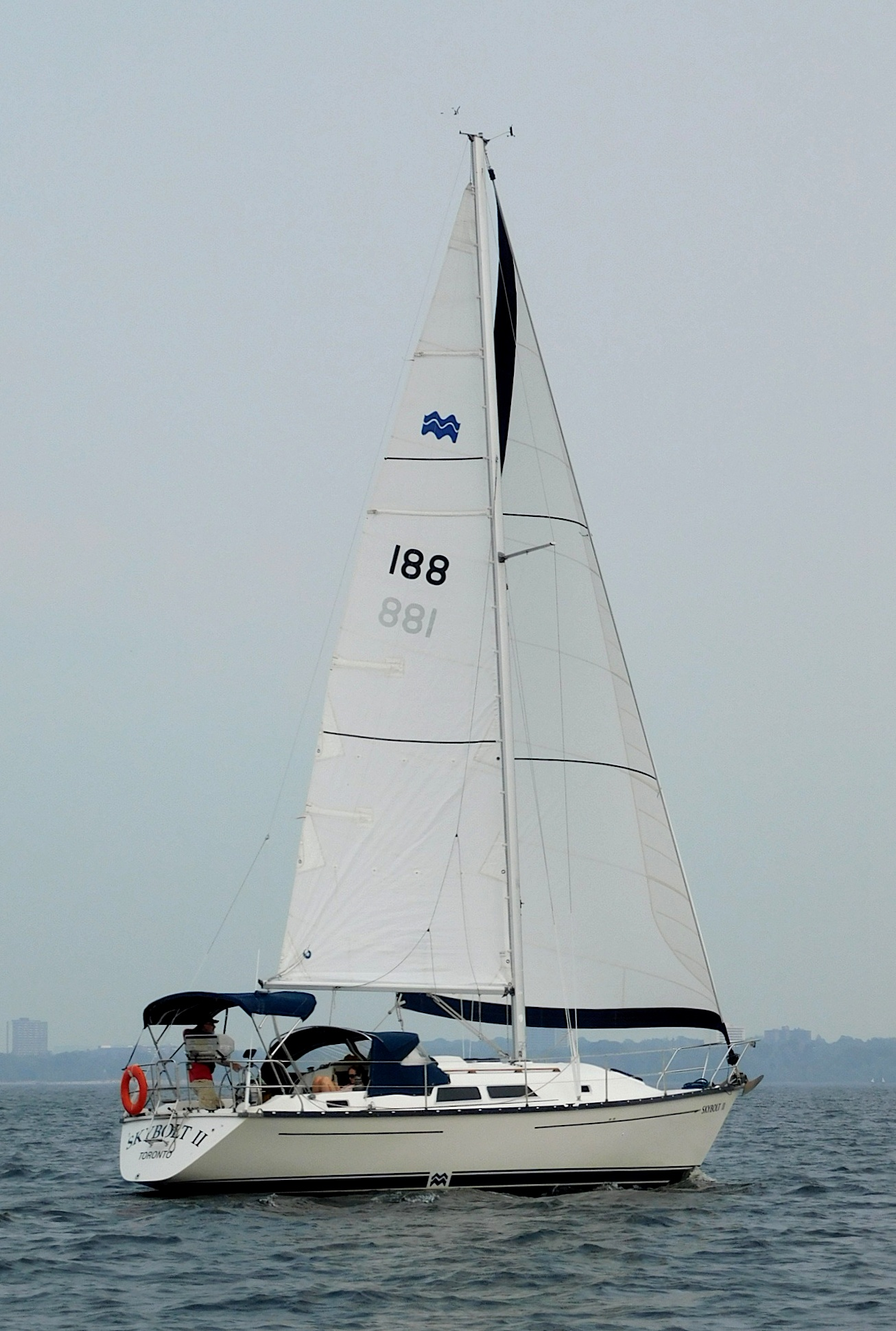
Mirage 35 showing reverse transom

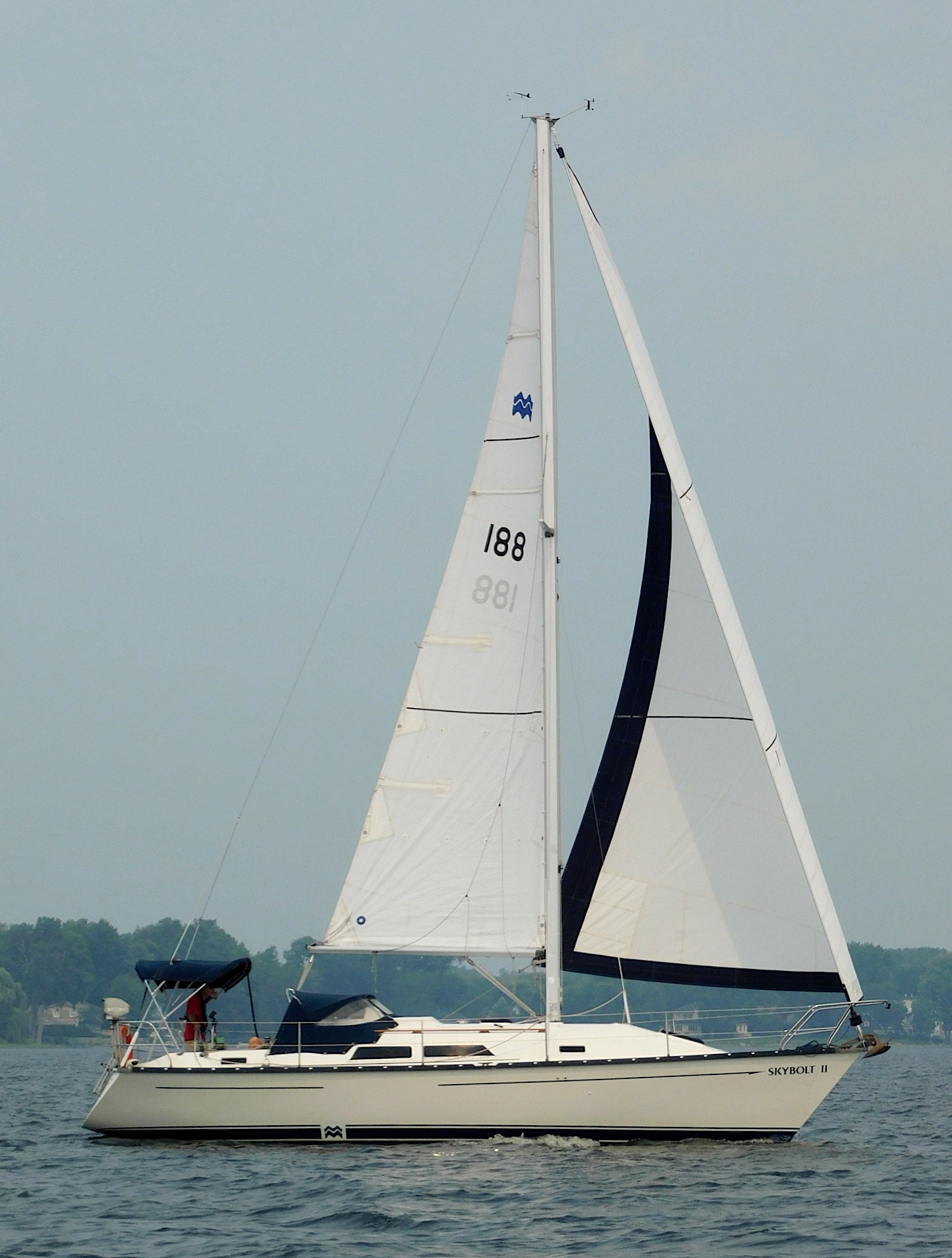
Mirage 35

The Mirage 35 differs from the very similar Miarge 33 only in fitting a reverse transom, which adds 2.00 ft (0.61 m) to the length overall, but does not affect the boat's other dimensions.

It is a small recreational keelboat, built predominantly of fibreglass. It has a masthead sloop rig, an internally-mounted spade-type rudder and a fixed fin keel. It displaces 10,000 lb (4,536 kg) and carries 3,500 lb (1,588 kg) of ballast.

The boat has a draft of 5.00 ft (1.52 m) with the standard keel and mounts a Volvo diesel engine. The fuel tank holds 20 U.S. gallons (76 L; 17 imp gal) and the fresh water tank has a capacity of 40 U.S. gallons (150 L; 33 imp gal).

The boat has a PHRF racing average handicap of 150 with a high of 156 and low of 144. It has a hull speed of hull speed of 6.93 kn (12.83 km/h).

== Operational history ==
In a review Michael McGoldrick wrote, "For all practical purposes, the Mirage 33 and 35 are the same boat. The water line, sail area, beam, draft, and interior layout of these two boats is identical. The main difference is that the Mirage 35 has a reverse transom, weighs a few hundred pounds more, and has an overall length that's two feet longer than the 33 foot model. The 35 footer is also supposed to have been built with a slightly nicer interior. These boats have a fairly large interior which featured 6' 5" (1.96m) of headroom. In their day, the beams of these boats would have been considered slightly wider than average, and this would have been especially true of the 33 foot model."

== See also ==
- List of sailing boat types

Related development

- Mirage 33

Similar sailboats

- C&C 34/36
- C&C 36R
- C&C 35
- Cal 35
- Cal 35 Cruise
- Express 35
- Freedom 35
- Goderich 35
- Hughes 36
- Hughes-Columbia 36
- Hunter 35 Legend
- Hunter 35.5 Legend
- Hunter 356
- Island Packet 35
- J/35
- Landfall 35
- Niagara 35
- Southern Cross 35
