= Hunter 36 Legend =

Sailboat class

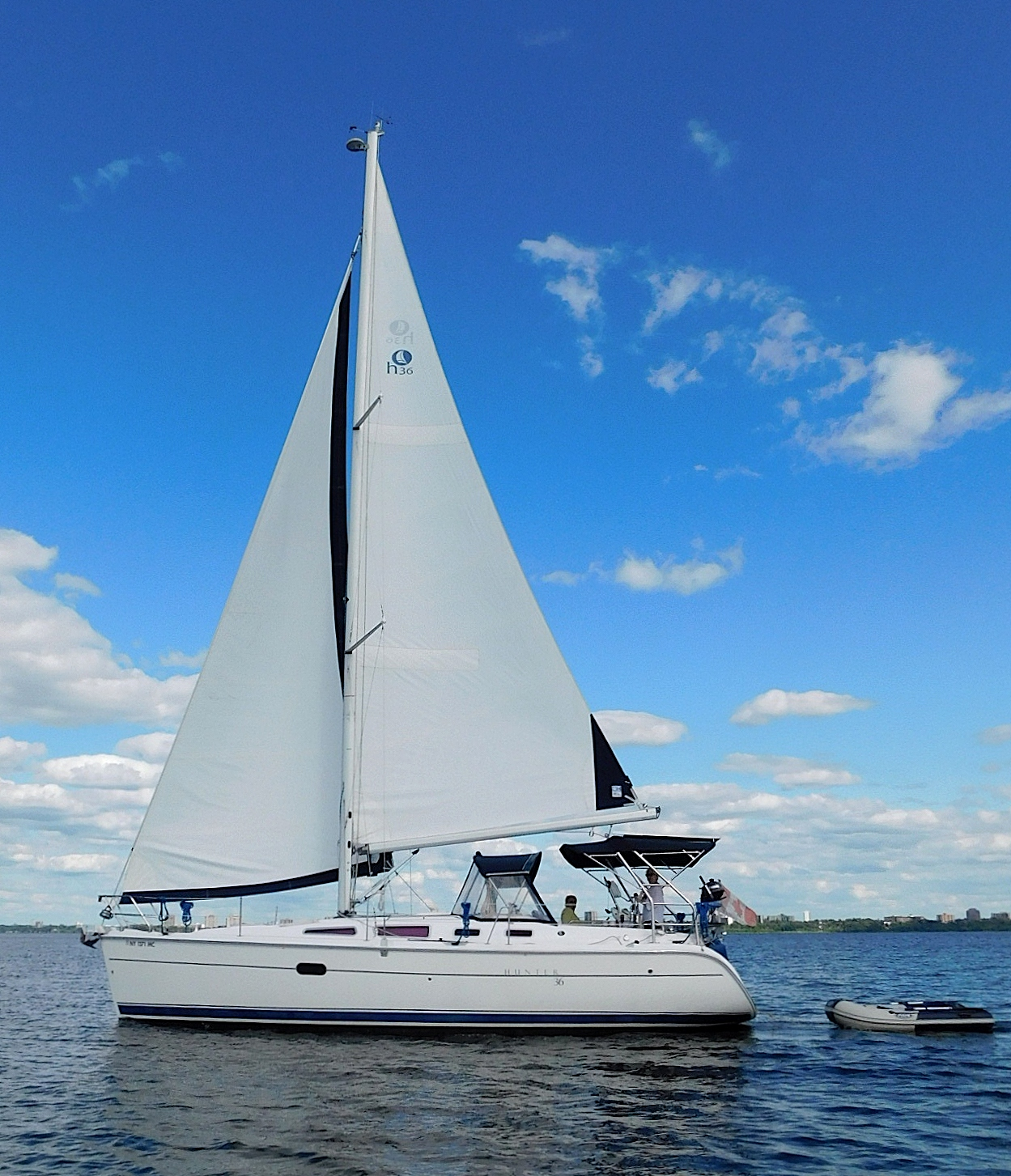

Development
- Designer: Glenn Henderson
- Location: United States
- Year: 2001
- Builder: Hunter Marine
- Name: Hunter 36 Legend

Boat
- Displacement: 14,330 lb (6,500 kg)
- Draft: 6.82 ft (2.08 m)

Hull
- Type: Monohull
- Construction: Fiberglass
- LOA: 35.73 ft (10.89 m)
- LWL: 31.53 ft (9.61 m)
- Beam: 12.34 ft (3.76 m)
- Engine: Inboard motor

Hull appendages
- Keel: fin keel
- Ballast: 5,132 lb (2,328 kg)
- Rudder: internally-mounted spade-type rudder

Rig
- General: B&R rig
- Rig type: Bermuda rig
- I foretriangle height: 44.82 ft (13.66 m)
- J foretriangle base: 13.16 ft (4.01 m)
- P mainsail luff: 44.92 ft (13.69 m)
- E mainsail foot: 15.00 ft (4.57 m)

Sails
- Sailplan: Fractional rigged sloop
- Mainsail area: 336.90 sq ft (31.299 m^{2})
- Jib/genoa area: 294.92 sq ft (27.399 m^{2})
- Total sail area: 631.82 sq ft (58.698 m^{2})

The Hunter 36 Legend is an American sailboat, that was designed by Glenn Henderson and first built in 2001.

The design can be confused with the 1980 Hunter 36, 2008 Hunter 36-2 (sold as the Hunter 36) and the 1990 Hunter 36 Vision, all sailboats with similar names by the same builder.

== Production ==
The design was built by Hunter Marine in the United States, but it is now out of production.

== Design ==
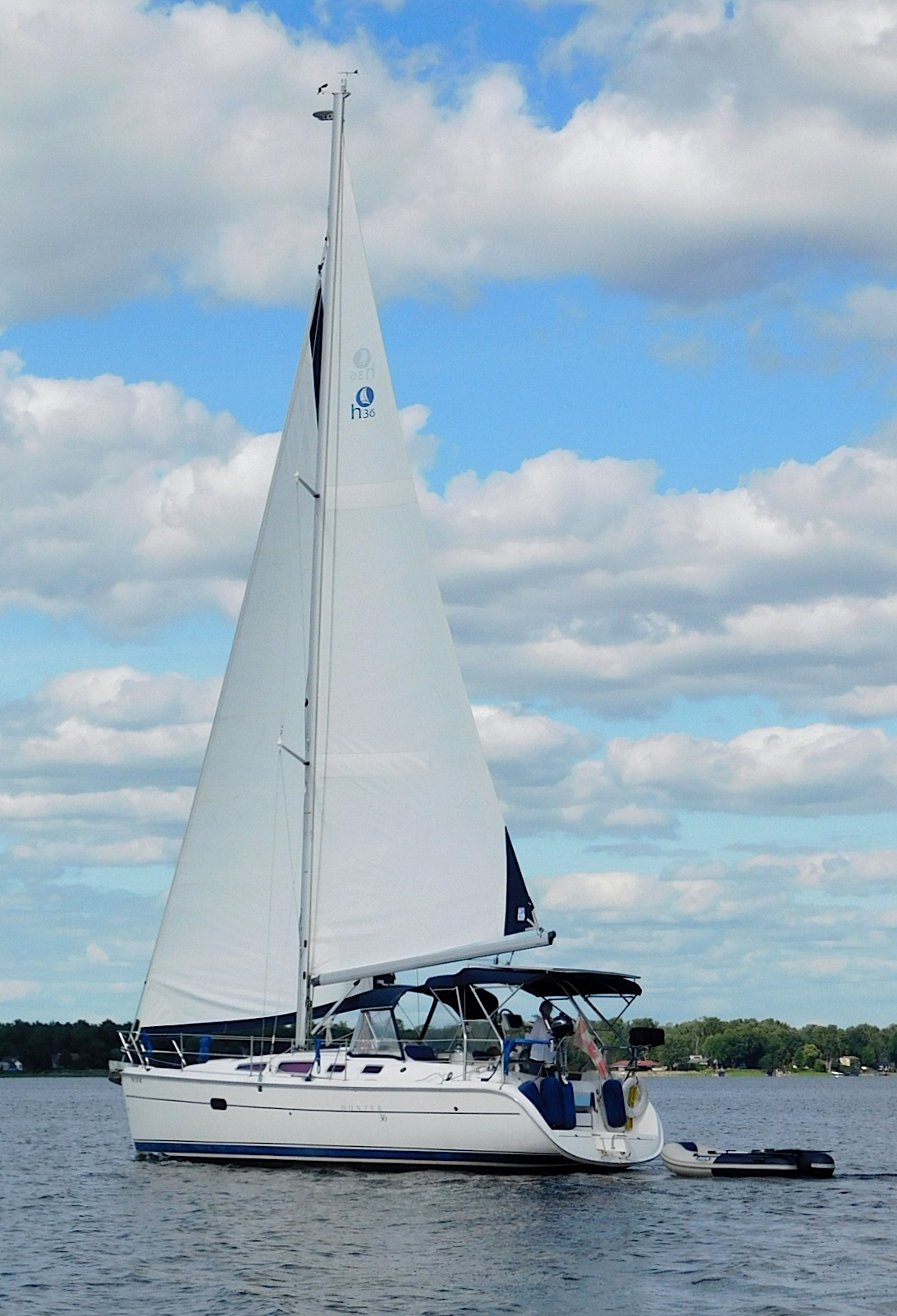
Hunter 36 Legend, showing walk-through transom configuration

The Hunter 36 Legend is a recreational keelboat, built predominantly of fiberglass.

The design has a fractional sloop B&R rig, a nearly-plumb stem, a walk-through reverse transom, an internally-mounted spade-type rudder controlled by a wheel and a fixed fin keel or wing keel. It displaces 14,330 lb (6,500 kg) and carries 5,132 lb (2,328 kg) of ballast.

The boat has a draft of 6.82 ft (2.08 m) with the standard keel and 5.00 ft (1.52 m) with the optional shoal draft winged keel.

The boat is fitted with an inboard engine. The fuel tank holds 37 U.S. gallons (140 L; 31 imp gal) and the fresh water tank has a capacity of 75 U.S. gallons (280 L; 62 imp gal).

The design has a hull speed of 7.52 kn (13.93 km/h).

== See also ==
- List of sailing boat types

Similar sailboats

- Beneteau 361
- C&C 36-1
- C&C 36R
- C&C 110
- Catalina 36
- Columbia 36
- Coronado 35
- CS 36
- Ericson 36
- Frigate 36
- Hunter 36
- Hunter 36-2
- Hunter 36 Vision
- Islander 36
- Nonsuch 36
- Portman 36
- S2 11.0
- Seidelmann 37
- Watkins 36
- Watkins 36C
