= Blue Water 24 =

Sailboat class

Development
- Designer: Thomas C. Gillmer
- Location: United States
- Year: 1961
- Builder: Blue Water Boats/Holden Laminates
- Role: Cruiser
- Name: Blue Water 24

Boat
- Displacement: 7,950 lb (3,606 kg)
- Draft: 4.08 ft (1.24 m)

Hull
- Type: monohull
- Construction: fiberglass
- LOA: 24.00 ft (7.32 m)
- LWL: 19.67 ft (6.00 m)
- Beam: 8.58 ft (2.62 m)
- Engine: Universal Atomic 4 30 hp (22 kW) gasoline engine

Hull appendages
- Keel: long keel
- Ballast: 3,000 lb (1,361 kg)
- Rudder: keel-mounted rudder

Rig
- Rig type: Bermuda rig

Sails
- Sailplan: masthead sloop
- Total sail area: 276.00 sq ft (25.641 m^{2})

The Blue Water 24 is an American trailerable sailboat that was designed by Thomas C. Gillmer as a blue water cruiser and first built in 1961.

The design was developed into the Passage 24 in 1979, using a new coach house on the existing hull design.

== Production ==
The Blue Water 24 design was a commission by Blue Water Boats who had it built by Holden Laminates in the United States starting in 1961, but it is now out of production.

== Design ==
The Blue Water 24 is a recreational keelboat, built predominantly of fiberglass, with wood trim. It has a masthead sloop rig and can also be cutter rigged. The hull has a raked stem, an angled transom, a keel-mounted rudder controlled by a tiller and a fixed long keel. It displaces 7,950 lb (3,606 kg) and carries 3,000 lb (1,361 kg) of ballast.

The boat has a draft of 4.08 ft (1.24 m) with the standard keel.

The boat is fitted with a Universal Atomic 4 30 hp (22 kW) gasoline engine for docking and maneuvering. The fuel tank holds 15 U.S. gallons (57 L; 12 imp gal) and the fresh water tank has a capacity of 20 U.S. gallons (76 L; 17 imp gal).

The design has sleeping accommodation for four people, with a double "V"-berth in the bow cabin and two quarter berths in the main cabin. The galley is located on the port side just aft of the bow cabin. The head is located opposite the galley on the starboard side. Cabin headroom is 73 in (190 cm).

For sailing the design is equipped with a large headsail genoa and a 3/4 jib, that can be used in any combinations.

The design has a hull speed of 5.9 kn (10.9 km/h).

== Operational history ==
In a 2010 review Steve Henkel wrote, "best features: The broad bowsprit with a pulpit extended over it gives good purchase for dealing with an anchor We also like the big portlights in the doghouse, the better to check out one’s neighbors in a cozy anchorage. Worst features: ... Of the four comp[etitor]s listed below, the Blue Water 24 has by far the least enticing accommodations plan. For example, there appears to be no dining table, nor any place to put one. And the enclosed head compartment is located smack dab amidships, leaving only an 18-inch space to stand in front of the galley."

== See also ==
- List of sailing boat types
