= Boom vang =

Sailboat rigging component

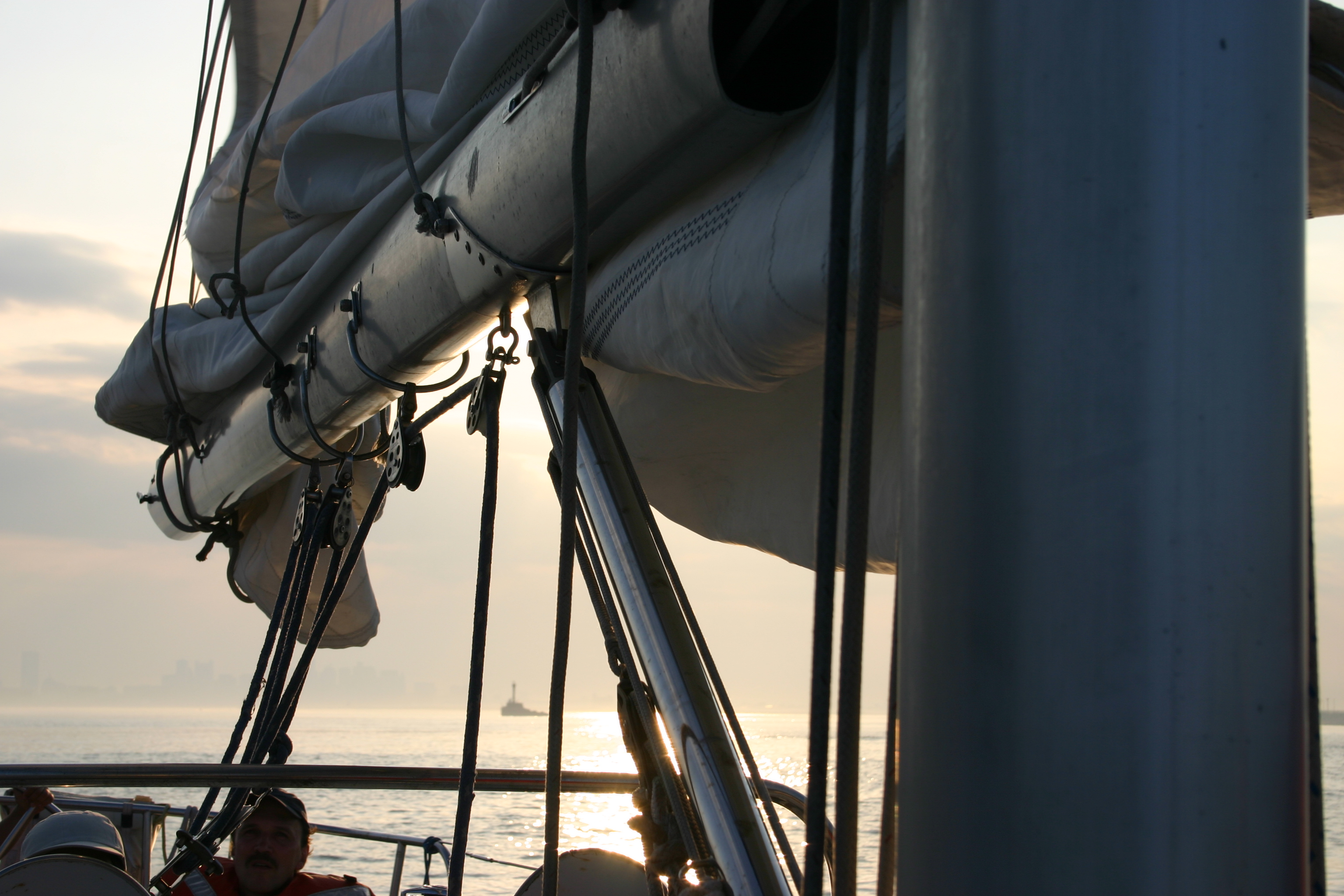
On larger sailboats, the boom vang is often a combination of a spring-loaded telescopic tube to support the boom and a pulley system to tighten the vang as shown in this picture.

A boom vang (US) or kicking strap (UK) (often shortened to "vang" or "kicker") is a line or piston system on a sailboat used to exert downward force on the boom and thus control the shape of the sail. The Collins English Dictionary defines it as "A rope or tackle extended from the boom of a fore-and-aft mainsail to a deck fitting of a vessel when running, in order to keep the boom from riding up".

The vang typically runs from the base of the mast to the boom. Due to the great force necessary to change the height of the boom while a boat is under sail, a line-based boom vang usually includes some sort of a pulley system. Hydraulic piston vangs are used on larger sailboats and controlled by manual or electric hydraulic pumps.

By controlling leech tension, the boom vang is one way of controlling sail twist. The boom vang may also be used to flatten the mainsail on dinghies.

On small sailboats and some cruising sailboats a vang may be omitted. If a vang is not installed, then the mainsheet has to try to control both horizontal and vertical angles of the boom. When the boom is near the centerline, the mainsheet is nearly vertical, and can exert downward force on the boom. As the mainsheet is loosened to increase the horizontal angle of the boom and sail, the mainsheet becomes horizontal and exerts less downward force. A vang works with the mainsheet to apply the downward force on the boom at all horizontal angles, allowing the mainsheet to be used to control the horizontal angle of the boom effectively.

While under sail, the opposite force to the vang is supplied by the sail itself. When the sail is furled, a topping lift supplies the upward force on the boom. Some line vang systems incorporate a piston to provide the topping lift force and to damp oscillations. Hydraulic vangs can inherently act in the topping lift role.

A gnav (the word vang spelt backwards) is an inverted vang. It is a rigid strut that extends obliquely upward from the boom to the mast, exerting a force that pushes down on the boom. As the fixing point of the gnav on the boom is hauled inwards towards the mast, the downward force on the boom increases. A gnav offers more uncluttered space beneath the boom when compared to a vang.
