= Topping lift =

Line in a sailboat's rigging

The topping lift indicated

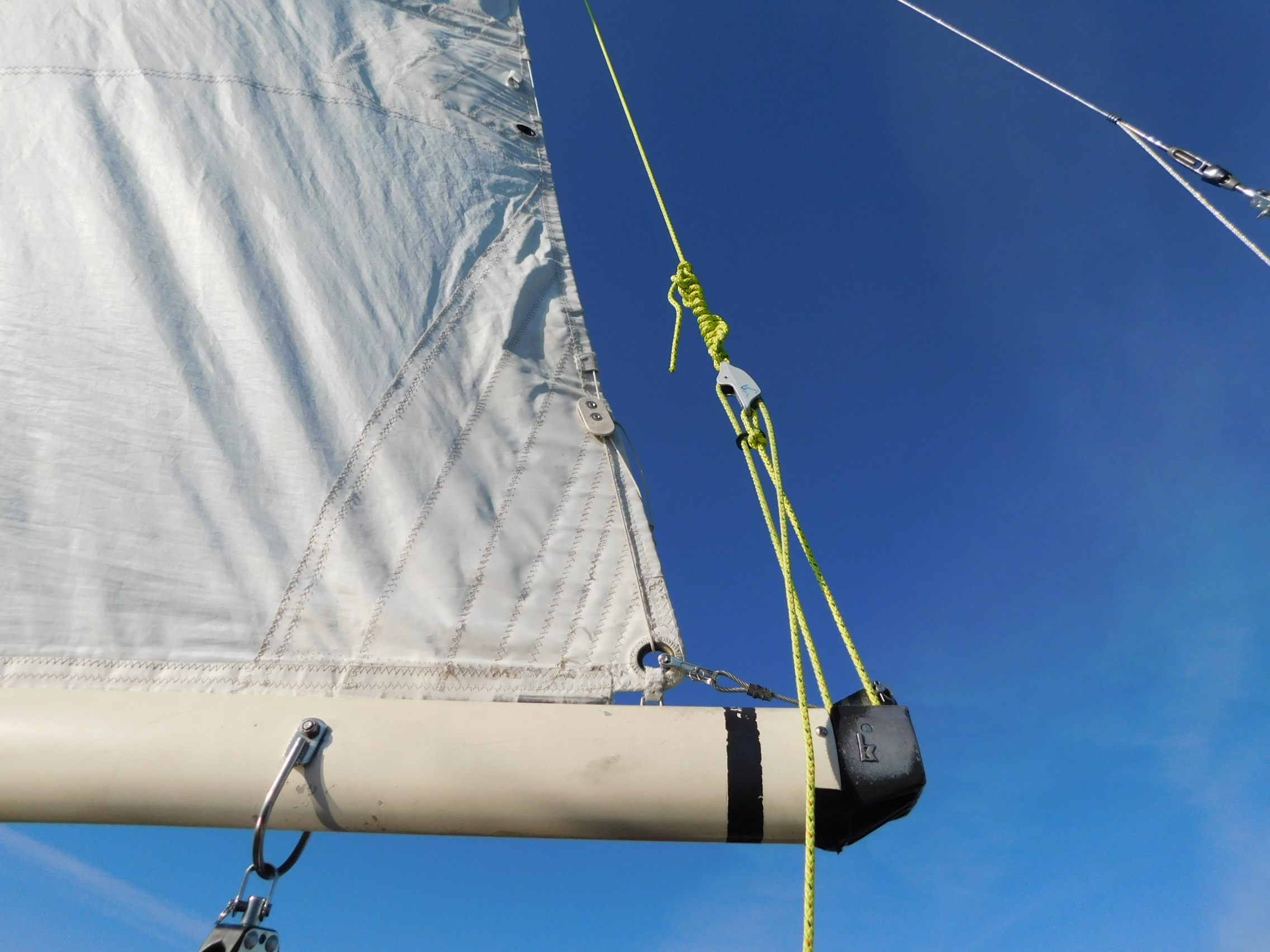
Topping lift on a US Yachts US 22 sailboat

The topping lift (more rarely known as an uphaul) is a line which applies upward force on a boom on a sailboat.

Part of the running rigging, topping lifts are primarily used to hold a boom up when the sail is lowered. This line would run from near the free end of the boom(s) forward to the top of the mast. The line may be run over a block at the top of the mast and down to the deck to allow it to be adjusted. For small booms, the topping lift may be run from end of the boom to the backstay or next mast aft. When the sail is raised again, the topping lift is loosened or removed. On sailboats used for racing, boom lift function is frequently incorporated into the boom vang system, to reduce the number of lines aloft. Allowing the vang to take this function also simplifies operation of the boat.

On larger or older sailing vessels, lifts known as "quarter-lifts" run to the middle of the boom. When the sail is raised, the quarter-lift on the leeward side must be slack, otherwise it will cut into the sail and cause it to lose its shape. When tacking, the new windward lift must be tightened and the new leeward lift let out.

A topping lift may also refer to a line on the front of the mast used to rig the spinnaker pole. It is used to trim the pole to the proper height when hoisting the spinnaker.
