= Express 35 =

1980s Canadian recreational keelboat

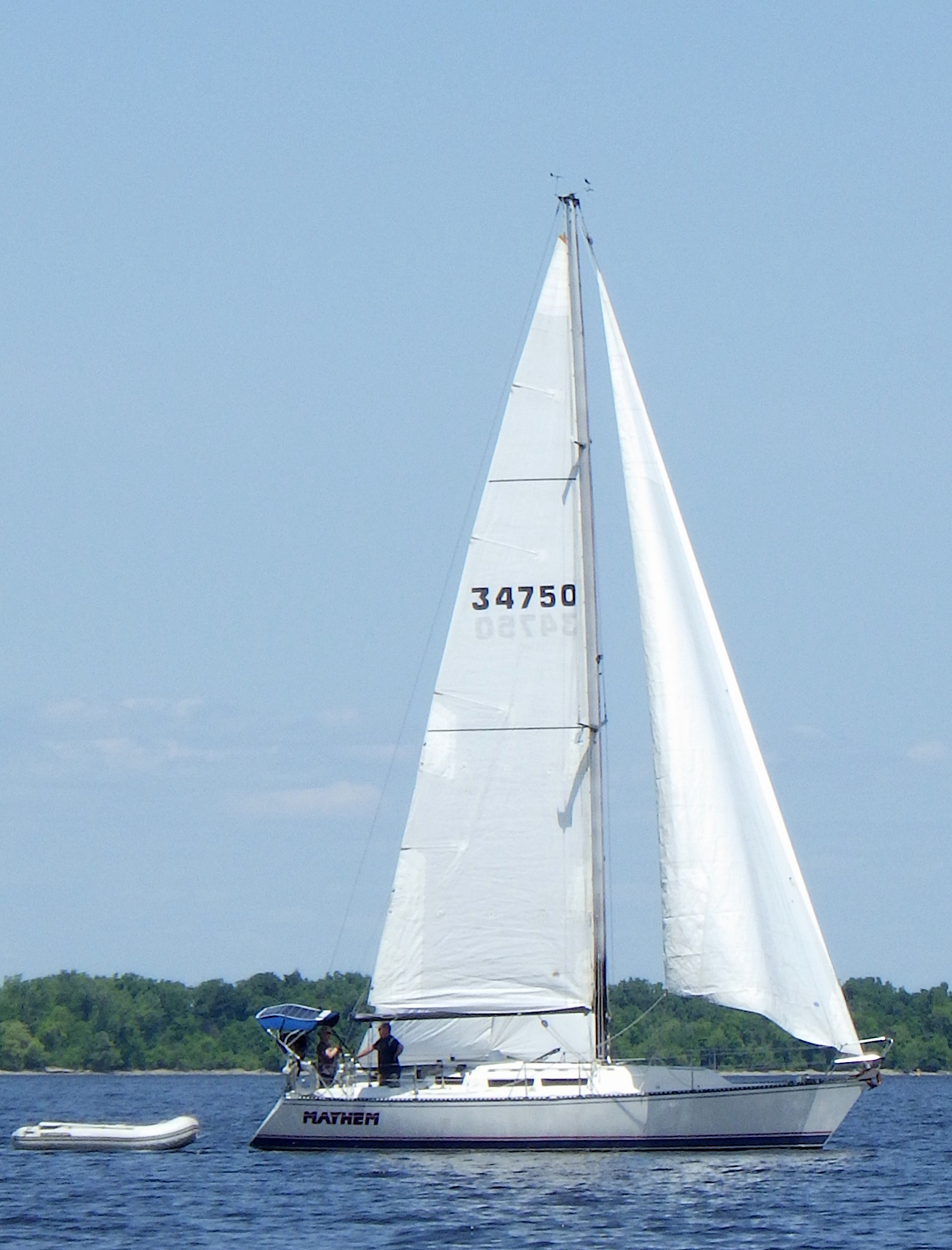

Development
- Designer: Steve Killing
- Location: Canada
- Year: 1984
- Builder: Goman Boat Limited Express Yachts
- Name: Express 35

Boat
- Displacement: 11,500 lb (5,216 kg)
- Draft: 6.50 ft (1.98 m)

Hull
- Type: Monohull
- Construction: Fiberglass
- LOA: 35.00 ft (10.67 m)
- LWL: 29.00 ft (8.84 m)
- Beam: 11.50 ft (3.51 m)
- Engine: Inboard motor

Hull appendages
- Keel: fin keel
- Ballast: 5,300 lb (2,404 kg)
- Rudder: internally-mounted spade-type rudder

Rig
- Rig type: Bermuda rig
- I foretriangle height: 49.00 ft (14.94 m)
- J foretriangle base: 14.80 ft (4.51 m)
- P mainsail luff: 43.50 ft (13.26 m)
- E mainsail foot: 13.50 ft (4.11 m)

Sails
- Sailplan: Masthead sloop
- Mainsail area: 293.63 sq ft (27.279 m^{2})
- Jib/genoa area: 362.60 sq ft (33.687 m^{2})
- Total sail area: 656.23 sq ft (60.966 m^{2})

The Express 35 is a recreational keelboat first built in 1984. It was built by Goman Boat Limited in Midland, Ontario Canada and later by Express Yachts in the same Midland Ontario facility, after the two companies merged. Goman Boat Limited was founded by two former C&C Yachts employees, Bill Goman and Steve Killing.

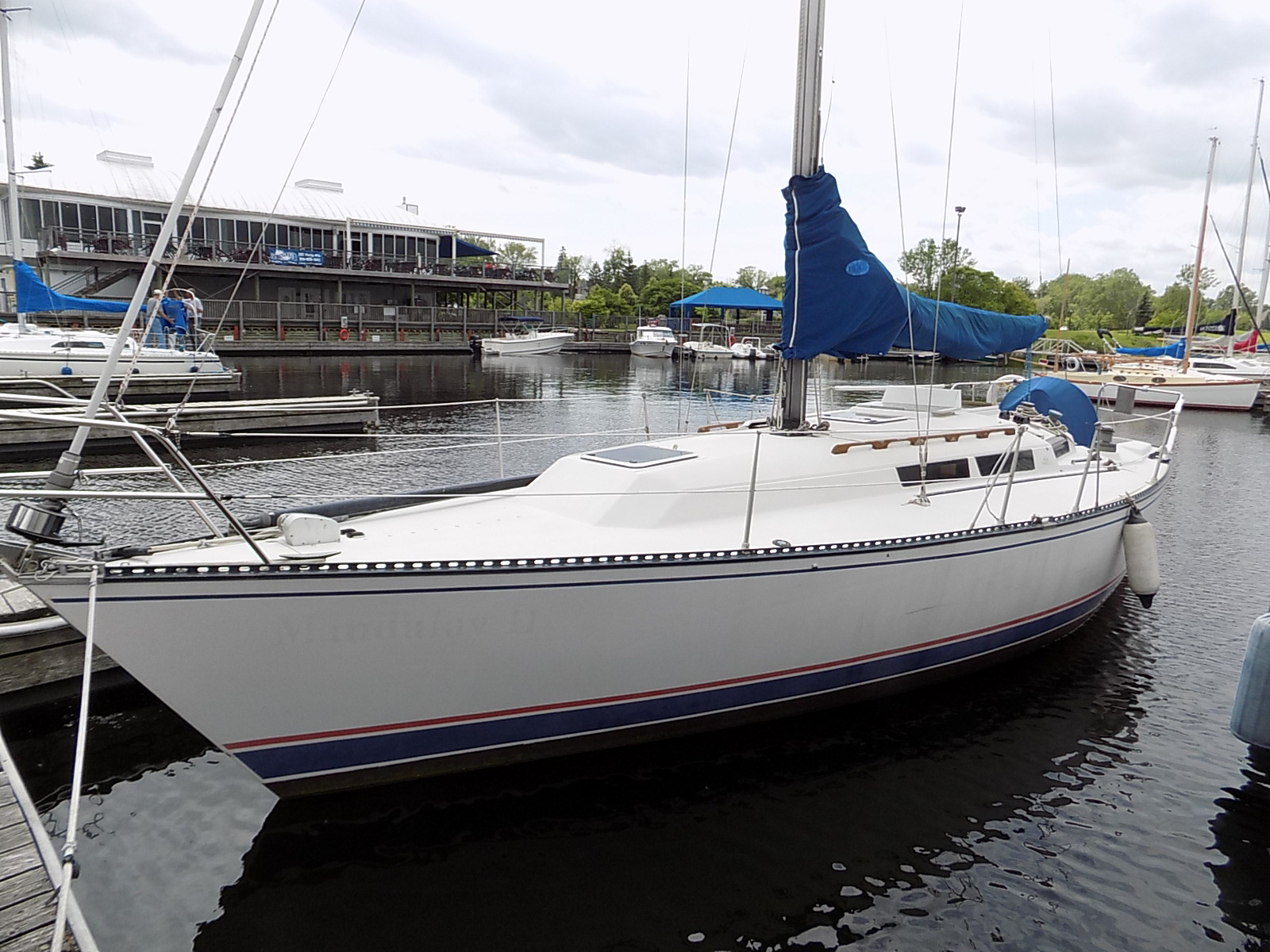
Express 35

It is built predominantly of fiberglass, with wood trim. It has a masthead sloop rig, a raked stem, a reverse transom, an internally-mounted spade-type rudder controlled by a wheel and a fixed fin keel. It displaces 11,500 lb (5,216 kg) and carries 5,300 lb (2,404 kg) of ballast.

The boat has a draft of 6.50 ft (1.98 m) with the standard keel and 5.40 ft (1.65 m) with the optional shoal draft keel. The boat is fitted with an inboard engine.

A tall mast version was also produced, with a mast about 1.8 ft (0.55 m) higher than standard.

The design has a hull speed of 7.22 kn (13.37 km/h).
