= James Frederick =

American sailor and sailing vlogger since 2015

- Occupations: Sailor; YouTuber

YouTube information
- Channel: Sailing Triteia
- Genres: Sailing; travel
- Subscribers: 161 thousand
- Views: 17.8 million
- Last updated: October 20, 2025

James Frederick is a solo sailor and sailing vlogger best known for sailing his 1965 Alberg 30 Triteia as part of his YouTube channel Sailing Triteia. Frederick was raised in New Mexico and dropped out of school at the age of 16. In August 2021 Frederick began his second attempt at sailing to Hawaii from California, during the voyage 1000 miles from Hawaii he lost his rudder and was forced to steer the rest of the way using a drogue. For this he was awarded the 2021 Qualifiers Mug from the Ocean Cruising Club. After spending the winter in Hawaii and repairing his rudder Frederick continued on towards French Polynesia.

== See also ==
- Sailing La Vagabonde – Australian sailing/cruising YouTube channel since 2014
- Sailing SV Delos – American sailing/travel/cruising YouTube channel
- Sam Holmes Sailing – Sailing travel vlog since 2006
- Wind Hippie Sailing – Sailing travel vlog since 2011
