= Sailing La Vagabonde =

Australian sailing/cruising YouTube channel since 2014

YouTube information
- Channel: Sailing La Vagabonde
- Years active: 2014–present
- Genres: Sailing; cruising
- Subscribers: 1.97 million
- Views: 466 million
- Last updated: 27 January 2026
- Website: sailing-lavagabonde.com

Sailing La Vagabonde is a YouTube channel run by Australian video bloggers Riley Whitelum and Elayna Carausu along with their children Lenny and Darwin. The channel documents the couple's life aboard their sailing tri-maran La Vagabonde. The channel has over 1.97 million subscribers and is the most popular sailing YouTube channel. In November 2019, they received significant media attention for sailing Greta Thunberg onboard La Vagabonde from Virginia to Lisbon for the 2019 United Nations Climate Change Conference in Madrid.

== History ==
The channel was founded in 2014 after Whitelum and Carausu met in Greece. The couple sustains their sailing by producing a weekly video blog on YouTube that is also funded by income from the crowdfunding web site Patreon. The series began aboard their Beneteau Cyclades sailboat. Following the success of their channel, they negotiated a discounted price with the company Outremer for the catamaran that they sailed from 2017 until 2022. Their next sailboat, a Rapido 60 trimaran, was launched on 2023. Between 2014 and 2022, the pair sailed over 160,000 kilometres (100,000 mi) combined, including four Atlantic Ocean crossings and one Pacific Ocean crossing. In March 2023, one of their videos received international media attention as it showed Whitelum fighting off a pack of monkeys that attacked him and his children on an island beach in Thailand.

== See also ==
- Sailing SV Delos – American sailing/travel/cruising YouTube channel
- Sailing Triteia – Sailing travel vlog since 2015
- Sam Holmes Sailing – Sailing travel vlog since 2006
- Wind Hippie Sailing – Sailing travel vlog since 2011
