= South Coast 25 =

1960s US recreational keelboat

Development
- Designer: Warren Metcalf
- Location: United States
- Year: 1969
- No. built: 100
- Builder: South Coast Seacraft
- Role: Cruiser
- Name: South Coast 25

Boat
- Displacement: 4,200 lb (1,905 kg)
- Draft: 3.50 ft (1.07 m)

Hull
- Type: monohull
- Construction: fiberglass
- LOA: 25.00 ft (7.62 m)
- LWL: 20.50 ft (6.25 m)
- Beam: 7.50 ft (2.29 m)
- Engine: outboard motor

Hull appendages
- Keel: fin keel
- Ballast: 1,800 lb (816 kg)
- Rudder: skeg-mounted/internally-mounted spade-type/transom-mounted rudder

Rig
- Rig type: Bermuda rig
- I foretriangle height: 30.50 ft (9.30 m)
- J foretriangle base: 9.00 ft (2.74 m)
- P mainsail luff: 27.00 ft (8.23 m)
- E mainsail foot: 12.00 ft (3.66 m)

Sails
- Sailplan: masthead sloop
- Mainsail area: 162.00 sq ft (15.050 m^{2})
- Jib/genoa area: 137.25 sq ft (12.751 m^{2})
- Total sail area: 299.25 sq ft (27.801 m^{2})

Racing
- PHRF: 231

The South Coast 25 is a recreational keelboat that was designed by Warren Metcalf and first built in 1969.

The boat was the first design effort by Metcalf, who was the son of the company owner, Hollis Metcalf. Warren Metcalf was killed in a diving accident just before completing the work on the design. His death was a factor in his father's sale of the company in 1975 and its subsequent closure in 1981.

== Production ==
The design was built by South Coast Seacraft in United States, from 1969 until 1973. A total of 100 boats were completed, but it is now out of production.

The boat was available complete and ready-to-sail or as a kit for amateur completion. The time to complete the kit was estimated at 50–60 hours.

== Design ==
The South Coast 25 is a recreational keelboat, built predominantly of fiberglass, with wooden trim. It has a masthead sloop rig, a self-bailing cockpit, a spooned raked stem, an angled transom, an internally mounted spade-type rudder controlled by a tiller and a fixed fin keel. It displaces 4,200 lb (1,905 kg) and carries 1,800 lb (816 kg) of ballast.

The boat has a draft of 3.50 ft (1.07 m) with the standard keel.

The boat is normally fitted with a small 6 to 10 hp (4 to 7 kW) outboard motor, mounted in a lazarette well, for docking and maneuvering.

The design has sleeping accommodation for five people, with a double "V"-berth in the bow cabin, a drop-down dinette table that forms a double berth on the port side of the main cabin and a quarter berth starboard aft. The galley is located on the starboard side just aft of the bow cabin. The galley is equipped with an icebox and a sink. There is also a small ice box in the lazarette's starboard side. The enclosed head is located just aft of the bow cabin on the port side. Cabin headroom is 66 in (168 cm) or 73 in (185 cm) with the cabin pop-top open. The fresh water tank has a capacity of 24 U.S. gallons (91 L; 20 imp gal).

The design has a PHRF racing average handicap of 231 and a hull speed of 6.1 kn (11.3 km/h).

== Operational history ==
The boat is supported by an active class club that organizes racing events, the South Coast Seacraft Owners' Association.

In a 2010 review Steve Henkel wrote, "best features: Headroom is an acceptable 5' 6", but with the poptop-type hatch in the elevated position, headroom increases to 6" 1", very good for a 25-footer. A supplemental ice chest in the stern quarter of the cockpit, presumably so the helmsperson doesn't have to bother the cook to pass up a cool beverage, is a clever touch. Worst features: The bridge deck appears to be shallow enough to permit water to pour down into the cabin if enough water from rain or waves sloshes into the cockpit."
