= Sailing SV Delos =

American sailing/travel/cruising YouTube channel

Sailing SV Delos Brian Trautman Karin Trautman
- Occupations: Sailor; sailing vlogger

YouTube information
- Channel: Sailing SV Delos
- Years active: 2009–present
- Genres: Sailing; travel; cruising
- Subscribers: 990 thousand
- Views: 283 million
- Last updated: 26 May 2026
- Website: svdelos.com

Sailing SV Delos is a YouTube channel that chronicles the travels and adventures of video bloggers aboard the sailing vessel Delos. The boat is owned by Brian Trautman, who sails with his wife Karin Syrén and their daughter Sierra. Trautman and Karin sailed Delos for many years with Trautman's brother Brady, along with an ever-changing crew, including Alex Blue. The team often invites new crew members aboard for their journeys who contribute to sailing, boat maintenance, and filming. The films include experiences and adventures, which include island exploration, hiking, underwater diving, partying, meeting local people, boat maintenance, and simple day-to-day living, boat repairs, emergency procedures in addition to their experience crossing oceans. Delos has made several ocean crossings, sometimes through heavy weather conditions such as severe lightning storms, and once tackling a 50-knot gale en route to Madagascar.

== Background ==
Trautman grew up in Flagstaff, Arizona, with a love of the outdoors and worked as a diesel mechanic during his high school years, later earning a degree in electrical engineering from the University of Washington. He worked at Microsoft before starting his own software company, but he soon grew tired of 60-hour workweeks. What inspired him to think about crossing oceans in a boat was reading the book Three Years in a 12-Foot Boat by Stephen G. Ladd. He spent several years researching and saving money and narrowed down his list of boats to a French-made Amel Super Maramu.

His first voyage began in 2009 in Seattle, Washington, in the United States. He sailed to Mexico where he was joined by his brother Brady, and the two of them along with Brian's then-partner sailed for New Zealand. There he met his future wife Karin Syrén, who began sailing with them. In their early days, they often had to work in local marinas to make money for boat repairs and fuel. In 2014, the crew re-thought their business model and learned how to support their income from YouTube with crowdfunding and Patreon campaigns.

== Channel ==
The Delos team has made more than 700 videos on its YouTube channel. The channel saw rapid growth over the years from 90,000 subscribers in December 2016 to 906,000 (as of February 2025). On Instagram, it had over 170,000 followers as of August 2020. It received 1.8 million views per month in December 2019. A 2019 report in Yachting World magazine suggested that the crew made $14,000 for each video from paying donors and produced about four videos each month.

== Boats ==
Delos is a 53-foot long Amel Super Maramu, built in La Rochelle, France, purchased by Trautman in 2008. It sleeps six people comfortably. From 2008 to 2021, Trautman and crew sailed Delos more than 70,000 miles. As a former electrical engineer, Trautman used his knowledge to make various improvements to the boat — installing lithium-iron-phosphate batteries with a battery management system to power the electronics on the vessel, including an induction cooktop. The crew has taken numerous steps to make Delos environmentally friendly.

Delos 2.0 is currently being built by Stradbroke Yachts with the assistance of Brian and Karin at Redland City Marina in Thornlands QLD 4164, just outside of Brisbane, Australia. Delos 2.0 is a customized 16m (52'-6") welded aluminum sailing catamaran designed by naval architect David De Villiers of New Zealand. Brian and his family moved to Australia to help build Delos 2.0. Brian has learned to weld aluminum, and he works alongside the Stradbroke crew daily to build their future home. Delos 2.0 is built like an aluminum aircraft fuselage, the structure is made up of frames, longitudinal stringers, and hull plates. Delos 2.0 has a diesel/electric hybrid drive for motoring in and out of port and when winds are too light for sailing. Delos 2.0 is a variant of the De Villiers Model 525 which is unique with an inside weather-proof helm. A door beside the helm goes forward to the outside cockpit where all the lines and winches reside for the sails. The model 525 has a beam of 7.70m (25'-3"), giving a length/ beam ratio of 2.08, 2.1 is considered by many experts to be the perfect L/B ratio for stability and comfort when sailing. Delos 2.0 has been strengthened for exploring anywhere on the globe, 6mm hull plates were used which is a 20% increase over the standard. The skegs are extra thick and protect the propellers and rudders from damage. The catamaran has rugged mini keels vs daggerboard which along with the heavy skegs make beaching the boat possible without damage. Delos 2.0 weighs in at 17,640kg (38,890 lbs) full displacement load. The catamaran has water catchment on the roof of the saloon and will have a large solar array for battery charging. One of the customizations on Delos 2.0 is the rearward extension of the saloon roof over their outdoor barbeque/kitchen/diving space which will add significant area for water catchment and solar panels. Their build journey can be followed on their YouTube channel ‘Sailing SV Delos’.

== Philanthropy ==
The crew engaged in numerous philanthropic endeavors, such as contributing to restoration efforts on the island of Dominica, which was ravaged by Hurricane Maria in 2017. In 2019, they donated US$50,000 to various charities, such as the Surfrider Foundation, which seeks to protect the world's oceans.

== See also ==
- Sailing La Vagabonde – Australian sailing/cruising YouTube channel since 2014
- Sailing Triteia – Sailing travel vlog since 2015
- Sam Holmes Sailing – Sailing travel vlog since 2006
- Wind Hippie Sailing – Sailing travel vlog since 2011
