= Alberg 29 =

Sailboat class

- Alberg 29 motoring

Development
- Designer: Carl Alberg
- Location: Canada
- Year: 1976
- No. built: 80
- Builder: Nye Yachts

Boat
- Displacement: 9,000 lb (4,082 kg)
- Draft: 4.50 ft (1.37 m)

Hull
- Type: Monohull
- Construction: Fibreglass
- LOA: 29.25 ft (8.92 m)
- LWL: 22.25 ft (6.78 m)
- Beam: 9.17 ft (2.80 m)
- Engine: Yanmar 15 hp (11 kW) diesel engine

Hull appendages
- Keel: long keel
- Ballast: 4,000 lb (1,814 kg) of lead
- Rudder: keel-mounted rudder

Rig
- Rig type: Bermuda rig
- I foretriangle height: 37.00 ft (11.28 m)
- J foretriangle base: 12.00 ft (3.66 m)
- P mainsail luff: 32.00 ft (9.75 m)
- E mainsail foot: 12.16 ft (3.71 m)

Sails
- Sailplan: Masthead sloop
- Mainsail area: 194.56 sq ft (18.075 m^{2})
- Jib/genoa area: 222.00 sq ft (20.624 m^{2})
- Total sail area: 416.56 sq ft (38.700 m^{2})

Rating
- PHRF: 222

The Alberg 29 is a full keel masthead sloop. She displaces 9,000 lb (4,082 kg) with 4,000 lb (1,814 kg) of lead ballast. Eighty were built by Nye Yachts in Ontario, Canada from 1976 to 1985.

== Design ==
A refinement of the Alberg 30, the racer-cruiser was commissioned by Nye Yachts and designed by Carl Alberg.

The hull has a spooned raked stem, a raised transom, a keel-mounted rudder controlled by a wheel and a fixed l cutaway forward.

The fuel tank holds 12 U.S. gallons (45 L; 10.0 imp gal). The fresh water tank has a capacity of 30 U.S. gallons (110 L; 25 imp gal).

The galley is to starboard at the bottom of the companionway steps and includes a stainless steel sink and a two-burner propane stove.

The enclosed head is to port aft of the "V"-berth, with the sink on the starboard side. A shower was a factory option.

Additional sleeping space is in the cabin, by the dinette settee, which has a fixed table and a single berth to starboard. The trim is teak, with the cabin sole teak and holly. The design has 74 in (188 cm) of headroom below decks.

Ventilation is provided by a plexiglass forward hatch and six opening ports, while a further four ports are fixed.

The boat has genoa and jib tracks and four cockpit winches, plus bronze cleats and blocks. There is an anchor locker in the bow.

In a review Michael McGoldrick wrote, "In many ways, the Alberg 29 is the refinement and culmination of the concept behind the original Alberg 30. It has a slightly more modern look about it. Like the older Alberg 30, this boat has a full keel and places a high priority on seaworthiness. The cleats, portholes, and other equipment are robust and indicate that the Alberg 29 was designed for bluewater cruising. Despite its full keel design, owners report that when the wind picks up, the Alberg 29 can point quite high and has a good turn of speed."

In a review Richard Sherwood wrote, "While the Alberg 29 has a full keel, it is not long. The bow and counter combine to give a short, 22-foot 3-inch waterline. The bow is fine, the keel cut away. Bilges are firm, and the wide beam gives stability. Like other full-keel boats, she tracks well. The rig is high aspect and there is a large foretriangle for windward performance."

== See also ==
- List of sailing boat types
