= Sea Sprite Sailing Yachts =

Series of sail boats

Sea Sprite sailing yachts is a family of US built sailing vessels. The series includes the following yachts, a 23', 28', 30', and a 34'. They were all simply designated Sea Sprites. The twin sails in a following seas emblem is well known in the yachting world.

Sea Sprites are being sailed throughout the world, with the largest concentration in New England waters. Narragansett Bay and Buzzards Bay are prime waters for these classic yachts.

The Sea Sprite 23, designed by famous naval architect Carl Alberg was first produced in 1958. The Sea Sprite 27, 30 and 34 were designed by Alfred E. (Bill) Luders Jr. The series share their full keel, sea friendly design.

Robert Gainer single-handedly sailed a Sea Sprite 23 from Rhode Island to England. This is detailed in the book by John Koster: Presumed Lost: The Saga of Robert Gainer.

The C. E. Ryder Company of Bristol, Rhode Island, United States produced the last hull in 1986. There were over 800 built during the run of the series.
