= South Coast 23 =

1960s US recreational keelboat

Development
- Designer: Carl Alberg
- Location: United States
- Year: 1965
- No. built: 250
- Builder: South Coast Seacraft
- Role: Day sailer-cruiser
- Name: South Coast 23

Boat
- Displacement: 3,750 lb (1,701 kg)
- Draft: 2.83 ft (0.86 m)

Hull
- Type: monohull
- Construction: fiberglass
- LOA: 23.00 ft (7.01 m)
- LWL: 17.50 ft (5.33 m)
- Beam: 7.25 ft (2.21 m)
- Engine: outboard motor

Hull appendages
- Keel: long keel
- Ballast: 1,475 lb (669 kg)
- Rudder: keel-mounted rudder

Rig
- Rig type: Bermuda rig
- I foretriangle height: 27.50 ft (8.38 m)
- J foretriangle base: 8.75 ft (2.67 m)
- P mainsail luff: 24.00 ft (7.32 m)
- E mainsail foot: 10.50 ft (3.20 m)

Sails
- Sailplan: masthead sloop
- Mainsail area: 126.00 sq ft (11.706 m^{2})
- Jib/genoa area: 120.31 sq ft (11.177 m^{2})
- Total sail area: 246.31 sq ft (22.883 m^{2})

Racing
- PHRF: 270

The South Coast 23 is a recreational keelboat designed by Carl Alberg and first built in 1965.

== Production ==
The design was built by South Coast Seacraft in the United States, starting in 1965. A total of 250 were completed, but it is now out of production.

While many boats were delivered complete and ready-to-sail, South Coast Seacraft also supplied some boats as kits for amateur completion.

The South Coast 23 design was developed into the Kittiwake 23 in 1966 by the Kenner Boat Company, by taking one extra hull and using it to build a new mold, slightly lengthening it and changing the cabin top shape. Kenner was the contractor to South Coast that built the early South Coast 23 hulls and the Kittiwake 23 was developed when South Coast moved hull production away from Kenner.

== Design ==
The South Coast 23 is a recreational keelboat, built predominantly of fiberglass, with wooden trim. It has a masthead sloop rig; a spooned, raked stem; a raised counter, angled transom with a lazarette; a keel-mounted rudder controlled by a tiller and a fixed long keel. It displaces 3,750 lb (1,701 kg) and carries 1,475 lb (669 kg) of ballast.

The boat has a draft of 2.83 ft (0.86 m) with the standard keel.

The boat is normally fitted with a small 3 to 6 hp (2 to 4 kW) well-mounted outboard motor for docking and maneuvering.

The design was available as a two-berth daysailer/overnighter model with a shorter cabin or as a four-berth cruiser. The latter model has sleeping accommodation for four people, with a double "V"-berth in the bow cabin and two straight settee berths in the main cabin. The galley is located on both sides just aft of the bow cabin. The galley is equipped with a sink and an icebox. The head is located in the bow cabin, under the "V"-berth. The fresh water tank has a capacity of 16 U.S. gallons (61 L; 13 imp gal) and the cabin headroom is 53 in (135 cm).

The design has a PHRF racing average handicap of 270 and a hull speed of 5.6 kn (10.4 km/h).

== Operational history ==
The boat is supported by an active class club that organizes racing events, the South Coast Seacraft Owners' Association.

In a 2010 review Steve Henkel, who completed and sailed a kit South Coast 23 with his wife, wrote, "best features: Carl Alberg did a good job designing a graceful-looking hull with springy sheer and relatively low freeboard. A cockpit-mounted outboard motor well and a lazarette to store the motor when not in use were also good ideas. A 6 hp outboard with a high-thrust prop is all the power she needed, even in heavy air. Worst features: The boat's biggest fault is probably the shallow (2' 10") draft, which isn't quite enough to make the boat as close winded as she otherwise could be. We like to claim that's why we never won a race with her."
