= Eclipse 6.7 =

Sailboat class

Development
- Designer: Carl Alberg
- Location: United States
- Year: 1978
- Builder: South Coast Seacraft
- Role: Cruiser
- Name: Eclipse 6.7

Boat
- Displacement: 1,800 lb (816 kg)
- Draft: 4.83 ft (1.47 m)

Hull
- Type: monohull
- Construction: fiberglass
- LOA: 22.00 ft (6.71 m)
- LWL: 17.00 ft (5.18 m)
- Beam: 7.08 ft (2.16 m)
- Engine: outboard motor

Hull appendages
- Keel: lifting keel
- Ballast: 500 lb (227 kg)
- Rudder: transom-mounted rudder

Rig
- Rig type: Bermuda rig

Sails
- Sailplan: masthead sloop
- Total sail area: 209.00 sq ft (19.417 m^{2})

The Eclipse 6.7, also called the Northbridge Eclipse, is an American trailerable sailboat that was designed by Carl Alberg as a cruiser and first built in 1978.

The design is a development of the South Coast 22, which was in turn based upon Alberg's South Coast 21 design. The Eclipse differs from the South Coast 22 by moving the mast 2 ft (0.61 m) forward, plus changes to the coach house roof, cockpit and the interior.

== Production ==
The design was built by South Coast Seacraft in United States, starting in 1978, but it is now out of production.

== Design ==
The Eclipse 6.7 is a recreational keelboat, built predominantly of fiberglass, with wood trim. It has a masthead sloop rig, a spooned raked stem, an angled transom, a transom-hung rudder controlled by a tiller and a swing keel. It displaces 1,800 lb (816 kg) and carries 500 lb (227 kg) of ballast.

The boat has a draft of 4.83 ft (1.47 m) with the keel extended and 0.83 ft (0.25 m) with it retracted, allowing operation in shallow water, beaching or ground transportation on a trailer. The boat is normally fitted with a small outboard motor for docking and maneuvering.

The design has a hull speed of 5.52 kn (10.22 km/h).

== Operational history ==
The boat is supported by an active class club that organizes racing events, the South Coast Seacraft Owners' Association.

== See also ==
- List of sailing boat types
