= Herreshoff Rozinante =

Sailboat class

Development
- Designer: L. Francis Herreshoff
- Location: United States
- Year: 1952
- Builders: South Coast Seacraft; Kenner Boat Company; Artisan Boatworks
- Role: Day sailer-cruiser
- Name: Herreshoff Rozinante

Boat
- Displacement: 6,550 lb (2,971 kg)
- Draft: 3.75 ft (1.14 m)

Hull
- Type: monohull
- Construction: fiberglass
- LOA: 28.00 ft (8.53 m)
- LWL: 24.00 ft (7.32 m)
- Beam: 6.33 ft (1.93 m)

Hull appendages
- Keel: long keel
- Ballast: 3,360 lb (1,524 kg)
- Rudder: keel-mounted rudder

Rig
- Rig type: Bermuda rig
- I foretriangle height: 24.00 ft (7.32 m)
- J foretriangle base: 8.00 ft (2.44 m)
- P mainsail luff: 27.80 ft (8.47 m)
- E mainsail foot: 12.50 ft (3.81 m)

Sails
- Sailplan: fractional rigged ketch
- Mainsail area: 173.75 sq ft (16.142 m^{2})
- Jib/genoa area: 96.00 sq ft (8.919 m^{2})
- Total sail area: 269.75 sq ft (25.061 m^{2})

The Herreshoff Rozinante is an American full-keel, double-ended sailboat that was designed by L. Francis Herreshoff as a daysailer and cruiser and first built in 1952.

== Production ==
Plans for the design were first published in The Rudder magazine.

In the past the design was built by South Coast Seacraft and Kenner Boat Company in United States. Today it is available as a custom-built boat from Artisan Boatworks.

== Design ==
The Herreshoff Rozinante is a recreational keelboat, with early boats built from wood, while later boats are built predominantly of fiberglass, with wooden trim. The hull is a double-ended canoe design. It has a fractional ketch rig, a spooned raked stem, an angled transom, a keel-mounted rudder controlled by a tiller and a fixed long keel. It displaces 6,550 lb (2,971 kg) and carries 3,360 lb (1,524 kg) of ballast.

The boat has a draft of 3.75 ft (1.14 m) with the standard keel.

When not sailed, the boat is normally propelled by oars, but may also be fitted with a small outboard motor for docking and maneuvering.

The design has sleeping accommodation for two people.

== Operational history ==
The boat was at one time supported by a class club, the Herreshoff Rozinante Association, but the club seem to no longer be in business.

In his 2012 book, In the South - Tales of Sail and Yearning, Geoff Heriot wrote of the boat, "the teenager immediately recognised and responded to the concept of simplicity in design, design for purpose and the elegance of what might result. Once attuned, Atkins found through reading that he quickly discovered L. Francis Herreshoff. 'Somewhere out of everything came Rozinante (Herreshoff's 28-foot canoe-yawl) and the concept that you could have something so perfect,' he said. Rozinante was another Herreshoff design to be named after a character in the Cervantes novel Don Quixote. But, for those of a maritime inclination, her fame and her curvaceous lines outstripped any identity from literature. Rozinante was the name of Don Quixote's horse and, according to the rambling narrative of Herreshoff’s book, The Compleat Cruiser: 'She was a long, thin animal but every time the Don mounted her he had remarkable adventures.' So too did the supposed skipper of Herreshoff's lean sailing 'canoe', even though the designer said, like Don Quixote, 'seven-eighths' of the adventure might take place in the mind."

== See also ==
- List of sailing boat types
