= Cape Dory 22 =

Sailboat class

Development
- Designer: Carl Alberg
- Location: United States
- Year: 1981
- No. built: 176
- Builder: Cape Dory Yachts
- Name: Cape Dory 22

Boat
- Displacement: 3,200 lb (1,451 kg)
- Draft: 3.00 ft (0.91 m)

Hull
- Type: Monohull
- Construction: Fiberglass
- LOA: 22.33 ft (6.81 m)
- LWL: 16.25 ft (4.95 m)
- Beam: 7.33 ft (2.23 m)
- Engine: Yanmar 7.5 hp (6 kW) diesel engine or Outboard motor

Hull appendages
- Keel: long keel
- Ballast: 1,400 lb (635 kg)
- Rudder: keel-mounted rudder

Rig
- Rig type: Bermuda rig
- I foretriangle height: 28.00 ft (8.53 m)
- J foretriangle base: 9.00 ft (2.74 m)
- P mainsail luff: 24.00 ft (7.32 m)
- E mainsail foot: 9.50 ft (2.90 m)

Sails
- Sailplan: Masthead sloop
- Mainsail area: 114.00 sq ft (10.591 m^{2})
- Jib/genoa area: 126.00 sq ft (11.706 m^{2})
- Total sail area: 240.00 sq ft (22.297 m^{2})

Racing
- PHRF: 273 (average)

The Cape Dory 22 is an American sailboat that was designed by Carl Alberg as a cruiser and first built in 1981.

The design was developed into the Typhoon Senior in 1984, using the same hull molds.

== Production ==
The design was built by Cape Dory Yachts in the United States. A total of 176 examples were completed during its production from 1981 to 1985.

== Design ==
The Cape Dory 22 is a recreational keelboat, built predominantly of fiberglass, with wood trim. The deck is balsa-cored. It has a masthead sloop rig, a raked stem, a raised transom, a keel-mounted rudder controlled by a tiller and a fixed long keel. It displaces 3,200 lb (1,451 kg) and carries 1,400 lb (635 kg) of ballast.

The boat has a draft of 3.00 ft (0.91 m) with the standard keel fitted.

The boat is normally fitted with a small outboard motor for docking and maneuvering, but a special "D" model was produced with an inboard Japanese Yanmar diesel engine of 7.5 hp (6 kW), located under the companionway ladder. The fuel tank holds 13 U.S. gallons (49 L; 11 imp gal).

The design has accommodation for four people, with a forward "V"-berth in the bow, with a privacy curtain. The galley consists of a sink and ice chest on the port side of the cabin and a two-burner alcohol-fired stove on the starboard side. The head is a portable marine toilet that can be located under the forward berth. Ventilation is provided by an opening hatch forward and four bronze portlights.

The boat's cabin sole is teak and holly, while the remaining wood is teak.

The design has a PHRF racing average handicap of 273 with a high of 252 and low of 282. It has a hull speed of 5.4 kn (10.00 km/h).

== Operational history ==
The boat is supported by an active class club that organizes racing events, the Cape Dory Sailboat Owners Association.

== See also ==
- List of sailing boat types
