= Alberg 22 =

Sailboat class

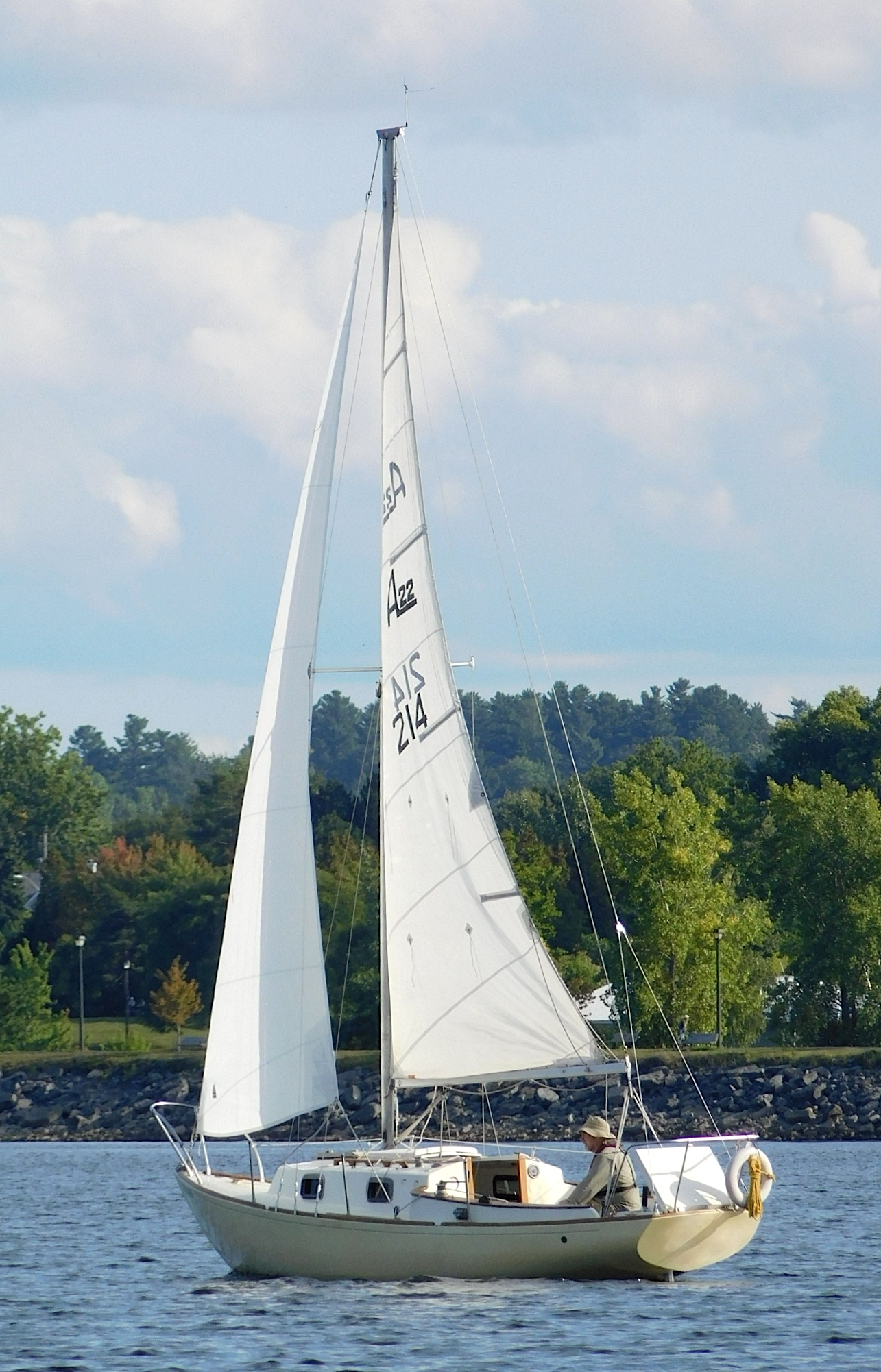

Development
- Designer: Carl Alberg
- Location: Canada
- Year: 1970
- No. built: 180
- Builder: Nye Yachts
- Name: Alberg 22

Boat
- Displacement: 3,200 lb (1,451 kg)
- Draft: 3.08 ft (0.94 m)

Hull
- Type: Monohull
- Construction: Fiberglass
- LOA: 22.00 ft (6.71 m)
- LWL: 16.00 ft (4.88 m)
- Beam: 7.00 ft (2.13 m)
- Engine: Outboard motor

Hull appendages
- Keel: long keel
- Ballast: 1,540 lb (699 kg)
- Rudder: keel-mounted rudder

Rig
- Rig type: Bermuda rig
- I foretriangle height: 27.75 ft (8.46 m)
- J foretriangle base: 8.75 ft (2.67 m)
- P mainsail luff: 24.00 ft (7.32 m)
- E mainsail foot: 9.50 ft (2.90 m)

Sails
- Sailplan: Masthead sloop
- Mainsail area: 114.00 sq ft (10.591 m^{2})
- Jib/genoa area: 121.41 sq ft (11.279 m^{2})
- Total sail area: 235.41 sq ft (21.870 m^{2})

Racing
- PHRF: 282 (average)

The Alberg 22 is a recreational keelboat designed by Swedish-American naval architect Carl Alberg and first built in 1970.

== Production ==
The design was built by Nye Yachts in Belleville, Ontario, later located in Bloomfield, Ontario, Canada. A total of 180 boats were produced.

== Design ==
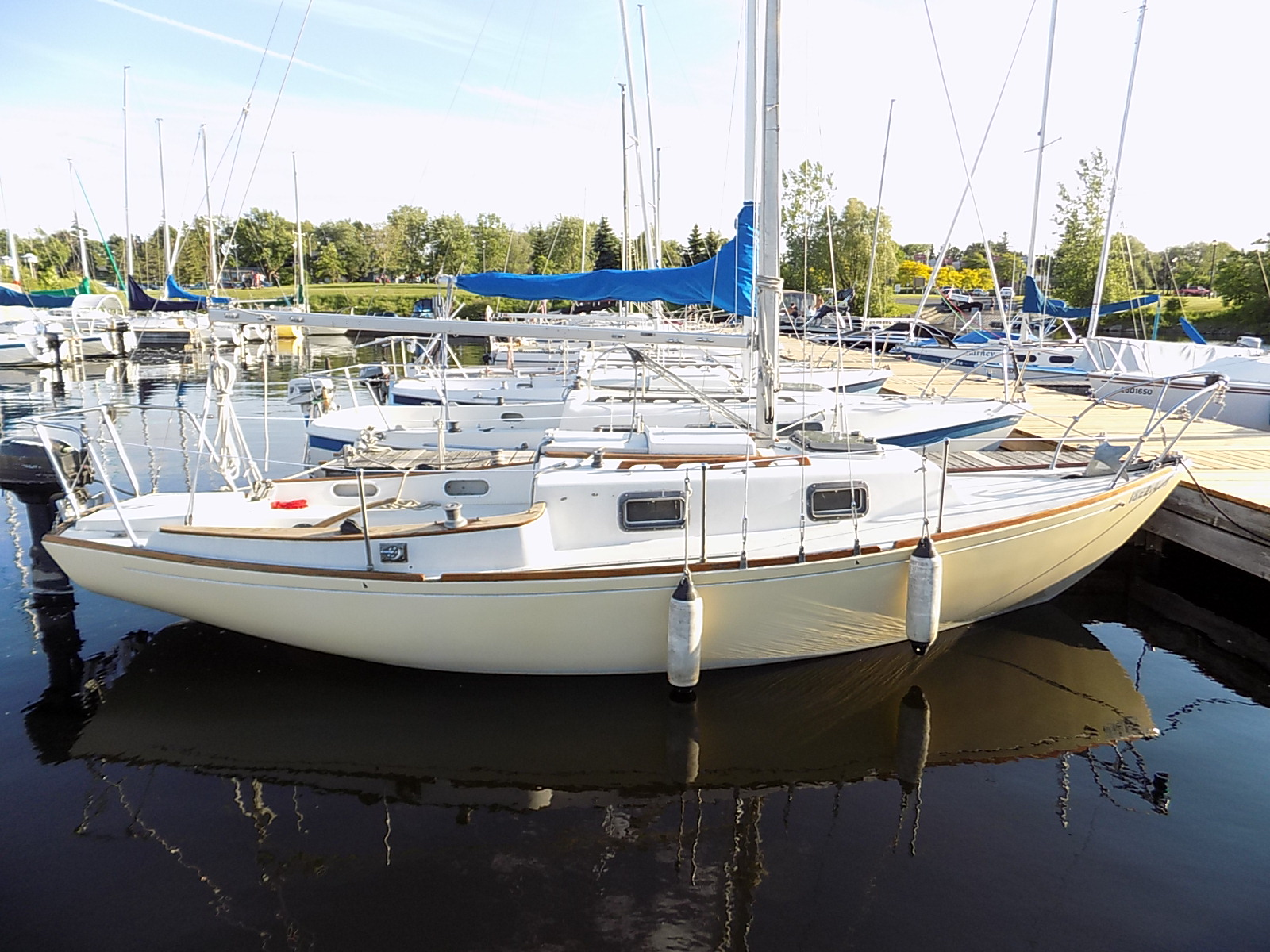
Alberg 22

The Alberg 22 is built predominantly of fiberglass, with teak wooden handrails and toe rails, plus other trim. It has a masthead sloop rig, a raked stem, a raised transom, a keel-mounted rudder controlled by a tiller and a fixed long keel. It displaces 3,200 lb (1,451 kg) and carries 1,540 lb (699 kg) of ballast. Due to its weight and full keel it has been noted as handling like a larger boat.

The boat is normally fitted with a small outboard motor of up to 6 hp (4 kW) for docking and maneuvering. The outboard motor is fitted to a transom well and the lazarette has space for the fuel tank.

Accommodations are provided for four people in a forward "V"-berth and two quarter berths. The galley is equipped with a sink with a water pump and a removable icebox.

Fitted equipment includes genoa tracks and winches, as well as a halyard winch.

The design has a PHRF racing average handicap of 282 with a high of 276 and low of 288. It has a hull speed of 5.36 kn (9.93 km/h).

== Operational history ==
In a review Michael McGoldrick wrote, "this full keel boat has the proportions of a classic sailboat. It was designed by Carl Alberg, who earned a reputation for drawing extremely seaworthy sailboats. In fact, some people who are now sailing Alberg 30s and 37s got their start with the Alberg 22. The Alberg 22 heels over fairly easily at first, but it reaches a point where it locks in and goes. The full keel and high ballast displacement ratio (almost 50%) suggests that this boat should be able to handle some rough conditions."

In a 2010 review Steve Henkel wrote, "This shippy little craft is almost indistinguishable from a number of similar Alberg designs ... The boat is very good for weekend cruising, though you may find she will get a bit crowded if you bring the kids along ... Best features: The high B/D ratio and long keel provide easy steering and relatively good comfort in cruising mode. The outboard well in the lazarette makes engine access easier and avoids prop cavitation in all but the choppiest seas. Worst features: Unless you are planning to challenge other Albergs of similar size, forget racing. The keel isn't deep enough to take a big enough bite for good close-hauled performance."

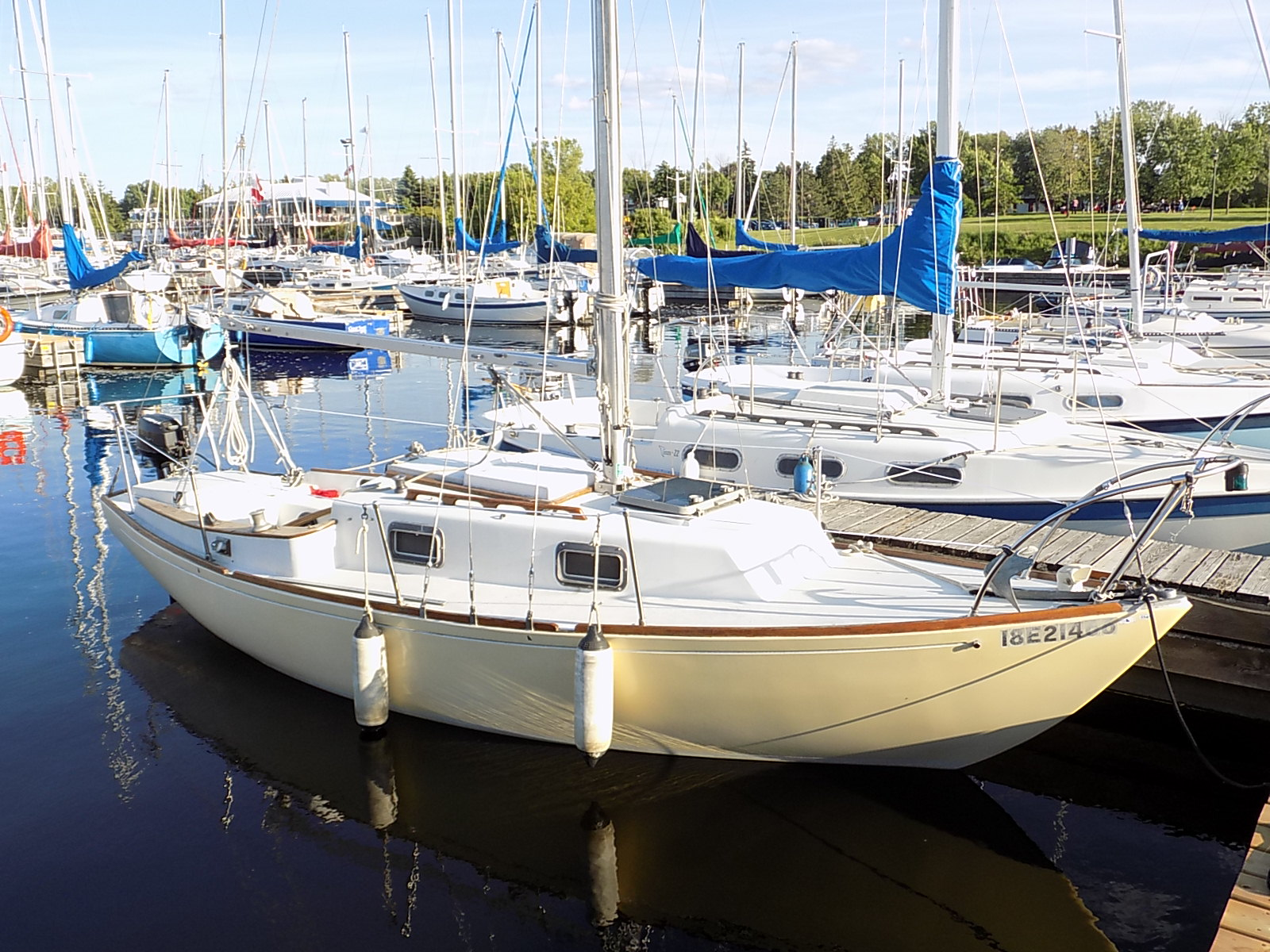
Alberg 22

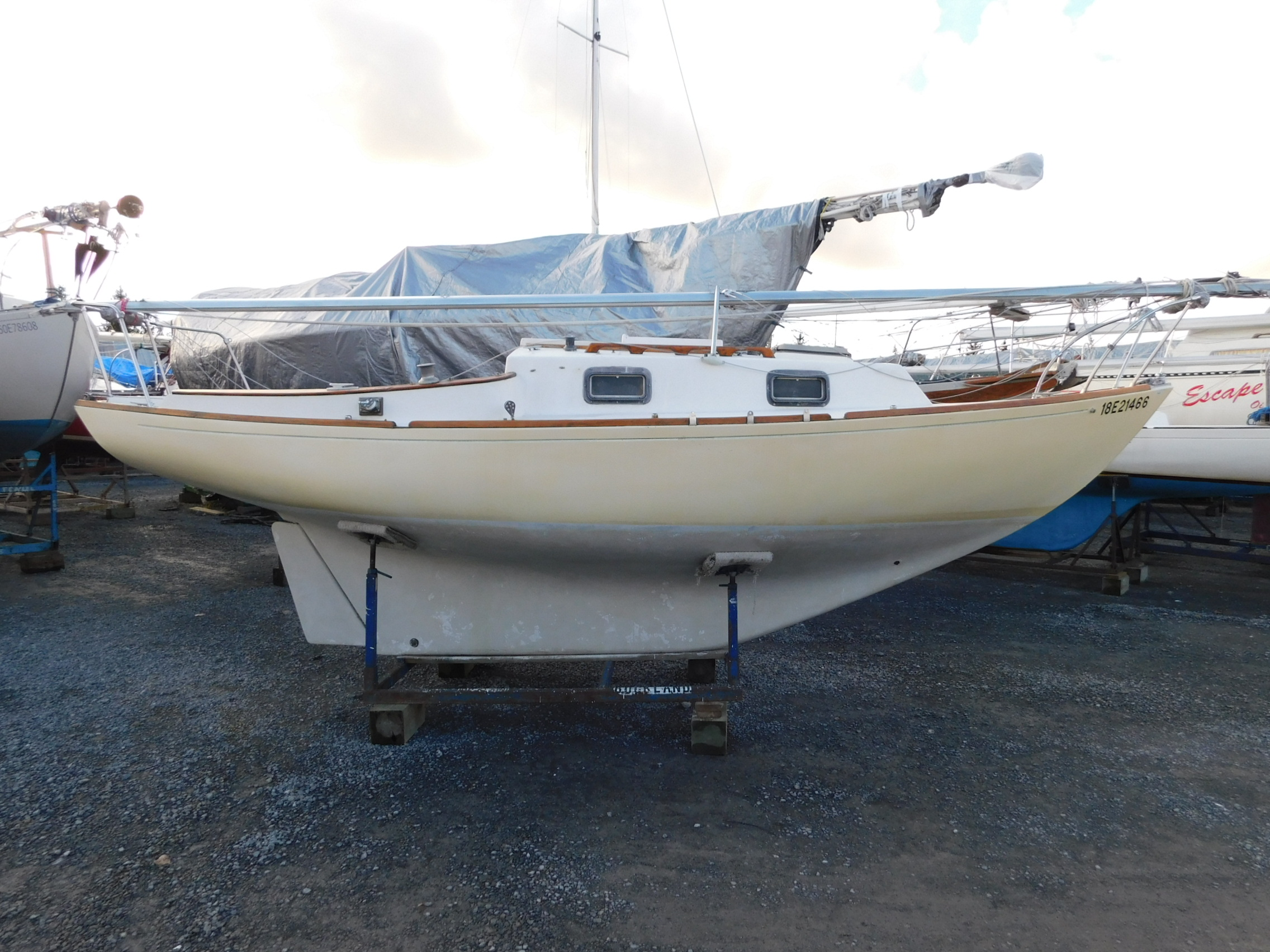
Alberg 22 on its cradle, showing the keel and rudder configuration
