= Kittiwake 23 =

Sailboat class

Development
- Designer: Carl Alberg
- Location: United States
- Year: 1966
- Builders: Kenner Boat Company; Ray Greene & Company; River City Sailcraft
- Role: Cruiser

Boat
- Displacement: 3,700 lb (1,678 kg)
- Draft: 2.83 ft (0.86 m)

Hull
- Type: monohull
- Construction: fiberglass
- LOA: 23.58 ft (7.19 m)
- LWL: 17.75 ft (5.41 m)
- Beam: 7.42 ft (2.26 m)
- Engine: outboard motor

Hull appendages
- Keel: long keel
- Ballast: 1,500 lb (680 kg)
- Rudder: keel-mounted rudder

Rig
- Rig type: Bermuda rig
- I foretriangle height: 27.50 ft (8.38 m)
- J foretriangle base: 8.80 ft (2.68 m)
- P mainsail luff: 24.00 ft (7.32 m)
- E mainsail foot: 10.50 ft (3.20 m)

Sails
- Sailplan: masthead sloop
- Mainsail area: 126.00 sq ft (11.706 m^{2})
- Jib/genoa area: 121.00 sq ft (11.241 m^{2})
- Total sail area: 247.00 sq ft (22.947 m^{2})

Racing
- PHRF: 270

The Kittiwake 23, also called the Kittiwake 24 and the Kenner Kittiwake, is an American trailerable sailboat that was designed by Carl Alberg as a cruiser and first built in 1966. It is named for the species of gull.

The boat is a development of the Alberg-designed South Coast 23, with a modified, stepped cabin top shape.

== Production ==
The design was built by the Kenner Boat Company, Ray Greene & Company and River City Sailcraft in the United States, but it is now out of production.

The Alberg-designed South Coast 23 hulls were originally built by Kenner under contract to South Coast Sea Craft. South Coast Sea Craft took the molds and moved them to a new facility in about 1965. Kenner used one remaining hull to build a new mold, with a slightly lengthened stern and a new cabin top design, creating the Kittiwake, which was put into production, without crediting Alberg as the designer. The Kenner Boat Company was sold to AJ Industries in about 1969 and continued as an AJ division, Kenner Sailing Yachts, with the Kittiwake remaining in production. In 1973 Ray Greene & Company purchased the molds and continued production until it went out of business in 1975. The molds were acquired by River City Sailcraft who continued production from 1976 until 1978 when a factory fire destroyed the molds, ending production of the design.

The boat was also sold by Kenner as a kit for amateur completion.

== Design ==
The Kittiwake 23 is a recreational keelboat, built predominantly of hand-laid fiberglass, with marine mahogany bulkheads and teak trim. It has a masthead sloop rig; a spooned, raked stem; a raised counter, angled transom, a keel-mounted rudder controlled by a tiller and a fixed long keel. It displaces 3,700 lb (1,678 kg) and carries 1,500 lb (680 kg) of lead ballast.

The boat has a draft of 2.83 ft (0.86 m) with the standard keel.

The boat is normally fitted with a small 3 to 6 hp (2 to 4 kW) well-mounted outboard motor for docking and maneuvering.

The design has sleeping accommodation for four people, with a double "V"-berth in the bow cabin and two straight settee berths in the main cabin. The galley is located just aft of the forward cabin. The head is located in the bow cabin, under the "V"-berth. Cabin headroom is 54 in (137 cm).

The design has a PHRF racing average handicap of 270 and a hull speed of 5.6 kn (10.4 km/h).

== Operational history ==
The boat was at one time supported by a class club, the Kittiwake 23 Sailboat Registry, but it seems to no longer exist.

== See also ==
- List of sailing boat types

Related development

- South Coast 23
