= Sea Sprite 23 =

1950s US recreational keelboat

Sea Sprite 23 Daysailor
Development
- Designer: Carl Alberg
- Location: United States
- Year: 1958
- No. built: 780
- Builders: American Boatbuilding; Wickford Shipyard; C. E. Ryder; Sailstar Boat Company; Beetle Boat Company
- Role: Day sailer-cruiser

Boat
- Displacement: 3,350 lb (1,520 kg)
- Draft: 3.10 ft (0.94 m)

Hull
- Type: monohull
- Construction: fiberglass
- LOA: 22.50 ft (6.86 m)
- LWL: 16.25 ft (4.95 m)
- Beam: 7.00 ft (2.13 m)
- Engine: diesel engine/outboard motor

Hull appendages
- Keel: long keel
- Ballast: 1,400 lb (635 kg)
- Rudder: keel-mounted rudder

Rig
- Rig type: Bermuda rig
- I foretriangle height: 25.00 ft (7.62 m)
- J foretriangle base: 7.25 ft (2.21 m)
- P mainsail luff: 27.00 ft (8.23 m)
- E mainsail foot: 11.42 ft (3.48 m)

Sails
- Sailplan: fractional rigged sloop
- Mainsail area: 154.17 sq ft (14.323 m^{2})
- Jib/genoa area: 97.75 sq ft (9.081 m^{2})
- Total sail area: 251.92 sq ft (23.404 m^{2})

Racing
- PHRF: 264

The Sea Sprite 23 is a recreational keelboat first built in 1958. It was built in two versions, the Daysailor and the Weekender. It was also called the Alberg 23 in 1970 when produced by C. E. Ryder. The design was built by American Boatbuilding, Wickford Shipyard, C. E. Ryder, the Sailstar Boat Company and the Beetle Boat Company in the United States, but it is now out of production.

== Design ==
Designed by Carl Alberg, the Sea Sprite 23 is built predominantly of fiberglass, with wood trim. It has a fractional sloop rig; a spooned, raked stem; a raised counter, angled, transom; a keel-mounted rudder controlled by a tiller and a fixed long keel. It displaces 3,350 lb (1,520 kg) and carries 1,400 lb (635 kg) of ballast.

The boat has a draft of 3.10 ft (0.94 m) with the standard keel.

The different builders incorporated different features in the design. Ryder's boats had an outboard motor well under a lazarette hatch cover, while Sailstar's used an open well. Ryder also used encapsulated lead ballast, while earlier builders used external, bolt-on lead ballast.

The boat is fitted with an inboard diesel engine of 7.5 hp (6 kW), or a small outboard motor for docking and maneuvering. The inboard version's fuel tank holds 8 U.S. gallons (30 L; 6.7 imp gal) and the fresh water tank has a capacity of 9.5 U.S. gallons (36 L; 7.9 imp gal).

The design has a PHRF racing average handicap of 264 and a hull speed of 5.4 kn (10.0 km/h).

== Variants ==
Sea Sprite 23 Daysailor
This model has a smaller cabin with two settee berths, but a longer cockpit. The cockpit has wooden seats and is not self-bailing, but the boat is equipped with a mainsheet traveler and a cabin-top stepped mast, with one set of lower shrouds.
Sea Sprite 23 Weekender
This model has a self-bailing cockpit, with molded fiberglass seats. It is not equipped with a mainsheet traveler. The mast is deck-stepped, forward of the coach house and there are two sets of lower shrouds. It a cabin with a companionway and steps. The cabin has sleeping accommodation for four people, with a double "V"-berth in the bow and two straight settee berths aft. The galley is located on both sides, just aft of the bow "V"-berth and is equipped with an ice box to port and a sink to starboard. This version was first built by Beetle Boats.

== Reception ==
In a 2010 review Steve Henkel wrote, "worst features: The somewhat shallow draft of three feet detracts a bit from upwind performance, although reaching and running is unaffected."
