= Odyssey 30 =

Canadian sailboat class

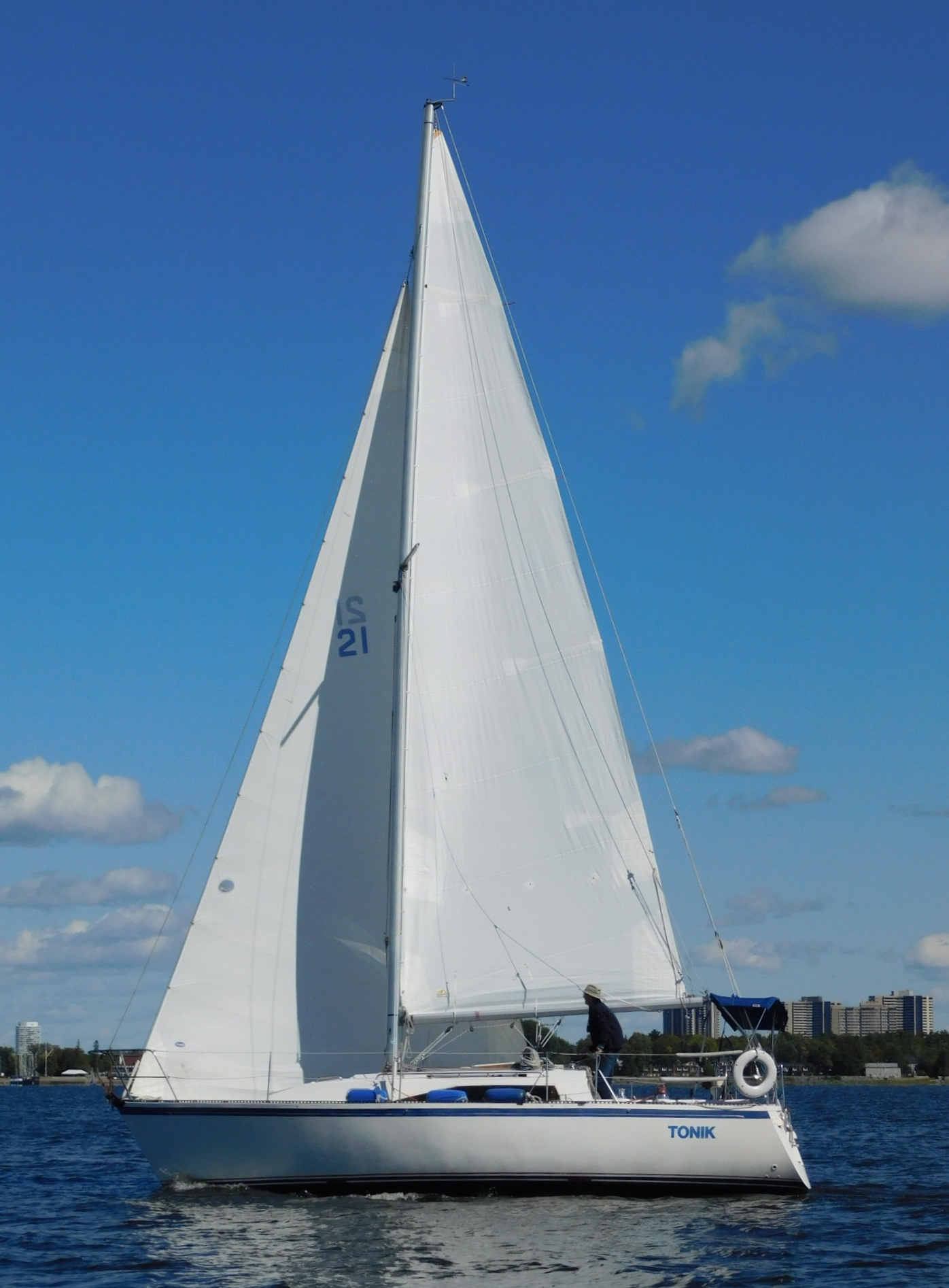

Development
- Designer: George Cuthbertson
- Location: Canada
- Year: 1987
- Builder: Ouyang Boat Works
- Name: Odyssey 30

Boat
- Displacement: 8,000 lb (3,629 kg)
- Draft: 5.50 ft (1.68 m)

Hull
- Type: Monohull
- Construction: Fibreglass
- LOA: 30.00 ft (9.14 m)
- LWL: 26.00 ft (7.92 m)
- Beam: 10.48 ft (3.19 m)
- Engine: Yanmar diesel engine

Hull appendages
- Keel: fin keel
- Rudder: internally-mounted spade-type rudder

Rig
- General: Fractional rigged sloop
- I foretriangle height: 41.00 ft (12.50 m)
- J foretriangle base: 11.50 ft (3.51 m)
- P mainsail luff: 38.00 ft (11.58 m)
- E mainsail foot: 12.50 ft (3.81 m)

Sails
- Mainsail area: 237.50 sq ft (22.064 m^{2})
- Jib/genoa area: 235.75 sq ft (21.902 m^{2})
- Total sail area: 473.25 sq ft (43.966 m^{2})

The Odyssey 30 is a Canadian sailboat, that was designed by George Cuthbertson of C&C Design and first built in 1987.

The design is often confused with a different boat with the same name, the Carl Alberg designed 1960 Odyssey 30.

== Production ==
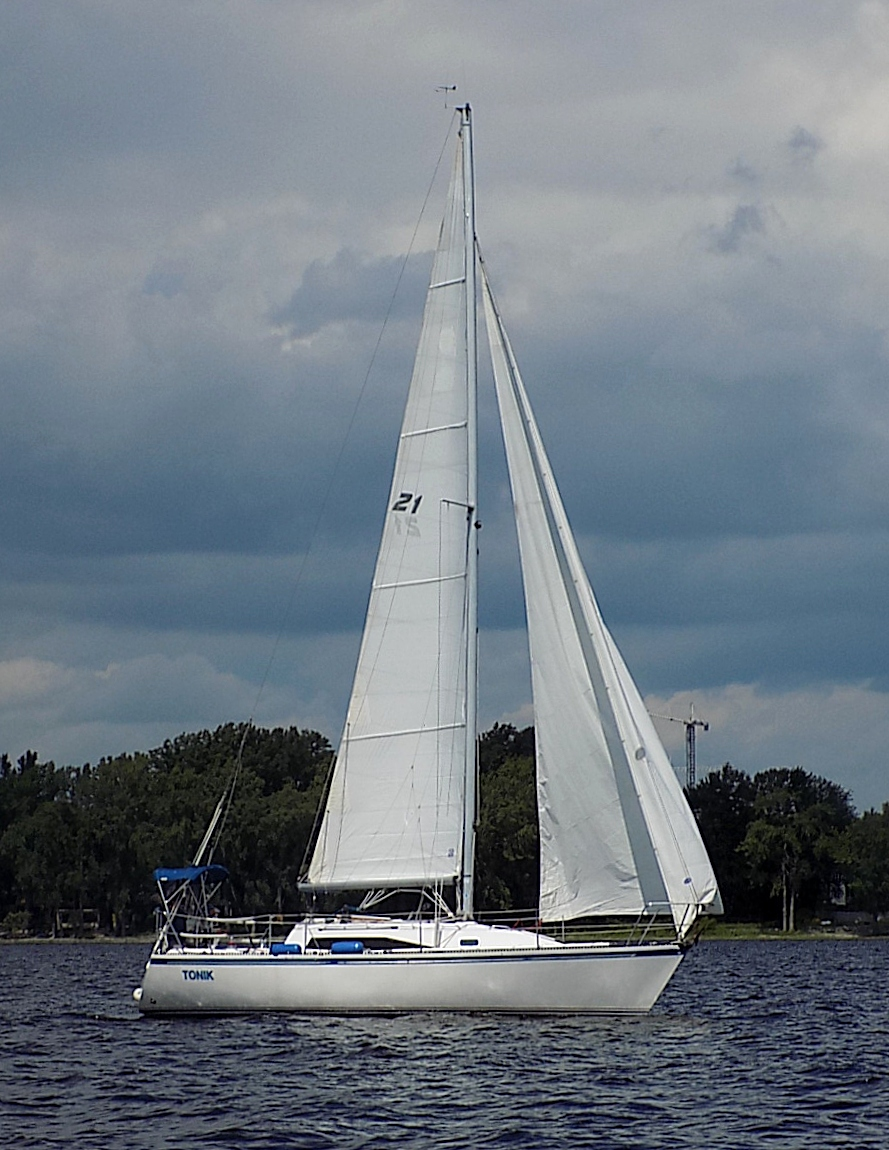
Odyssey 30

The Odyssey 30 came about after the owner of the Aloha Yachts brand and owner of the Ouyang Boat Works in Canada, Ti Ouyang, lost control of the Aloha company and formed a new company to produce the Odyssey boats. The Odyssey 30 is now out of production.

== Design ==
The Odyssey 30 is a small recreational keelboat, built predominantly of fibreglass, with wood trim. It has a fractional sloop rig, an internally-mounted spade-type rudder and a fixed fin keel. It displaces 8,000 lb (3,629 kg).

The boat has a draft of 5.50 ft (1.68 m) with the standard keel and is fitted with a Japanese Yanmar 2GM diesel engine.

The boat has a hull speed of 6.83 kn (12.65 km/h).

== See also ==
- List of sailing boat types
