= Typhoon Senior =

1980s American recreational keelboat

- T_{Y_{SR.}}

Development
- Designer: Carl Alberg
- Location: United States
- Year: 1984
- No. built: 57
- Builder: Cape Dory Yachts
- Role: Cruiser
- Name: Typhoon Senior

Boat
- Displacement: 3,300 lb (1,497 kg)
- Draft: 3.08 ft (0.94 m)

Hull
- Type: monohull
- Construction: fiberglass
- LOA: 22.42 ft (6.83 m)
- LWL: 16.50 ft (5.03 m)
- Beam: 7.42 ft (2.26 m)
- Engine: outboard motor

Hull appendages
- Keel: long keel
- Ballast: 1,700 lb (771 kg)
- Rudder: keel-mounted rudder

Rig
- Rig type: Bermuda rig
- I foretriangle height: 26.00 ft (7.92 m)
- J foretriangle base: 8.50 ft (2.59 m)
- P mainsail luff: 27.50 ft (8.38 m)
- E mainsail foot: 9.85 ft (3.00 m)

Sails
- Sailplan: fractional rigged sloop
- Mainsail area: 135.44 sq ft (12.583 m^{2})
- Jib/genoa area: 110.50 sq ft (10.266 m^{2})
- Total sail area: 245.94 sq ft (22.849 m^{2})

Racing
- PHRF: 273

The Typhoon Senior is a recreational keelboatbuilt by Cape Dory Yachts in the United States, with 57 boats completed between 1984 and 1987.

It is a development of the Cape Dory 22, using the same hull mold, but a new deck and rig. Designed by Carl Alberg, the fiberglass hull a spooned, raked stem; a raised counter, angled transom; a keel-mounted rudder controlled by a tiller and a fixed long keel. It has a hull speed of 5.4 kn (10.0 km/h).

The design has sleeping accommodation for four people, with a double "V"-berth in the bow cabin, and two straight settees in the main cabin. There is an ice box underneath the companionway ladder. The head is located under the bow cabin berth. Cabin headroom is 56 in (140 cm).

It has a fractional sloop rig.
