= South Coast 22 =

Sailboat class

Development
- Designer: Carl Alberg, James Monroe and Hollis Metcalf
- Location: United States
- Year: 1968
- No. built: more than 3,000
- Builder: South Coast Seacraft
- Role: Cruiser
- Name: South Coast 22

Boat
- Displacement: 1,800 lb (816 kg)
- Draft: 4.75 ft (1.45 m) with keel down

Hull
- Type: monohull
- Construction: fiberglass
- LOA: 22.00 ft (6.71 m)
- LWL: 17.50 ft (5.33 m)
- Beam: 7.08 ft (2.16 m)
- Engine: outboard motor

Hull appendages
- Keel: swing keel
- Ballast: 505 lb (229 kg)
- Rudder: transom-mounted rudder

Rig
- Rig type: Bermuda rig
- I foretriangle height: 26.00 ft (7.92 m)
- J foretriangle base: 8.90 ft (2.71 m)
- P mainsail luff: 23.00 ft (7.01 m)
- E mainsail foot: 9.75 ft (2.97 m)

Sails
- Sailplan: masthead sloop
- Mainsail area: 112.13 sq ft (10.417 m^{2})
- Jib/genoa area: 115.70 sq ft (10.749 m^{2})
- Total sail area: 227.83 sq ft (21.166 m^{2})

Racing
- PHRF: 276

The South Coast 22 is an American trailerable sailboat that was designed by Carl Alberg, James Monroe and Hollis Metcalf as a pocket cruiser and first built in 1968.

The design is a development of Alberg's South Coast 21, with Monroe and Metcalf modifying the boat by adding a larger cabin, lengthening the boat slightly and employing a swing keel. It was later developed into the Northbridge Eclipse.

== Production ==
The design was built by South Coast Seacraft in United States, starting in 1968. It became the company's most popular product, with over 3,000 completed, but it is now out of production.

== Design ==
The South Coast 22 is a recreational keelboat, built predominantly of fiberglass, with wood trim. It has a masthead sloop rig, a spooned raked stem, an angled transom, a transom-hung rudder controlled by a tiller and a retractable swing keel. It displaces 1,800 lb (816 kg), carries 505 lb (229 kg) of ballast and has foam flotation for positive buoyancy.

A cabin pop-top was an option on later production boats.

The boat has a draft of 4.75 ft (1.45 m) with the swing keel extended and 0.83 ft (0.25 m) with it retracted, allowing operation in shallow water, beaching or ground transportation on a trailer.

The boat is normally fitted with a small 3 to 6 hp (2 to 4 kW) outboard motor for docking and maneuvering.

The South Coast 22 has sleeping accommodation for five people, with a double "V"-berth in the bow cabin, a dinette table in the main cabin that drops down to form a double berth and an aft quarter berth on the starboard side. The galley is located on the starboard side just aft of the bow cabin. The head is located just aft of the bow cabin on the port side. Cabin headroom is 51 in (130 cm) and the fresh water tank has a capacity of 12 U.S. gallons (45 L; 10.0 imp gal).

The design has a PHRF racing average handicap of 276 and a hull speed of 5.6 kn (10.4 km/h).

== Operational history ==
The boat is supported by an active class club that organizes racing events, the South Coast Seacraft Owners' Association.

In a 2010 review Steve Henkel wrote, "Hollis Metcalf, owner of South Coast Seacraft, was a southern gentleman who sold a South Coast 23 kit to my wife and me in 1964 ... Metcalf, who had commissioned Carl Alberg to design the SC21, wanted to market a similar but more spacious and more easily trailerable version, and ended up designing the SC22 himself. The resulting boat was not a racer (note the high PHRF) but nevertheless was quite popular. Best features: The long, deep, heavily weighted board should help upwind performance and stability ... the SC22 is relatively low-slung (limiting cabin space but improving sailing performance). Accommodations seem reasonably complete, with sleeping space for five—though we doubt five adults would want to cruise in such tight quarters ... Worst features: The outboard rudder on a raked transom may lead to trouble if the outboard motor is not mounted well aft of the transom to avoid prop interference. But an outboard mounted that far back may be subject to prop cavitation. The SC22 may have dimensional stats similar to her comp[etitor]s, but her PHRF rating clearly shows she is not in the same league of racing performance as, say, the J/22."

== See also ==
- List of sailing boat types
