= South Coast Seacraft =

Sailboat manufacturer

South Coast Seacraft Company
- Company type: Privately held company
- Industry: Boat building
- Founded: 1965
- Founder: Hollis Metcalf
- Defunct: 1981
- Headquarters: Shreveport, Louisiana, United States
- Products: Sailboats

The South Coast Seacraft Company was an American boat builder based in Shreveport, Louisiana. The company specialized in the design and manufacture of fiberglass sailboats.

The company was founded by Hollis Metcalf in 1965.

== History ==
The first two designs produced were Carl Alberg designs, the South Coast 23 and South Coast 21, both introduced in 1965.

The company supplied completed, ready-to-sail boats and also kits for amateur completion.

To adapt the South Coast 21 to become a trailerable sailboat for that emerging market in the late 1960s, Metcalf and his chief engineer, James Munroe, made changes to the South Coast 21 to create the South Coast 22, introduced in 1968. It incorporated a larger interior and a swing keel to facilitate trailer transportation. The boat became the company's best selling product, with more than 3,000 built.

Hollis Metcalf was training his son, Warren Metcalf, to take over the company. Warren Metcalf actually designed the South Coast 25, but just as he was completing the design he died in a diving accident. As a result of Warren Metcalf's death, Hollis Metcalf decided to sell the company in 1975 to a Chicago-based group of three investors, Michael Hennessy, John Kleine and Don Weir, who named it the South Coast Seacraft Corporation. The new owners operated the company until it went out of business in 1981.

By the time it closed, South Coast Seacraft had built over 4,000 boats.

== Boats ==
Summary of boats built by South Coast Seacraft:

- South Coast 21 - 1965
- South Coast 23 - 1965
- Herreshoff Rozinante - 1965
- South Coast 22 - 1968
- South Coast 25 - 1969
- South Coast 26 - 1977
- Eclipse 6.7 - 1978

== See also ==
- List of sailboat designers and manufacturers
