= South Coast 26 =

1970s US recreational keelboat

Development
- Designer: James Monroe
- Location: United States
- Year: 1977
- Builder: South Coast Seacraft
- Role: Cruiser

Boat
- Displacement: 3,300 lb (1,497 kg)
- Draft: 3.67 ft (1.12 m) with keel down

Hull
- Type: monohull
- Construction: fiberglass
- LOA: 25.83 ft (7.87 m)
- LWL: 23.25 ft (7.09 m)
- Beam: 7.92 ft (2.41 m)
- Engine: outboard motor

Hull appendages
- Keel: lifting keel
- Ballast: 960 lb (435 kg)
- Rudder: transom-mounted rudder

Rig
- Rig type: Bermuda rig
- I foretriangle height: 39.80 ft (12.13 m)
- J foretriangle base: 9.40 ft (2.87 m)
- P mainsail luff: 25.00 ft (7.62 m)
- E mainsail foot: 9.30 ft (2.83 m)

Sails
- Sailplan: masthead sloop
- Mainsail area: 116.25 sq ft (10.800 m^{2})
- Jib/genoa area: 187.06 sq ft (17.378 m^{2})
- Total sail area: 303.31 sq ft (28.178 m^{2})

The South Coast 26 is a recreational keelboat that was designed by James Monroe and first built in 1977.

== Production ==
The design was built by South Coast Seacraft in United States, starting in 1977, but it is now out of production.

== Design ==
The South Coast 26 is built predominantly of fiberglass, with wood trim. It has a masthead sloop rig; a raked stem; a reverse transom; a transom-hung, vertically lifting wooden rudder controlled by a tiller and a lifting keel with a weighted bulb. It was built in aft cockpit and center cockpit versions. It displaces 3,300 lb (1,497 kg) and carries 960 lb (435 kg) of ballast.

The boat has a draft of 3.67 ft (1.12 m) with the keel extended and 1.82 ft (0.55 m) with it retracted, allowing operation in shallow water, beaching or ground transportation on a trailer.

The boat is normally fitted with a small outboard motor for docking and maneuvering.

The design has sleeping accommodation for four people, with a double "V"-berth in the bow cabin and two straight settee berths in the main cabin. The galley is located on the starboard side just forward of the companionway ladder. The galley is equipped with a two-burner stove. The enclosed head is located opposite the galley on the port side.

For sailing, the design may be equipped with a 150% or 170% genoa.

The design has a hull speed of 6.46 kn (11.96 km/h).
