= South Coast 21 =

1960s US recreational keelboat

Development
- Designer: Carl Alberg
- Location: United States
- Year: 1965
- No. built: 300
- Builder: South Coast Seacraft
- Role: Day sailer

Boat
- Displacement: 2,000 lb (907 kg)
- Draft: 3.00 ft (0.91 m)

Hull
- Type: monohull
- Construction: fiberglass
- LOA: 21.00 ft (6.40 m)
- LWL: 14.33 ft (4.37 m)
- Beam: 6.92 ft (2.11 m)
- Engine: outboard motor

Hull appendages
- Keel: fin keel
- Ballast: 625 lb (283 kg)
- Rudder: internally-mounted spade-type rudder

Rig
- Rig type: Bermuda rig
- I foretriangle height: 22.00 ft (6.71 m)
- J foretriangle base: 7.30 ft (2.23 m)
- P mainsail luff: 24.00 ft (7.32 m)
- E mainsail foot: 10.50 ft (3.20 m)

Sails
- Sailplan: fractional rigged sloop
- Mainsail area: 126.00 sq ft (11.706 m^{2})
- Jib/genoa area: 80.30 sq ft (7.460 m^{2})
- Total sail area: 206.30 sq ft (19.166 m^{2})

Racing
- PHRF: 252

The South Coast 21 is a recreational keelboat designed by Carl Alberg and first built in 1965.

The boat was later developed into the slightly longer, swing keel South Coast 22.

== Production ==
The design was built by South Coast Seacraft in the United States, between 1965 and 1979, with 300 boats completed, but it is now out of production.

The boat was produced complete and ready-to-sail and also as a kit for amateur completion.

== Design ==
The South Coast 21 is a recreational keelboat, built predominantly of fiberglass, with wood trim. It has a fractional sloop with 206.30 sq ft (19.166 m^{2}) of sail area or with an optional masthead sloop rig and 226.38 sq ft (21.031 m^{2}) of sail area. The hull has a spooned, raked stem; a raised counter, angled transom, an internally mounted spade-type rudder controlled by a tiller and a fixed fin keel. It displaces 2,000 lb (907 kg) and carries 625 lb (283 kg) of ballast.

The boat has a draft of 3.00 ft (0.91 m) with the standard keel.

The boat is normally fitted with a small 3 to 6 hp (2 to 4 kW) outboard motor for docking and maneuvering.

The design has sleeping accommodation for two people, with two straight settee berths in the main cabin. There are no provisions or space for a galley or a head. Cabin headroom is 39 in (99 cm).

The design was changed during production to address issues that became apparent in service. Starting with hull number 91 the keel was moved aft to reduce weather helm. This did not entirely solve the issue and later the rudder was enlarged as well.

The design has a PHRF racing average handicap of 252 and a hull speed of 5.1 kn (9.4 km/h).

== Operational history ==
The boat is supported by an active class club that organizes racing events, the South Coast Seacraft Owners' Association.

In a 2010 review Steve Henkel wrote, "the classic low freeboard, narrow beam, and Star Boat-like underbody appeal to us as being a great combination for daysailing and club one-design racing. But somehow the SC21 never caught on in any big way on the club racing circuit. Too bad. Best features: We imagine the hull configuration gives a good combination of speed and comfort ... Worst features: There is not much space below, even for overnighting—basically a pair of settee berths with almost non-existent (3' 3") headroom, and that's it. No space for a galley or even to store a porta-potti. We'd worry slightly about that rudder tucked away under the counter. Does it have weed dragging us down? If so, we couldn't see it without hanging way over the side, and then only if the water was clear. Launching and retrieving at a ramp might give some trouble because of the relatively deep fin keel. The one cockpit drain is aft on the centerline, rather than the more preferable two drains in the corners, to remove water when the vessel is heeled. And the plan shows a flat cockpit sole; it should be angled downwind aft for drainage."
