= Alberg Odyssey 30 =

Sailboat class

Odyssey 30
Development
- Designer: Carl Alberg
- Location: United States
- Year: 1960
- No. built: 15
- Name: Odyssey 30

Boat
- Displacement: 11,000 lb (4,990 kg)
- Draft: 4.50 ft (1.37 m)

Hull
- Type: Monohull
- Construction: Fiberglass
- LOA: 30.30 ft (9.24 m)
- LWL: 21.00 ft (6.40 m)
- Beam: 8.75 ft (2.67 m)

Hull appendages
- Keel: fin keel
- Ballast: 3,600 lb (1,633 kg)

Rig
- General: Fractional rigged sloop

The Odyssey 30 is an American sailboat, that was designed by Carl Alberg and first built in 1960 in the San Francisco bay area. A total of 15 examples were completed.

Many of the design elements of the Odyssey 30 were used in the Alberg 30 of 1962.

The design is often confused with a different boat with the same name, the George Cuthbertson-designed 1987 Odyssey 30.

== Design ==
The Odyssey 30 is a small recreational keelboat, built predominantly of fiberglass, with wood trim. It has a fractional sloop and a fixed fin keel. It displaces 11,000 lb (4,990 kg) and carries 3,600 lb (1,633 kg) of ballast.

The boat has a draft of 4.50 ft (1.37 m) with the standard keel and a hull speed of 6.14 kn (11.37 km/h).

== See also ==
- List of sailing boat types
