= Cape Dory Yachts =

US boat builder

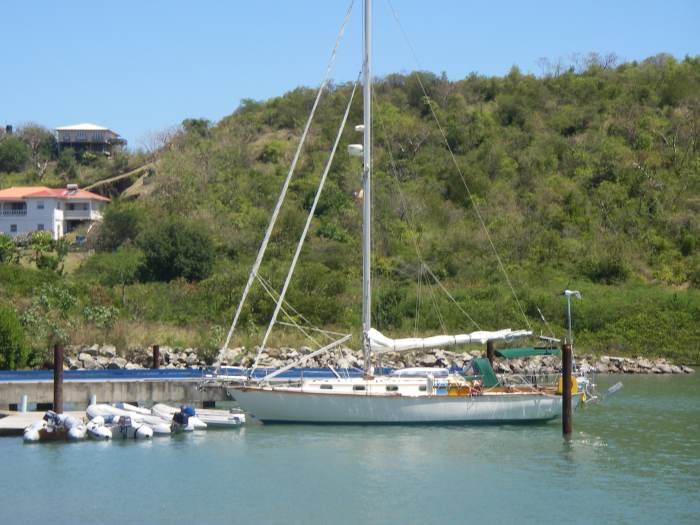
- A Cape Dory 36 cruising in the Caribbean
- Founded: 1963, Bridgewater, Massachusetts
- Founder: Andrew Vavolotis
- Defunct: 1992
- Headquarters: Taunton, Massachusetts

Cape Dory Yachts was a Massachusetts-based builder of fiberglass sailboats, powerboats, and pleasure trawlers which operated from 1963 to 1992. It also produced a small number of commercial craft.

== History ==
The company was founded in 1963 by Andrew Vavolotis in Bridgewater, Massachusetts. It began building a small fiberglass sailing dinghy, the Cape Dory 10. Later it moved to a facility in Taunton, Massachusetts, producing thousands of boats during the company's lifespan. After the dingy it introduced the popular Typhoon series of small sailboats, then cruising yachts ranging from 22 to 45 feet.

Carl Alberg designed many of the company's models, favoring simple lines, narrow beams, and often utilizing a full keel for superior handling in heavier winds and seas. Together they gave these boats the classic Cape Dory look. Alberg combined a full keel with attached rudder for a sleek and sturdy shape.

In later years the company added pleasure powerboats and trawlers and some commercial boats to its output.

The Cape Dory 25D has been single-handed across both the Atlantic (New York to Ireland) and Pacific (California to Australia) oceans and a solo circumnavigation was completed in a Cape Dory 28.

A division was Intrepid Yachts, which built the Intrepid 28 starting in 1979, among other designs.

When Cape Dory folded in 1992 it sold a number of its designs to New York's Newport Shipyards, which ceased operations in 1996. The hull molds and designs for several models were then acquired by Robinhood Marine, headed by Cape Dory founder Vavolotis, which was making them available as semi-custom yachts.

== Models ==
Model	Years Built	Number Produced	LOA	LWL	Beam	Draft	Displacement
Cape Dory 10	1964–1983	2260	10' 6"		49"	5" (board up); 24" (board down)	~150 lbs.
Cape Dory 14	1964–1973	652	14' 6"		51"	6" (board up); 36" (board down)	~200 lbs.
Typhoon Daysailer	1977–1986	141	18' 6"	13' 6"	6' 3 1/2"	2' 7"	1,900 lbs.
Typhoon Weekender	1967–1986	1982	18' 6"	13' 11"	6' 3"	2' 7"	2,000 lbs.
Typhoon Senior	1984–1987	57	22' 5"	16' 6"	7' 5"	3' 1"	3,300 lbs.
Cape Dory 22/22D	1981–1985	176	22' 4"	16' 3"	7' 4"	3'	3,200 lbs.
Cape Dory 24 Trawler	1982–1985	17	24'	22' 4 1/2"	8'	2' 7"	5,250 lbs.
Cape Dory 25	1973–1982	845	24' 10"	18'	7' 3"	3'	4,000 lbs.
Cape Dory 25D	1981–1985	189	25'	19'	8'	3' 6"	5,120 lbs.
Cape Dory 26	1976–1984	78	25' 11"	19' 3"	8'	3' 7"	5,300 lbs.
Cape Dory 27	1976–1984	277	27' 1"	20'	8' 6"	4'	7,500 lbs.
Cape Dory 270	1984–1986	21	27' 3"	20' 9"	9' 5"	3' (board up); 7' (board down)	8,380 lbs.
Cape Dory 28	1974–1987	389	28' 1 3/4"	22' 2 1/2"	8' 10 1/2"	4'	9,000 lbs.
Cape Dory 28 (powerboat) open, sport, cruiser	1984–1990	223		25' 11"	9' 11"	2' 11"	6,500 lbs.(Sport); 7,000 lbs.(Open); 8,000 lbs.(Cruiser)
Cape 30	1972–?	6	30'	20' 2"	9' 2 1/2"	4' 5 1'2"	9,350 lbs.
Cape Dory 30	1976–1986	363	30' 2 1/2"	22' 10"	9'	4' 2"	10,000 lbs.
Cape Dory 30 MkII	1987–1990	31		24' 2"	10' 6"	4' 6"	10,500 lbs.
Cape Dory 300 (Motorsailer)	1985–1990	47		26' 6"	11' 5"	3' 11"	11,500 lbs.
Cape Dory 30 (powerboat)	1989–1990	15	32' 0"		12' 0"	2' 10"	12,800 lbs.
Cape Dory 31	1982–1985	89	31' 4"	23' 3"	9' 9"	4' 9"	11,500 lbs.
Cape Dory 32	1985–1987	11	32' 2"	24' 2"	9' 11"	4' 11"	11,750 lbs.
Cape Dory 33	1980–1985	120	33' 1/2"	24' 6"	10' 3"	4' 10"	13,300 lbs.
Cape Dory 330	1985–1988	27	35' 4"	24' 6"	10' 3"	4' 10"	13,300 lbs.
Cape Dory 33 (powerboat)	1988–1990	22		30' 0"	12' 2"	2' 11"	13,500 lbs.
Cape Dory 36	1978–1990	165	36' 1 1/2"	27'	10' 8"	5'	16,100 lbs.
Cape Dory 36 (powerboat)	1987–1990	14		31' 7"	13' 6"	3' 6"	18,000 lbs.
Cape Dory 38 (powerboat)							
Cape Dory 40	1984–1989	16		30'	11' 8"	5' 8"	19,500 lbs.
Cape Dory 40 Trawler	1992–1994				13' 10"	3' 9"	25,000 lbs.
Cape Dory 42 (powerboat)	1983–1987	14			13' 7"	6' 0"	
Cape Dory 45		3					

== See also ==
- List of sailboat designers and manufacturers
