= Sam Holmes (sailor) =

American sailor, vlogger

- Occupations: Sailor; vlogger

Instagram information
- Page: samholmessailing
- Followers: 29.9 thousand

YouTube information
- Channel: Sam Holmes Sailing
- Years active: 2006‍–‍present
- Genres: Sailing; cruising; travel
- Views: 41.2 million
- Last updated: August 2025

Sam Holmes is a vlogger and solo sailor best known for his YouTube channel, Sam Holmes Sailing. Holmes records journeys on his YouTube channel, including sailing from California to Hawaii in a Ranger 23 sailboat, and crossing the Atlantic to Europe in his Cape Dory 28.

Holmes created some controversy while sailing in Svalbard. He brought his boat up to a glacier at sea to get ice, turned his AIS off while underway, and hiked without a rifle despite warnings about polar bears in the area.
