= Alberg 30 =

Sailboat class

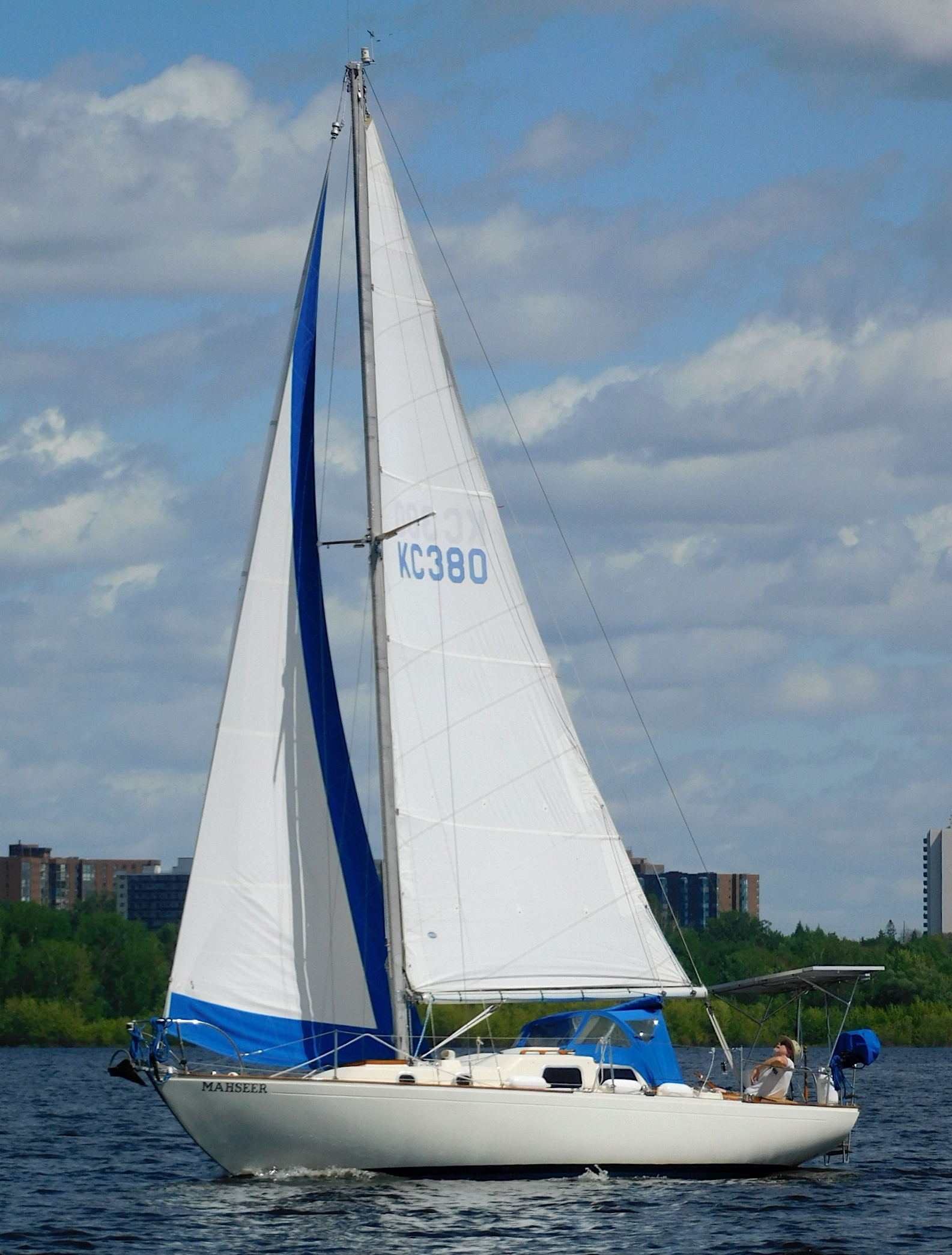

Development
- Designer: Carl Alberg
- Location: Canada
- Year: 1962
- No. built: over 700
- Builder: Whitby Boat Works

Boat
- Displacement: 9,000 lb (4,082 kg)
- Draft: 4.29 ft (1.31 m)

Hull
- Type: Monohull
- Construction: Fibreglass
- LOA: 30.27 ft (9.23 m)
- LWL: 21.67 ft (6.61 m)
- Beam: 8.75 ft (2.67 m)
- Engine: Universal Atomic 4 30 hp (22 kW) gasoline engine

Hull appendages
- Keel: long keel
- Ballast: 3,300 lb (1,497 kg) of iron
- Rudder: Keel-mounted rudder

Rig
- General: Masthead sloop
- I foretriangle height: 36.00 ft (10.97 m)
- J foretriangle base: 10.50 ft (3.20 m)
- P mainsail luff: 31.00 ft (9.45 m)
- E mainsail foot: 14.25 ft (4.34 m)

Sails
- Mainsail area: 220.88 sq ft (20.520 m^{2})
- Jib/genoa area: 189.00 sq ft (17.559 m^{2})
- Total sail area: 409.88 sq ft (38.079 m^{2})

Rating
- PHRF: 228 (average)

The Alberg 30 is a Canadian sailboat, that was designed by Carl Alberg and first built in 1962.

The Alberg 30 incorporates design elements from the similar Alberg Odyssey 30 of two years earlier.

== Production ==
The boat was built by Whitby Boat Works in Canada, who completed more than 700 examples between 1962 and 1987, but it is now out of production.

Construction was changed during the production run. Early models have a laminated wood mast brace and no liner, with a masonite-cored deck that drains overboard via the toe rail. Later models feature an aluminum mast brace inside a molded fiberglass liner, balsa-cored decks that drain through cockpit scupper drain hoses. Some boats built during the transitional period have mixed features.

== Design ==
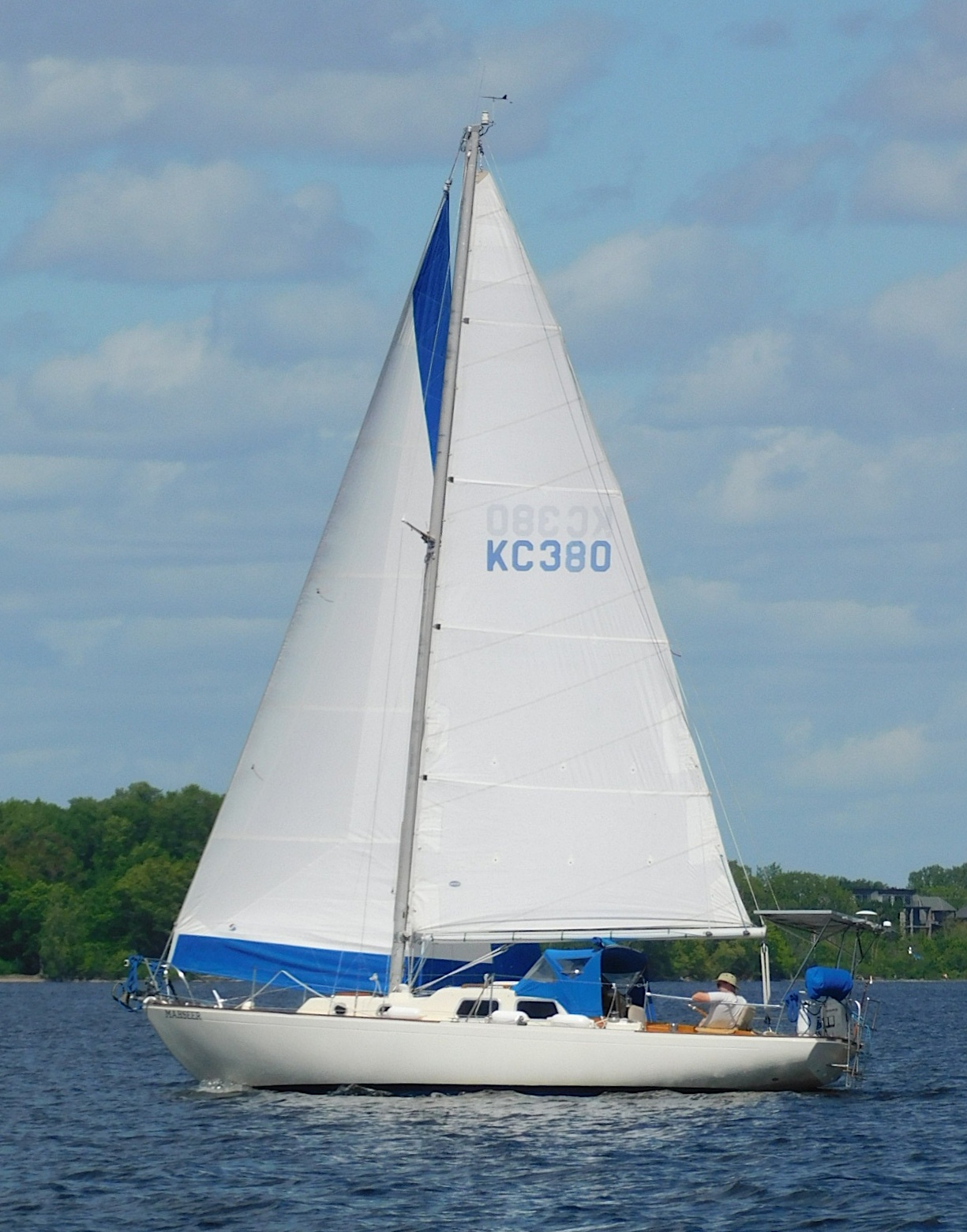
Alberg 30

The Alberg 30 is a recreational keelboat, built predominantly of fibreglass, with wood trim. It has a masthead sloop rig, a keel-mounted rudder and a fixed long keel. It displaces 9,000 lb (4,082 kg) and carries 3,300 lb (1,497 kg) of iron ballast.

The boat has a draft of 4.29 ft (1.31 m) with the standard keel.

The boat was factory fitted with a range of inboard engines. These included a Gray Marine gasoline engine of 22 hp (16 kW), a Universal Atomic 4 gasoline engine of 30 hp (22 kW), a Bukh single cylinder diesel engine of 12 hp (9 kW), a Volvo Penta MD7A diesel engine or a Volvo 2002 diesel engine. The fuel tank holds 15 U.S. gallons (57 L; 12 imp gal) and the fresh water tank has a capacity of 30 U.S. gallons (110 L; 25 imp gal).

The boat has a PHRF racing average handicap of 228 with a high of 240 and low of 219. It has a hull speed of 6.23 kn (11.54 km/h).

== Operational history ==
In a review Michael McGoldrick wrote, "The design of the Alberg 30 dates back to 1961, and some of its features and appearance are reminiscent of the old wooded sailboats of the 1950s and 1940s. It is interesting to note that when they first started making sailboats out of fiberglass, they tended to build up the hull and other structural areas to the same thickness that would have been found on wooden boats. This extra fiberglass resulted in extremely strong and rugged boats, and this is certainly true of the Alberg 30. In terms of both design and construction, it is one of the more seaworthy 30 footers available on the used market in Canada. Nevertheless, the age of the Alberg 30 design translates into a boat with a narrow beam and limited interior room, and its full keel means it will not have the same pointing ability as a fin keel boat. But the Alberg 30 has a truly devoted following who believe its time-honoured appearance will not go out of style, and who appreciate the boat for its bluewater cruising potential."

== See also ==
- List of sailing boat types
