= Carl Alberg =

Swedish born yacht designer (1901–1986)

Carl Alberg (11 April 1901 – 31 August 1986) was a Swedish born naval architect known for his influence in early fiberglass boats.

== Career ==
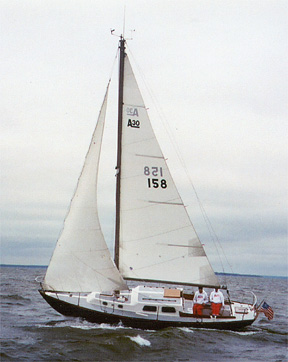
An Alberg 30, built in 1966

Alberg moved to the United States in 1925 where he began working as a rigger then later as a spar maker. Alberg was then hired by John Alden as a designer.

His successful career and current fame as a designer however can be linked back to his partnership with Pearson Yachts and early fiberglass yacht construction. Their first collaboration was the Pearson Triton, a 28 foot fiberglass yacht which today is still frequently seen sailing oceans around the world. Alberg later designed several other models for Pearson yachts. He also designed the first model for Bristol yachts.

One of his most famous and popular designs is also one of his earliest, the Alberg 30 which was built by Whitby Boatworks in Canada as a one design club racer. This boat had a record breaking production run of over 750 boats spanning 22 years and proved a good platform for ocean cruising.

Another successful partnership was with Cape Dory Yachts who produced 10 different models designed by Alberg.

== Designs ==
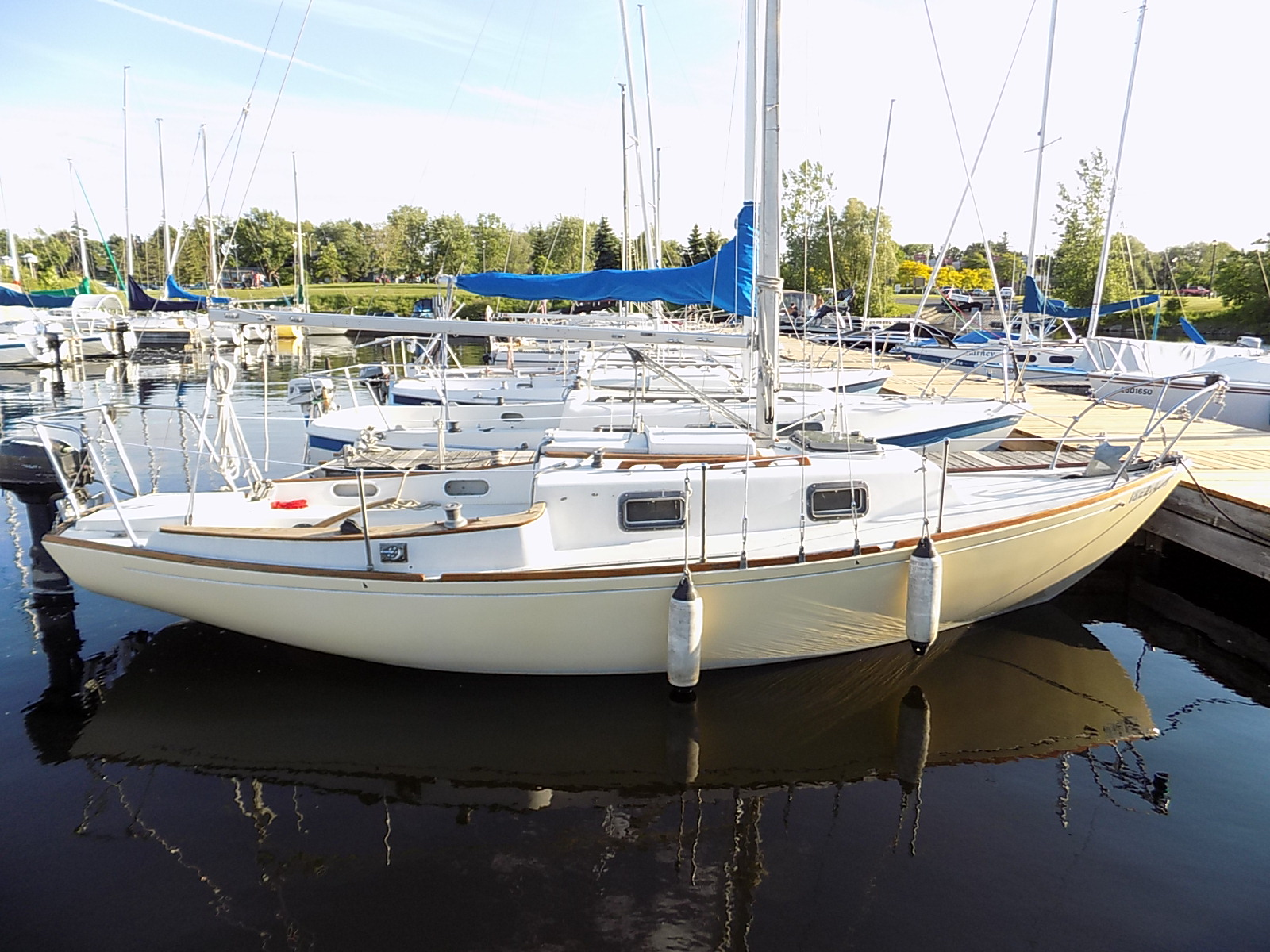
Alberg 22

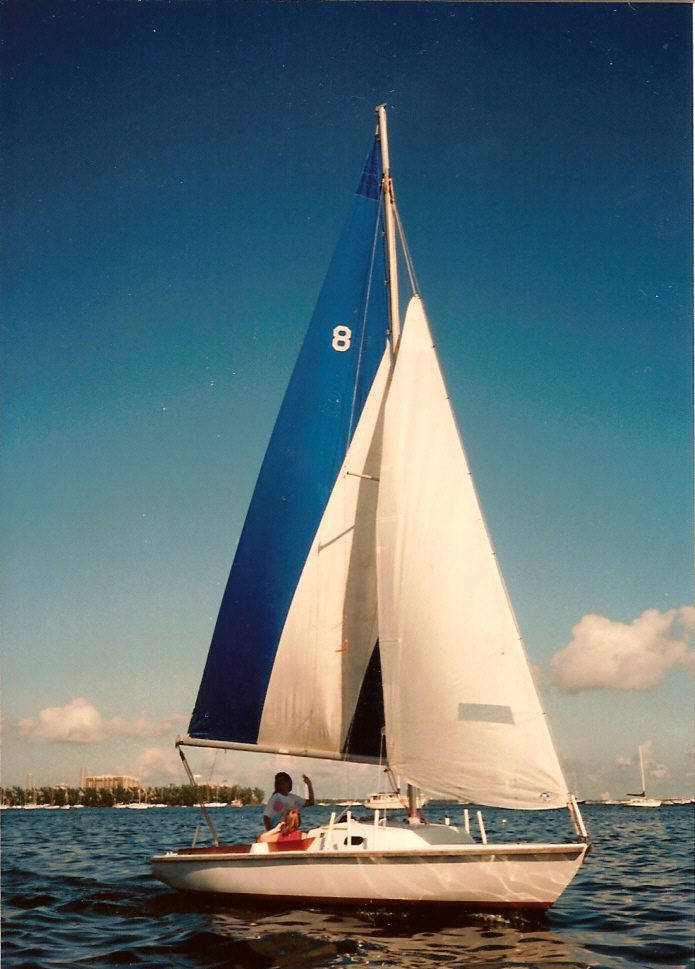
Pearson Ensign

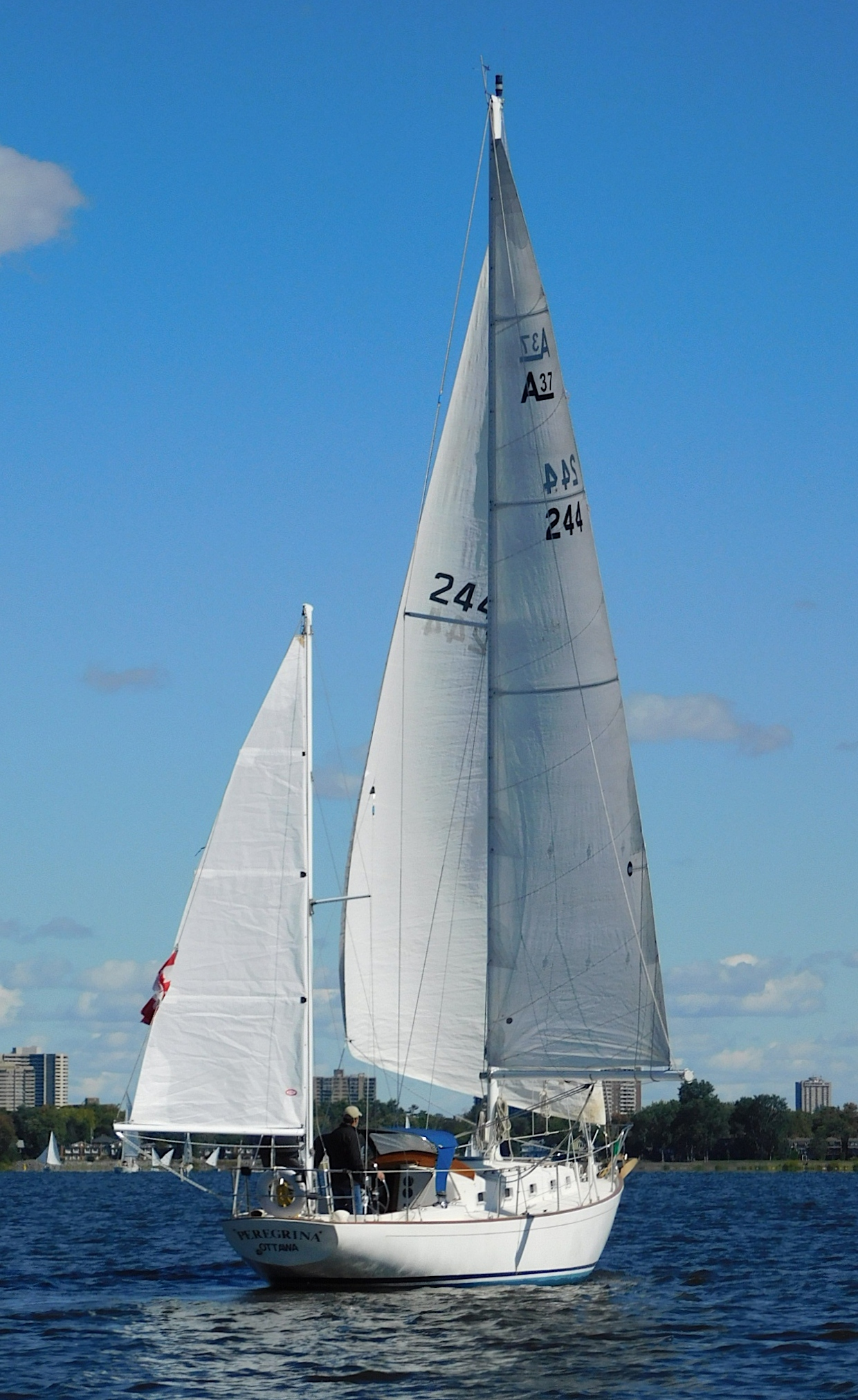
Alberg 37 Yawl

Alberg's boat designs include:

- Malabar Junior - 1935
- Coastwise Cruiser - 1938
- Hinckley 21 - 1946
- US One-Design - 1946
- Pearson Triton - 1958
- Sea Sprite 23 - 1958
- Odyssey 30 - 1960
- Pearson Electra - 1960
- Alberg 35 - 1961
- Hawk 16 - 1961
- Alberg 30 - 1962
- Arial 26 - 1962
- Pearson Ensign - 1962
- Douglas 22 - 1963
- North American 22 - 1963
- Commander 26 - 1964
- Jouet Triton - 1965
- South Coast 21 - 1965
- South Coast 23 - 1965
- Bristol 19 - 1966
- Bristol 27 - 1966
- Corinthian 19 - 1966
- Kittiwake 23 - 1966
- Alberg 37 - 1967
- South Coast 22 - 1968
- Alberg 22 - 1970
- Alberg 23 - 1970
- Cape Dory 28 - 1974
- Typhoon 18 - 1974
- Alberg 29 - 1976
- Cape Dory 30C - 1976
- Cape Dory 30K - 1976
- Cape Dory 27 - 1977
- Cape Dory 36 - 1978
- Eclipse 6.7 - 1978
- Cape Dory 33 - 1980
- Cape Dory 22 - 1981
- Cape Dory 25D - 1981
- Cape Dory 45 - 1982
- Cape Dory 31 - 1983
- Alberg 34 - 1984
- Cape Dory 26 - 1984
- Cape Dory 40 - 1984
- Typhoon Senior - 1984
- Cape Dory 330 - 1985
- Cape Dory 32 - 1986
- Robinhood 36 - 1992
- Robinhood 40 - 1996
