= Holly Martin =

American solo sailor and sailing vlogger (born 1994)

- Born: 1994 (age 31–32); New Zealand
- Occupations: Sailor; sailing vlogger

YouTube information
- Channel: Wind Hippie Sailing
- Years active: 2011‍–‍present
- Genres: Sailing; cruising; travel
- Views: 15.1 million
- Last updated: August 2025

Holly Martin is a solo sailor and sailing vlogger best known for sailing her 27-foot sloop Gecko as part of her YouTube channel, Wind Hippie Sailing.

Martin sails a Grinde 27 foot double ender sloop that she purchased in Connecticut and returned to Maine, where she spent over a year preparing to make her seaworthy.

Martin's goal of completing a circumnavigation started in October 2018, when she left Round Pond Maine and headed towards the Panama Canal. After spending a year in the Caribbean, she transited the Panama Canal and entered the Pacific Ocean in May 2020. She made a 41-day solo passage to French Polynesia, which she was unable to leave due to COVID-19 restrictions.

While underway, Martin enjoys reading, and at anchor she enjoys snorkeling, catching fish, and meeting new people.

Born in New Zealand, Martin grew up on boats with her parents, first on a Cal 25, as they sailed in the south Pacific, and later the Arctic, where she spent time being schooled in Iceland, Norway, and Canada.

She holds a degree in marine biology, and worked aboard an Antarctic research vessel as a research support technician.
