= Lazarette =

Boat stern storage compartmant

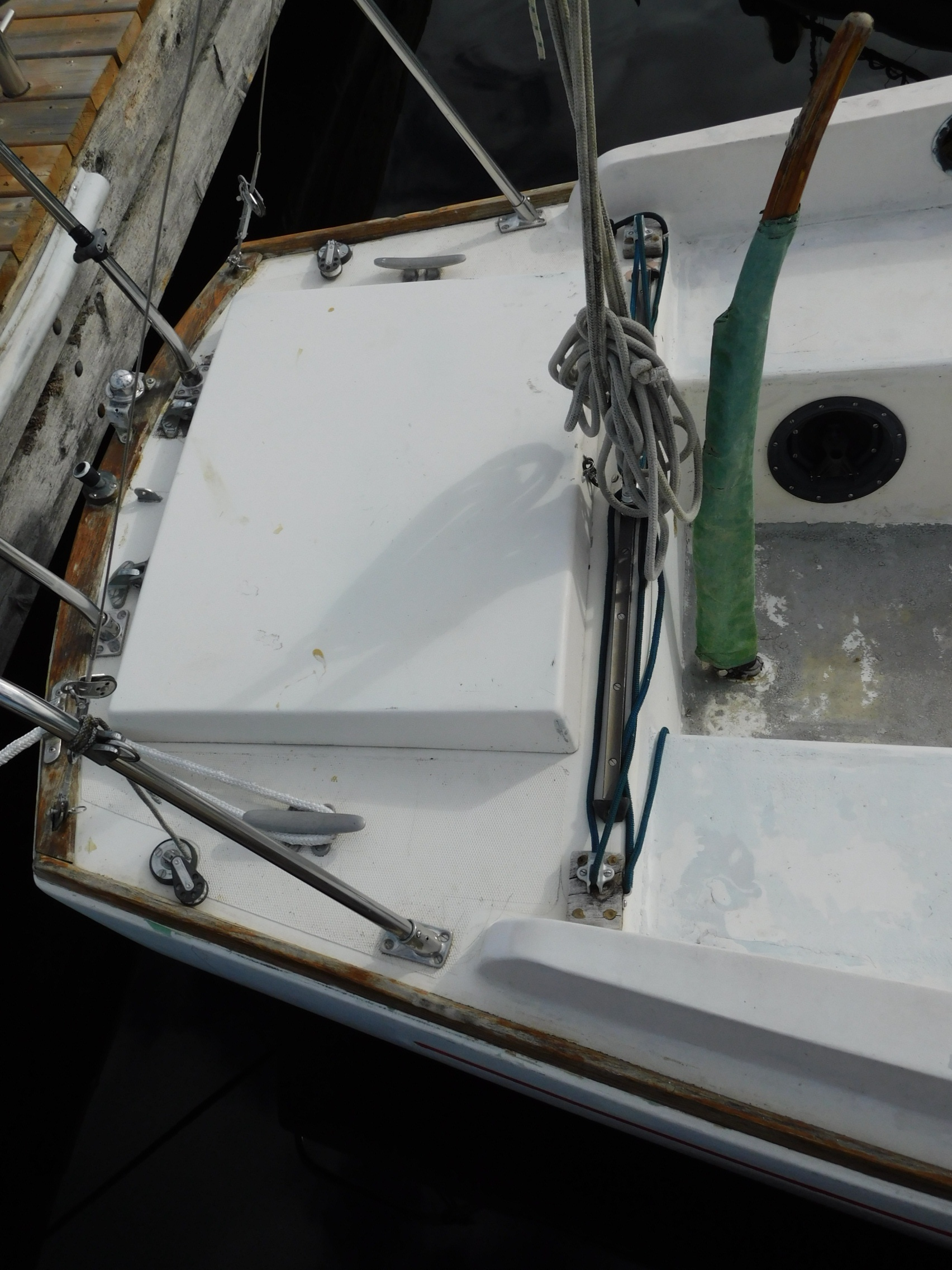
The lazarette on an Alberg 22 sailboat

The lazarette or lazaret (sometimes lazaretto) of a boat is an area near or aft of the cockpit. The word is similar to and probably derived from lazaretto. A lazarette is usually a storage locker used for gear or equipment a sailor or boatswain would use around the decks on a sailing vessel.

It is typically found below the weather deck in the stern of the vessel and is accessed through a cargo hatch (if accessed from the main deck) or a doorway (if accessed from below decks). The equipment usually stored in a lazarette would be spare lines, sails, sail repair, line and cable splicing repair equipment, fenders, bosun chair, spare blocks, tools, and other equipment.

The name derives from the Biblical story of Saint Lazarus, who in Christian belief was raised from the dead out of the tomb by Jesus.

On the old square-rigged sailing ships it was located in the stern of the ship. The original purpose was to store the bodies of important passengers or crew who had died on the voyage (lesser seamen would be buried at sea). In modern shipbuilding and for powerboats of most sizes, the lazarette is the location of the steering gear equipment for the vessel. This area is particularly sensitive to flooding and damage, because the large hull penetrations required for rudder and propulsion shafts usually pass through the vessel's hull there.
