= Transom (nautical) =

Flat part of a boat's squared stern

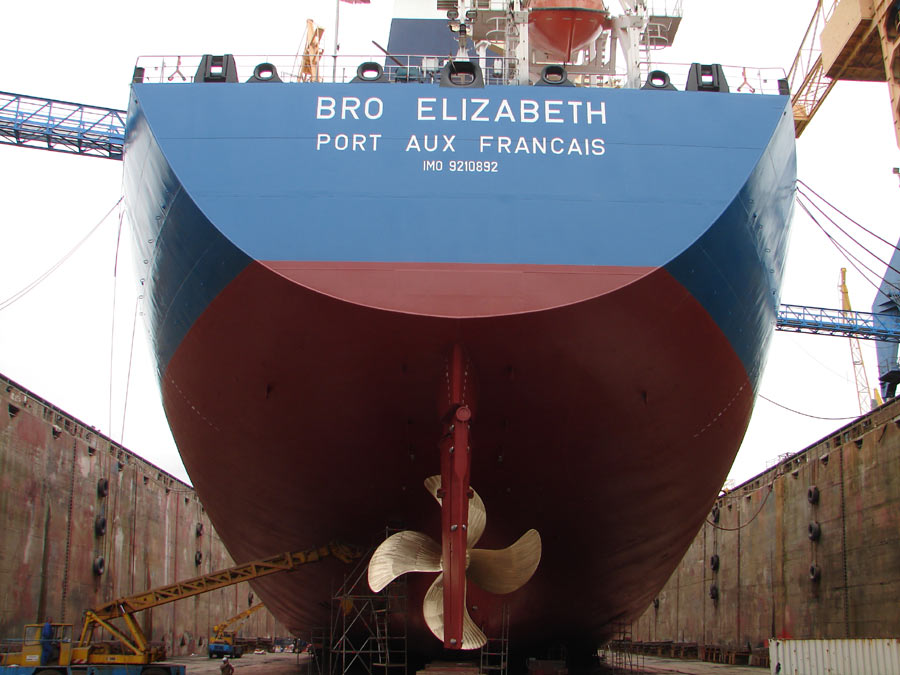
Vertical transom and stern of a modern cargo ship

A transom is the aft transverse surface of the hull of some boats and ships, forming the hull's stern. Adding both strength and width to the stern, a transom may be flat or curved; its angle may be vertical, raked aft (known as an overhung or "counter" stern), or raked forward (and "reversed", also known as retroussé). In small boats and yachts, a flat termination of the stern is typically above the waterline, but large commercial vessels often exhibit vertical transoms that dip slightly beneath the water.

On smaller boats (such as dinghies) transoms may support a rudder, outboard motor, or other accessory. On some yachts the transom may include a hinged swim-platform, and a lazarette for deck items and leisure toys.

== Etymology ==
The term was used as far back as Middle English in the 1300s, having come from Latin transversus (transverse) via Old French traversain (set crosswise).

== Design ==
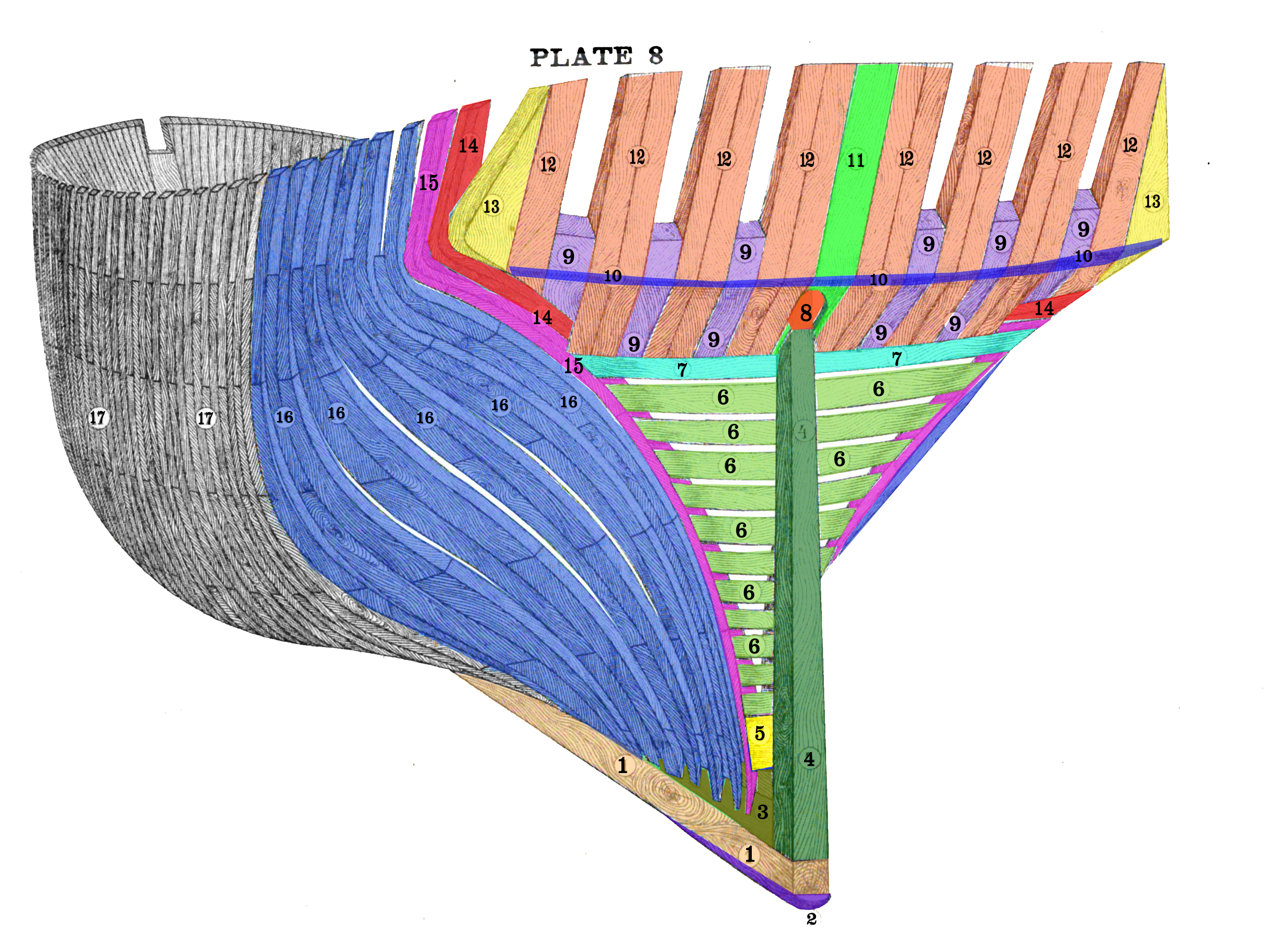
Traditional timber construction with horizontal transom members in pale yellow-green (6) and turquoise (7)

== Gallery ==
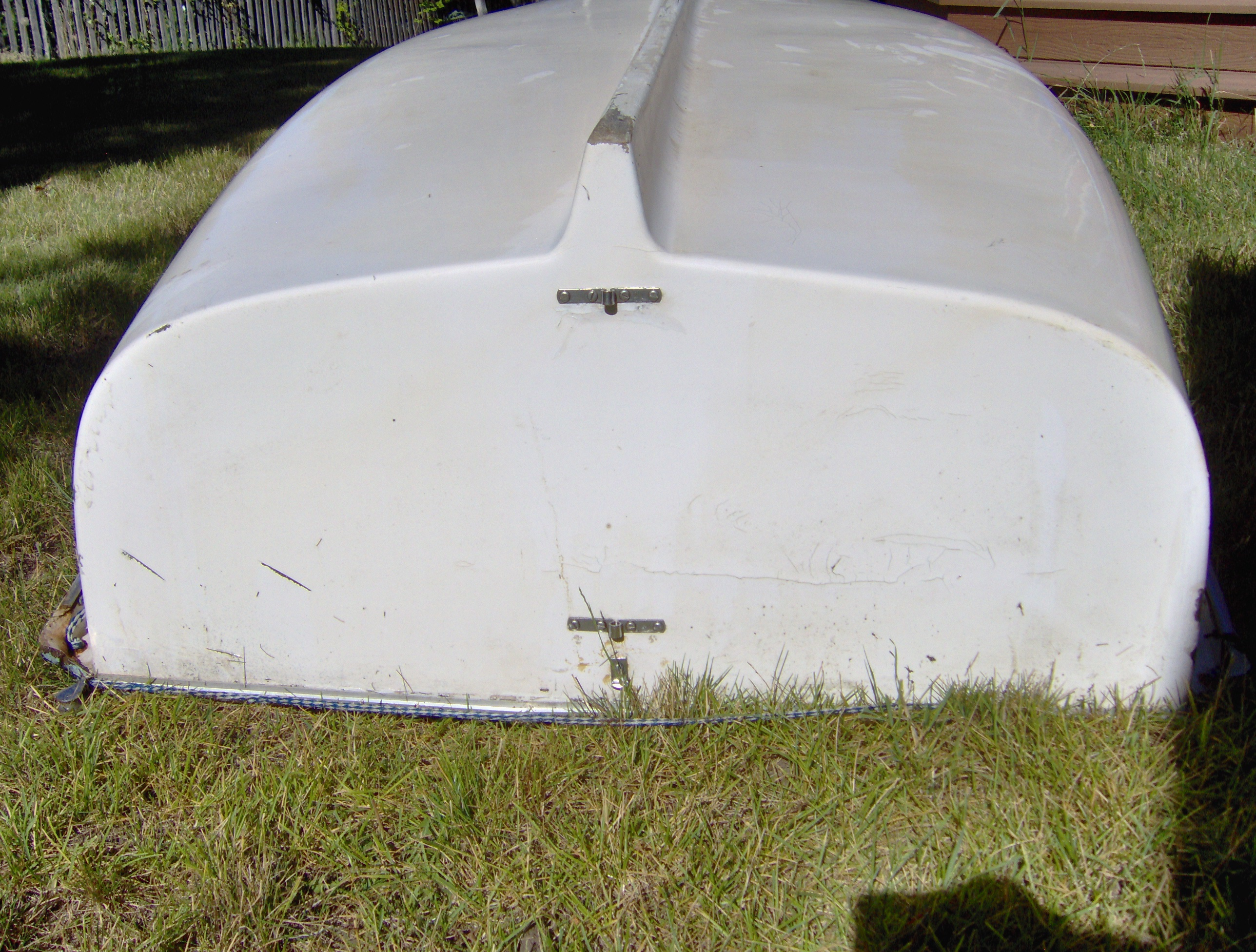
Flat transom on a dinghy with rudder mounting points

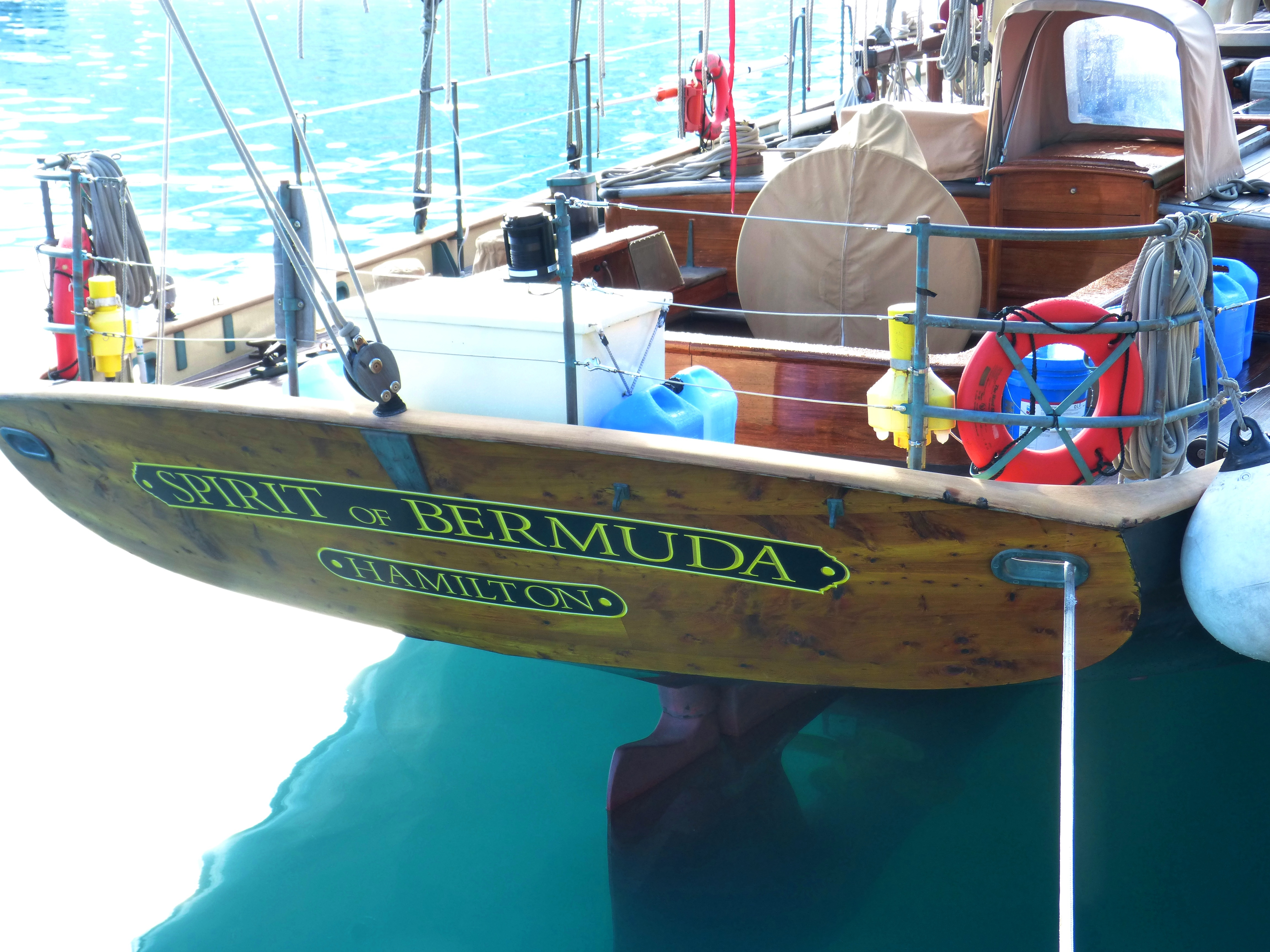
The transom of the Spirit of Bermuda, made of Bermuda cedar

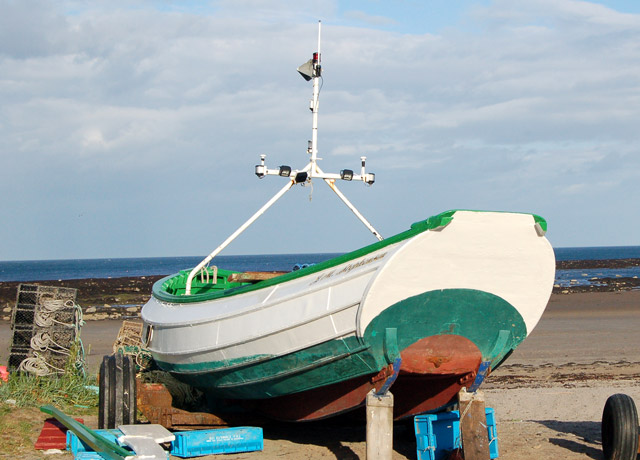
Raked transom with rudder mounting points

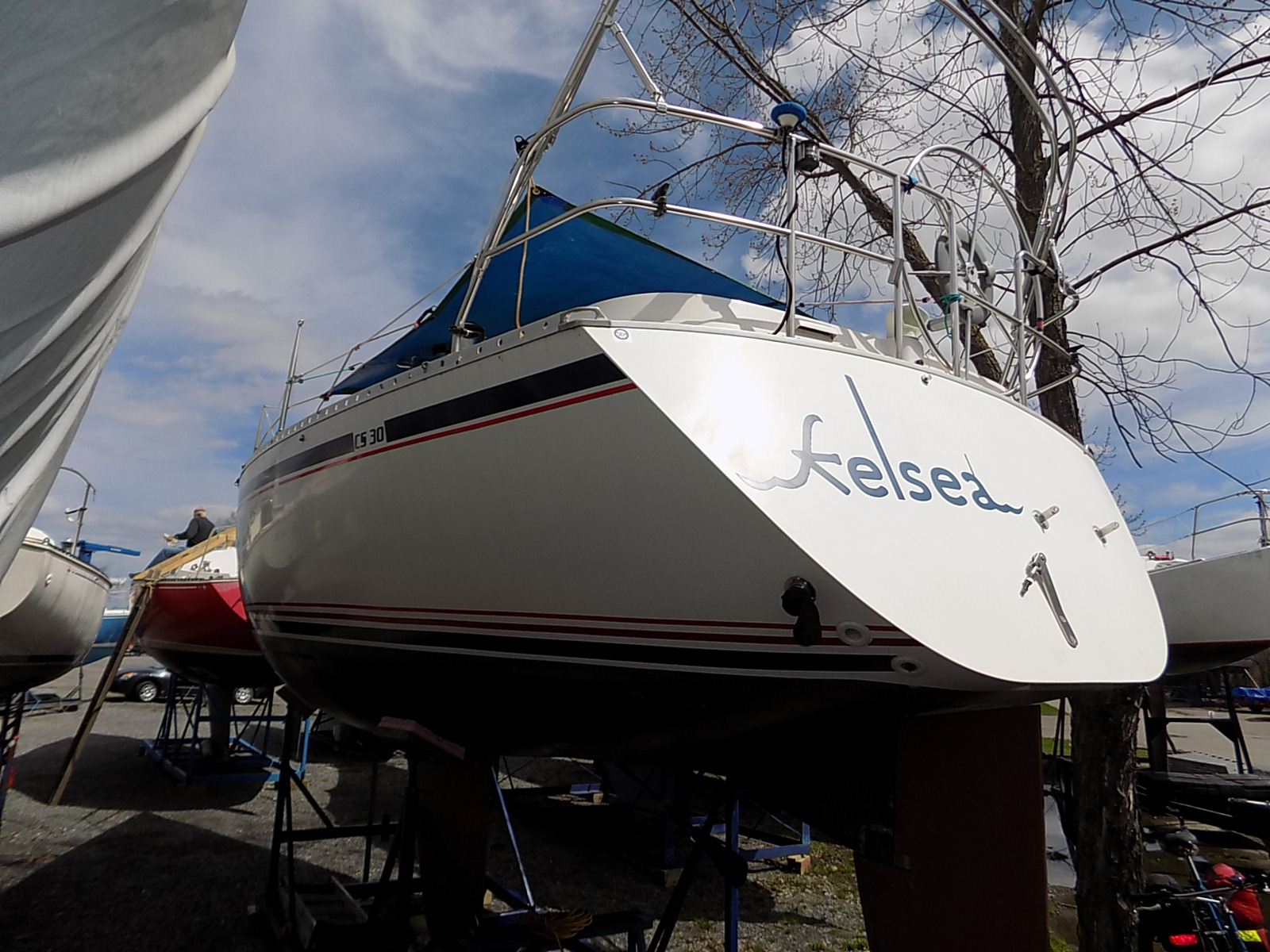
Reverse transom with rudder mounted under the hull

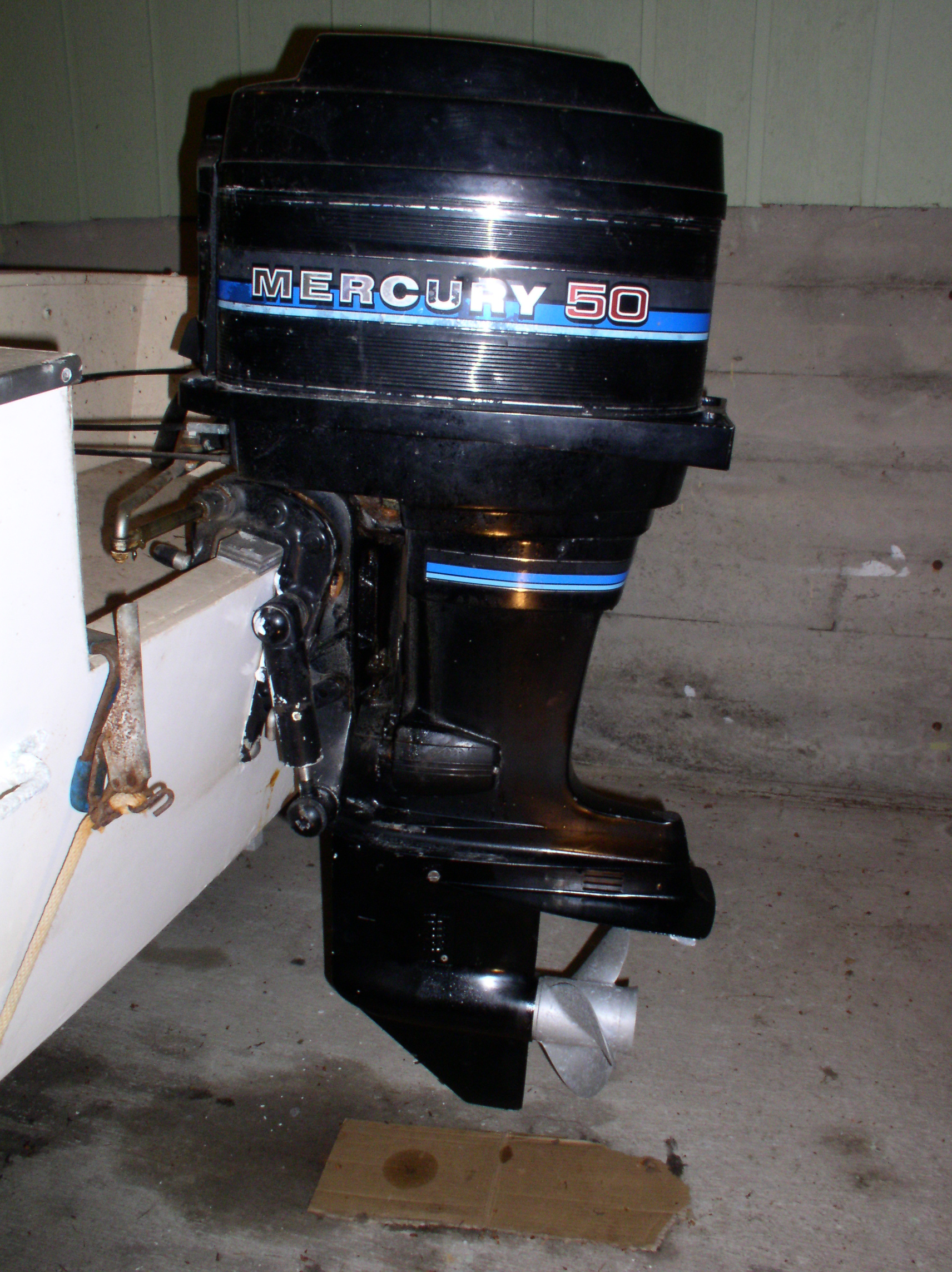
Transom-mounted outboard motor

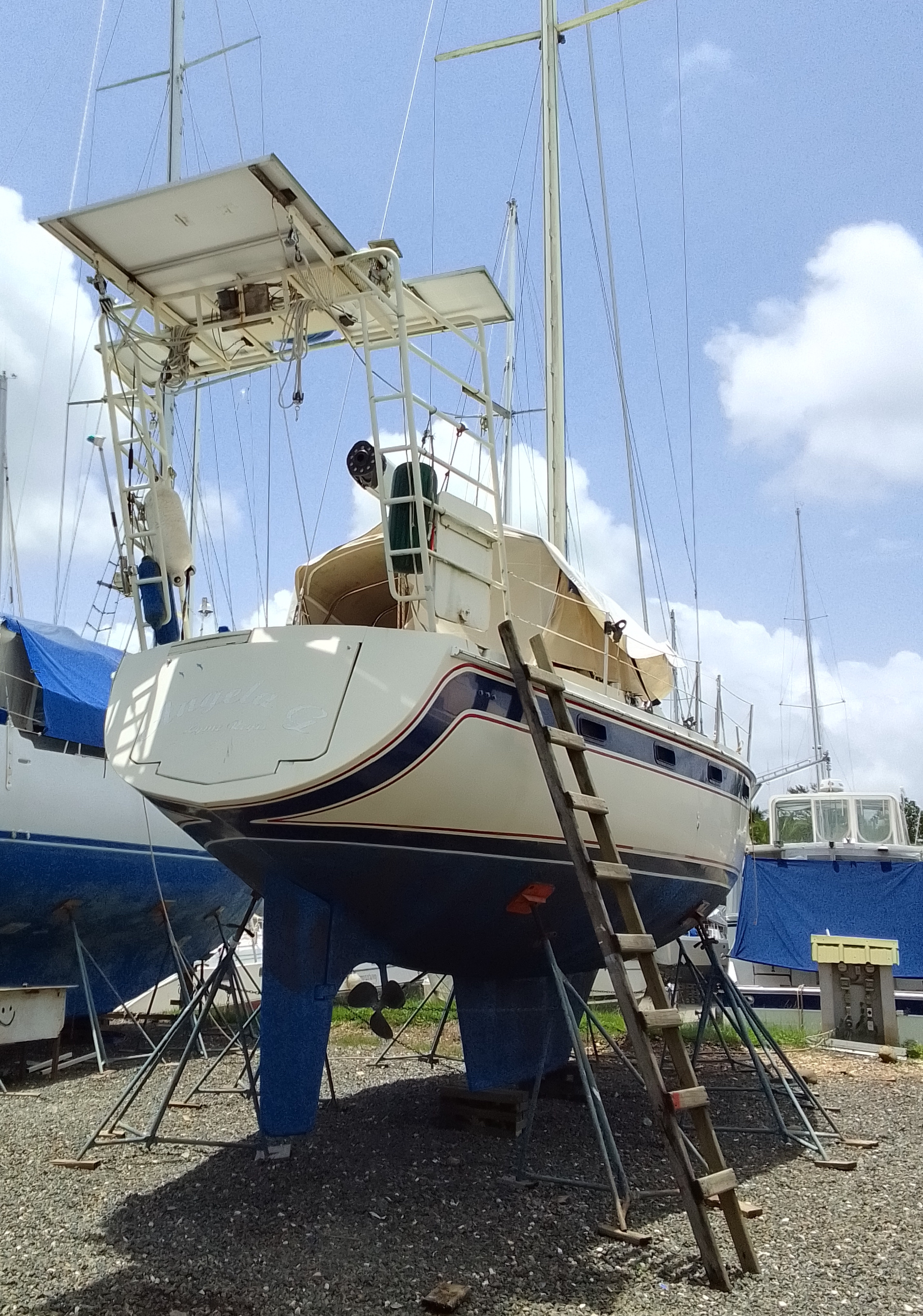
An Irwin 44 sloop with a fold-down reverse transom

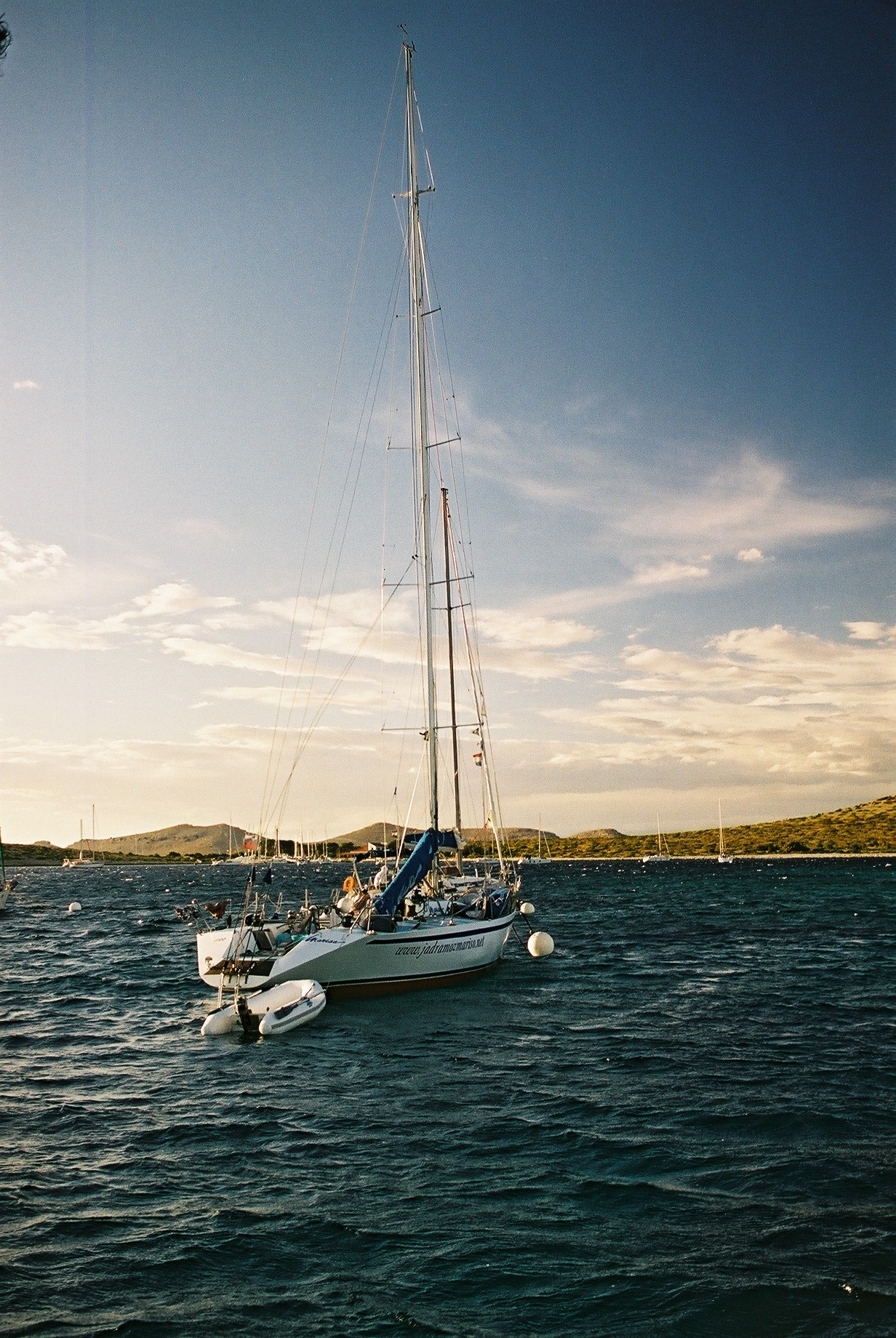
Reverse transom with integral access platform
