= Pearson Renegade =

Sloop rigged sailboat by Pearson Yachts of Bristol

Boat
- Draft: 4 ft 3 in (130 cm)

Hull
- LOA: 27 ft 2 in (828 cm)
- LWL: 21"
- Beam: 8 ft 7 in (262 cm)

The Pearson Renegade is a 27' sloop rigged sailboat produced by Pearson Yachts of Bristol, RI from 1966 to 1969, with the first boats being sold in 1967. Designed by William Shaw, about 175 of the boats were built. They were Pearson's first split underbody boat and were designed to Cruising Club of America racing rules. They are also one of the first American "racer-cruiser" style boats that combine the comforts of a cruising boat with the advantage of a modified full keel with a spade rudder (see photo), like that of the Bill Lapworth Cal 40 designs that revolutionized ocean racing in the mid-late 1960s. The keel allows the boat to track well and have good stability. The deep balanced rudder allows a high degree of maneuverability, and the turning radius of the boat is very tight. It continues to be a sought after boat because of their stout construction and kindly sailing ability.

Early versions had a traditional two settee salon, while boats produced in 1968 and after feature a more modern galley starboard and settee to port. Both have a spacious V-berth over six feet long and were available with either a 30-HP Universal Atomic 4 gas inboard or an outboard well. The cockpit can comfortably accommodate 4-6 people, and the boat can sleep 4 adults below decks. Standard steering on the boat was with a tiller, but many owners have installed after-market wheel steering. Other typical upgrades would include a roller furling headstay to replace the original forestay, and upgraded instrumentation such as depth, speed, and wind gauges, which did not come standard on the original boats. For more information on upgrades and projects on the Pearson Renegade, visit the Renegade homepage via the link at the bottom of the page.

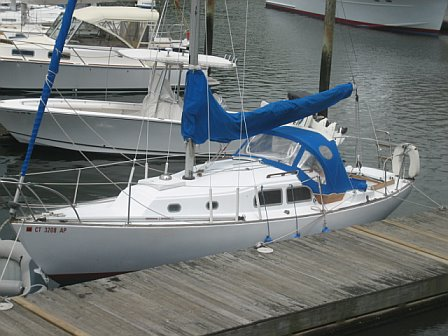
A 1967 Pearson Renegade

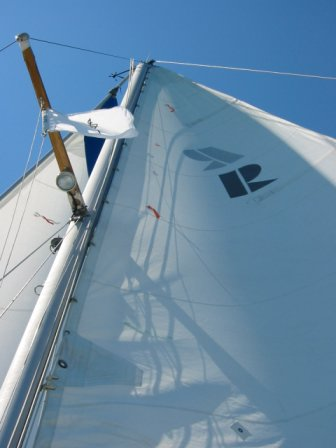
The Renegade Emblem

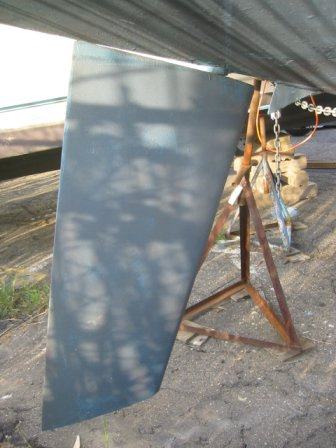
The Renegade's spade rudder, allowing for quicker maneuvering than traditional keel rudders

== Specifications ==
LOA	27'2" (27' sloop)
LWL	21"
Beam	8'7"
Draft	4'3"
Displacement	6500 lbs
Ballast	2100 lbs (Internal Lead)
Head Room	5' 10''
Berths	4
Water Capacity	20 gals.
Fuel Capacity	13 gals.
CCA Rating	22.6 app.
Rigging	Masthead sloop
Sails
Main	174 ft^{2}
#1 Genoa (163%)	277 ft^{2}
#2 Genoa (153%)	240 ft^{2}
#3 Genoa (110%)	198 ft^{2}
Spinnaker	CCA Rules

== See also ==
- Alberg 35
- Albin Vega
- Pearson Ariel
- Pearson Electra
- Pearson Ensign
- Pearson Triton
- Pearson Vanguard
