= Pearson Wanderer =

Wanderer
Development
- Designer: William Shaw
- Year: 1965
- Name: Wanderer

Boat
- Draft: 3 ft 6 in (1.07 m) –6 ft 8 in (2.03 m)

Hull
- Type: Monohull
- Construction: GRP
- Hull weight: 9,800 lb (4,400 kg)
- LOA: 30 ft 3 in (9.22 m)
- LWL: 23 ft (7.0 m)
- Beam: 9 ft 4 in (2.84 m)

Hull appendages
- Keel: Fixed - 3,800 lb (1,700 kg)

Rig
- Rig type: Masthead Sloop

Sails
- Total sail area: 424 sq ft (39.4 m^{2})

The Pearson Wanderer is a sailboat designed by William Shaw and manufactured by Pearson Yachts (Grumman Allied Industries) between 1966 and 1971.

== Design ==
The Wanderer model is a shoal-draft keel sailboat with a centerboard designed for cruising. It is very similar to the smaller Tartan 27, also designed by William Shaw when he worked at Sparkman & Stephens. The Wanderer is similar to other Pearson boats of the era; for example, the Coaster, which has a full keel but is otherwise identical, and the Vanguard. There were approximately 177 Wanderers built. It is closely related to the Pearson Renegade, another Shaw design. Wanderers are considered good sea boats and one has competed in the Bermuda 1-2 race from Newport to Bermuda several times.

Use of the centerboard is optional at all points of sail, but to windward putting the centerboard down will improve the steering balance. With the centerboard up, the Wanderer is one of the shallowest-draft keel boats in its size range.

The Wanderer came in two different cabin configurations. One with the galley under the companionway and one with it on starboard side of the cabin. Both configurations came with a head and forward V-berth. The Wanderer also came with a Universal Atomic 4 gas engine.

== Construction ==
Because fiberglass was still relatively new as a boat building material, the hulls of these boats were fairly thick and are quite durable. As the hulls were built by hand, there is some variation in the construction, even within models. One example of this is the presence of "keel voids". Not all have similar voids, nor do they contain the same filler material.

== See also ==
- Alberg 35
- Albin Vega
