= Alerion (disambiguation) =

Alerion is a term for a heraldic bird.

Alerion may also refer to:

- Alerion Aviation, an American private jet charter company
- Alerion Express 19, an American trailerable sailboat design
- Alerion Express 28, an American sailboat design
- Riout 102T Alérion, a 1937 flapping-wing aircraft
- "Alerion", a song by Asking Alexandria from the 2009 album Stand Up and Scream

== See also ==
- Aileron, a flight control surface
