= Pearson 24 =

1960s US recreational keelboat

Development
- Designer: William Shaw
- Location: United States
- Year: 1967
- Builder: Pearson Yachts
- Role: Cruiser

Boat
- Displacement: 4,300 lb (1,950 kg)
- Draft: 4.00 ft (1.22 m)

Hull
- Type: monohull
- Construction: fiberglass
- LOA: 23.50 ft (7.16 m)
- LWL: 18.50 ft (5.64 m)
- Beam: 8.00 ft (2.44 m)
- Engine: outboard motor

Hull appendages
- Keel: modified long keel
- Ballast: 1,800 lb (816 kg)
- Rudder: keel-mounted rudder

Rig
- Rig type: Bermuda rig
- I foretriangle height: 30.33 ft (9.24 m)
- J foretriangle base: 9.16 ft (2.79 m)
- P mainsail luff: 25.75 ft (7.85 m)
- E mainsail foot: 11.16 ft (3.40 m)

Sails
- Sailplan: masthead sloop
- Mainsail area: 143.69 sq ft (13.349 m^{2})
- Jib/genoa area: 138.91 sq ft (12.905 m^{2})
- Total sail area: 282.60 sq ft (26.254 m^{2})

Racing
- PHRF: 252

The Pearson 24 is a recreational keelboat built by Pearson Yachts in the United States from 1967 until 1969.

== Design ==
The design is a development of the Lark 24.

The Pearson 24 is a recreational keelboat, built predominantly of fiberglass, with wood trim. It has a masthead sloop rig; a spooned, raked stem; a raised counter, angled transom, a keel-mounted rudder controlled by a tiller and a fixed modified long keel, with a cutaway forefoot. It displaces 4,300 lb (1,950 kg) and carries 1,800 lb (816 kg) of ballast.

The boat has a draft of 4.00 ft (1.22 m) with the standard keel.

The boat is normally fitted with a small 4 to 6 hp (3 to 4 kW) outboard motor for docking and maneuvering.

The design has sleeping accommodation for four people, with a double "V"-berth in the bow cabin and two straight settees in the main cabin. The galley is located on both sides just aft of the bow cabin. The galley is equipped with sink to port and an optional two-burner stove to starboard. The optional head is located centered under the bow cabin "V"-berth. Cabin headroom is 57 in (145 cm).

The design has a PHRF racing average handicap of 252 and a hull speed of 5.8 kn (10.7 km/h).

== Reception ==
In a 2010 review Steve Henkel wrote, "It is interesting to compare this boat with her near sister-ship, the Pearson Lark 24 ... The Lark was phased out in 1968, the year that the Pearson 24 was introduced. The two boats were more similar than an initial glance might indicate. It looks to us as if the Pearson 24 design uses the same basic hull, but with six inches of the stern counter chopped off, and a new deck mold more in line with what the conservative customer base was looking for in the late 1960s. The traditional cabin house gives a 4-inch boost in headroom, but the Space Index is almost 20 percent lower than the Lark's. The rather unconventional accommodations plan on the Lark was totally revamped on the P24 (to open up more space in the middle of the cabin by moving the head forward into the V-berth area (requiring elimination of the Lark’s hinged seatback facing aft), and eliminating the Lark’s elaborate galley storage area. The elegant deck-loading icebox on the Lark is gone, with 'provision for a portable ice chest' instead. The Pearson 24 was discontinued the year after she was introduced. We'd rather have kept the Lark. Best features: She's a good (but plain) cruising boat. Worst features: Her comp[arable]s are probably both faster in light air."
