= Pearson 23C =

1980s US recreational keelboat

Development
- Designer: William Shaw
- Location: United States
- Year: 1983
- No. built: 42
- Builder: Pearson Yachts
- Role: Cruiser
- Name: Pearson 23C

Boat
- Displacement: 3,000 lb (1,361 kg)
- Draft: 4.00 ft (1.22 m)

Hull
- Type: monohull
- Construction: fiberglass
- LOA: 23.00 ft (7.01 m)
- LWL: 20.00 ft (6.10 m)
- Beam: 8.00 ft (2.44 m)
- Engine: outboard motor

Hull appendages
- Keel: fin keel
- Ballast: 1,200 lb (544 kg)
- Rudder: transom-mounted rudder

Rig
- Rig type: cat rig
- P mainsail luff: 30.00 ft (9.14 m)
- E mainsail foot: 14.00 ft (4.27 m)

Sails
- Sailplan: catboat
- Mainsail area: 210.00 sq ft (19.510 m^{2})
- Total sail area: 210.00 sq ft (19.510 m^{2})

Racing
- PHRF: 240

The Pearson 23C is a sailboat that was first built in 1983. The Pearson 23C is a cat rigged development of the sloop-rigged Pearson 23. The design was built by Pearson Yachts in the United States from 1983 until 1985 with 42 boats completed, but it is now out of production.

== Design ==
The Pearson 23C is a recreational keelboat, built predominantly of fiberglass, with wood trim. It has a catboat rig with an unstayed, spun-tapered aluminum mast. The hull has a raked stem, a plumb transom, a transom-hung rudder controlled by a tiller and a fixed fin keel or optional keel and centerboard. It displaces 3,000 lb (1,361 kg) and carries 1,200 lb (544 kg) of ballast.

The keel-equipped version of the boat has a draft of 4.00 ft (1.22 m), while the centerboard-equipped version has a draft of 5.17 ft (1.58 m) with the centerboard extended and 2.33 ft (0.71 m) with it retracted, allowing operation in shallow water or ground transportation on a trailer.

The boat is normally fitted with a small 3 to 6 hp (2 to 4 kW) outboard motor for docking and maneuvering.

The design has sleeping accommodation for two people, with a double berth in the main cabin, made up from two straight settee berths, that can be joined athartships. The head is located in the bow. Cabin headroom is 56 in (142 cm).

The design has a PHRF racing average handicap of 240 and a hull speed of 6.0 kn (11.1 km/h).

== Reception ==
In a 2010 review Steve Henkel wrote, "this boat is one of Bill Shaw's few catboat designs. In a way is a daring flight of fancy for Shaw, who was generally quite conservative in his designs. Not much was at risk, however, the cat proved to not be very popular (which it wasn't; only 42 were built), since virtually the same molds and tooling were used to build the Pearson 23 sloop version ... Best features: Part of the idea for the cat rig was its innate simplicity: only one sail to trim, and the ability to tack without adjusting any lines. One owner says, 'It’s hard to imagine a better singlehander's boat.' Worst features: Some owners found the boom topping lift a nuisance to operate because of the pronounced roach in the mainsail, and replaced the lift with a rigid vang. The 7/8" sailtrack tends to stick; some owners have tried Battcars, others installed something called Strongtrack, which slides over the existing track."
