= Pearson 32 =

Sailboat class

Development
- Designer: William Shaw
- Year: 1979-1982
- No. built: 113
- Builder: Pearson Yachts
- Role: Cruiser-Racer

Boat
- Displacement: 9,400 lb (4,300 kg)
- Draft: 5.50 ft (1.68 m)

Hull
- Type: monohull
- Construction: fiberglass
- LOA: 31.75 ft (9.68 m)
- LWL: 25.00 ft (7.62 m)
- Beam: 10.50 ft (3.20 m)

Hull appendages
- Keel: Fin keel
- Ballast: 3,800 lb (1,700 kg)
- Rudder: Internally-mounted spade rudder

Rig
- Rig type: Bermuda rig
- I foretriangle height: 40.86 ft (12.45 m)
- J foretriangle base: 13.00 ft (3.96 m)
- P mainsail luff: 35.36 ft (10.78 m)
- E mainsail foot: 11.79 ft (3.59 m)

Sails
- Sailplan: masthead sloop
- Total sail area: 474.71 sq ft (44.102 m^{2})

The Pearson 32 is a 31.75-foot American sailboat designed by William Shaw and produced by Pearson Yachts between 1979 and 1982. It was developed as a versatile vessel, balancing the needs of club racing enthusiasts and coastal cruising.

== Design and development ==
The Pearson 32 was introduced as a successor to earlier models like the Pearson Triton. Designer William Shaw aimed to combine racing performance with cruising comfort. The boat features a fin keel and spade rudder, which improve maneuverability and upwind performance compared to the full-keel designs of earlier Pearson models. The design was aimed at couples, small families, or solo sailors looking for a boat capable of both casual cruising and competitive sailing.

The hull of the Pearson 32 features a relatively flat underbody and fine forward sections, contributing to its windward performance. The lead ballast fin keel and high-aspect-ratio spade rudder were engineered to provide stability and precise handling, allowing turn-on-a-dime maneuverability. The boat also boasts a robust keel stub, designed to withstand the stresses of running aground, a common concern for coastal cruisers.

The above deck's layout was optimized for short-handed sailing and competitive racing. Features such as an Edson wheel, halyard controls at the mast, and a compact yet efficient cockpit with deep coamings demonstrate the attention to detail in balancing functionality with ergonomics. The interior followed this philosophy, offering warm teak finishes, a foldaway table to maximize space and a practical galley with options for modern upgrades like refrigeration. These features made the Pearson 32 an appealing choice for sailors looking for a dual-purpose vessel that met both racing and cruising needs.

== Specifications ==
- Length Overall (LOA): 31.75 ft (9.68 m)
- Length Waterline (LWL): 25.00 ft (7.62 m)
- Beam: 10.50 ft (3.20 m)
- Draft: 5.50 ft (1.68 m)
- Displacement: 9,400 lb (4,300 kg)
- Ballast: 3,800 lb (1,700 kg)
- Sail Area: 474.71 sq ft (44.102 m^{2})
- Engine: Universal diesel engine (18 hp)
- Fuel Capacity: 19 gallons
- Water Capacity: 38 gallons

== Accommodations ==
The interior layout of the Pearson 32 was designed for comfort and practicality:

- Sleeping: Forward V-berth, two settee berths, and an optional quarter berth aft.
- Galley: Includes a two-burner stove, sink, and icebox, with space for modern upgrades such as refrigeration.
- Head: A compact but functional compartment with a marine toilet and sink.
- Headroom: 6 feet throughout the cabin.

== Performance ==
The Pearson 32 is renowned for its versatility and sailing performance:

- Handling: Easy to single-hand and responsive under sail.
- Stability: The fin keel and form stability reduce heeling tendencies, enhancing comfort in various wind conditions.
- Speed: Optimized for light to moderate winds, making it competitive for club racing while maintaining cruising capabilities.

== Production and legacy ==
The Pearson 32 was built by Pearson Yachts, one of the most prominent yacht manufacturers in the United States, from 1979 to 1982. During this period, 113 units were produced, a modest number compared to some of Pearson's earlier models. Despite this, the Pearson 32 left a lasting impact on the sailing community due to its quality construction and versatility. The boat became a favorite among sailors in regions like New England, Long Island Sound, and the Chesapeake Bay, where its design was well-suited to light to moderate wind conditions.

As one of the later designs in Pearson's lineup under Grumman ownership, the Pearson 32 reflected advancements in fiberglass construction and yacht design technology. While it was succeeded by newer models such as the Pearson 303, the Pearson 32 remains highly regarded for its balance of speed, comfort, and ease of use.

Today, the Pearson 32 enjoys a dedicated following among sailing enthusiasts and restoration hobbyists. Many owners praise its durability and timeless design, with several boats still actively raced and used for cruising. Online forums and owners' associations provide resources for maintenance, upgrades, and community events, helping preserve the legacy of the Pearson 32 decades after production ceased.

== See also ==
- Pearson Yachts
- William Shaw (yacht designer)
- List of sailing boat types
