= Pearson 30 =

Sailboat class

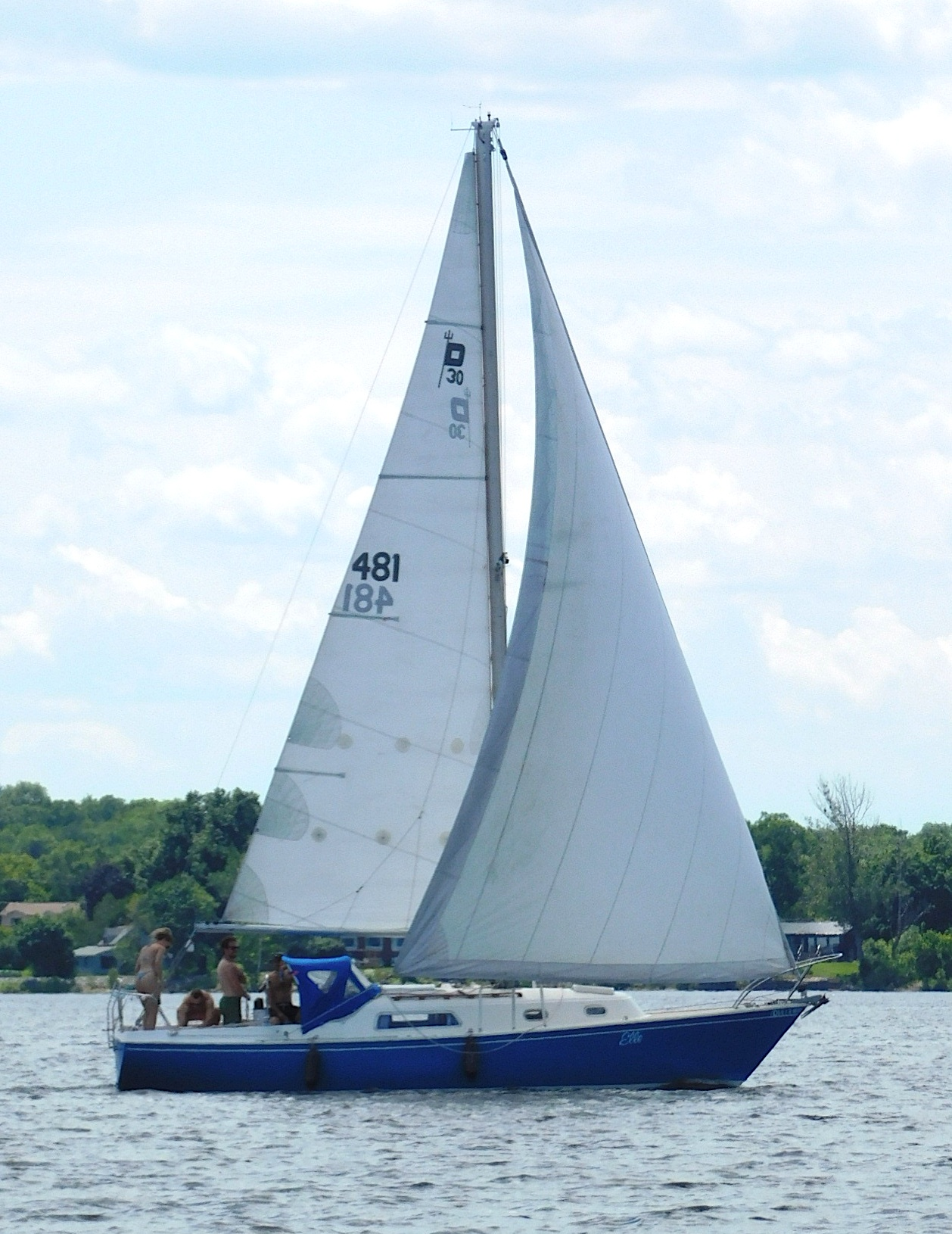

Development
- Designer: William Shaw
- Location: United States
- Year: 1971
- No. built: more than 1,185
- Builder: Pearson Yachts
- Role: Cruiser
- Name: Pearson 30

Boat
- Displacement: 8,320 lb (3,774 kg)
- Draft: 5.00 ft (1.52 m)

Hull
- Type: monohull
- Construction: fiberglass
- LOA: 29.79 ft (9.08 m)
- LWL: 25.00 ft (7.62 m)
- Beam: 9.50 ft (2.90 m)
- Engine: Universal Atomic 4 30 hp (22 kW) gasoline engine

Hull appendages
- Keel: fin keel
- Ballast: 3,560 lb (1,615 kg)
- Rudder: internally-mounted spade-type rudder

Rig
- Rig type: Bermuda rig
- I foretriangle height: 39.00 ft (11.89 m)
- J foretriangle base: 12.67 ft (3.86 m)
- P mainsail luff: 33.50 ft (10.21 m)
- E mainsail foot: 11.83 ft (3.61 m)

Sails
- Sailplan: masthead sloop
- Mainsail area: 198.15 sq ft (18.409 m^{2})
- Jib/genoa area: 247.07 sq ft (22.954 m^{2})
- Total sail area: 445.22 sq ft (41.362 m^{2})

The Pearson 30 is an American sailboat that was designed by William Shaw as a cruiser and first built in 1971.

The design was replaced in the company product line by the Pearson 303, which was also a Shaw design.

== Production ==
The design was built by Pearson Yachts in the United States, from 1971 until 1981, with 1,185 boats completed by 1 January 1980, but it is now out of production. The design was one of Pearson's most commercially successful boats.

== Design ==
The Pearson 30 is a recreational keelboat, built predominantly of fiberglass, with a balsa-cored deck and wood trim. The hull was made from a hand lay up in a one-piece mold. It has a masthead sloop rig, a raked stem, a plumb transom, an internally mounted spade-type rudder controlled by a tiller and a fixed fin keel. Wheel steering was a factory option. It displaces 8,320 lb (3,774 kg) and carries 3,560 lb (1,615 kg) of lead ballast.

The boat has a draft of 5.00 ft (1.52 m) with the standard keel.

Early production versions had a Palmer 22 hp (16 kW) inboard engine, while later ones came with a 30 hp (22 kW) Universal Atomic 4 gasoline engine and finally an Atomic two cylinder diesel engine, for docking and maneuvering. The fuel tank holds 20 U.S. gallons (76 L; 17 imp gal) and the fresh water tank has a capacity of 22 U.S. gallons (83 L; 18 imp gal).

The design has sleeping accommodation for six people, with a double "V"-berth in the bow cabin, a straight settee berth and a dinette table that converts to a double berth in the main cabin and an aft quarter berth on the port side. The galley is located on the starboard side just forward of the companionway ladder. The galley is L-shaped and is equipped with a two-burner stove, an ice box and a double sink. The head is located just aft of the bow cabin.

The design has a hull speed of 6.7 kn (12.4 km/h).

== Operational history ==
The boat's designer, William Shaw owned a Pearson 30 as his own personal boat for many years.

Even though it was not designed as a racer, the boat has had success on the racing circuit, including International Offshore Rule, PHRF, MORC and also one-design.

In a 2000 used boat review Darrell Nicholson wrote in Practical Sailor, "the Pearson 30 is an active sailor’s boat. We find it responsive, and a pleasure to sail. It is also tender, and very sensitive to the proper sail combination. All owners responding consider the boat to be somewhat 'tippy.' The P30 does, in fact, put the rail under quite easily." He concluded, "the Pearson 30 was an industry success story. The boat is fast and responsive. Finish quality is above average. The interior is comfortable and reasonably roomy within the limitations inherent in a 30-footer. Many of the minor design problems can be corrected by the imaginative and handy owner who enjoys tinkering."

== See also ==
- List of sailing boat types
