= Pearson Ariel =

Ariel
Development
- Designer: Carl Alberg
- Year: 1961
- Name: Ariel

Boat
- Draft: 3 ft 7 in (1.09 m)

Hull
- Type: Monohull
- Hull weight: 5,200 lb (2,400 kg) –5,600 lb (2,500 kg)
- LOA: 25 ft 7 in (7.80 m)
- LWL: 18 ft 6 in (5.64 m)
- Beam: 8 ft 0 in (2.44 m)

Hull appendages
- Keel: Fixed; 2,500 lb (1,100 kg) (Lead)

The Ariel was designed by naval architect Carl Alberg in 1961 for Pearson Yachts of Bristol, Rhode Island. The Ariel offered Pearson's early 1960s customers a midsized boat to fill the product line between the very successful Pearson Triton and the smaller Pearson Ensign/Electra. The Ariel shares many of the amenities of the larger Triton including standing headroom (5'10"), berths for four, sink, ice box, freshwater tank and an enclosed head. Other factory options included spinnaker gear and the choice of auxiliary power (Universal Atomic 4 inboard or an outboard in a well).

The Ariel and a later daysailing version, the Commander share a common hull and rig (the Commander has a smaller, more spartan cabin to allow for a very spacious cockpit). Of the more than 50 boat designs Carl Alberg produced after leaving the John G. Alden firm to design on his own, Alberg chose the Commander as his personal boat (Hull #302). This boat was named "ALMA" in honor of his wife and for many of his later years was sailed out of Marblehead, Ma.

Although the Ariel was produced from 1962 to 1967 (for a total of 440 boats), the majority remain in service today. While many Ariels and Commanders are used for casual daysailing, an active one design racing community still operates in San Francisco. Several ocean crossings have been made by these boats including transpacific crossings and some Newport-Bermuda runs.

== See also ==
- Alberg 35
- Albin Vega
