= Universal Atomic 4 =

Sailboat engine

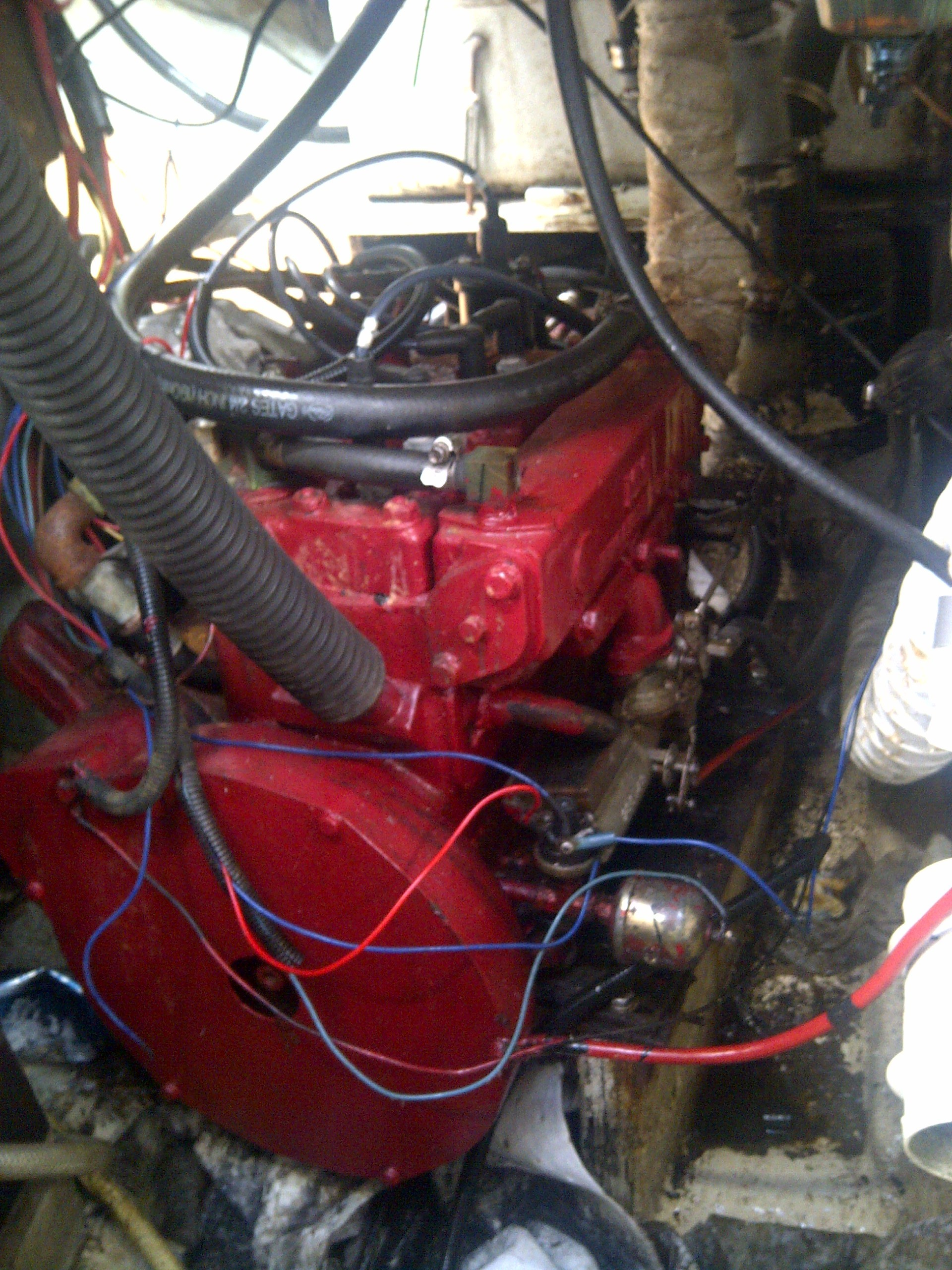
A Universal Atomic 4, installed in a C&C 29 Mark 1 sailboat.

The Universal Atomic 4 is a four-cylinder, gasoline engine produced by the Universal Motor Company between 1949 and 1984 for use as auxiliary power on sailboats. Both 18 horsepower (13 kW) and 30 horsepower (22 kW) versions of the engine were produced. Over 40,000 of the engines were produced during that time, with an estimated 20,000 still in use today.

The Universal Atomic 4 was very popular in C&C, Whitby Boatworks, Northern, Catalina Yachts and Pearson Yachts sailboats, up through 1985. Starting in the early 1970s the brand Yanmar became very popular as an auxiliary power diesel engine for sailboats, in response Universal began offering a marinized version of a Kubota diesel (tractor) engine in 1976, which was popular with sailboat manufacturers, in particular Catalina. As Yanmar diesel engines continued to gain in popularity, the Universal Atomic Four gasoline engines continued to lose market share rapidly. By 1989 Yanmar had eclipsed Universal in the diesel auxiliary market with 45% market share to 42% for Universal.

== History and lineage ==
The Atomic 4 is descended from an earlier Universal Motor Company design called the Utility Four, which was used extensively in World War II by the United States Navy and allies to power lifeboats. The Utility Four was replaced by the Atomic 4 in 1947.

== Applications ==
- Alberg 30
- Blue Water 24
- Bristol 40
- C&C 27
- C&C 29
- C&C 30
- C&C 33
- C&C 34
- C&C 35
- C&C 38
- C&C 39
- Cal 28
- Cal 29
- Chaser 29
- Catalina 27
- Catalina 30
- Catalina 38
- Chance 32/28
- Columbia 30
- Columbia 33 Caribbean
- Columbia 34
- Columbia 34 Mark II CB
- Columbia 34 Mark II SD
- Corvette 31
- Ericson 27
- Ericson 29
- Ericson 30
- Ericson 32
- Ericson 35
- Frigate 36
- Grampian 30
- Hughes 38-1
- Hughes 38-2
- Hughes 38-3
- Invader 36
- Irwin 27
- Islander 36
- Javelin 38
- Morgan 24/25
- Morgan Out Island 28
- Morgan 34
- Newport 27
- Newport 30
- North Star 1500
- Pearson 28
- Pearson 30
- Pearson Ariel
- Pearson Renegade
- Pearson Triton
- Pearson Wanderer
- Pearson Vanguard
- Ranger 28
- Ranger 29
- Ranger 32
- Ranger 33
- Ranger 30
- Ranger 37
- Redline 41
- Seafarer 31 Mark I
- Seafarer 31 Mark II
- Seafarer 34
- Southern Cross 28
- Soverel 36
- Swiftsure 33
- Tartan 27
- Tartan 27 Yawl
- Tartan 27-2
- Tartan 30
- Tartan 34 C

== Specifications ==
Engine Type	Four Cylinder, Vertical, 4 Cycle, L-Head
Bore	2 9/16" x 3 1/8"
Displacement	64.46 Cubic Inches
Compression Ratio	6.3:1
Engine Rotation	Counter-clockwise from flywheel end
Firing Order	1-2-4-3 (no. 1 on flywheel end)
Reduction Gear Ratio	2.04:1 or direct 1:1 drive
Maximum Operating Angle	~15 degrees
Fuel	regular leaded gasoline (will function on unleaded fuel with precautions)
Lubrication Oil	SAE 30

@ RPM	600	1000	1500	2000	2500	3000	3500
Brake Horsepower:	5	7.3	11.9	16.2	20	25	30
