= Pearson Lark =

1960s US recreational keelboat

Development
- Designer: William Shaw
- Location: United States
- Year: 1966
- No. built: 67
- Builder: Pearson Yachts
- Role: Cruiser
- Name: Pearson Lark

Boat
- Displacement: 4,300 lb (1,950 kg)
- Draft: 4.00 ft (1.22 m)

Hull
- Type: monohull
- Construction: fiberglass
- LOA: 24.00 ft (7.32 m)
- LWL: 18.50 ft (5.64 m)
- Beam: 8.00 ft (2.44 m)
- Engine: outboard motor

Hull appendages
- Keel: modified long keel
- Ballast: 1,800 lb (816 kg)
- Rudder: keel-mounted rudder

Rig
- Rig type: Bermuda rig
- I foretriangle height: 29.25 ft (8.92 m)
- J foretriangle base: 9.50 ft (2.90 m)
- P mainsail luff: 25.75 ft (7.85 m)
- E mainsail foot: 11.16 ft (3.40 m)

Sails
- Sailplan: masthead sloop
- Mainsail area: 143.69 sq ft (13.349 m^{2})
- Jib/genoa area: 138.94 sq ft (12.908 m^{2})
- Total sail area: 282.62 sq ft (26.256 m^{2})

Racing
- PHRF: 246

The Pearson Lark, also called the Lark 24, is a recreational keelboat that was designed by William Shaw as a cruiser and first built in 1966.

The Lark design was developed into the Pearson 24 in 1967.

== Production ==
The design was built by Pearson Yachts in the United States between 1966 and 1968, with 67 boats completed, but it is now out of production.

== Design ==
The Lark is a recreational keelboat, built predominantly of fiberglass, with wood trim. It has a masthead sloop rig, a flush-deck; a raked stem; a raised counter, angled transom; a keel-mounted rudder controlled by a tiller and a fixed modified long keel with a cutaway forefoot. It displaces 4,300 lb (1,950 kg) and carries 1,800 lb (816 kg) of ballast.

The boat has a draft of 4.00 ft (1.22 m) with the standard keel and is normally fitted with a small 4 to 6 hp (3 to 4 kW) outboard motor for docking and maneuvering.

The design has sleeping accommodation for four people, with a double "V"-berth in the bow cabin and two quarter berths in aft of the main cabin. The galley located on the port side of the main cabin and is equipped with a two-burner under-counter stove and a sink. The head is located opposite the gallery, on the starboard side. Cabin headroom is 53 in (135 cm).

The design has a PHRF racing average handicap of 246 and a hull speed of 5.8 kn (10.7 km/h).

== Reception ==
In a 2010 review Steve Henkel wrote, "in 1985 I interviewed designer Bill Shaw, then executive vice president and chief designer for Pearson Yachts. He recalled the Lark being built 'during a period when flush-deck types of boats were sort of popular. On the West Coast, they were very successful, and of course, in a small boat a flush deck gives you a tremendous amount of volume... . I've always been partial to that type of design.' But, he said, 'they’re not as popular as I would like them to be. ... The buyer likes change ... but not radical ideas.' The design was dropped after three or four years of low-volume production. Note that when he was with S&S Sparkman & Stephens, Shaw also did most of the design work on the racing-oriented Dolphin 24, a comp of the Lark, which was later produced by several builders. Best features: Just as designer Shaw said, on the Lark there's plenty of space below ... Worst features: Compared with her comp[etitor]s, the cruising oriented Lark has the highest PHRF rating, and the lowest Motion Index. You pays yer money and you takes yer choice."
