= Pearson 26 =

1970s U.S. recreational keelboat

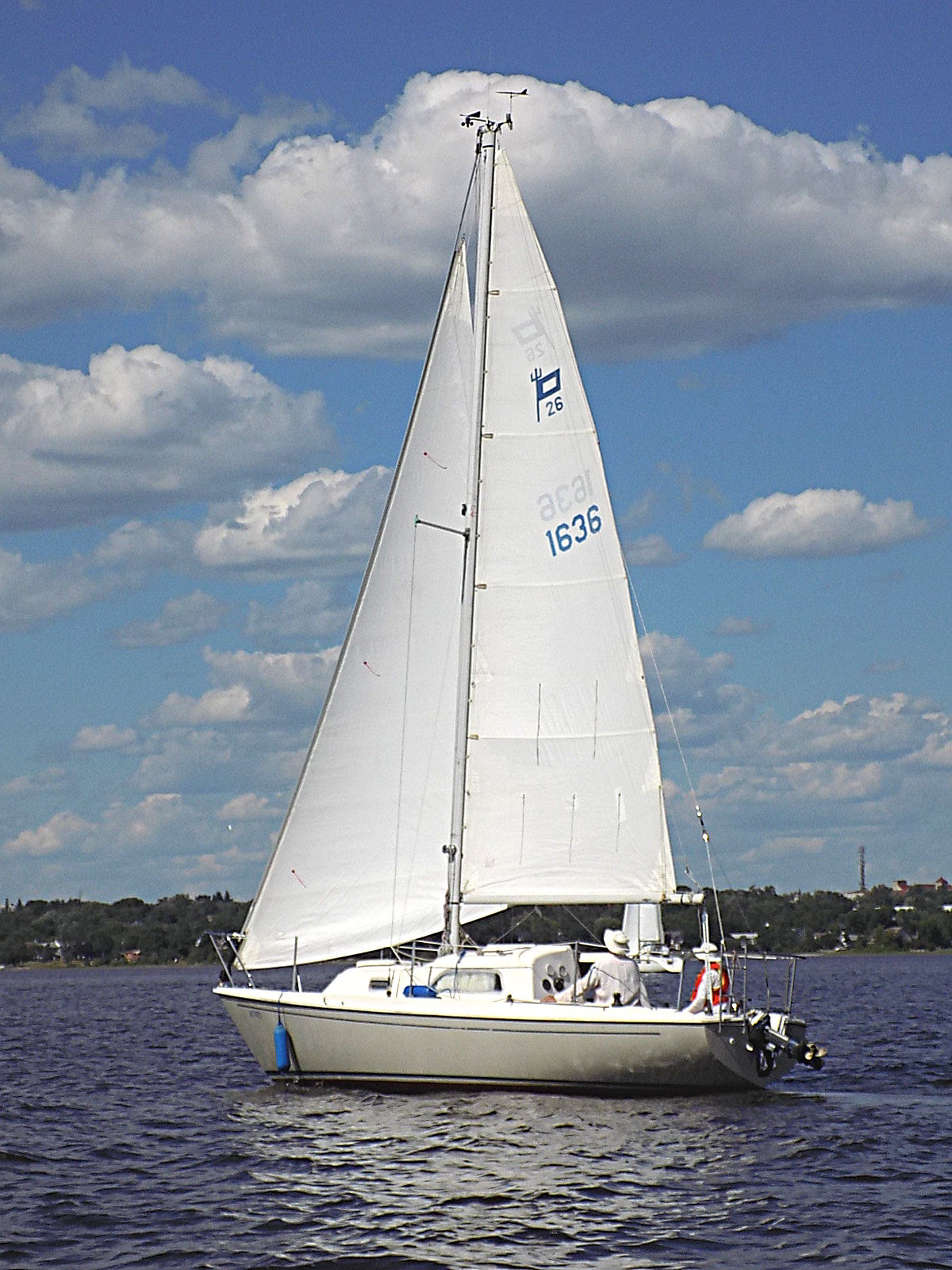

Development
- Designer: William Shaw
- Location: United States
- Year: 1970
- No. built: 1,750
- Builder: Pearson Yachts
- Name: Pearson 26

Boat
- Displacement: 5,400 lb (2,449 kg)
- Draft: 4.00 ft (1.22 m)

Hull
- Type: Monohull
- Construction: Fiberglass
- LOA: 26.17 ft (7.98 m)
- LWL: 21.67 ft (6.61 m)
- Beam: 8.67 ft (2.64 m)
- Engine: Outboard motor

Hull appendages
- Keel: swept fin keel
- Ballast: 2,200 lb (998 kg)
- Rudder: internally-mounted spade-type rudder

Rig
- Rig type: Bermuda rig
- I foretriangle height: 31.50 ft (9.60 m)
- J foretriangle base: 11.70 ft (3.57 m)
- P mainsail luff: 27.50 ft (8.38 m) (the exact P dimension is disputed)
- E mainsail foot: 10.00 ft (3.05 m)

Sails
- Sailplan: Masthead sloop
- Mainsail area: 137.50 sq ft (12.774 m^{2})
- Jib/genoa area: 184.28 sq ft (17.120 m^{2})
- Total sail area: 321.78 sq ft (29.894 m^{2})

Racing
- PHRF: 210 (average)

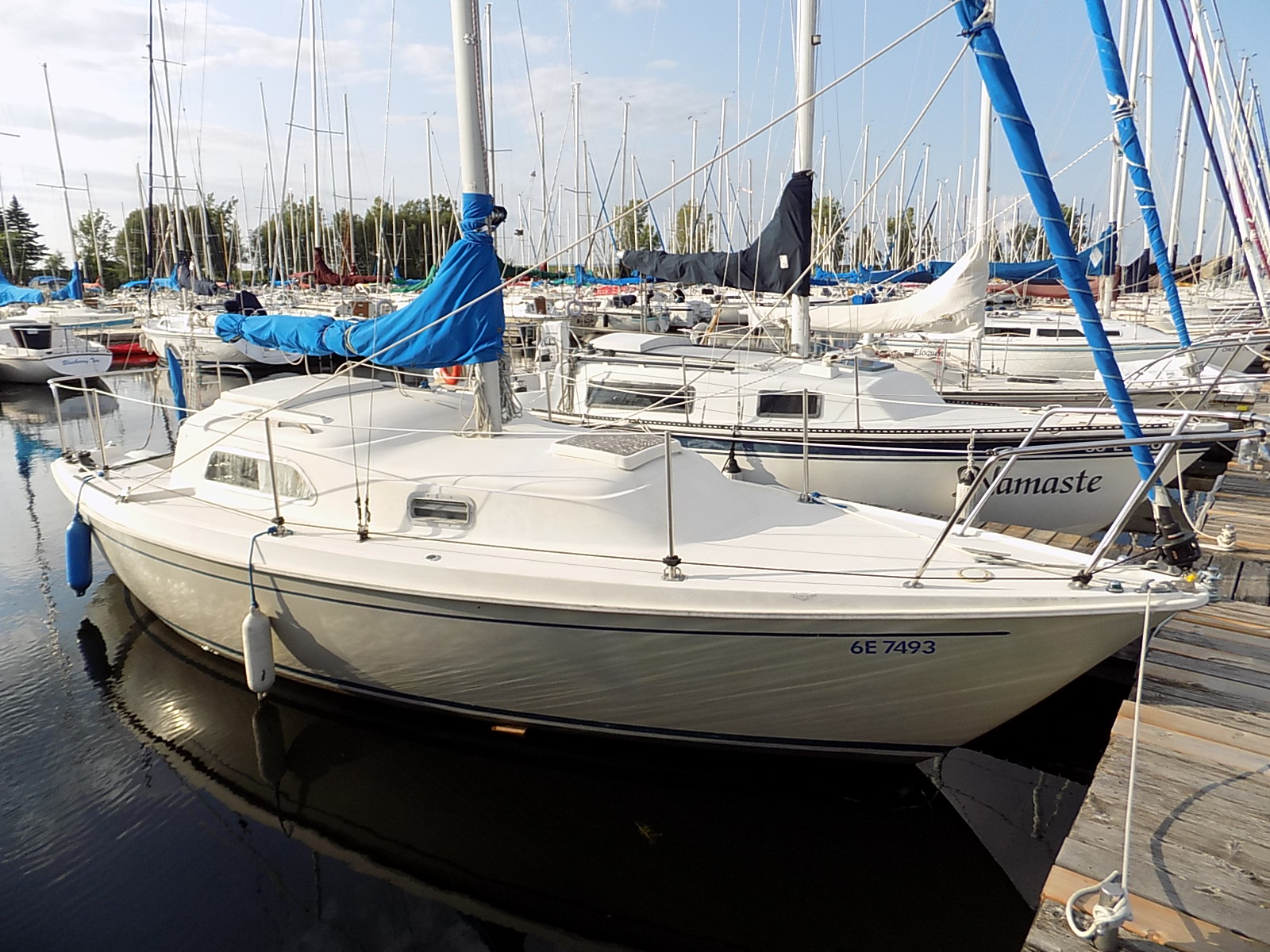
Pearson 26

The Pearson 26 is a recreational keelboat built by Pearson Yachts in the United States starting in 1970 and ending in 1983. A total of 1,750 of the base design were built, plus 300 of the Daysailor/Weekender and One-Design variants, for a total of 2,050.

The fiberglass hull has balsa-cored decks, a vertical transom, an internally-mounted spade-type rudder controlled by a tiller and a fixed swept fin keel. Hull speed is 6.24 kn (11.56 km/h). There is a transom for a small outboard motor. The outboard's fuel tank is mounted in a dedicated locker.

The cabin has five berths and four fixed portlights. The galley is on both sides of the cabin. A small ice chest is under the companionway ladder. Compartments for a head and hanging locker are between the two cabins. Cabin headroom is 5 ft 8 in.

All models have a masthead sloop rig, with an adjustable backstay. The mainsheet attaches to the end of the boom. The mast is deck stepped. The roomy self-bailing cockpit has a low bridgedeck.

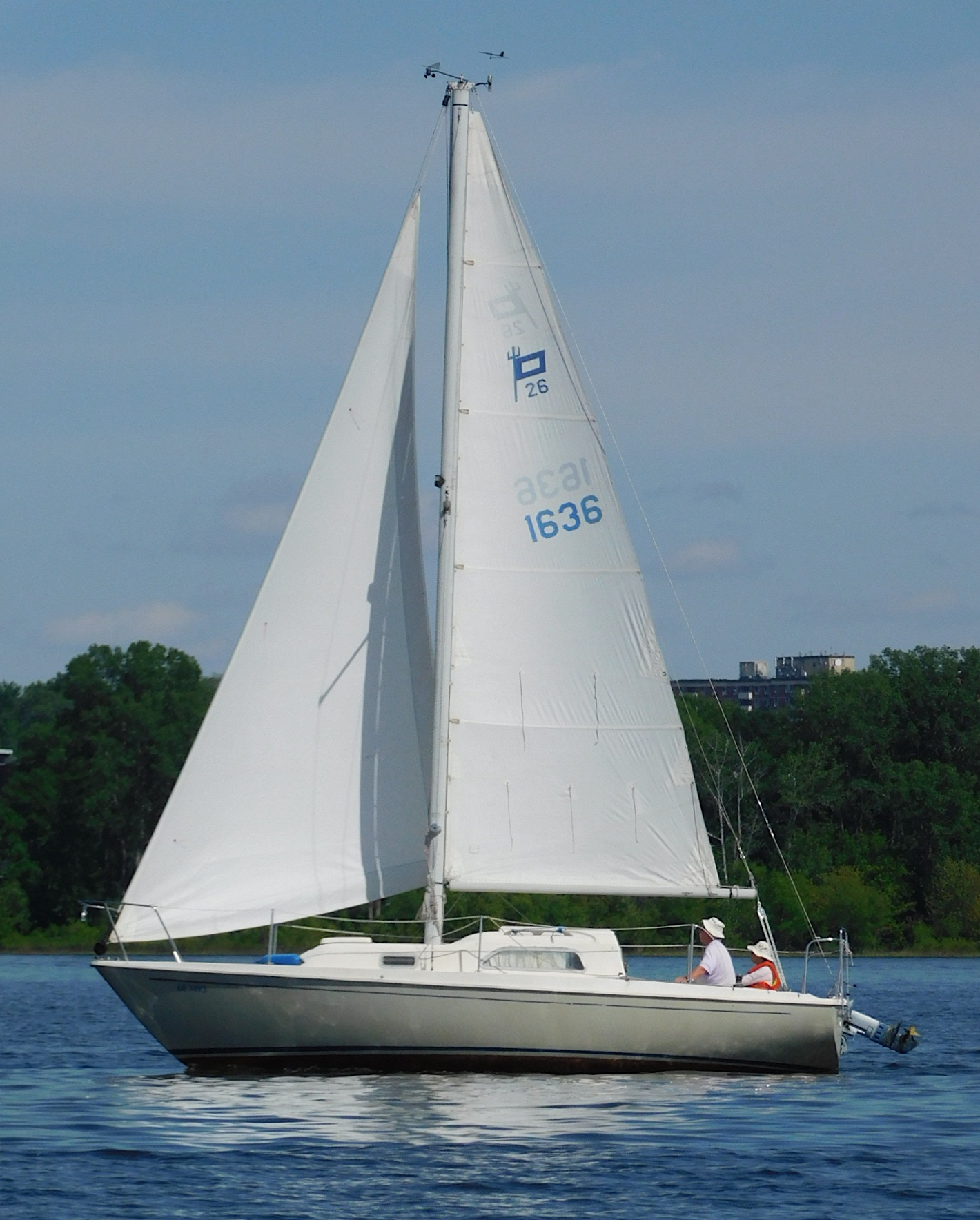
Pearson 26

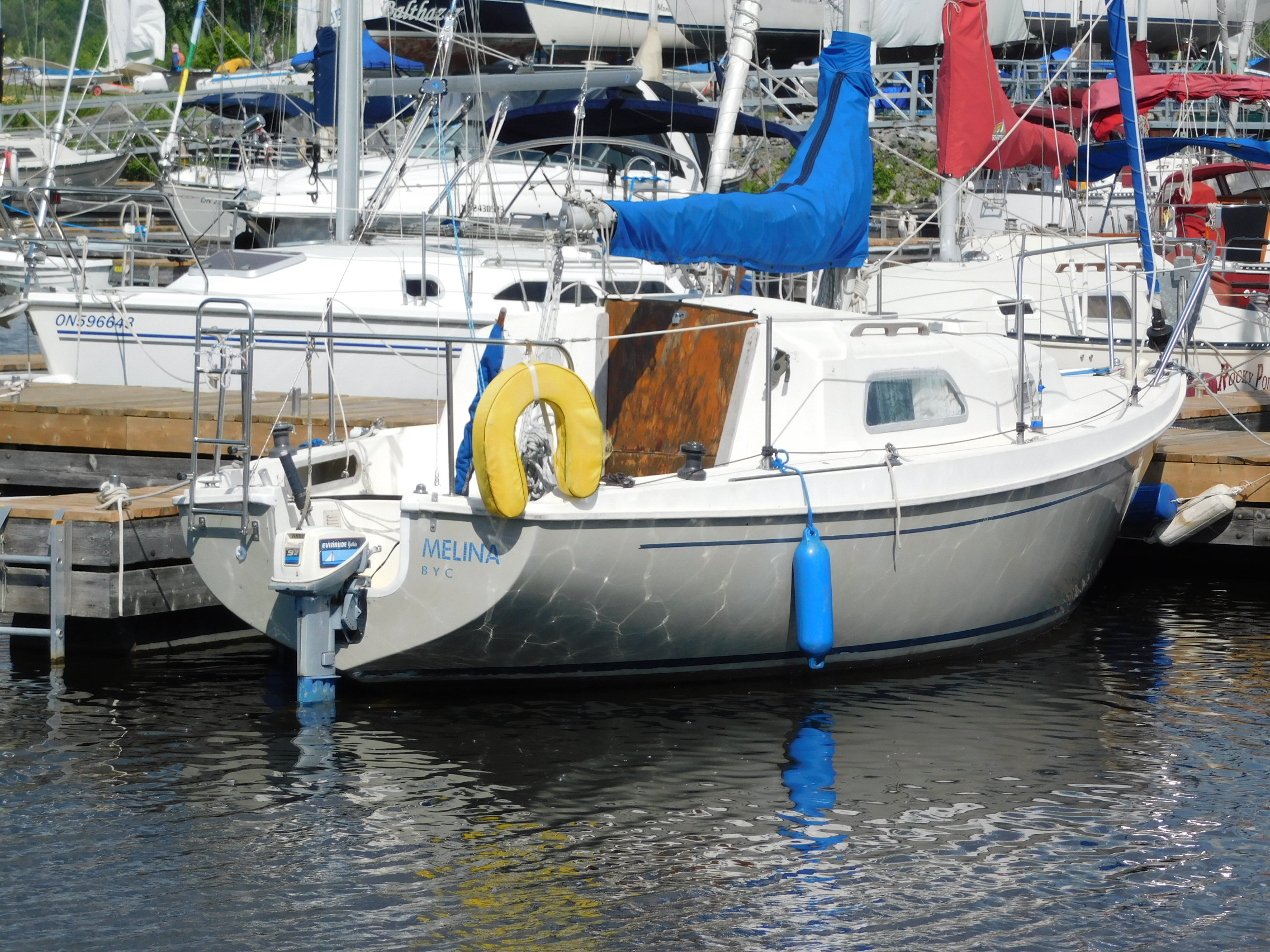
Pearson 26 showing the transom design

The 26W or Weekender and Daysailor was built from 1975 to 1983. It has a longer cockpit and shorter coach house. It has a lighter displacement. It displaces 5,200 lb (2,359 kg) and carries 2,200 lb (998 kg) of ballast. From 1978 to 1983 a one-design variation was built with the same displacement.
