= Alerion Express 19 =

Sailboat class

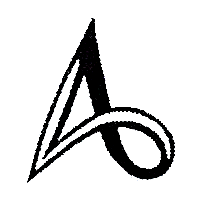

Development
- Designer: Gary Hoyt
- Location: United States
- Year: 1998
- Builder: TPI Composites
- Role: Cruiser

Boat
- Displacement: 1,750 lb (794 kg)
- Draft: 4.17 ft (1.27 m) with centerboard down

Hull
- Type: monohull
- Construction: fiberglass
- LOA: 19.17 ft (5.84 m)
- LWL: 18.92 ft (5.77 m)
- Beam: 8.67 ft (2.64 m)
- Engine: Outboard motor

Hull appendages
- Keel: keel and centerboard
- Ballast: 300 lb (136 kg)
- Rudder: transom-mounted rudder

Rig
- Rig type: Catboat rig

Sails
- Sailplan: catboat
- Mainsail area: 272 sq ft (25.3 m^{2})
- Total sail area: 272 sq ft (25.3 m^{2})

The Alerion Express 19 is an American trailerable sailboat that was designed by Gary Hoyt as a cruiser and first built in 1998.

The design is based upon traditional 19th century New England catboats.

== Production ==
The design was built by TPI Composites in Rhode Island, United States, starting in 1998, but it is now out of production.

== Design ==
Hoyt intended the boat to address what he saw as several deficiencies in catboat designs, including poor upwind performance, excessive weather helm, reefing complexities and excessive weight for both sailing and ground transportation.

The Alerion Express 19 is a recreational keelboat, built predominantly of fiberglass, with wood trim. It has a single sail catboat rig with an aluminum, or optional carbon fiber mast. The hull has a plumb stem, plumb transom, a kick-up transom-hung rudder with a false rudder head controlled by a tiller and a fixed stub keel with a centerboard. It displaces 1,750 lb (794 kg) and carries 300 lb (136 kg) of ballast.

The boat has a draft of 4.17 ft (1.27 m) with the centerboard extended and 12 in (30 cm) with it retracted, allowing beaching or ground transportation on a trailer.

The boat is normally fitted with a small 4 to 6 hp (3 to 4 kW) outboard motor for docking and maneuvering.

The design has sleeping accommodation for two people, with a double "V"-berth in the bow and a portable head. The cockpit has a drop-leaf table that is mounted to the centerboard trunk.

For sailing the design is equipped with a rotating mast that allows reefing the loose-footed sail about the mast. It also has a unique, patented, L-shaped boom that mounts into the deck just behind the mast, acting as a boom vang. The boom design allows easy reefing of the sail.

It has a hull speed of 5.6 kn (10.4 km/h).

== Operational history ==
In a 2010 review Steve Henkel found fault with the design due to its small cabin space and 3.5 ft (1.1 m) headroom, which he termed "somewhat less generous".

A July 2000 review by Darrell Nicholson on boats.com note, "In 1998 [Hoyt] designed and built the 19' Alerion cat 'to combine the proven virtues of the catboat with modern sailing performance.' From the outset, cats have been recognized for their shallow-water capabilities, sprightly acceleration, superior load-carrying and comforting stability. Hoyt's new cat is close enough to the mold to provide all of the above. In addition, its free-standing carbon fiber spar, self-vanging boom, dagger rudder, and light displacement take advantage of developments that weren't around in either 1840 or 1962. These features combine to make the Alerion quicker. Hoyt has sailed his creation against the best of the Sanderling racing fleets and has demonstrated a speed edge of almost a minute a mile in all but the lightest airs."

In an August 2000 review naval architect Bob Perry wrote, "independence is an important part of sailing for me. I see this catboat as a way for the less-than-athletic sailor to get away by himself and sail safe and dry in any weather. I hate outboards, so I'd give it a try without auxiliary power for a while. I'd just fit a tiller-operated autopilot, pack a generous lunch, take a few issues of The Audiophile Voice and enjoy a day of relaxing sailing and reading. If this sounds good, don't overlook Garry Hoyt's new catboat. Sailboats don't have to be complicated to be fun."

== See also ==
- List of sailing boat types

Related development

- Alerion Express 28
