= Pearson 23 =

1978 US recreational keelboat

Development
- Designer: William Shaw
- Location: United States
- Year: 1978
- No. built: 42
- Builder: Pearson Yachts
- Role: Cruiser
- Name: Pearson 23

Boat
- Displacement: 3,500 lb (1,588 kg)
- Draft: 4.00 ft (1.22 m)

Hull
- Type: monohull
- Construction: fiberglass
- LOA: 23.00 ft (7.01 m)
- LWL: 20.00 ft (6.10 m)
- Beam: 7.98 ft (2.43 m)
- Engine: outboard motor

Hull appendages
- Keel: fin keel
- Ballast: 1,300 lb (590 kg)
- Rudder: transom-mounted rudder

Rig
- Rig type: masthead sloop
- I foretriangle height: 28.40 ft (8.66 m)
- J foretriangle base: 9.30 ft (2.83 m)
- P mainsail luff: 24.30 ft (7.41 m)
- E mainsail foot: 8.00 ft (2.44 m)

Sails
- Sailplan: masthead sloop
- Mainsail area: 97.20 sq ft (9.030 m^{2})
- Jib/genoa area: 132.06 sq ft (12.269 m^{2})
- Total sail area: 229.26 sq ft (21.299 m^{2})

Racing
- PHRF: 240

The Pearson 23 is a recreational keelboat built by Pearson Yachts in the United States from 1978 until 1981 with 42 boats completed.

The Pearson 23C is a 1983 cat rigged development of the sloop-rigged Pearson 23.

== Design ==
The Pearson 23 is a , built predominantly of fiberglass, with wood trim and a masthead sloop rig. The hull has a raked stem, a plumb transom, a transom-hung rudder controlled by a tiller and a fixed fin keel or optional keel and centerboard. It displaces 3,500 lb (1,588 kg) and carries 1,300 lb (590 kg) of ballast.

The keel-equipped version of the boat has a draft of 4.00 ft (1.22 m), while the centerboard-equipped version has a draft of 5.17 ft (1.58 m) with the centerboard extended and 2.33 ft (0.71 m) with it retracted, allowing operation in shallow water or ground transportation on a trailer.

The boat is normally fitted with a small 3 to 6 hp (2 to 4 kW) outboard motor for docking and maneuvering.

The design has sleeping accommodation for four people, with a double "V"-berth in the bow cabin and two straight settee beryhs in the main cabin. The galley is located under the companionway ladder and is equipped with a stove and a sink. The head is located just aft of the bow cabin on the port side. Cabin headroom is 56 in (142 cm).

The design has a PHRF racing average handicap of 240 and a hull speed of 6.0 kn (11.1 km/h).

== Reception ==
The boat is supported by an active class club, the Pearson Yachts Portal.

In a 2010 review Steve Henkel wrote, "this boat is the sloop version of the Pearson 23 catboat ... Both versions used virtually the same hull molds and tooling ... The sloop came with either a fin keel with external lead ballast, or a keel-centerboard combination, as did the cat ... However, the sloop has a shorter mast (31 feet off the water instead of 36 1/2 feet for the cat), about 10% more sail area (229 sq, ft. vs. 210 for the cat), and includes the performance benefits contributed by the slot effect inherent in the sloop and missing in the cat configuration. Best features: Quality construction and a wholesome design make her a good starter sailboat for cruising. Worst features: Not the easiest boat to launch from a trailer, whether fin-keeler or centerboarder."
