= Pearson 22 =

1968 US recreational keelboat

Development
- Designer: William Shaw
- Location: United States
- Year: 1968
- Builder: Pearson Yachts
- Role: Racer-Cruiser
- Name: Pearson 22

Boat
- Displacement: 2,600 lb (1,179 kg)
- Draft: 3.42 ft (1.04 m)

Hull
- Type: monohull
- Construction: fiberglass
- LOA: 22.25 ft (6.78 m)
- LWL: 18.50 ft (5.64 m)
- Beam: 7.75 ft (2.36 m)
- Engine: outboard motor

Hull appendages
- Keel: fin keel
- Ballast: 1,000 lb (454 kg)
- Rudder: skeg-mounted/internally-mounted spade-type/transom-mounted rudder

Rig
- Rig type: Bermuda rig
- I foretriangle height: 24.20 ft (7.38 m)
- J foretriangle base: 9.20 ft (2.80 m)
- P mainsail luff: 23.00 ft (7.01 m)
- E mainsail foot: 9.30 ft (2.83 m)

Sails
- Sailplan: fractional rigged sloop
- Mainsail area: 106.95 sq ft (9.936 m^{2})
- Jib/genoa area: 11.32 sq ft (1.052 m^{2})
- Total sail area: 218.27 sq ft (20.278 m^{2})

Racing
- PHRF: 246

The Pearson 22 is a recreational keelboat built by Pearson Yachts in the United States from 1968 until 1972.

== Design ==
The Pearson 22 is built predominantly of fiberglass with a balsa-cored deck. It has a fractional sloop rig, a raked stem, a slightly reverse transom, an internally mounted spade-type rudder controlled by a tiller and a fixed swept fin keel. It displaces 2,600 lb (1,179 kg) and carries 1,000 lb (454 kg) of ballast.

The boat has a draft of 3.42 ft (1.04 m) with the standard keel and is normally fitted with a small 3 to 6 hp (2 to 4 kW) outboard motor for docking and maneuvering.

The design has sleeping accommodation for four people, with a double "V"-berth in the bow cabin and two straight settee berths in the main cabin. The galley is located on both sides just aft of the bow cabin. The galley is equipped with an optional stove and a sink. The head is located in the bow cabin under the "V"-berth. Cabin headroom is 50 in (127 cm).

The design has a PHRF racing average handicap of 246 and a hull speed of 5.8 kn (10.7 km/h).

== Reception ==
In a 2010 review Steve Henkel wrote, "Pearson's literature bills this boat as 'to sailing what a sports car is to driving—a high performance ... beautifully balanced design that puts fun into getting there ... took the season championship although she was the smallest boat in her fleet ... headed for one-design racing in many areas.' In hindsight, it appears that reality did not match the brochure writer's dreams. She was discontinued after four years, superseded by slightly larger cruisers like the Pearson 26. Best features: With more ballast, lower center of gravity, and the highest D/L ratio versus her otherwise very similar comp[etitor]s, the Pearson 22 is probably the stiffest boat in the group. That may make her fastest too, sailing without handicap, at least in a moderate breeze. (Her PHRF rating indicates she's fastest, too.) Worst features: She's neither wide nor tall down below, giving her relatively low points on the Space Index scale. The outboard engine controls are far aft of the cockpit, and the prop is beyond the counter stern, which would make us worry about prop cavitation when hobby horsing in a seaway."
