= Alan Lucas =

Australian yachtsman and writer (1936–2025)

Alan Gordon Lucas OAM (3 July 1936 – 10 July 2025) was an Australian yachtsman and writer of boat cruising guides and other books relating to life on the sea. His Cruising the Coral Coast was the second cruising guide to be published in Australia.

Lucas' most popular boat cruising guides are Cruising the Coral Coast and Cruising the New South Wales Coast. He is also a regular contributor to number of boating magazines including The Coastal Passage, Afloat, Australian Sailing, Australian Yachting, Cruising Helmsman and an occasional contributor to the Good Old Boat magazine.

Lucas died on 10 July 2025 at the age of 89.

== Awards ==
In November 2010, Lucas was awarded a NSW Maritime Medal for his support of the marine community, especially his coastal guides for the safe navigation of the east coast. In 2015, Lucas was presented with the Medal of the Order of Australia.

== Bibliography ==
=== Cruising Guides/Atlas ===
- Cruising the Coral Coast (1968) – now up to 9th edition (2017)
- Cruising the New South Wales Coast (1976) – now up to 6th edition
- Cruising Papua New Guinea (1980)
- Cruising New Caledonia and Vanuatu (1981)
- Cruising the Solomons (1981)
- Red Sea and Indian Ocean Cruising Guide (1985)
- New South Wales Boat Launching Ramp Atlas (1989)
- Sydney to Central Coast Waterways Guide (1991)
- Australian Cruising Guide (1994)

=== Boat Building ===
- How to Build Small Boats (1975)
- The Tools and Materials of Boat Building (1978)
- Fitting Out Below Decks (1979)
- Fitting Out Above Decks (1982)
- Fitting out Mechanically (1982)

=== Encyclopaedia ===
- The Complete Illustrated Encyclopaedia of Boating (1977)

=== General Interest ===
- Just Cruising (1969)
- How to Sail Small Boats (1975)
- Barrier Reef Rendezvous (1978)
- The Schooner (1979)
- The Cruising Boat (1979)
- Cruising Companion (1985)
- Cruising to Europe (1986)
- Cruising in Tropical Waters and Coral (1987)
- Cruising Australians (1989)
- Off Watch (2007)
- Simple Solutions (2015)
- Reefed in the Coral Sea : 500 wrecks, thousands of human tragedies (2016)
