= Pearson 28 =

1970s American recreational keelboat

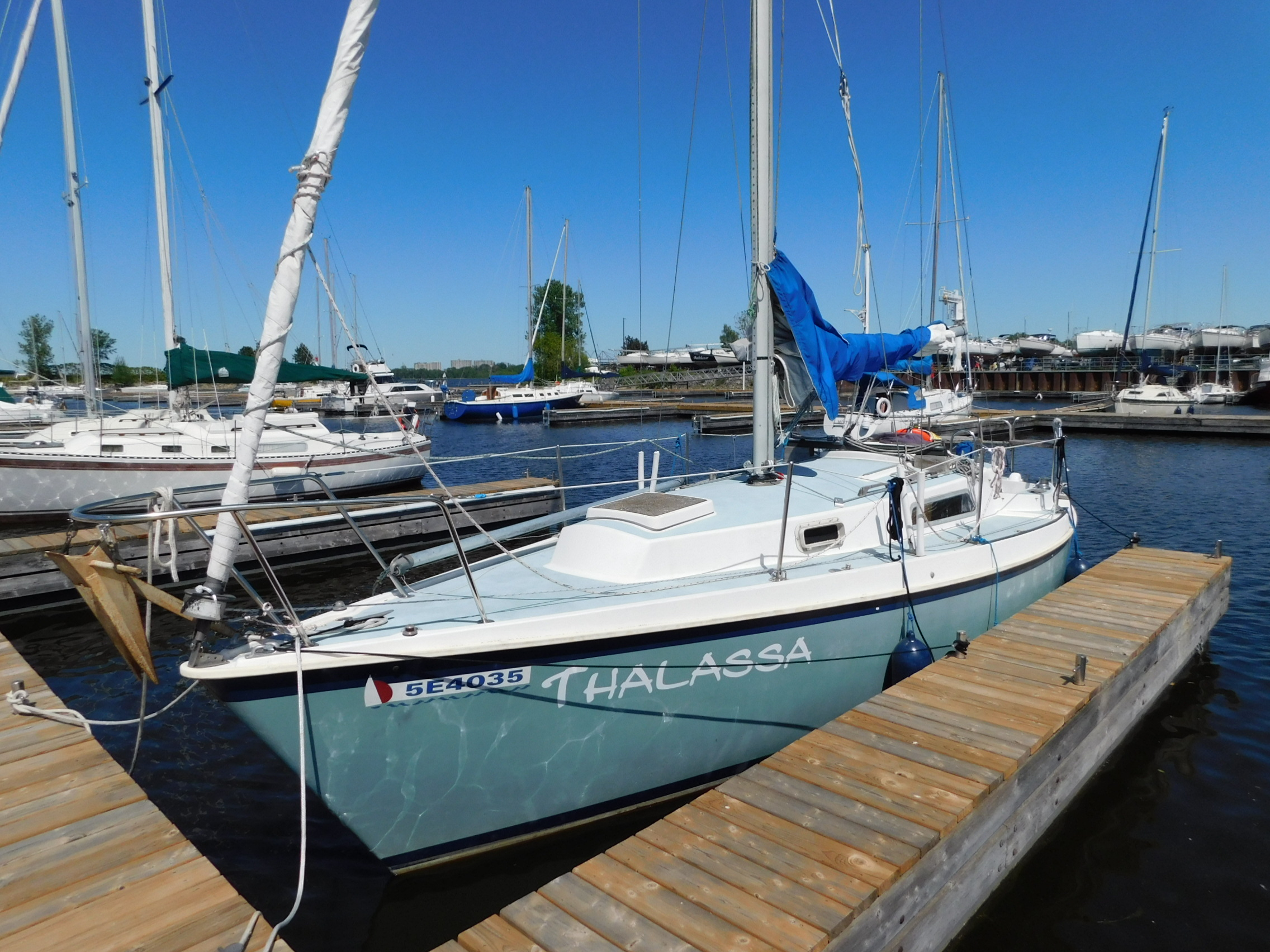

Development
- Designer: William Shaw
- Location: United States
- Year: 1975
- Builder: Pearson Yachts
- Name: Pearson 28

Boat
- Displacement: 7,850 lb (3,561 kg)
- Draft: 5.00 ft (1.52 m)

Hull
- Type: Monohull
- Construction: Fiberglass
- LOA: 28.00 ft (8.53 m)
- LWL: 24.00 ft (7.32 m)
- Beam: 9.25 ft (2.82 m)
- Engine: Universal Atomic 4 gasoline engine

Hull appendages
- Keel: fin keel
- Ballast: 3,530 lb (1,601 kg)
- Rudder: internally-mounted spade-type rudder

Rig
- General: Masthead sloop
- I foretriangle height: 36.50 ft (11.13 m)
- J foretriangle base: 11.83 ft (3.61 m)
- P mainsail luff: 32.00 ft (9.75 m)
- E mainsail foot: 11.00 ft (3.35 m)

Sails
- Mainsail area: 176.00 sq ft (16.351 m^{2})
- Jib/genoa area: 215.90 sq ft (20.058 m^{2})
- Total sail area: 391.90 sq ft (36.409 m^{2})

The Pearson 28 is a recreational keelboat by Pearson Yachts in the United States from 1975 to 1982. The keel and interior were updated in 1982. It was replaced in 1985 by the Pearson 28-2.

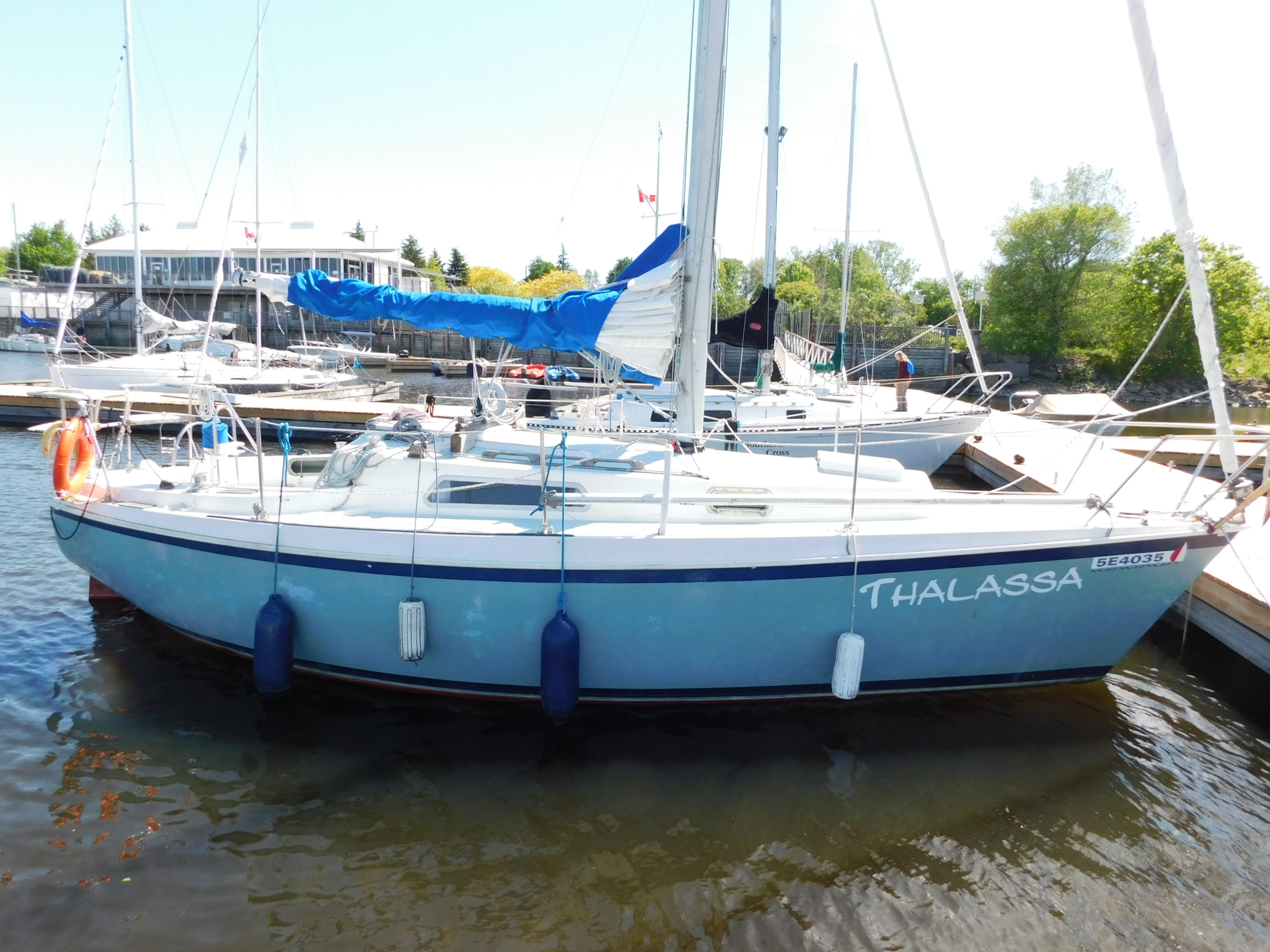
Pearson 28

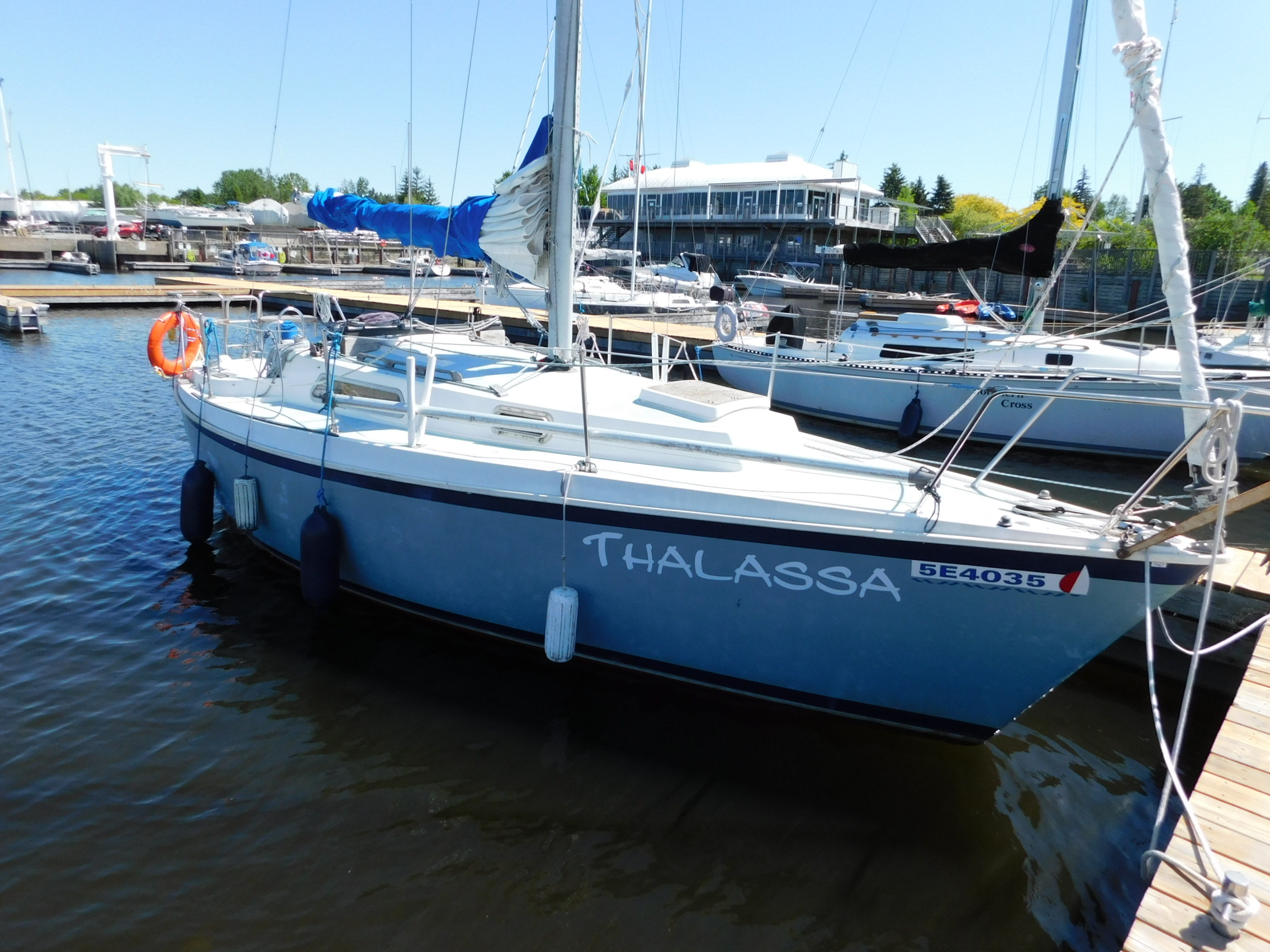
Pearson 28

Designed by William Shaw, the fiberglass hull has a balsa cored deck. It has an internally-mounted spade-type rudder. The early version had an optional shoal draft keel. The boat has a hull speed of 6.56 kn (12.15 km/h).

It has a masthead sloop rig.
