= Pearson 28-2 =

1980s American recreational keelboat

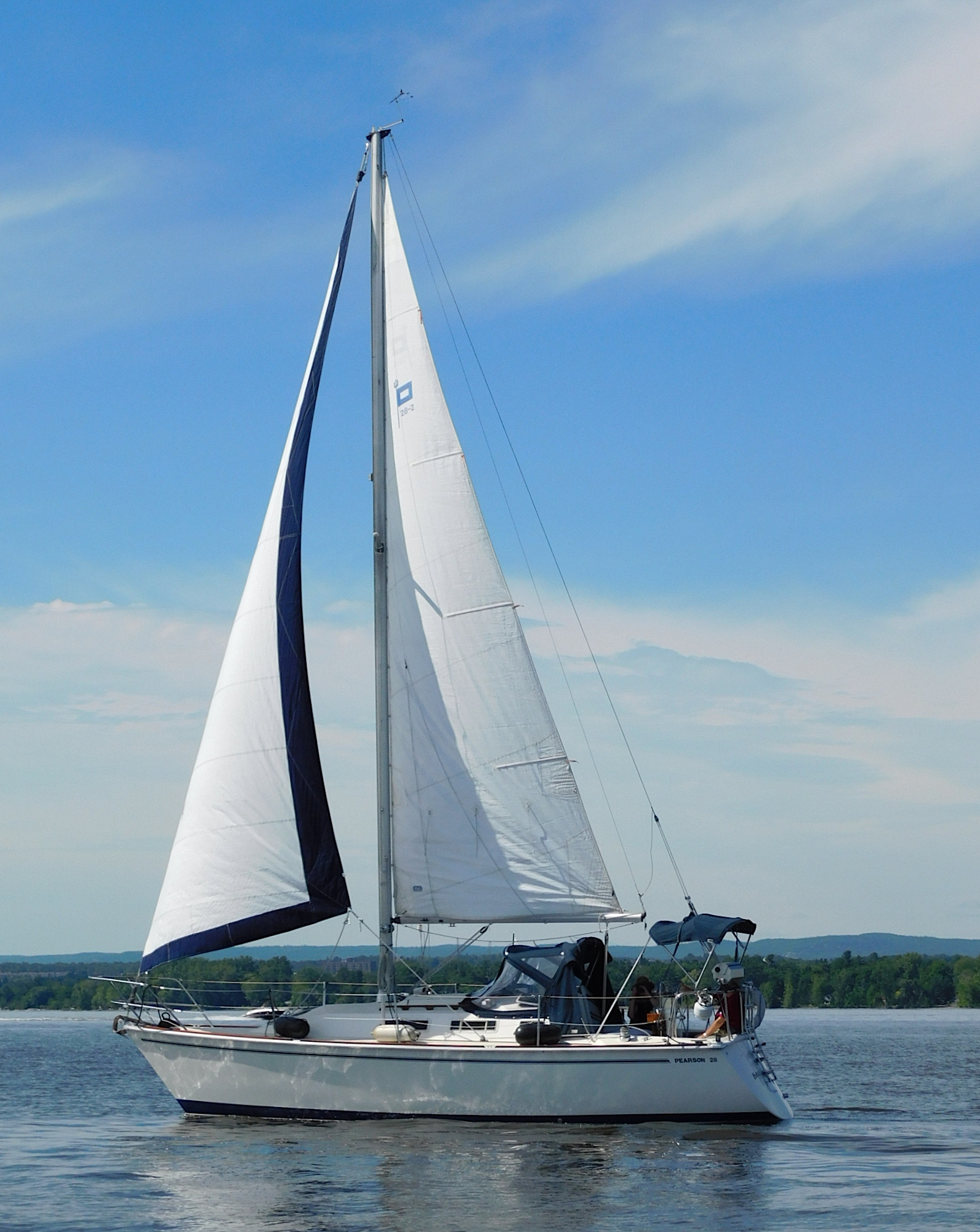

Development
- Designer: William Shaw
- Location: United States
- Year: 1985
- Builder: Pearson Yachts
- Name: Pearson 28-2

Boat
- Displacement: 7,000 lb (3,175 kg)
- Draft: 4.83 ft (1.47 m)

Hull
- Type: Monohull
- Construction: Fiberglass
- LOA: 28.46 ft (8.67 m)
- LWL: 24.47 ft (7.46 m)
- Beam: 9.83 ft (3.00 m)
- Engine: Yanmar 2GM20 diesel engine

Hull appendages
- Keel: fin keel
- Ballast: 2,550 lb (1,157 kg)
- Rudder: internally-mounted spade-type rudder

Rig
- General: Masthead sloop
- I foretriangle height: 37.50 ft (11.43 m)
- J foretriangle base: 11.25 ft (3.43 m)
- P mainsail luff: 31.92 ft (9.73 m)
- E mainsail foot: 10.75 ft (3.28 m)

Sails
- Mainsail area: 171.57 sq ft (15.939 m^{2})
- Jib/genoa area: 210.94 sq ft (19.597 m^{2})
- Total sail area: 382.51 sq ft (35.536 m^{2})

Racing
- PHRF: 186 (average)

The Pearson 28-2 is a recreational keelboat built by Pearson Yachts in the United States from 1985 to 1989. It was preceded by the Pearson 28.

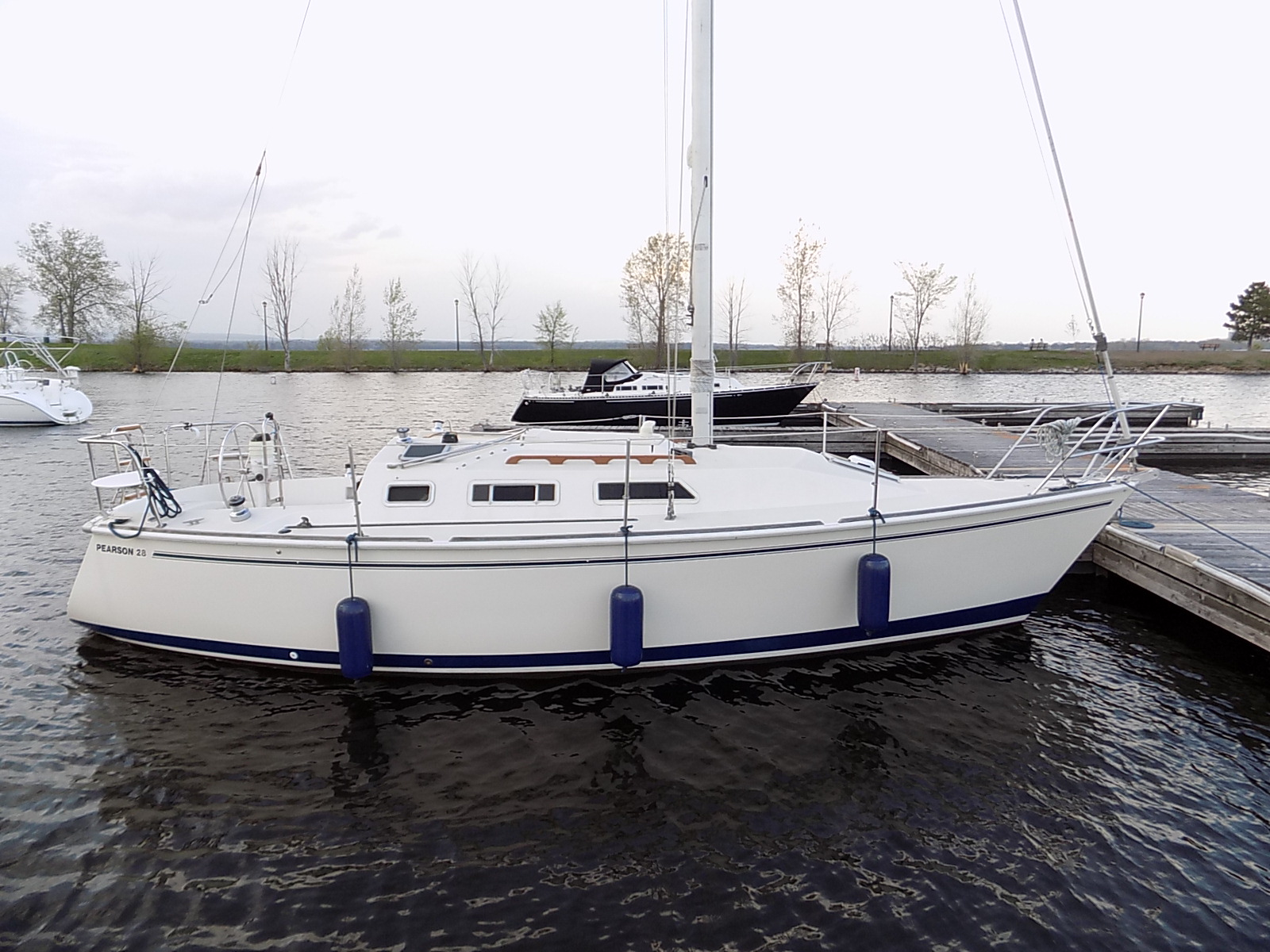
Pearson 28-2

Designed by William Shaw, the fiberglass hull has a balsa cored deck, and an internally-mounted spade-type rudder. An optional shoal draft keel was available, with a draft of 3.50 ft (1.07 m). It has a hull speed of 6.63 kn (12.28 km/h).

It has a masthead sloop rig.
