= Good Old Boat =

Magazine for people interested in maintaining sailboats

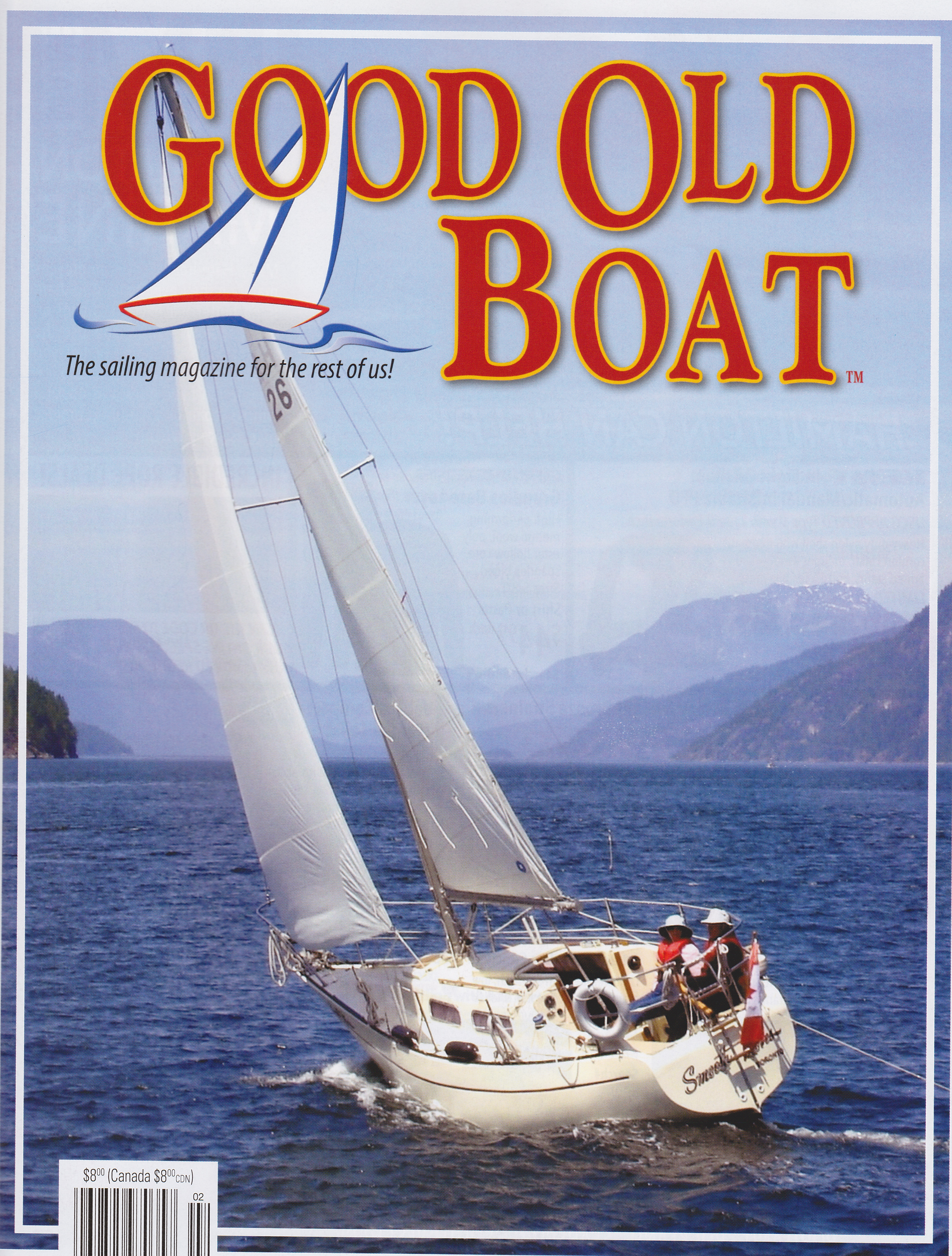
- Good Old Boat magazine
- Editor: Andy Cross and Wendy Mitman Clarke
- Categories: Recreational Boating
- Frequency: Bi-monthly
- Circulation: 30,000
- Publisher: Good Old Boat, Inc
- Founder: Karen Larson and Jerry Powlas
- First issue: June 1, 1998; 26 years ago
- Country: United States of America
- Language: English
- Website: http://www.goodoldboat.com
- ISSN: 1099-6354

Good Old Boat (GOB) is a niche magazine dedicated to hands-on sailboat owners. Good Old Boat publishes reviews, stories from sailors, technical articles about equipment installations and repairs, and essays.

== Overview ==
The company was an early adopter (1997) of a virtual organization business model, in that there is no central office or headquarters. Rather, the few employees and a larger number of freelancers, many of whom are regular contributors, work remotely in various locations around the United States and the world.

The magazine differs from advertising-driven publications in that while it accepts a limited amount of advertising, revenue is primarily driven through subscriptions and newsstand sales. In addition, article titles are absent from the cover art, a journalistic design decision differing from many other publications.

== History ==
Good Old Boat was founded and edited by Karen Larson and Jerry Powlas in 1997. In January 2018 ownership changed hands to former employees Karla Sandness, Michael Robertson and Nancy Koucky.. Sandness is today the sole owner.

== Notable contributors ==
- Reese Palley
- Lin and Larry Pardey
- Robert Perry
- Alan Lucas
