= Alerion Express 28 =

Sailboat class

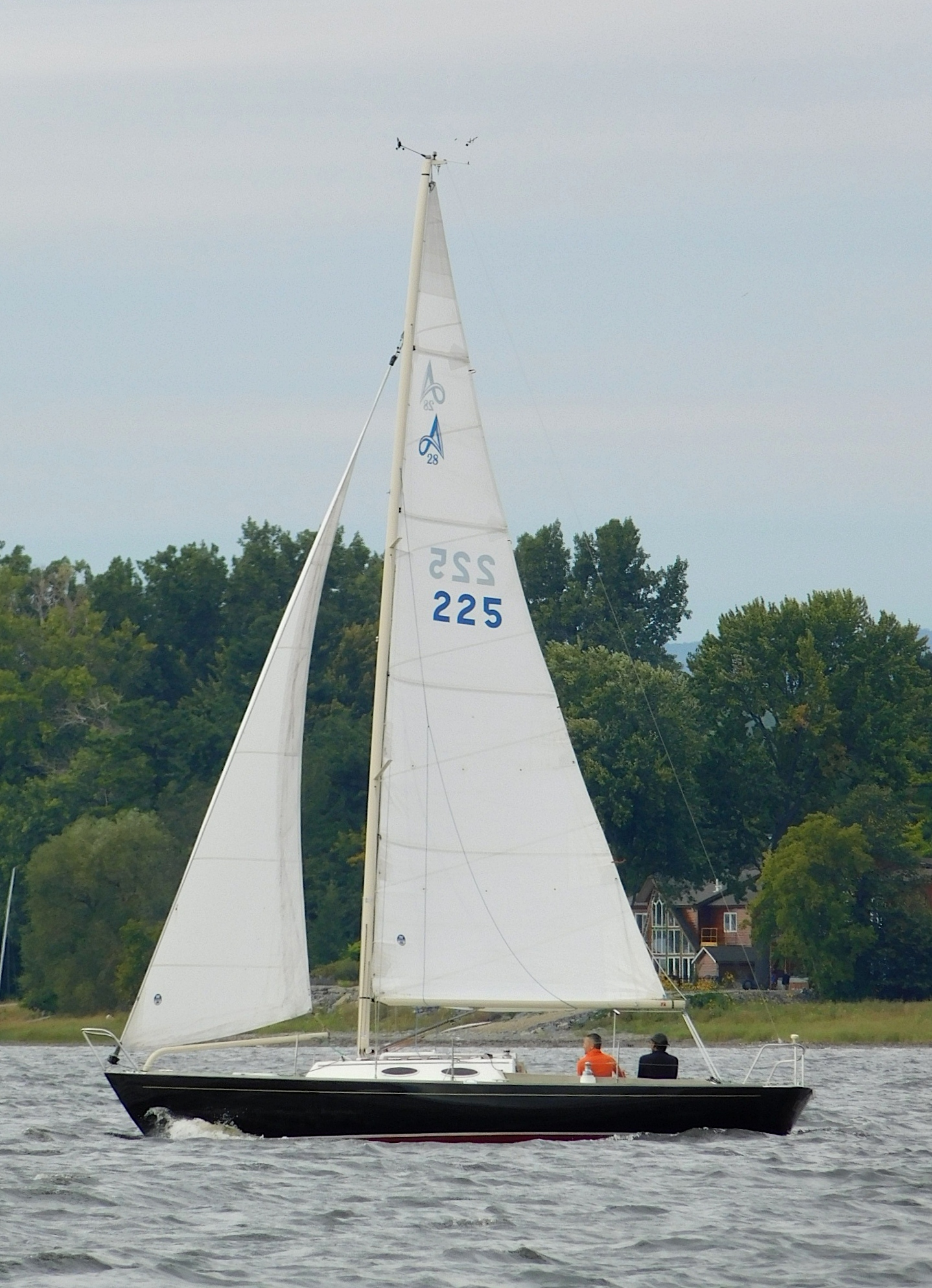

Development
- Designer: Carl Schumacher
- Location: United States
- Year: 1990
- No. built: 470 (2019)
- Builders: Holby Marine; Tillotson Pearson; Alerion Yachts
- Role: Day sailer-cruiser
- Name: Alerion Express 28

Boat
- Displacement: 4,400 lb (1,996 kg)
- Draft: 4.50 ft (1.37 m)

Hull
- Type: monohull
- Construction: fiberglass
- LOA: 28.25 ft (8.61 m)
- LWL: 22.82 ft (6.96 m)
- Beam: 8.18 ft (2.49 m)
- Engine: Volvo Penta MD2010 10 hp (7 kW) diesel engine

Hull appendages
- Keel: fin keel
- Ballast: 2,000 lb (907 kg)
- Rudder: skeg-mounted/internally-mounted spade-type/transom-mounted rudder

Rig
- Rig type: Bermuda rig
- I foretriangle height: 30.00 ft (9.14 m)
- J foretriangle base: 9.75 ft (2.97 m)
- P mainsail luff: 33.00 ft (10.06 m)
- E mainsail foot: 12.50 ft (3.81 m)

Sails
- Sailplan: fractional rigged sloop
- Mainsail area: 206.25 sq ft (19.161 m^{2})
- Jib/genoa area: 146.25 sq ft (13.587 m^{2})
- Total sail area: 352.50 sq ft (32.748 m^{2})

The Alerion Express 28 is a recreational keelboat. Most are built by Tillotson Pearson. It has a fractional sloop rig with an optional Hoyt self-tacking jib boom.

The fiberglass hull has overhangs. Freeboard that is low compared to modern standards. An internally mounted semi-balanced spade-type rudder is controlled by a tiller. It has a lazarette and a fixed fin keel. It has a draft of 4.50 ft (1.37 m) with the standard keel.

It has three berths. A portable head is in the V-berth.

== Gallery ==
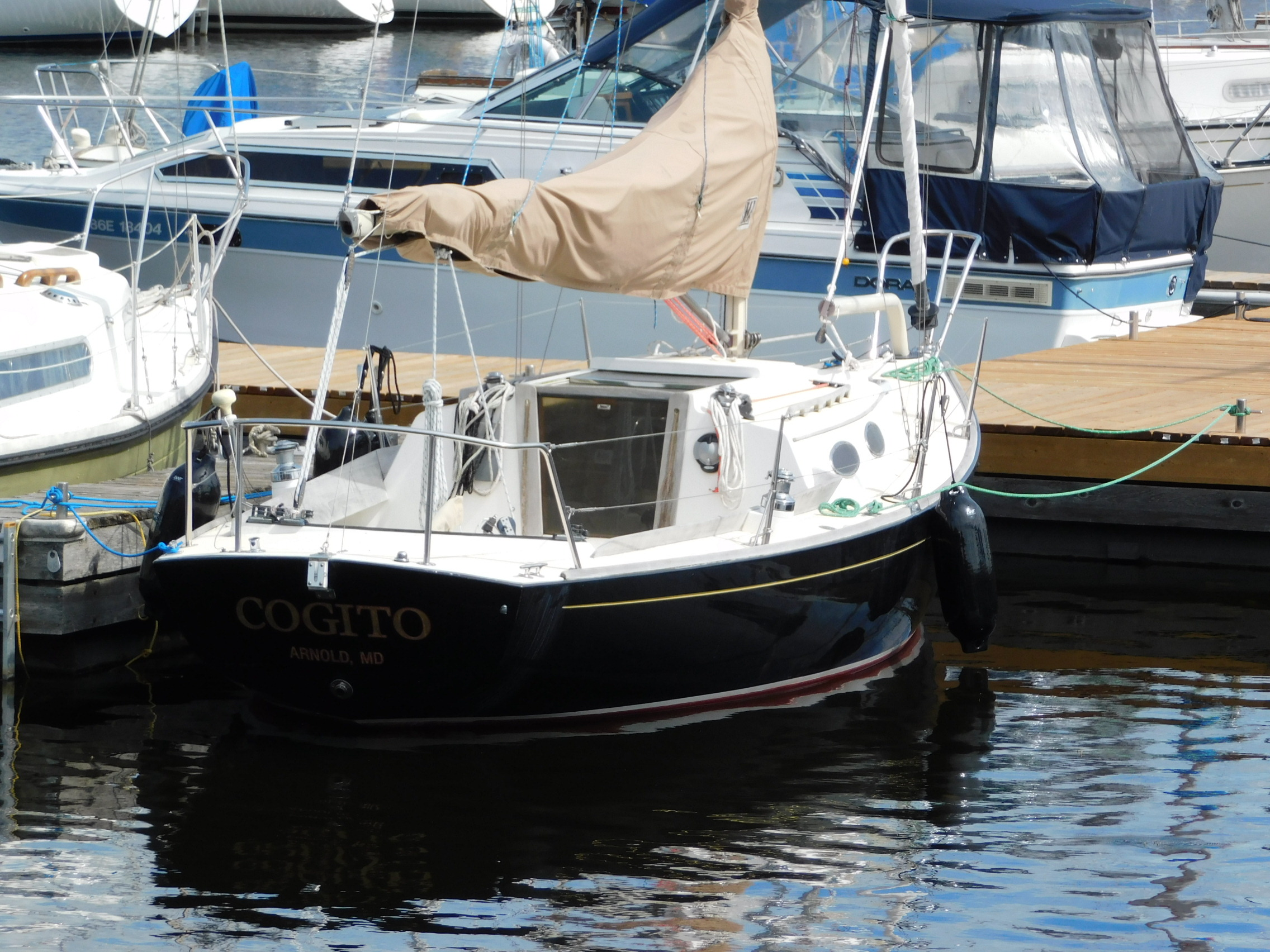
Angled transom

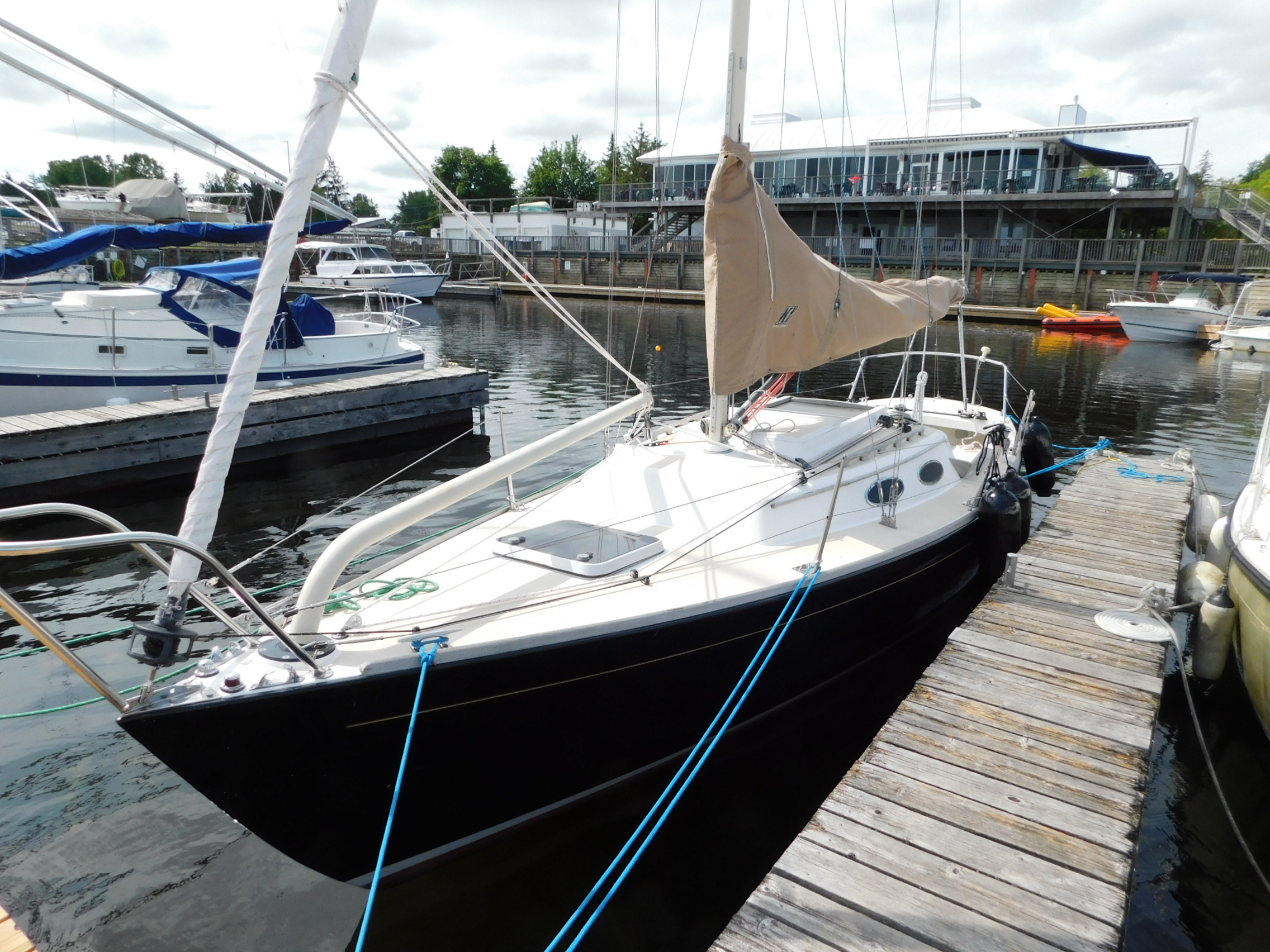
Self-tacking Hoyt jib boom

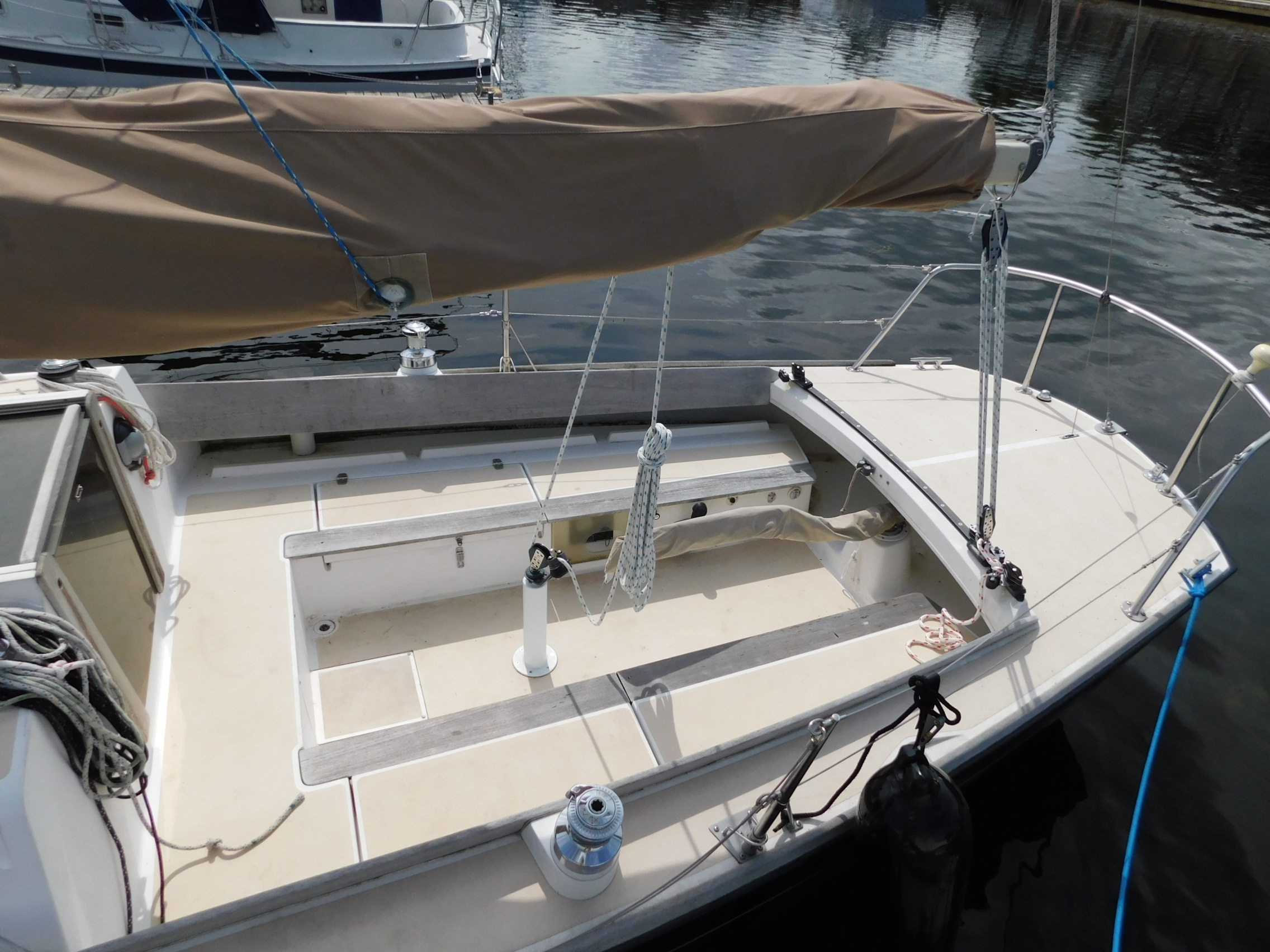
Cockpit and lazarette
