= Pearson Vanguard =

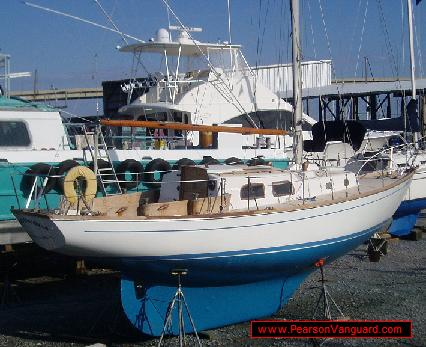

Development
- Designer: Philip Rhodes
- Year: 1963
- No. built: 404
- Design: CCA
- Builder: Pearson Yachts
- Name: Pearson Vanguard

Boat
- Displacement: 10,300 lb (4,672 kg)
- Draft: 4.5 ft (1.4 m)

Hull
- Type: Monohull
- Construction: Fiberglass
- LOA: 32.8 ft (10.0 m)
- LWL: 22.4 ft (6.8 m)
- Beam: 9.3 ft (2.8 m)
- Engine: Universal Atomic 4 30 hp (22 kW) gasoline engine

Hull appendages
- Keel: full keel
- Ballast: 4,250 lb (1,928 kg)

Rig
- Rig type: Sloop
- I foretriangle height: 37.50 ft (11.43 m)
- J foretriangle base: 12.25 ft (3.73 m)
- P mainsail luff: 32.50 ft (9.91 m)
- E mainsail foot: 14.75 ft (4.50 m)

Sails
- Sailplan: Masthead rig
- Mainsail area: 239.69 sq ft (22.268 m^{2})
- Jib/genoa area: 229.69 sq ft (21.339 m^{2})
- Total sail area: 469.38 sq ft (43.607 m^{2})

Racing
- PHRF: 216 (average)

The Pearson Vanguard is a sloop-rigged sailboat designed in 1962 by Philip Rhodes. These boats were built by Pearson Yachts from 1963 to 1967. Pearson Vanguards are a traditional cruiser known for world travel.

== Production ==
It is claimed 404 of masthead rigged sloops were made. The standard arrangement has a small galley aft and settees/berths port and starboard. Their hulls, like most early fiberglass boat hulls, are known for being significantly thicker than more modern fiberglass construction with alternating layers of 1.5 oz. fiberglass mat and 24 oz. woven roving. The full shoal-draft keel has a 4250 lb. lead ballast embedded into it with a displacement of 10,300 - 12,600 lbs.

== Variants ==
The Vanguard was available in a sloop rig with either a standard height or tall mast. It was powered bys an "Atomic 4" gasoline engine, however many have been replaced with marine diesels. It was equipped with tiller steering, but many have been converted to a wheel.

== Misc ==
There is an active Owners' Group at Yahoo! Groups and a resource website at PearsonVanguard.org.

== See also ==
- Alberg 35
- Albin Vega
