= Pearson Yachts =

Defunct American manufacturer

- Company type: Public company; later Subsidiary
- Industry: Sailboat builder
- Founded: Bristol, Rhode Island, United States (1956)
- Founder: Clinton Pearson; Everett Pearson
- Defunct: 1991
- Fate: Sold in bankruptcy
- Successor: Pearson Marine Group; USWatercraft
- Headquarters: Portsmouth, Rhode Island, United States
- Area served: North America; Shipped worldwide
- Key people: Carl Alberg; William Shaw
- Products: Sailboats
- Parent: Grumman Allied Industries

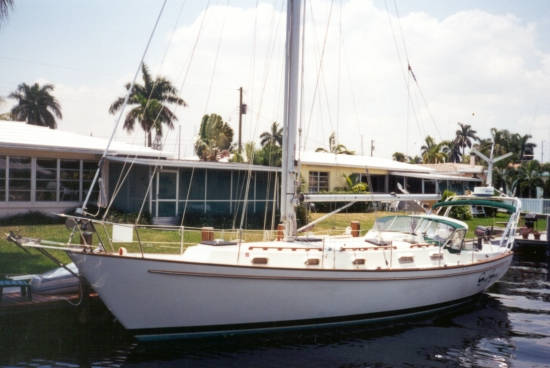
Pearson 424

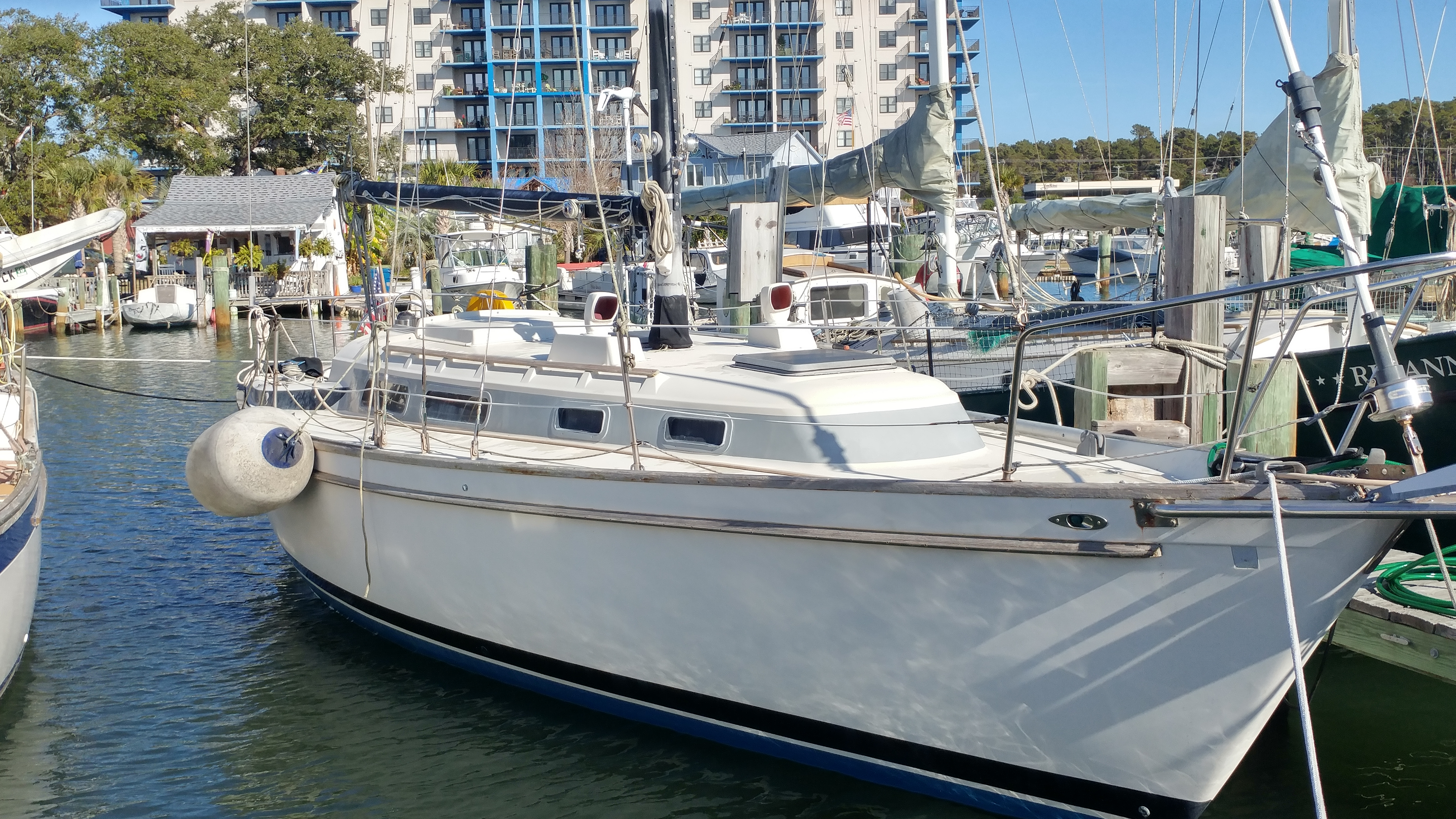
Pearson 323

Pearson Yachts was a sailboat manufacturer founded by Everett Pearson and Clinton Pearson in 1956. One of the first fiberglass sailboat manufacturers, they grew rapidly during the 60s and 70s, while also developing and designing new boats. However, the company changed ownership throughout the 1980s, after which the company filed for bankruptcy, and was eventually sold to Grumman Allied Industries in 1991. The rights to the name are now held by the Pearson Marine Group.

== History ==
=== Founding ===
In 1955, cousins Clinton and Everett Pearson began building fiberglass dinghies in their garage on County Street in Seekonk, Massachusetts. The fiberglass material and their methods of construction was brand new and untested. However, Tom Potter from American Boat Building approached the Pearsons with a project to build an auxiliary sailboat that would sell for under $10,000. Naval architect Carl Alberg was given the task of designing the boat. The result was the Triton 28 sailing auxiliary. The first boat was built in the cousins' garage, in time for the 1959 New York Boat Show.

=== Going public ===
In 1959, the Triton 28 was launched at the New York Boat Show. The cousins had to borrow money to pay for the transport of the boat from their garage to the show. The boat proved to be a hit, and the cousins had deposits for 17 orders by the end of the show. To raise the capital to acquire facilities to meet the demand, the cousins made Pearson Yachts public in April 1959. Upon returning to Rhode Island, the cousins purchased the old Herreshoff Yard as an additional production site. Pearson Yachts introduced a number of new models, most of which were also designed by Carl Alberg. By the end of the year, the newly founded Pearson Yachts had over one hundred employees and was turning out nearly one boat per day. This rapid corporate expansion led to cash flow problems. They attempted to get approval for an additional stock offering to raise much needed capital, but were unsuccessful.

=== Grumman takeover (1961–1991) ===
In 1961, Grumman Allied Industries purchased a controlling interest in Pearson Yachts. The Pearson cousins left the company in the 1960s, and Bill Shaw became the chief designer. One of Shaw's most notable designs is the flush decked Pearson 40, introduced in 1977.

Pearson filed for bankruptcy in 1991. At that time TPI Composites, formerly known as Tillotson-Pearson, purchased the rights to the Pearson Yachts brand name.

== Pearson models ==
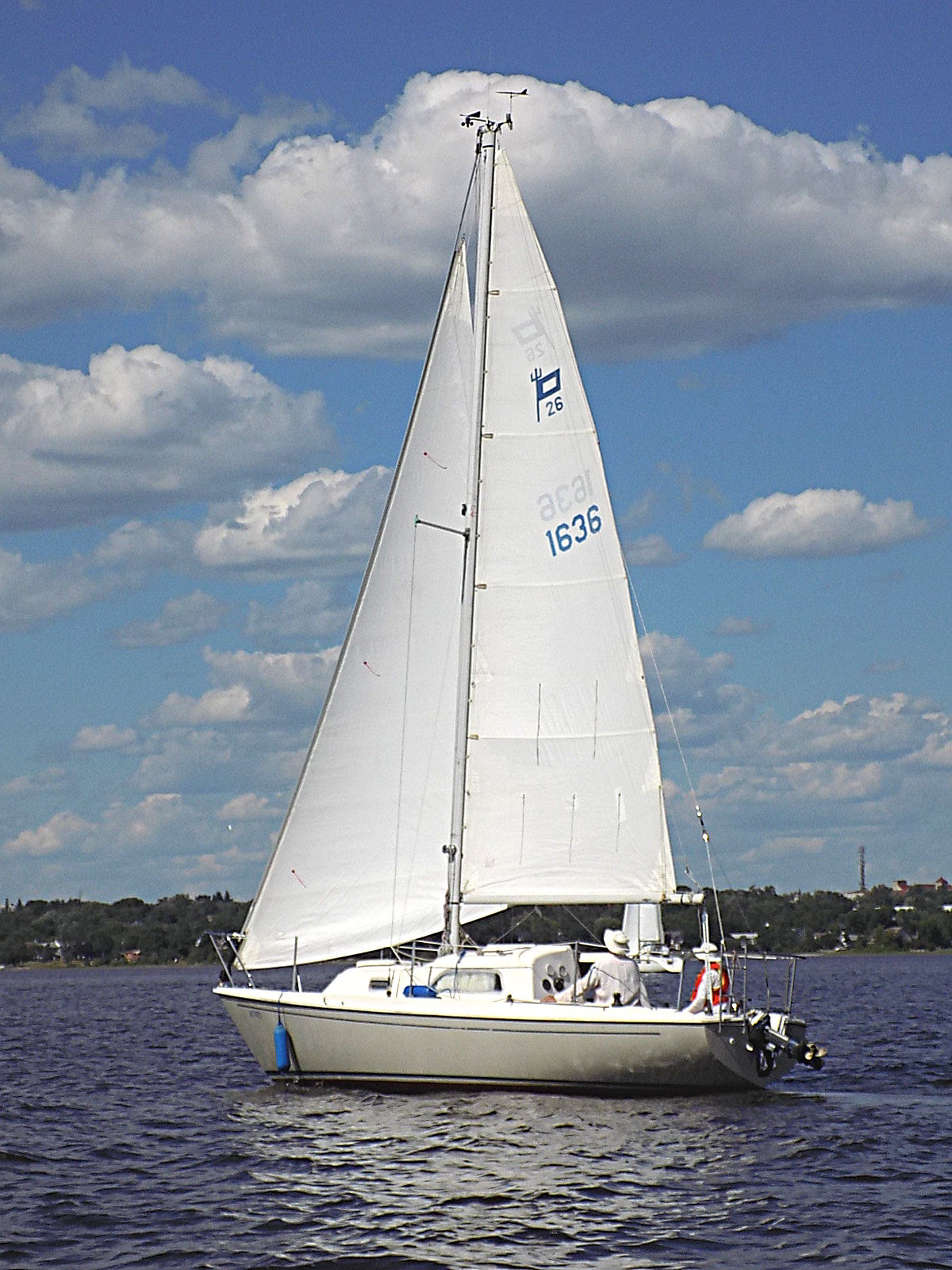
Pearson 26

- Pearson Plebe
- Pearson Hawk
- Pearson Tiger Cat
- Pearson Resolute
- Pearson Packet
- Hudson River Packet 18
- Pearson 22
- Pearson Ensign
- Pearson Electra
- Pearson 23
- Pearson 23C
- Pearson Lark
- Pearson 24
- Pearson Ariel
- Pearson Commander
- Pearson 26
- Pearson 27
- Pearson Renegade
- Pearson Triton
- Pearson 28
- Pearson 28-2
- Pearson Wanderer
- Pearson Coastal
- Pearson Flyer
- Pearson 300
- Pearson 30
- Pearson 303
- Pearson 31
- Pearson 31-2
- Pearson 32
- Pearson 32 Custom
- Pearson 323
- Pearson Vanguard
- Pearson 33
- Pearson 33-2
- Pearson 10M
- Pearson 34
- Pearson 34-2
- Pearson 35
- Alberg 35
- Pearson 36
- Pearson 36-2
- Pearson 36 Cutter
- Pearson 36 Pilot House
- Pearson 365
- Pearson 37
- Pearson 37-2
- Pearson 38
- Pearson Invicta
- Pearson 385
- Pearson 386
- Pearson 390
- Pearson 39
- Pearson 39-2
- Pearson 40
- Rhodes 41
- Pearson 419
- Pearson 422
- Pearson 424
- Rhodes 43
- Pearson Countess
- Pearson 530
- Pearson 530CC Ketch

== Tillotson Pearson models ==
- Alerion Express 19
- Freedom 21
- Freedom 25
- Freedom 28
- Freedom 28 Cat Ketch
- Freedom 30 Gary Mull designed
- Herreshoff Eagle
- J/32
- J/35
- J/92
- Navy 44 (M&R)

== See also ==
- Carl Alberg
- Bristol Yachts
