= Pearson 303 =

Sailboat class

Development
- Designer: William Shaw
- Location: United States
- Year: 1983
- No. built: more than 300
- Builder: Pearson Yachts
- Name: Pearson 303

Boat
- Displacement: 10,100 lb (4,581 kg)
- Draft: 4.33 ft (1.32 m)

Hull
- Type: Monohull
- Construction: Fiberglass
- LOA: 30.29 ft (9.23 m)
- LWL: 25.37 ft (7.73 m)
- Beam: 10.92 ft (3.33 m)
- Engine: Yanmar 3GM(F) 13 hp (10 kW) diesel engine

Hull appendages
- Keel: fin keel
- Ballast: 3,500 lb (1,588 kg)
- Rudder: Skeg-mounted rudder

Rig
- Rig type: Bermuda rig
- I foretriangle height: 40.40 ft (12.31 m)
- J foretriangle base: 13.40 ft (4.08 m)
- P mainsail luff: 34.80 ft (10.61 m)
- E mainsail foot: 10.80 ft (3.29 m)

Sails
- Sailplan: Masthead sloop
- Mainsail area: 187.92 sq ft (17.458 m^{2})
- Jib/genoa area: 270.68 sq ft (25.147 m^{2})
- Total sail area: 458.60 sq ft (42.605 m^{2})

The Pearson 303 is an American sailboat that was designed by William Shaw as a cruiser and first built in 1983.

== Production ==
The design was built by Pearson Yachts in the United States between 1983 and 1986. The company completed more than 300 examples of the design, but it is now out of production.

== Design ==
The Pearson 303 is a recreational keelboat, built predominantly of fiberglass with a balsa core and with wood trim. It has a masthead sloop rig, a raked stem, a vertical transom, a skeg-mounted rudder controlled by a wheel, with an emergency back-up tiller and a fixed fin keel. It displaces 10,100 lb (4,581 kg) and carries 3,500 lb (1,588 kg) of lead ballast.

The boat has a draft of 4.33 ft (1.32 m) with the standard keel fitted. It has 75 in (190 cm) of headroom, below decks.

The boat is fitted with a Japanese Yanmar 3GM(F) diesel engine of 13 hp (10 kW). The fuel tank holds 22 U.S. gallons (83 L; 18 imp gal) and the fresh water tank has a capacity of 38 U.S. gallons (140 L; 32 imp gal).

The boat's galley is located on the port side of the cabin and includes a sink, a two-burner alcohol stove and a 5.0 ft (1.5 m) icebox. Hot and cold running pressure water was a factory option. The cabin sole is made from teak and holly. The head has a privacy door and is located forward, just aft of the bow "V"-berth. Additional sleeping space is provided by the dinette settee, which has a folding table and the aft quarter berth which is a double. The total sleeping accommodation is for six people.

Ventilation is provided by eight opening cabin ports, plus two opening translucent hatches, one in the bow cabin and one in the main cabin.

The boat has internal jiffy-reefing. The cockpit has two genoa winches and two winches for the halyards. The mainsheet traveler is mounted on the bridge deck and the genoa has sheet tracks. There is an anchor locker in the bow.

== Operational history ==
A review in Practical Sailor magazine wrote of the design "A quick look at the numbers shows that the Pearson 303 is a conservative design, moderate in every respect ... They also suggest a boat that is not particularly fast ... Our conclusion is that the Pearson 303 is a big 30-footer, intended for safe coastal cruising. She admirably succeeds in doing what she was designed to do. The only risk accrues to those who mistake her for something she is not—an offshore, passage-making boat."

Practical Sailor however also faulted the design and its stablemates on company fortunes, saying, "the Pearson 303, and later the 34, 36, 37 and 39 seemed to be nearly the same boat drawn to different lengths. Indeed, in 1991, all of the above models, except the 303 (terminated in 1986), were in production at the same time. There was a bland sameness to them. Not only in terms of the standard hull and deck colors, non-skid pattern, window treatments and interior finish, but in their lines as well. One would suppose that designer Bill Shaw believed the formula to be successful, and for a time it probably was. Nevertheless, we suspect it also may have accounted for the company’s eventual demise ... It seems the company was consumed in a vortex spun of its own successful sameness."

David Liscio, writing in Sailing magazine in 2013 note, "Shaw, who was at the helm of Pearson Yachts as chief designer and corporate executive from 1964 to 1986, has been criticized for cranking out different models that look too much alike. Harsh tongues have lumped the Pearson 303 in with this group, but the 303, which Pearson labeled a performance cruiser, had found an audience of admirers ready and willing to accept a design that sacrifices a bit of speed and handling ability for additional space and comfort below deck." Liscio concluded. "Solidly built, affordably priced and easy to sail, with voluminous space below decks, the Pearson 303 is an ideal coastal cruising boat for a small family or a big-boat sailor looking to downsize."

A 2017 used boat review in the Spinsheet, some 31 years after production ended, remarked, "following a design philosophy that dates back to the company’s founding in 1955, Pearson Yachts introduced the Pearson 303, in the 1983 model year as a no excuses, Plain Jane cruising boat. After almost 25 years, she remains just that." The review concluded, "the Pearson 303 is today, as she was in 1983, an ideal boat for a couple or small family on a limited budget looking for a comfortable Bay or coastal cruiser."

== See also ==
- List of sailing boat types
