= William Shaw (yacht designer) =

American yacht designer (1926–2006)

- Born: William Harold Shaw; June 9, 1926; Providence, RI
- Died: August 20, 2006 (aged 80)
- Education: United States Merchant Marine Academy, 1947
- Employer(s): Sparkman & Stephens, Pearson Yachts
- Known for: Design of fiberglass sailing yachts. Cadet midshipman, US Navy, World War II; recalled to active duty, Korean War
- Spouse: Elizabeth "Beth" Thomson Shaw
- Parent(s): Myrtie Morris Shaw, Harold Victor Shaw
- Awards: The Isaac B. Merriman Award from the Barrington Yacht Club, the United States Merchant Marine Professional Achievement Award, the Charles F. Chapman Award for the marine industry

William Shaw (June 9, 1926 – August 20, 2006) was an American-born yacht designer known for his long tenure at Pearson Yachts as their Chief Naval Architect.

== Biography ==
Shaw was born in Providence, Rhode Island in 1926 and graduated from the United States Merchant Marine Academy of Kings Point, NY in 1947. He went on to serve in the US Navy during the Korean War.

After completing his tenure in the Navy, Bill was able to pursue his dream of yacht design. He joined the renowned firm of Sparkman & Stephens Naval Architects and Marine Engineers (S&S) in October 1952 as a designer. In 1961, he became a manager of Products of Asia, and was the chief designer of the America's Cup defender Columbia.

Shaw joined Pearson Yachts in 1964 as Chief Architect, eventually running the entire Pearson Yachts Division of Grumman. During his tenure, he and his team designed over 50 different sailboats and power boats. He spoke in 1999 with Steve Mitchell for Good Old Boat regarding his time at Pearson:

We put together a great team, and Grumman was great to work for. They were very supportive in getting us the best equipment and machinery. We had computers to help us cut out materials. They also expanded the Portsmouth facility later on so that we could build bigger boats.

Tom Hazelhurst remarked, "Under Bill's tutelage, they built damn good boats. I'm not saying that because I was their advertising man, but because I bought two of their boats. The boats just don't break."

Shaw died of complications of Alzheimer's disease on August 20, 2006. Shaw has had a lasting impact on the sailing community. The thousands of boats still sailing, some over 50 years old, are a testament to his design expertise. During his tenure at Pearson Yachts he received numerous awards, and Pearson became a world-renowned leader in the boatbuilding industry for quality fiberglass cruising and racing sailboats.

== Sailboat designs ==
Designs
NAME/TYPE	Length(ft/m)	First Built
Shaw 24	23.92' / 7.29m	1957
Dolphin 24	24.16' / 7.36m	1959
Nutmeg 24	24.50' / 7.47m	1964
Hughes 24	24.50' / 7.47m	1966
Lark 24	24.00' / 7.32m	1966
Coaster 30	30.00' / 9.14m	1966
Wanderer 30	30.25' / 9.22m	1966
Pearson 24	23.50' / 7.16m	1967
Renegade 27	27.17' / 8.28m	1967
Pearson 22	22.25' / 6.78m	1968
Pearson 35	35.00' / 10.67m	1968
Grumman Flyer	16.16' / 4.93m	1968
Pearson 43	42.75' / 13.03m	1969
Pearson 300	30.25' / 9.22m	1969
Pearson 33	32.92' / 10.03m	1969
Pearson 26	26.17' / 7.98m	1970
Pearson 39	39.25' / 11.96m	1970
Pearson 30	29.79' / 9.08m	1971
Pearson 390	39.00' / 11.89m	1972
Pearson 36	36.52' / 11.13m	1972
Pearson 10M	33.04' / 10.07m	1973
Pearson 28	28.00' / 8.53m	1975
Pearson 419	41.75' / 12.73m	1975
Pearson 26 Weekender	26.17' / 7.98m	1975
Pearson 323	32.25' / 9.83m	1976
Pearson 365 Ketch	36.42' / 11.10m	1976
Pearson 365	36.42' / 11.10m	1976
Pearson 31	31.00' / 9.45m	1977
Pearson 26 One-Design	26.17' / 7.98m	1978
Pearson 36 Pilot House	36.42' / 11.10m	1978
Pearson 424 Cutter	42.33' / 12.90m	1978
Pearson 40	39.92' / 12.17m	1979
Pearson 23	23.00' / 7.01m	1979
Pearson 32	31.75' / 9.68m	1979
Pearson 530	53.00' / 16.15m	1981
Pearson 36 Cutter	36.42' / 11.10m	1981
Pearson 367	36.42' / 11.10m	1981
Pearson 424 Ketch	42.33' / 12.90m	1981
Flyer	29.92' / 9.12m	1981
Pearson 37	36.92' / 11.25m	1982
Pearson 422	42.16' / 12.85m	1982
Pearson 23C	23.00' / 7.01m	1983
Pearson 303	30.29' / 9.23m	1983
Pearson 34	33.78' / 10.30m	1983
Pearson 385	38.25' / 11.66m	1984
Pearson 386	38.25' / 11.66m	1984
Pearson 36-2	36.50' / 11.13m	1985
Pearson 33-2	32.50' / 9.91m	1985
Pearson 28-2	28.46' / 8.67m	1985
Pearson 39-2	39.25' / 11.96m	1986
Pearson 31-2	30.67' / 9.35m	1987
Pearson 37-2	37.42' / 11.41m	1988
Pearson 27	26.92' / 8.21m	1988
Pearson 34-2	34.50' / 10.52m	1989
Pearson 38	37.50' / 11.43m	1989
