= Pearson Triton =

Early fibreglass recreational keelboat

Development
- Designer: Carl Alberg
- Location: United States
- Year: 1958
- No. built: over 700
- Builders: Pearson Yachts; Jouët; Aeromarine Plastics

Boat
- Displacement: 6,930 lb (3,143 kg)
- Draft: 3.92 ft (1.19 m)

Hull
- Type: Monohull
- Construction: Fiberglass
- LOA: 28.33 ft (8.63 m)
- LWL: 21.50 ft (6.55 m)
- Beam: 8.25 ft (2.51 m)
- Engine: Universal Atomic 4 30 hp (22 kW) gasoline engine

Hull appendages
- Keel: long keel
- Ballast: 3,019 lb (1,369 kg)
- Rudder: keel-mounted rudder

Rig
- Rig type: Bermuda rig
- I foretriangle height: 28.50 ft (8.69 m)
- J foretriangle base: 9.80 ft (2.99 m)
- P mainsail luff: 33.00 ft (10.06 m)
- E mainsail foot: 14.00 ft (4.27 m)

Sails
- Sailplan: Fractional rigged sloop
- Mainsail area: 231.00 sq ft (21.461 m^{2})
- Jib/genoa area: 139.65 sq ft (12.974 m^{2})
- Total sail area: 370.65 sq ft (34.435 m^{2})

The Pearson Triton is a recreational keelboat and one of the first fiberglass boats, introduced at the 1959 National Boat Show in New York City. The design brief was for a 28-foot racer-cruiser boat with stand-up headroom, sleeping accommodation for a family of four and that would cost less than US$10,000. Carl Alberg designed the boat at a price of US$9,700. It launched Alberg's career as a naval architect.

It was inspired by the lines of the traditional Scandinavian Folkboat. It has a spooned raked stem, a raised transom, a keel-mounted rudder controlled by a tiller. There is an anchor locker in the bow.

It has a fractional sloop rig and was available with a yawl rig. The genoas have tracks and the mainsail can be roller reefed.

It was built by Pearson Yachts in Portsmouth, Rhode Island, United States. From 1960 Aeromarine Plastics in California built 150. It has a masthead sloop rig, and solid fiberglass decks. From 1965, Jouët in France built about 60. The deck and coach house roof were redesigned to incorporate a forward cabin windshield, a feature of many Jouët boat designs.

The galley is located on both sides of the cabin at the bottom of the companionway stairs. On the starboard side is a sink that can be covered for use as a chart table. There is also a two-burner LPG stove. The head has a door and is located forward, just aft of the double "V"-berth. Additional sleeping space is provided by two cabin berths.

The Triton was inducted into the now-defunct Sail America American Sailboat Hall of Fame, as "a classic".
