= Alberg 35 =

The Alberg 35 is a fiberglass sailboat designed by Carl Alberg. It is also known as the Pearson Alberg 35. The design was produced not only by Pearson Yachts in Rhode Island, but also by AeroMarine Composites and Ericson Yachts. It is the larger cousin of the Alberg 30 and the Pearson Triton. The Alberg 35 was the second yacht put into production by Pearson after the hugely successful Triton. In the case of Ericson, boats were produced from Pearson molds that had been salvaged by Ericson employees from a California landfill; the Alberg 35 became one of Ericson's early successes.

== Specifications ==
LOA: 34'-9"

LWL: 24'-0"

Beam: 9'-8"

Draft: 5'-2"

Ballast: 5300 lb (Lead)

Sail Area (100%): 535 sq ft (49.7 m^{2})

Displacement: 13,300 lb (6,000 kg)

PHRF Race Rating: 198
