= O'Day =

O'Day is a surname of Irish origin. Notable people with the surname include:

- Alan O'Day (1940–2013), American singer-songwriter
- Anita O'Day (1919–2006), American jazz singer
- Aubrey O'Day (born 1984), American singer, dancer, actress, songwriter, fashion designer, former member of the group Danity Kane
- Caroline Love Goodwin O'Day (1875–1943), American politician
- Constance O'Day-Flannery, an American author of romance novels
- Daniel O'Day, one of northwestern Pennsylvania's earliest independent refiners to be brought into John D. Rockefeller's Standard Oil Company
- Daniel O'Day, Chairman and Chief Executive Officer, Gilead Sciences
- Darren O'Day (born 1982), Major League Baseball relief pitcher for the Atlanta Braves. Real last name Odachowski, not Irish.
- George O'Day (1923–1987), American sailor, Olympic champion and boat designer
- Hank O'Day (1859–1935), American right-handed pitcher, umpire and manager in Major League Baseball
- Jeremy O'Day (born 1974), offensive lineman for the Saskatchewan Roughriders of the Canadian Football League
- John O'Day (various people)
- Marcus O'Day (1897–1961), American physicist
- Molly O'Day (1911–1998), American film actress
- Molly O'Day (singer) (1923–1987), American country music vocalist in the late 1940s
- Nell O'Day (1909–1989), accomplished equestrian and B-movie actress of the 1930s and 1940s
- Pat O'Day (born 1934), Pacific Northwest broadcaster and promoter

== See also ==
- Break O'Day Council, a Local Government Area of Tasmania, encompassing the northern part of the states east coast
- Javits-Wagner-O'Day Act or JWOD, 41 U.S.C. § 46 et seq
- O'Day Corp., a U.S. sailboat builder of the following sailboats:
  - O'Day 23
  - O'Day 25
  - O'Day 28
  - O'Day 30
  - O'Day Day Sailer
  - O'Day Mariner, a long sailboat based upon the hull of the Rhodes 19
- O'Day (crater), a prominent lunar impact crater that is located on the far side of the Moon
- O'Dea, Irish surname from which O'Day is derived
- Peep o' Day Boys, a Protestant secret association in 18th century Ireland, a precursor of the Orange Order
