= Widgeon (disambiguation) =

Wigeon, or Widgeon, mainly refers to a group of three duck species of the genus Anas.

It may also refer to:

- 8440 Wigeon, main belt asteroid
- Grumman Widgeon, American 1940s amphibian aircraft
- HMS Widgeon, Royal Navy schooner launched in 1806
- MV Widgeon, a United States Bureau of Fisheries and Fish and Wildlife Service fishery patrol boat of 1919–1944 that previously served in the U.S. Navy as USS Edithena (SP-624)
- Wackett Widgeon, Australian 1920s amphibious aircraft
- Westland Widgeon (helicopter), a helicopter
- Westland Widgeon (fixed wing), British 1920s civil light aircraft
- Widgeon, California, a former town in Modoc County
- USS Widgeon, the name of two U.S. Navy ships
- Widgeon 12, an American sailboat design
