= O'Day 20 =

1970s US recreational keelboat

Development
- Designer: John Deknatel
- Location: United States
- Year: 1973
- No. built: 949
- Builder: O'Day Corp.
- Role: Cruiser
- Name: O'Day 20

Boat
- Displacement: 1,750 lb (794 kg)
- Draft: 3.93 ft (1.20 m) with centerboard down

Hull
- Type: monohull
- Construction: fiberglass
- LOA: 19.58 ft (5.97 m)
- LWL: 17.25 ft (5.26 m)
- Beam: 7.00 ft (2.13 m)
- Engine: outboard motor

Hull appendages
- Keel: stub keel with centerboard
- Ballast: 400 lb (181 kg)
- Rudder: transom-mounted rudder

Rig
- Rig type: Bermuda rig
- I foretriangle height: 23.90 ft (7.28 m)
- J foretriangle base: 7.80 ft (2.38 m)
- P mainsail luff: 20.50 ft (6.25 m)
- E mainsail foot: 8.00 ft (2.44 m)

Sails
- Sailplan: masthead sloop
- Mainsail area: 82.00 sq ft (7.618 m^{2})
- Jib/genoa area: 92.82 sq ft (8.623 m^{2})
- Total sail area: 174.82 sq ft (16.241 m^{2})

Racing
- PHRF: 218

The O'Day 20 is a recreational keelboat designed by John Deknatel of C.R. Hunt & Associates, and built by O'Day Corp. in the United States from 1973 to 1979, with 949 boats completed. It is a lower cost follow-on design to the O'Day 22.

== Design ==
The boat was intended as a first cruising sailboat for an owner stepping up from a daysailer. The design put an emphasis on spaciousness and simplicity.

It is built predominantly of fiberglass, with wood trim. It has a masthead sloop rig or optional fractional rig, a raked stem, a slightly reverse transom, a transom-hung rudder controlled by a tiller and a fixed stub keel with a centerboard. It displaces 1,750 lb (794 kg) empty and carries 400 lb (181 kg) of lead ballast.

The boat has a draft of 3.92 ft (1.19 m) with the centerboard extended and 1.17 ft (0.36 m) with it retracted, allowing operation in shallow water or ground transportation on a trailer.

The boat is normally fitted with a small 3 to 6 hp (2 to 4 kW) outboard motor for docking and maneuvering.

The design has sleeping accommodation for four people, with a double "V"-berth in the bow cabin and two straight settee berths in the main cabin. The galley is located just aft of the bow cabin. The galley is equipped with a two-burner stove and a sink. The head is located in the bow cabin under the "V"-berth. Cabin headroom is 46 in (117 cm).

The design has a PHRF racing average handicap of 218 and a hull speed of 5.5 kn (10.2 km/h).

== Reception ==
In a 2010 review Steve Henkel wrote, "The O'Day 22 ... was introduced in 1972 and a year later the O'Day 20 came along. According to the yachting press of the time, the smaller O'Day 20 was a lower-priced follow-up to the similar O'Day 22. ... Best features: It is interesting to compare the O'Day 20 with her near sisterships, the O'Day 19 and 192, one longer and one shorter in LOD. For example, both these comps have more internal space than the O’Day 20. But the O'Day 20 has a slightly better Motion Index resulting from her extra 200 pounds of ballast, and slightly more speed due to her longer LWL. Worst features: Other than the above, we don't see much difference. Maybe the only really bad feature was in the higher new price..."

In a 1974 review in MotorBoating described the design as having, "four full-sized bunks, head, galley sink, icebox and optional stove make her self-sufficient away from port. A tall rig and 3'11" draft (with centerboard down) make her a lively performer under sail. Four hundred pounds of lead ballast make her safely self-righting. And her shallow draft keel (14" centerboard up) and tabernacle stepped mast make her easy to trailer."
