= C. Raymond Hunt Associates =

Boat design firm

- Company type: Privately held company
- Industry: Boat building
- Founded: 1966
- Founder: C. Raymond Hunt and John Deknatel
- Headquarters: New Bedford, Massachusetts, United States
- Key people: President: Winn Willard; Vice President: Benjamin I. Stoddard; Chairman: John H. Deknatel
- Products: Sailboat and powerboat designs
- Number of employees: nine
- Website: www.rayhuntdesign.com

C. Raymond Hunt Associates (doing business as Ray Hunt Design) is an American naval architecture design firm, based in New Bedford, Massachusetts. The company specializes in the design of fiberglass sailboats and powerboats.

The company was founded by C. Raymond Hunt and John Deknatel in 1966. Deknatel remains the chairman, while the current president is Winn Willard. In 2023 the company had seven employees.

Hunt and his firm are noted as being the only designers of that period that achieved international success in both powerboat and sailboat design.

== Founder ==
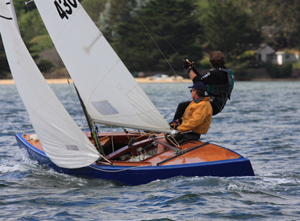
Hunt's 1939 design, the International 110

C. Raymond Hunt was born in 1908 and completed his formal education only as far as two years at Phillips Andover prep school. He had no formal training in naval architecture.

The Hunt family were members of the Duxbury Yacht Club (DYC) in Duxbury, Massachusetts in the 1920s. In 1923, Hunt was the captain of the DYC Junior Sailing Crew, leading it to victory in the 1923 Sears Cup in Marblehead, Massachusetts. This was the first sailing championship for the DYC since its establishment in 1875 and a victory over the principal yacht clubs of Massachusetts and New York. Hunt competed as captain of crews representing the DYC in the Sears Cup in 1925 and 1926, winning his second championship title in the event in 1926. Upon his successes in these competitions, Hunt was invited to tea with US President Calvin Coolidge, who at the time was vacationing in Marblehead, Massachusetts.

Hunt also won the DYC junior golf championship in 1926.

Prior to founding the firm in 1966, Hunt had already established a name by designing the Concordia yawls in 1938, the International 110 in 1939 and the 1958 America's Cup 12 Meter defender Easterner. He designed a number of 5.5 Meter sailboats, including the boats that won the 1960 Summer Olympic Games. His captained his own 5.5 meter design, Chaje II to the 1963 5.5 Meter World Championships. He also designed the Boston Whaler.

He invented the "deep vee" powerboat hull design, which uses a high-deadrise. This proved successful in offshore racing through the 1960s. The deep vee was never patented, as a small sailing magazine had published an article describing it the year before his patent application, making the design public domain.

His business partner, Deknatel, said of him, "Ray was a self-effacing, quiet guy—the antithesis of any of that snooty, yachty stuff."

Hunt died in 1978 at age 70.

== History ==
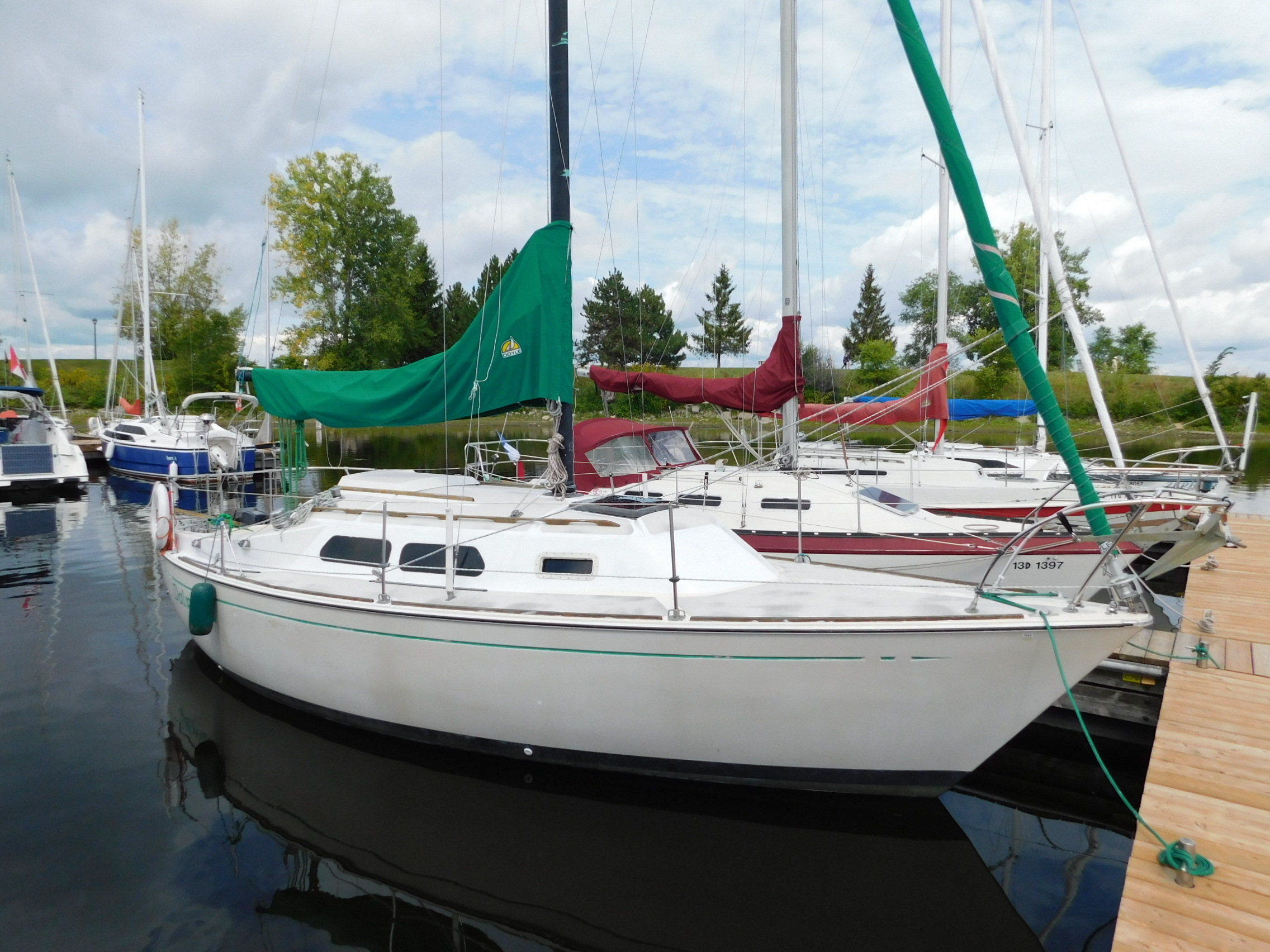
The Hunt-designed Paceship PY 26

The company was founded in 1966 by C. Raymond Hunt and John Deknatel with the concept of applying the "deep vee" hull concept to a wider range of boats. The firm started designing for the production and custom markets. Powerboat manufacturer that produced Hunt designs included Bertram, Boston Whaler, Robalo, Cruisers, Chris-Craft Corporation, 4 Winns, Southport, Grand Banks, SeaArk, Regal and Wellcraft. The company has designed all the hulls used by Grady-White Boats since the 1990s. The company also designed custom yachts for Burger, Palmer Johnson, Hinckley, Lyman-Morse, Nautor and Royal Huisman.

In the sailboat market the company did design work for Cal Yachts, O'Day Corp, Ranger Yachts and Paceship Yachts. Newspaper owner Phil Weld sailed his Hunt-designed trimaran Moxie to win the 1980 Single-Handed Trans-Atlantic Race.

In the 1970s the firm entered the commercial boat market and the military market. They produced designs for several navies, coast guards and police departments as well as for fire departments. Among his naval designs was a 34-foot patrol boat for the US Navy as well as several destroyer hull designs.

The company started its own boat building subsidiary in 1998. Called Hunt Yachts, it built high-end powerboats in the 25 to 29 ft (7.6 to 8.8 m) size range. It was building about 30 to 40 boats per year in 2013. The division was sold to Hinckley Yachts in 2013.

== Boats ==
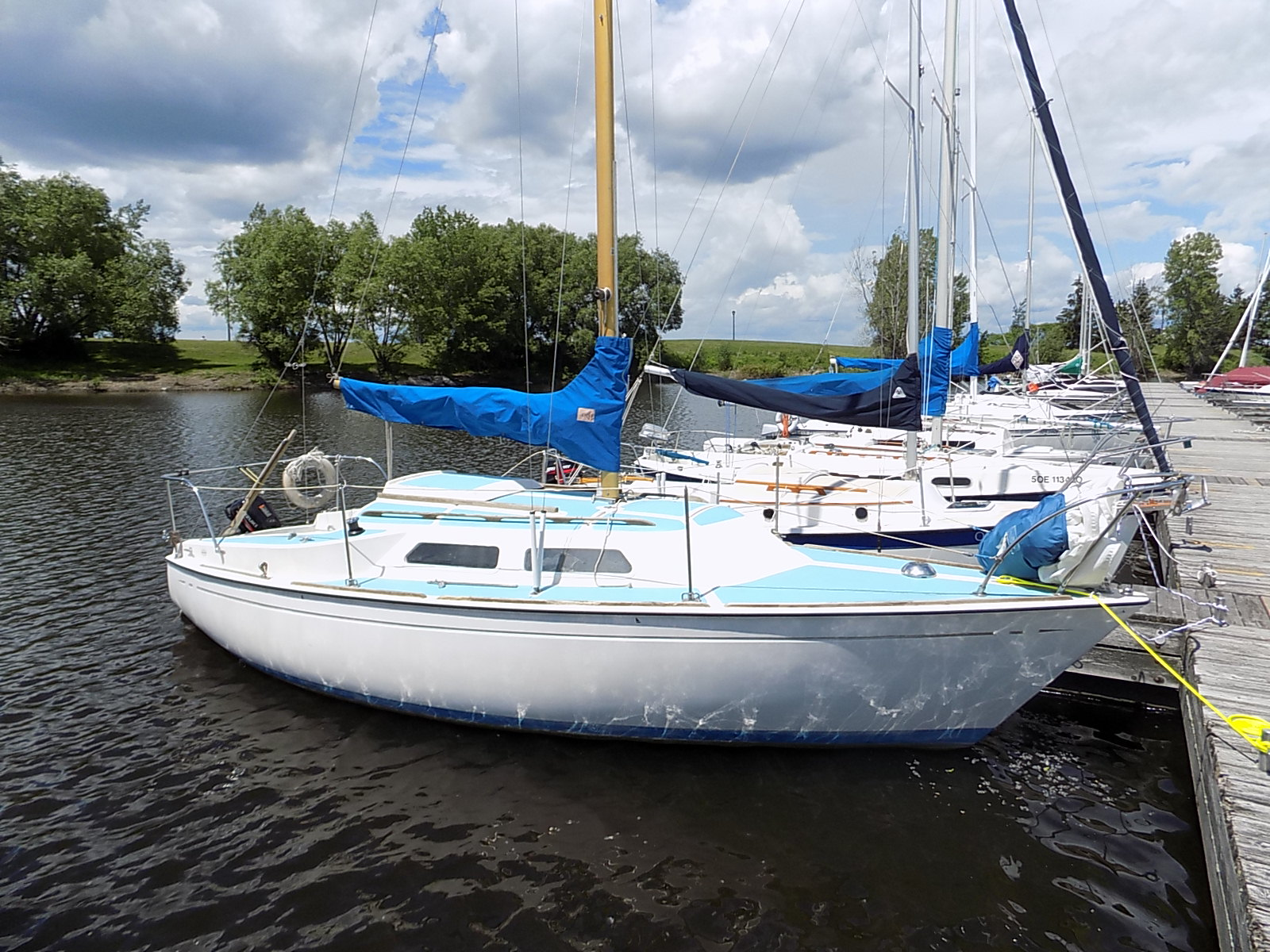
Paceship PY 23

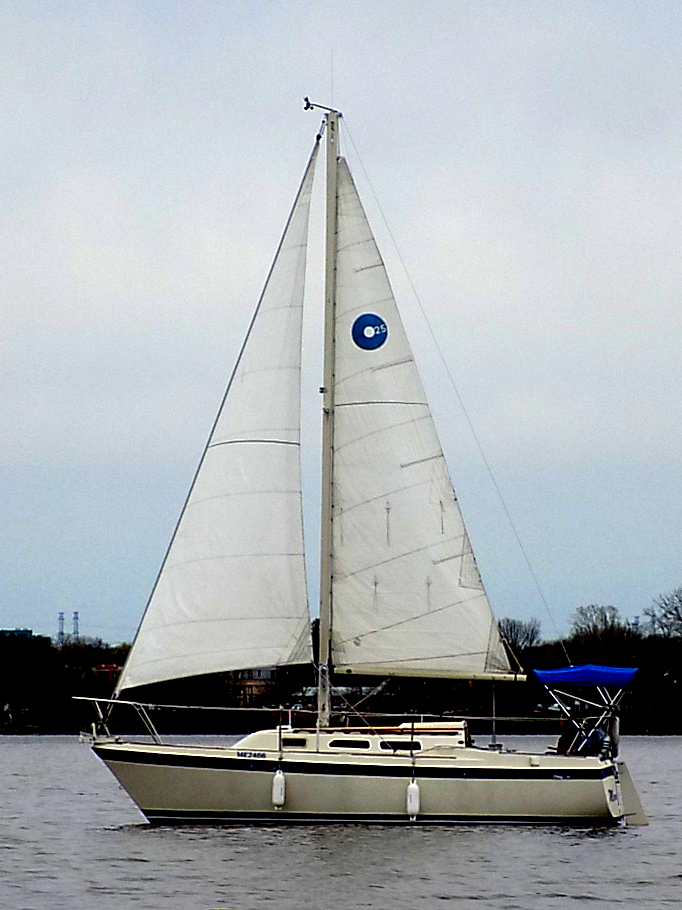
O'Day 25

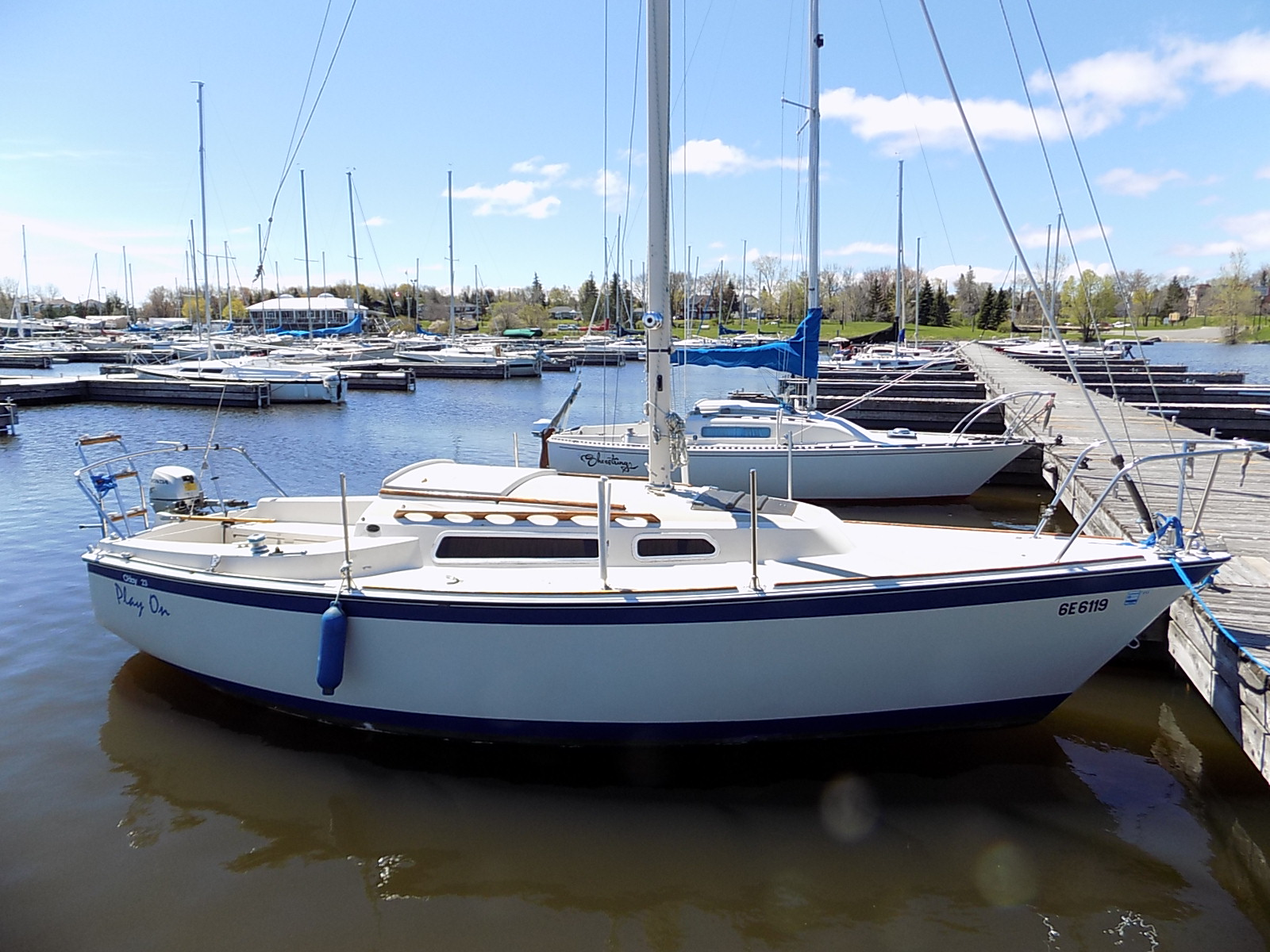
O'Day 23-2

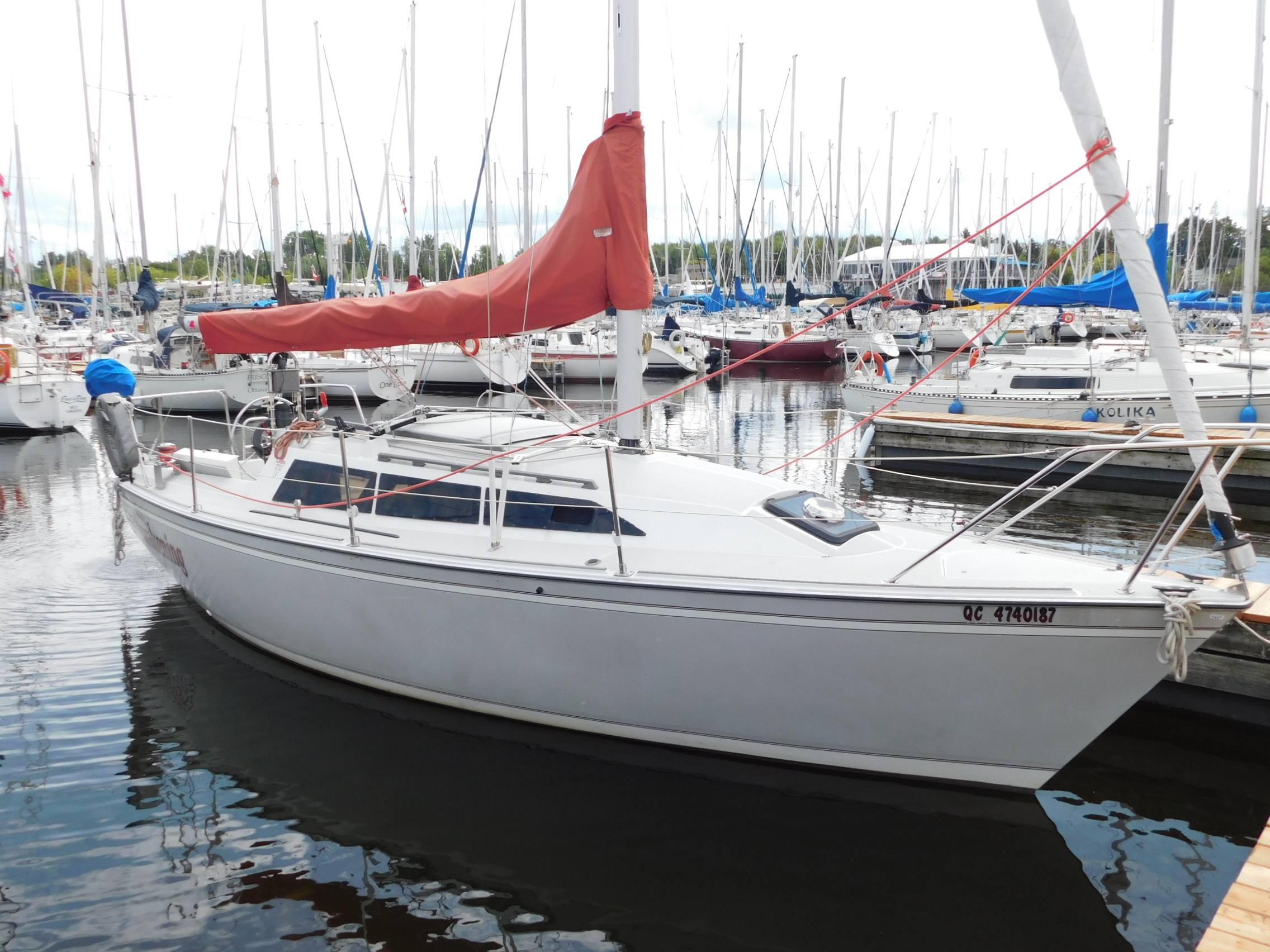
O'Day 272

Summary of boats designed by C. Raymond Hunt and C. Raymond Hunt Associates:

- Concordia 25 - 1938
- Concordia 40 - 1938
- International 110 - 1939
- International 210 - 1946
- Concordia 41 - 1957
- O'Day 22 - 1972
- O'Day 23-1 (Lift Top) - 1972
- Paceship PY 26 - 1972
- O'Day 22 MH - 1973
- O'Day 20 - 1973
- Paceship PY 23 - 1973
- O'Day 25 - 1975
- O'Day 32 - 1975
- O'Day 32 Ketch - 1975
- O'Day 30 - 1977
- O'Day 37 - 1977
- Ranger 30 - 1977
- O'Day 23-2 - 1978
- O'Day 28 - 1978
- O'Day 19 - 1979
- O'Day 34 - 1980
- Tanzer 27 - 1982
- Cal 24-3 - 1983
- O'Day 26 - 1983
- O'Day 222 - 1984
- O'Day 192 - 1984
- O'Day 35 - 1984
- Cal 22 - 1984
- Cal 33 - 1984
- Cal 44 - 1984
- O'Day 31 - 1985
- O'Day 272 - 1985
- Cal 28-2 - 1985
- O'Day 40 - 1986
- O'Day 322 - 1986
- Cal 39 (Hunt/O'Day) - 1988
- O'Day 240 - 1988
- O'Day 280 - 1988
- O'Day 302 - 1988
- O'Day 290 - 1989
- O'Day 250 - 1996

== See also ==
- List of sailboat designers and manufacturers
