= O'Day 26 =

Sailboat class

Development
- Designer: C. Raymond Hunt and Associates
- Location: United States
- Year: 1983
- No. built: 85
- Builder: O'Day Corp.
- Role: Cruiser
- Name: O'Day 26

Boat
- Displacement: 4,800 lb (2,177 kg)
- Draft: 6.00 ft (1.83 m) with centerboard down

Hull
- Type: monohull
- Construction: fiberglass
- LOA: 25.70 ft (7.83 m)
- LWL: 21.58 ft (6.58 m)
- Beam: 8.00 ft (2.44 m)
- Engine: inboard or outboard motor

Hull appendages
- Keel: stub keel with centerboard
- Ballast: 1,850 lb (839 kg)
- Rudder: transom-mounted rudder

Rig
- Rig type: Bermuda rig
- I foretriangle height: 30.00 ft (9.14 m)
- J foretriangle base: 10.33 ft (3.15 m)
- P mainsail luff: 25.00 ft (7.62 m)
- E mainsail foot: 10.00 ft (3.05 m)

Sails
- Sailplan: masthead sloop
- Mainsail area: 125.00 sq ft (11.613 m^{2})
- Jib/genoa area: 154.95 sq ft (14.395 m^{2})
- Total sail area: 279.95 sq ft (26.008 m^{2})

Racing
- PHRF: 234

The O'Day 26 is an American sailboat that was designed by C. Raymond Hunt and Associates as a cruiser and first built in 1983.

== Production ==
The design was built by O'Day Corp. in the United States between 1983 and 1985, with 85 boats completed, but it is now out of production.

== Design ==
The O'Day 26 is a recreational keelboat, built predominantly of fiberglass, with wood trim. It has a masthead sloop rig, a raked stem, a reverse transom, a transom-hung rudder controlled by a tiller and a fixed stub keel with a retractable centerboard. It displaces 4,800 lb (2,177 kg) and carries 1,850 lb (839 kg) of ballast.

The boat has a draft of 6.00 ft (1.83 m) with the centerboard extended and 2.50 ft (0.76 m) with it retracted, allowing operation in shallow water or ground transportation on a trailer.

The boat is normally fitted with a small 6 to 15 hp (4 to 11 kW) outboard motor or inboard for docking and maneuvering, with a maximum of 15 hp (11 kW) recommended. If fitted with a fixed tank, then the fuel tank holds 14 U.S. gallons (53 L; 12 imp gal) and the fresh water tank has a capacity of 20 U.S. gallons (76 L; 17 imp gal).

The design has sleeping accommodation for five people, with a double "V"-berth in the bow cabin, two straight settee berths in the main cabin and a single berth under the cockpit. The galley is located on the starboard side at the companionway ladder. The galley is L-shaped and is equipped with a two-burner stove, ice box and a sink. The head is located just aft of the bow cabin. Cabin headroom is 66 in (168 cm).

The design has a PHRF racing average handicap of 234 and a hull speed of 6.2 kn (11.5 km/h).

== Operational history ==
In a 2010 review Steve Henkel wrote, "the O'Day 26 resembles her near-sistership, the O'Day 25 ... to an extent that makes it difficult to distinguish one from the other. Both give buyers a choice of inboard or outboard power. The cabin and cockpit layouts on both are almost identical, and feature the same 5' 6" headroom. The waterline on the '26' is eleven inches longer than on the '25' ... according to O’Day, the design basis behind the O'Day 26 was 'to maximize the idea of a boat suitable for coastwise ocean sailing and over-the-road transport by a pleasure vehicle without any special size permits.' The result, O'Day says, is a boat that 'has the right stuff for easy trailer sailing.' We wonder about that, in view of the 6,900 lbs. trailering weight, requiring a specially equipped SUV with extra engine power. A 2008 Ford E-250 van with 4.6 liter V8 won't do it, but add a 5.4 liter engine and it will. Is that still considered a 'pleasure vehicle'? Best features: The O'Day 26 probably has a little more speed than her comp[etitor]s. Worst features: None noticed."

== See also ==
- List of sailing boat types
