= Javelin dinghy =

Sailboat class

Javelin
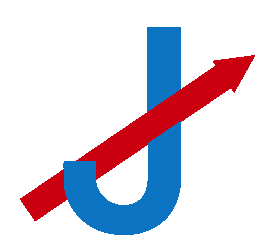
- Class symbol

Development
- Designer: Uffa Fox
- Location: United States
- Year: 1960
- No. built: 5100
- Builder: O'Day Corp.
- Role: One-design racer
- Name: Javelin

Boat
- Displacement: 475 lb (215 kg) hull weight
- Draft: 3.83 ft (1.17 m) with the centerboard down

Hull
- Type: Monohull
- Construction: Fiberglass
- LOA: 14.00 ft (4.27 m)
- LWL: 13.17 ft (4.01 m)
- Beam: 5.67 ft (1.73 m)

Hull appendages
- Keel: centerboard
- Ballast: 49 lb (22 kg) of galvanized steel
- Rudder: transom-mounted rudder

Rig
- Rig type: Bermuda rig

Sails
- Sailplan: Fractional rigged sloop
- Spinnaker area: 90 sq ft (8.4 m^{2})
- Total sail area: 125.00 sq ft (11.613 m^{2})

Racing
- D-PN: 111.8

The Javelin, also called the Javelin 14 and O'Day Javelin is an American sailing dinghy that was designed by Uffa Fox as a one-design racer and first built in 1960.

== Production ==
The design was built by O'Day Corp. in the United States. The company produced 5100 examples of the design, but it is now out of production.

== Design ==
The Javelin is a recreational sailboat, built predominantly of fiberglass, with wood trim. It has a fractional sloop rig with anodized aluminum spars, a nearly plumb stem, a vertical transom, a transom-hung, kick-up rudder controlled by a tiller and a retractable centerboard. The hull alone displaces 475 lb (215 kg) and carries 49 lb (22 kg) of galvanized steel ballast. A fixed keel model was produced in small numbers and carries 195 lb (88 kg) of iron ballast.

The boat has a draft of 3.83 ft (1.17 m) with the centerboard extended and 6 in (15 cm) with it retracted, allowing beaching or ground transportation on a trailer. The fixed keel model has a draft of 2.00 ft (0.61 m).

The boat may be fitted with a small outboard motor up to 8 hp (6 kW) for docking and maneuvering.

The design is equipped with a lockable storage compartment in the bow and gear lockers under the seats.

The design has a Portsmouth Yardstick racing average handicap of 111.8.

== Operational history ==
In a 1994 review Richard Sherwood described the design as, "a beamy, stable small day sailer. Javelin has an unusually large (nine-foot) cockpit, a gear locker under the seats, and a lockable storage compartment under the deck. She is self-bailing and self-rescuing. The transom is reinforced to take outboards up to eight horsepower."

== See also ==
- List of sailing boat types

Similar sailboats

- Javelin dinghy (Australasia)
- Javelin dinghy (Europe)
