= Concordia yawl =

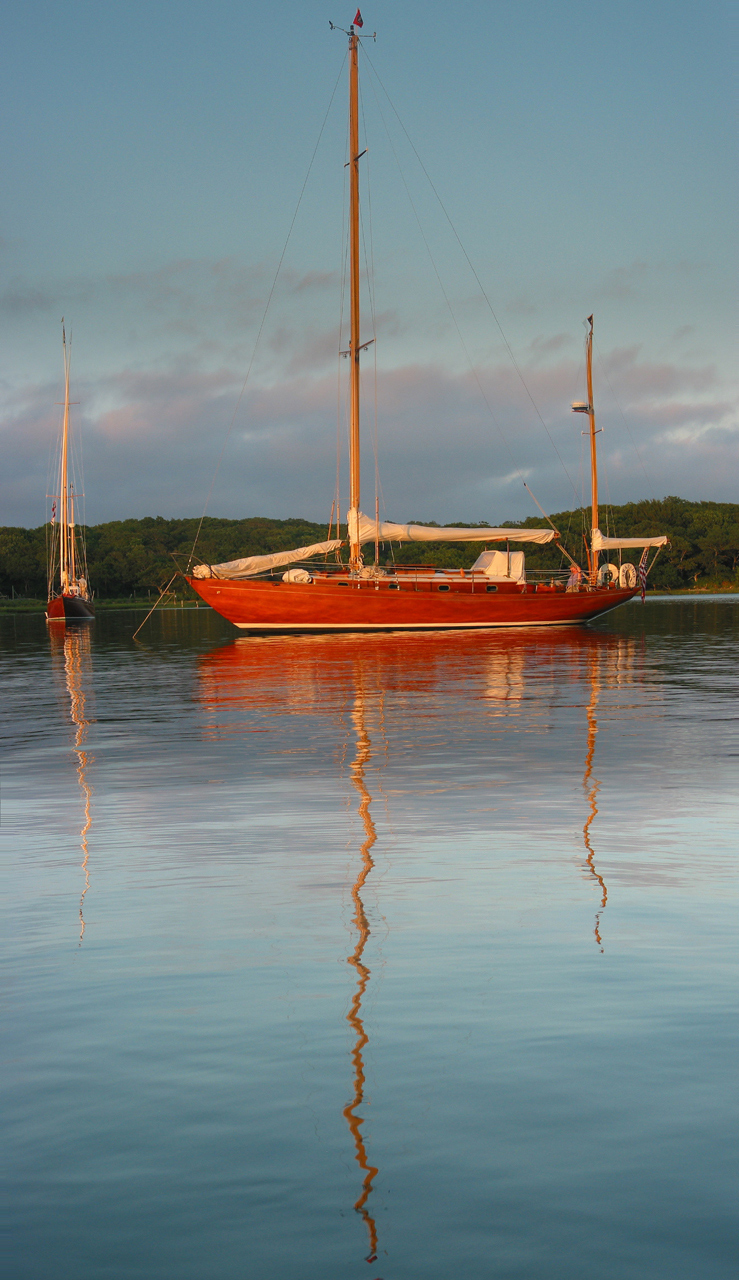
Concordia Yawls #85 Arapaho and #82 Coriolis

The Concordia yawl is a class of wooden yawl sailboats; it was designed in 1938 by the naval architect C. Raymond Hunt with input from Llewellyn and Waldo Howland, Clinton Crane, Fenwick Williams, and Frank Paine. Earlier that year, the Colin Archer-designed Norwegian pilot cutter, Escape, belonging to Llewellyn Howland's family, was destroyed by the Great Hurricane of 1938. Howland subsequently commissioned the Concordia Company, which he had founded in 1926, and at the time was run by his son Waldo, to design and build a replacement. Howland wanted a sailboat that could be used for both cruising and racing and withstand the heavy wind and choppy waters of Buzzards Bay; thus the Concordia design number fourteen, a 39'10" yawl, was created.

There were 103 Concordias produced between 1938 and 1966, making the Concordia yawl class the largest class of large one-design wooden sailboats. The first four Concordias were produced in Massachusetts. Concordia commissioned the Abeking & Rasmussen shipyard in Lemwerder, Germany, to build the remaining 99 (26 of them as a 41' Model). 102 of the 103 Concordias are still in existence today.

Over the years, the Concordia yawl has won numerous races including the prestigious Newport Bermuda Race (1954 and 1978), the Annapolis Race (1955), at Cowes Week (1955) and the Marblehead to Halifax Ocean Race (1955 and 1997).

- 1954 Newport Bermuda Race - Malay, Concordia #2, Dan Strohmeier
- 1955 Annapolis Race - Actaea, Concordia #17, Henry Sears
- 1955 Cowes Week - Harrier, Concordia #30, Ray Hunt
- 1955 Marblehead-to-Halifax Race - Malay, Concordia #2, Dan Strohmeier.
- 1978 Newport Bermuda Race - Babe, Concordia #26, Arnold Gay
- 1997 Marblehead-to-Halifax Race - Crocodile, Concordia #67, Robert Crocker.

The Concordia yawls Arapaho, hull #85 and Irian, hull #70 (both 41' models), appeared in the movie Message in a Bottle.

== Concordia yawl specifications ==
Specification	Measurement
Length overall	39'-10"
Length waterline	28'-6"
Beam (extreme)	10'-3"
Draft	5'-8"
Ballast (iron keel)	7700 lbs.
Displacement	18,000 lbs.
Sail area (fore triangle, mainsail and mizzen)	690 sq ft (64 m^{2}).

- Construction - oak keel, steam-bent laminated oak frames, African mahogany planking, bright mahogany deck trim, canvas-covered main deck and house top, bronze plank fastenings, galvanized iron keel bolts
- Rig - hollow spars, including spinnaker pole, stainless steel rigging, galvanized tangs, bronze fittings and winches
- Sails - mainsail, mizzen and jib, Dacron; running rigging, Dacron
- Engine - Gray 4 cyl. 31 H.P., cockpit controls
- Propeller - 2-blade solid on centerline
- Plumbing and tanks - toilet and lavatory with pump in wash room, sink and pump in galley, built-in bilge pump; three Nirosta water tanks of approximately 60 US gallons (230 L) total capacity; one 20-US-gallon (76 L) Nirosta gasoline tank
- Cabin equipment - 2 special folding berths forward, 2 Concordia berths in main cabin, transom cushions, Kapoc berth mattresses, cabin table, ice box of 75 lbs capacity, alcohol stove 7 electric lights, 1 kerosene lamp, panelled pine bulkheads, locust trim
- Other equipment - electric running and riding lights, anchor and warp, boat hook, flag staff, canvas bucket, mop, few tools, fenders, life ring, dock lines, compass and binnacle, life lines, pulpit dinghy chocks, hatch and skylight covers
