= O'Day 240 =

Sailboat class

Development
- Designer: C.R. Hunt & Associates
- Location: United States
- Year: 1988
- Builder: O'Day Corp.
- Role: Cruiser
- Name: O'Day 240

Boat
- Displacement: 3,600 lb (1,633 kg)
- Draft: 2.67 ft (0.81 m)

Hull
- Type: monohull
- Construction: fiberglass
- LOA: 24.58 ft (7.49 m)
- LWL: 20.83 ft (6.35 m)
- Beam: 8.25 ft (2.51 m)
- Engine: outboard motor

Hull appendages
- Keel: wing keel
- Ballast: 1,200 lb (544 kg)
- Rudder: transom-mounted rudder

Rig
- Rig type: Bermuda rig
- I foretriangle height: 29.25 ft (8.92 m)
- J foretriangle base: 9.00 ft (2.74 m)
- P mainsail luff: 24.08 ft (7.34 m)
- E mainsail foot: 9.75 ft (2.97 m)

Sails
- Sailplan: masthead sloop
- Mainsail area: 117.39 sq ft (10.906 m^{2})
- Jib/genoa area: 131.63 sq ft (12.229 m^{2})
- Total sail area: 249.02 sq ft (23.135 m^{2})

Racing
- PHRF: 231

The O'Day 240 is a recreational keelboat designed by C.R. Hunt & Associates and built by O'Day Corp. in the United States from 1988 until 1989.

The O'Day 240 design was developed into the similar O'Day 250 in 1996.

== Design ==
The O'Day 240 is a recreational keelboat, built predominantly of fiberglass, with wood trim. It has a masthead sloop rig, a raked stem, a plumb transom, a transom-hung rudder controlled by a tiller and a fixed wing keel. It displaces 3,600 lb (1,633 kg) and carries 1,200 lb (544 kg) of ballast.

The boat has a draft of 2.67 ft (0.81 m) with the standard wing keel.

The boat is normally fitted with a small 3 to 6 hp (2 to 4 kW) outboard motor for docking and maneuvering.

The design has sleeping accommodation for four people, with a double "V"-berth in the bow cabin and an aft cabin with a double berth on the starboard side. It also has two straight settees in the main cabin. The galley is located on the starboard side just forward of the companionway ladder. The galley is L-shaped and is equipped with a two-burner stove, an ice box and a sink. The head is located opposite the galley on the port side. Cabin headroom is 69 in (175 cm) and the fresh water tank has a capacity of 12 U.S. gallons (45 L; 10.0 imp gal).

The design has a PHRF racing average handicap of 231 and a hull speed of 6.1 kn (11.3 km/h).

== Reception ==
In a 2010 review Steve Henkel wrote, "every year Sailing World magazine runs a Boat of the Year contest in which they pick a new sailboat from each of several categories. In the quarter century since the contest began only five monohull sailboats ... under 26 feet and with cruising accommodations—have been selected as winners. The O'Day 240 ... was the 1989 winner—the same year that O'Day, to the regret of many, ended their long participation in the sailboat market. Among the judges' comments: the 240's heavy weight and her long waterline for her size will give her 'punch and range that's often lacking in weekender/cruisers.' They also liked her enclosed head, large cockpit locker, and working galley, admired her sleek look, and felt sail and engine controls were within easy reach. Best features: We second the Sailing World comments. We also note that compared to her comp[etitor]s, the 240 has the most headroom and the largest Space Index. Also, the boat's winged keel affords shallow draft for gunkholing while giving sailing performance in the same general range as a deeper fin. Worst features: Compared to her comp[etitor]s, the 240 has the lowest Motion Index."
