= Cal 22 =

Sailboat class

Development
- Designer: C. R. Hunt Associates
- Location: United States
- Year: 1984
- Builder: Cal Boats
- Role: Cruiser
- Name: Cal 22

Boat
- Displacement: 2,100 lb (953 kg)
- Draft: 3.50 ft (1.07 m)

Hull
- Type: monohull
- Construction: fiberglass
- LOA: 22.00 ft (6.71 m)
- LWL: 19.50 ft (5.94 m)
- Beam: 7.75 ft (2.36 m)
- Engine: outboard motor

Hull appendages
- Keel: fin keel
- Ballast: 775 lb (352 kg)
- Rudder: transom-mounted rudder

Rig
- Rig type: Bermuda rig
- I foretriangle height: 24.60 ft (7.50 m)
- J foretriangle base: 8.40 ft (2.56 m)
- P mainsail luff: 25.80 ft (7.86 m)
- E mainsail foot: 9.30 ft (2.83 m)

Sails
- Sailplan: fractional rigged sloop
- Mainsail area: 119.97 sq ft (11.146 m^{2})
- Jib/genoa area: 103.32 sq ft (9.599 m^{2})
- Total sail area: 223.29 sq ft (20.744 m^{2})

Racing
- PHRF: 234

The Cal 22 is an American trailerable sailboat that was designed by C. R. Hunt Associates as a cruiser and first built in 1984.

== Production ==
The design was built by Cal Boats in the United States between 1984 and 1997, but it is now out of production. Cal Boats was a brand of Jensen Marine, which was owned by the Bangor Punta Corporation, itself owned by Lear Siegler.

== Design ==
The Cal 22 is a recreational keelboat, built predominantly of fiberglass, with wood trim. It has a fractional sloop or optional masthead sloop rig, a raked stem, a vertical transom, a transom-hung rudder controlled by a tiller and a fixed fin keel or optional shoal draft keel.

The boat is normally fitted with a small 3 to 6 hp (2 to 4 kW) outboard motor for docking and maneuvering.

The design has sleeping accommodation for four people, with a double "V"-berth in the bow cabin and two straight settee quarter berths in the main cabin. The galley is located on the port side just aft of the bow cabin. The galley is equipped with a two-burner stove and a sink. The head is located under the bow cabin berth. Cabin headroom is 54 in (140 cm) and the fresh water tank has a capacity of 5 U.S. gallons (19 L; 4.2 imp gal).

For sailing downwind the design may be equipped with a spinnaker.

The design has a PHRF racing average handicap of 234 and a hull speed of 5.9 kn (10.9 km/h).

== Variants ==
Cal 22 Fin Keel
This model displaces 2,100 lb (953 kg) and carries 775 lb (352 kg) of ballast. The boat has a draft of 3.50 ft (1.07 m) with the standard fin keel.
Cal 22 Shoal Draft
This model displaces 2,275 lb (1,032 kg) and carries 925 lb (420 kg) of ballast. The boat has a draft of 2.83 ft (0.86 m) with the shoal draft fin keel.

== Operational history ==
In a 2010 review Steve Henkel wrote, "best features: The deck layout is admirably simple, with all lines led to cockpit. Worst features: The Cal 22 came with either a deep (3' 5") or shoal (2' 10") fin keel. The deep keel doesn't match the performance of the Capri 22, a comp[etitor], as is evidenced in the PHRF ratings The shoal-draft version is too shallow to sail adequately upwind, and too deep to make launching as easy as, say the swing keel Beneteau First 235. Headroom and space are better in the Beneteau, too. Altogether, judged against her comp[etitor]s, the Cal does not shine."

== See also ==
- List of sailing boat types
