= O'Day 302 =

Sailboat class

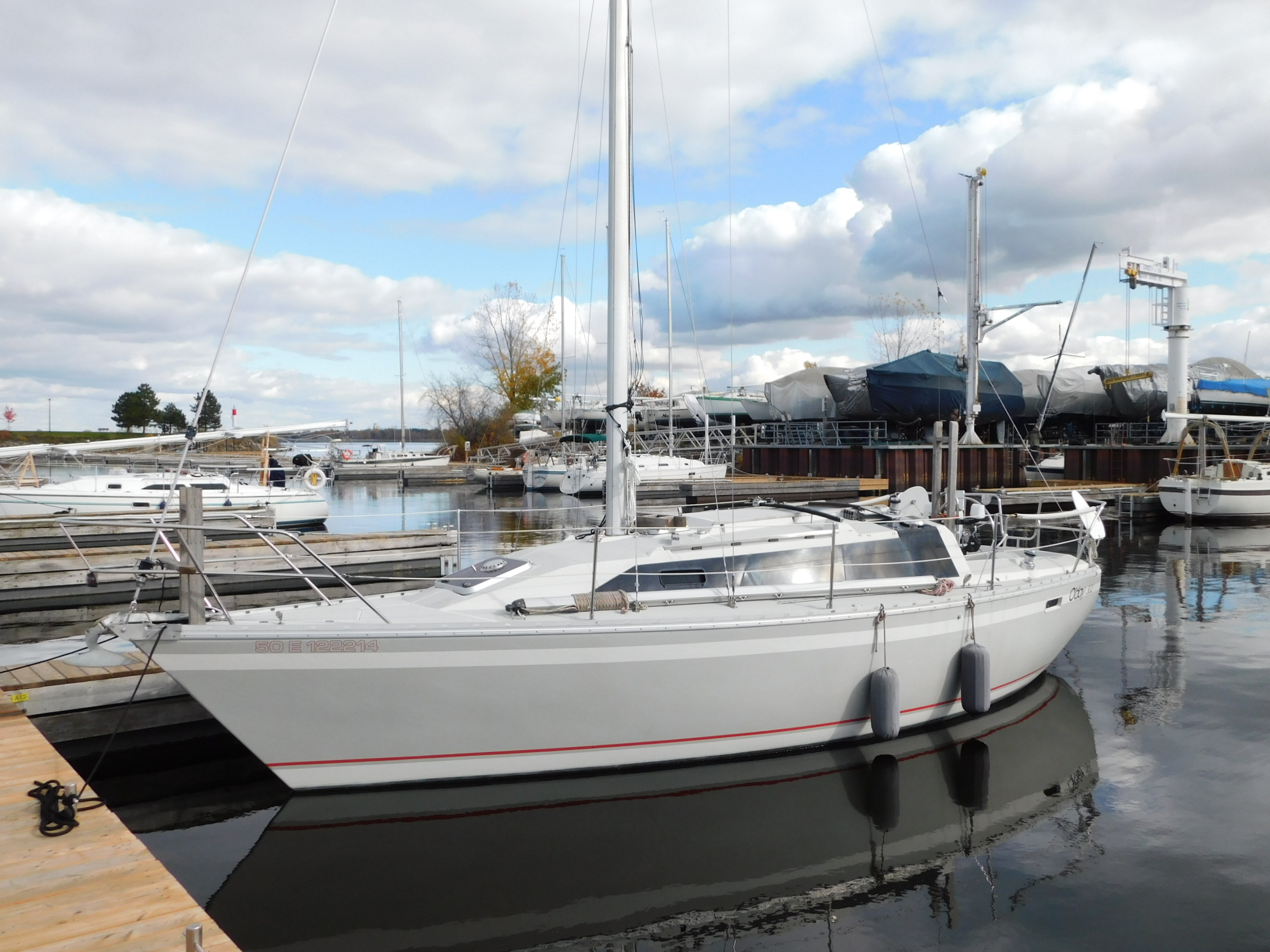

Development
- Designer: C. Raymond Hunt Associates
- Location: United States
- Year: 1988
- Builder: O'Day Corp.
- Role: Cruiser
- Name: O'Day 302

Boat
- Displacement: 7,200 lb (3,266 kg)
- Draft: 3.92 ft (1.19 m)

Hull
- Type: monohull
- Construction: fiberglass
- LOA: 29.58 ft (9.02 m)
- LWL: 24.17 ft (7.37 m)
- Beam: 10.75 ft (3.28 m)
- Engine: Yanmar 2GMF 18 hp (13 kW) diesel engine

Hull appendages
- Keel: fin keel
- Ballast: 2,400 lb (1,089 kg)
- Rudder: internally-mounted spade-type rudder

Rig
- Rig type: Bermuda rig
- I foretriangle height: 36.00 ft (10.97 m)
- J foretriangle base: 11.25 ft (3.43 m)
- P mainsail luff: 30.50 ft (9.30 m)
- E mainsail foot: 11.25 ft (3.43 m)

Sails
- Sailplan: masthead sloop
- Mainsail area: 171.56 sq ft (15.938 m^{2})
- Jib/genoa area: 202.50 sq ft (18.813 m^{2})
- Total sail area: 374.06 sq ft (34.751 m^{2})

The O'Day 302 is an American sailboat that was designed by C. Raymond Hunt Associates as a cruiser and first built in 1988.

== Production ==
The design was built by the O'Day Corporation, a division of Bangor Punta, in the United States, from 1988 to 1989, but it is now out of production. The design was one of the last put into production by O'Day before it went out of business in 1989. The molds were sold to Cal Yachts/Pearson Yachts and a few more boats were completed before the molds were moved to an O'Day affiliate in Japan.

== Design ==
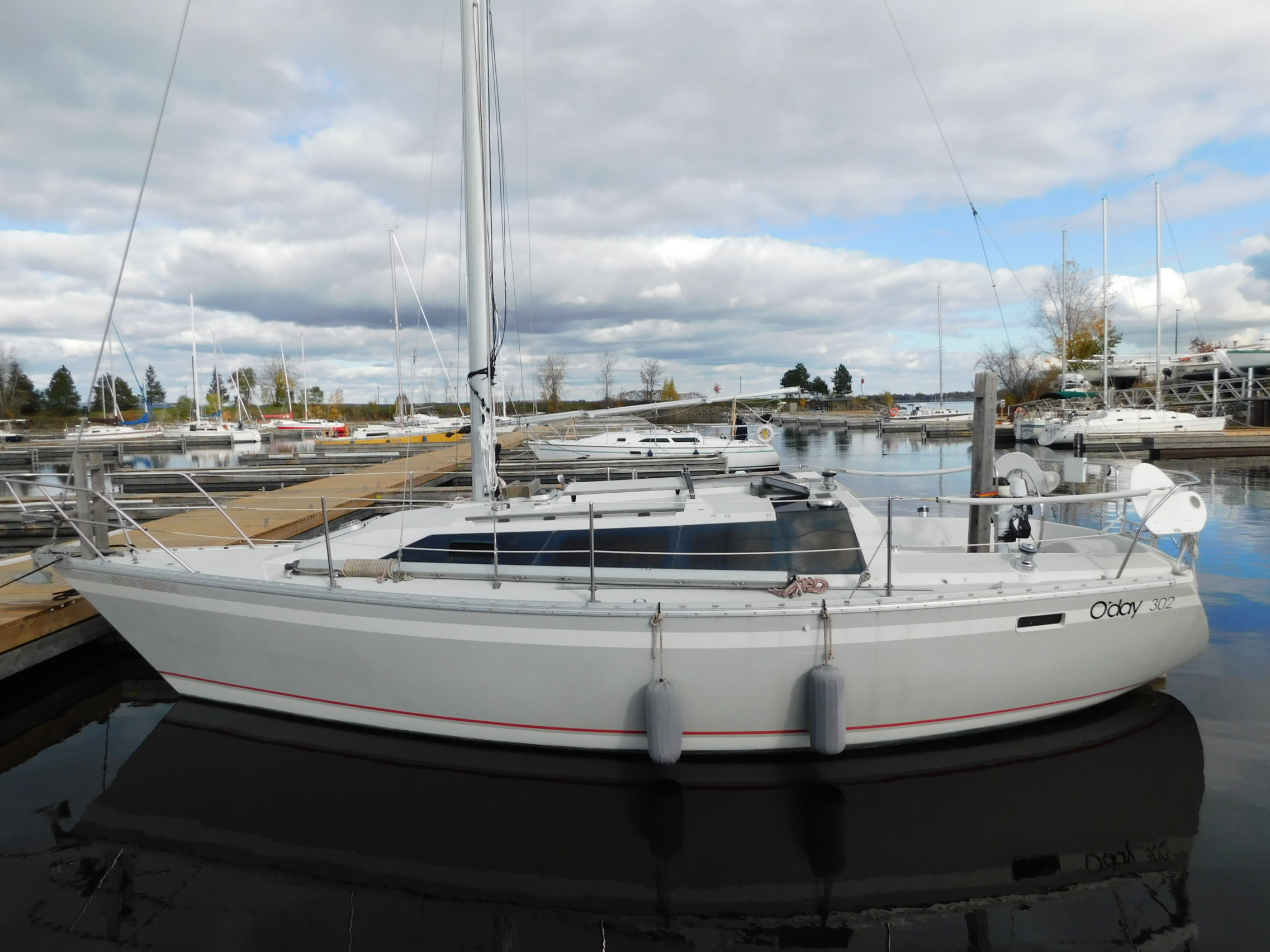
O'Day 302

The O'Day 302 is a recreational keelboat, built predominantly of fiberglass. It has a masthead sloop rig, with a fully-battened mainsail, a raked stem, a reverse transom, an internally mounted spade-type rudder controlled by a wheel and a fixed wing keel. It displaces 7,200 lb (3,266 kg) and carries 2,400 lb (1,089 kg) of ballast.

The boat has a draft of 3.92 ft (1.19 m) with the standard wing keel.

The boat is fitted with a Japanese Yanmar 2GMF diesel engine of 18 hp (13 kW) for docking and maneuvering. The fuel tank holds 24 U.S. gallons (91 L; 20 imp gal) and the fresh water tank has a capacity of 30 U.S. gallons (110 L; 25 imp gal).

The design has sleeping accommodation for six people, with a double "V"-berth in the bow cabin, two settees in the main cabin and an aft cabin with a double berth. The galley is located on the port side just forward of the companionway ladder. The galley is equipped with a two-burner propane stove and a sink with pressurized hot and cold water. The head includes a sink and vanity.

== Operational history ==
A 1987 review in Motor Boating and Sailing reported, "large sweeping expanses of plexiglas and a half dozen opening hatches and ports give the new O'Day 302 a bright, airy interior. To give the boat better performance O'Day added a new, patented winged keel which is said to provide a smoother, more comfortable ride in a seaway. And the 302 also comes equipped with a filly battened mainsail which is less sensitive to trim, and holds its shape better in light air."

== See also ==
- List of sailing boat types
