= O'Day 19 =

1979–1982 US recreational keelboat

Development
- Designer: C. Raymond Hunt Associates
- Location: United States
- Year: 1979
- No. built: 525
- Builder: O'Day Corp.
- Role: Racer-Cruiser
- Name: O'Day 19

Boat
- Displacement: 1,400 lb (635 kg)
- Draft: 4.33 ft (1.32 m)

Hull
- Type: monohull
- Construction: fiberglass
- LOA: 19.00 ft (5.79 m)
- LWL: 16.67 ft (5.08 m)
- Beam: 7.75 ft (2.36 m)
- Engine: outboard motor

Hull appendages
- Keel: stub keel and centerboard
- Ballast: 300 lb (136 kg)
- Rudder: transom-mounted rudder

Rig
- Rig type: Bermuda rig
- I foretriangle height: 22.00 ft (6.71 m)
- J foretriangle base: 7.00 ft (2.13 m)
- P mainsail luff: 24.50 ft (7.47 m)
- E mainsail foot: 8.30 ft (2.53 m)

Sails
- Sailplan: fractional rigged sloop
- Mainsail area: 101.68 sq ft (9.446 m^{2})
- Jib/genoa area: 77.00 sq ft (7.154 m^{2})
- Total sail area: 178.68 sq ft (16.600 m^{2})

Racing
- PHRF: 218

The O'Day 19 is a recreational keelboat designed by John Deknatel of C. Raymond Hunt Associates built by the O'Day Corp. in the United States from 1979 to 1982. It was replaced by the O'Day 192 in the company's product line.

== Design ==
The O'Day 19 is a recreational sailboat with a fixed stub keel and a centerboard, built predominantly of fiberglass. It has a fractional sloop rig, a raked stem, a slightly reverse transom, and a transom-hung rudder controlled by a tiller. It displaces 1,400 lb (635 kg) empty and carries 300 lb (136 kg) of ballast, of which 52 lb (24 kg) is the centerboard weight.

The boat has a draft of 4.33 ft (1.32 m) with the centerboard extended and 1.00 ft (0.30 m) with it retracted, allowing operation in shallow water or ground transportation on a trailer.

The boat is normally fitted with a small 3 to 5 hp (2 to 4 kW) outboard motor for docking and maneuvering.

The design has sleeping accommodation for two people, with a double "V"-berth in the bow. The galley is located on the port side just forward of the companionway ladder. The galley is equipped with an ice box. The head is located at the companionway on the starboard. Cabin headroom is 46 in (117 cm).

The design has a PHRF racing average handicap of 218 and a hull speed of 5.5 kn (10.2 km/h).

== Operational history ==
In a 2010 review Steve Henkel wrote, "... these little shallow-draft racer-cruisers were built in the three years ending in 1982. O'Day may have hoped that they could start some fleets for one-design club racing, but the boat is probably a bit too small for that purpose, given her relatively short cockpit and lack of buoyancy aft (insufficit to support much crew weight). Best features: The O'Day 19's high-aspect-ratio rig and centerboard, low wetted surface, and light weight should make her fast in light air—assuming a small crew. Worst features: the O'Day’s average PHRF of around 218 compared to much higher numbers for her comp[etitor]s would indicate that she is a faster boat. This might be the case in light air with a small crew, or in heavy air if the skipper piles plenty of beef along the rail. Otherwise her relatively light ballast (300 lbs compared with up to 400 for her comp[etitor]s) installed high in the boat would cause her to be too tender to be fast in all conditions. Other faults include an awkward mainsheet lead (with no traveler to keep the boom in close in a breeze) and a rudder whose bottom is lower than the keel with board up (asking for trouble in shoal waters)."
