= Tempest 23 =

1960s American recreational keelboat

Development
- Designer: Philip Rhodes and Richard D. Carlson
- Location: United States
- Year: 1964
- No. built: 390
- Builder: O'Day Corp.
- Name: Tempest 23

Boat
- Displacement: 3,000 lb (1,361 kg)
- Draft: 3.67 ft (1.12 m)

Hull
- Type: monohull
- Construction: fiberglass
- LOA: 23.17 ft (7.06 m)
- LWL: 17.00 ft (5.18 m)
- Beam: 7.67 ft (2.34 m)
- Engine: outboard motor

Hull appendages
- Keel: fin keel
- Ballast: 1,250 lb (567 kg)
- Rudder: skeg-mounted rudder

Rig
- Rig type: Bermuda rig
- I foretriangle height: 26.15 ft (7.97 m)
- J foretriangle base: 8.65 ft (2.64 m)
- P mainsail luff: 23.00 ft (7.01 m)
- E mainsail foot: 10.00 ft (3.05 m)

Sails
- Sailplan: masthead sloop
- Mainsail area: 115.00 sq ft (10.684 m^{2})
- Jib/genoa area: 113.10 sq ft (10.507 m^{2})
- Spinnaker area: 339.00 sq ft (31.494 m^{2})
- Total sail area: 228 sq ft (21.2 m^{2})

Racing
- PHRF: 258

The Tempest 23 is a recreational keelboat built by the O'Day Corp. in the United States from 1964 to 1968, with 390 boats built.

The fiberglass hull has a raised counter, angled transom; and a skeg-mounted rudder controlled by a tiller. It has a hull speed of 5.5 kn (10.2 km/h).

It is a masthead sloop. The sail plan consists of a 115.00 sq. ft. mainsail, 113.10 sq. ft. jib and 339.00 sq. ft. spinnaker. It can be sailed with a Tri-radial headsail.

It has two berths in the "V"-berth. The galley is on the port side just forward of the companionway ladder. The galley is equipped with a two-burner stove. The head is opposite the galley on the starboard side. Cabin headroom is 48 in (122 cm).

== Reception ==
In a 2010 review Steve Henkel wrote, "the O'Day Tempest 23 (not to be confused with the similarly named O'Day International Tempest, an open-cockpit racing machine) is a classic, attractive, and wholesome design for basic overnight cruising. Best features: Relatively long overhangs and low freeboard give this boat a sleek, graceful look typical of Philip Rhodes' designs. Flotation under cockpit sole and V-berth is a good safety feature. Her broader beam and deeper draft compared to the Cape Cod Marlin ... help to make her more weatherly and stiff, despite the Marlin’s heavier but closer-to-the-surface ballast. On the other hand, the two Pearson comp[etitors]s [the Pearson 23 Sloop and Pearson 23 Cat] surpass the Tempest in weatherliness and stiffness for the same reasons. Worst features: Her keel is iron rather than lead, requiring diligent maintenance to prevent deterioration from rust. Lack of a good place to put a portable cooler keeps her from qualifying as more than a basic overnighter, and overall space below is less than all her comp[etitor]s, partly due to her reduced headroom. She is known to sail slower than her PHRF rating,"
