= O'Day 192 =

1980s-90s US trailer sailer

Development
- Designer: C. Raymond Hunt Associates
- Location: United States
- Year: 1984
- Builder: O'Day Corp.
- Role: Cruiser
- Name: O'Day 192

Boat
- Displacement: 1,400 lb (635 kg)
- Draft: 4.17 ft (1.27 m)

Hull
- Type: monohull
- Construction: fiberglass
- LOA: 18.58 ft (5.66 m)
- LWL: 16.67 ft (5.08 m)
- Beam: 7.08 ft (2.16 m)
- Engine: outboard motor

Hull appendages
- Keel: fin keel
- Ballast: 400 lb (181 kg)
- Rudder: transom-mounted rudder

Rig
- Rig type: Bermuda rig
- I foretriangle height: 19.50 ft (5.94 m)
- J foretriangle base: 6.17 ft (1.88 m)
- P mainsail luff: 21.25 ft (6.48 m)
- E mainsail foot: 8.50 ft (2.59 m)

Sails
- Sailplan: fractional rigged sloop
- Mainsail area: 90.31 sq ft (8.390 m^{2})
- Jib/genoa area: 60.16 sq ft (5.589 m^{2})
- Total sail area: 150.47 sq ft (13.979 m^{2})

Racing
- PHRF: 270

The O'Day 192 is a recreational keelboat designed by John Deknatel of C. Raymond Hunt Associates built from 1984 to 1997. It replaced the O'Day 19 in the company's product line. It was built by O'Day Corp. as part of Lear Siegler, in the United States.

== Design ==
The O'Day 192 is a recreational keelboat, built predominantly of fiberglass, with wood trim. It has a fractional sloop rig, a raked stem, a slightly reverse transom, a transom-hung rudder controlled by a tiller and a fixed stub keel with a retractable centerboard. It displaces 1,400 lb (635 kg) and carries 400 lb (181 kg) of lead ballast.

The boat has a draft of 4.17 ft (1.27 m) with the centerboard extended and 1.42 ft (0.43 m) with it retracted, allowing operation in shallow water or ground transportation on a trailer.

The boat is normally fitted with a small 3 to 6 hp (2 to 4 kW) outboard motor for docking and maneuvering.

The design has sleeping accommodation for four people, with a double "V"-berth in the bow cabin and two straight quarter berths in the main cabin. There is an ice box that can be stowed under the companionway ladder. The head is located in the bow cabin under the "V"-berth. Cabin headroom is 48 in (122 cm).

The design has a PHRF racing average handicap of 270 and a hull speed of 5.5 kn (10.2 km/h).

== Reception ==
In a 2010 review Steve Henkel wrote, "the O'Day 192 is a nicely finished update of the O'Day 19. With limited interior space (just room for a child-sized V-berth and two adult-sized quarter berths), the designers decided against including room for a galley, though they did find space for a chemical head beneath the V-berth and an ice chest in the companionway. The low quarter berths have 4' 0" sitting headroom, reduced to 3' 4" over the cushion atop the toilet. Best features: The finish and construction is very good, above and below decks. The comfortable, angled seating in the cockpit and the effective, no-slip non-skid in the cockpit and on deck are also big pluses. Schaefer roller furling is standard, which is a plus, but the jib is sheeted through fixed jib blocks, which limits control of the size and shape of the sail. Worst features: Sail controls are too few and too simple. The 3-to-1 mainsheet attached to the backstay is awkward to release in moderate or strong winds. We'd add a vang, rerig the mainsheet to a block on the cockpit sole, and install jibsheet tracks along the rail."
