= O'Day 222 =

Sailboat class

Development
- Designer: C. Raymond Hunt Associates
- Location: United States
- Year: 1984
- No. built: 130
- Builder: O'Day Corp.
- Role: Cruiser
- Name: O'Day 222

Boat
- Displacement: 2,200 lb (998 kg)
- Draft: 4.67 ft (1.42 m) with the centerboard down

Hull
- Type: monohull
- Construction: fiberglass
- LOA: 21.75 ft (6.63 m)
- LWL: 19.58 ft (5.97 m)
- Beam: 7.92 ft (2.41 m)
- Engine: outboard motor

Hull appendages
- Keel: stub keel and centerboard
- Ballast: 800 lb (363 kg)
- Rudder: transom-mounted rudder

Rig
- Rig type: Bermuda rig
- I foretriangle height: 22.75 ft (6.93 m)
- J foretriangle base: 7.75 ft (2.36 m)
- P mainsail luff: 23.75 ft (7.24 m)
- E mainsail foot: 10.00 ft (3.05 m)

Sails
- Sailplan: fractional rigged sloop
- Mainsail area: 118.75 sq ft (11.032 m^{2})
- Jib/genoa area: 88.16 sq ft (8.190 m^{2})
- Total sail area: 206.91 sq ft (19.223 m^{2})

Racing
- PHRF: 258

The O'Day 222 is a recreational keelboat that was designed by C. Raymond Hunt Associates built by O'Day Corp. in the United States. A total of 130 boats were built between 1984 and 1988.

The O'Day 222 replaced the O'Day 22 in the company product line.

== Design ==
The O'Day 222 is a recreational keelboat, built predominantly of fiberglass, with wood trim. It has a fractional sloop rig, a raked stem, a plumb transom, a transom-hung rudder controlled by a tiller and a fixed stub keel with a retractable centerboard. It displaces 2,200 lb (998 kg) and carries 800 lb (363 kg) of ballast.

The boat has a draft of 4.67 ft (1.42 m) with the centerboard extended and 1.67 ft (0.51 m) with it retracted, allowing operation in shallow water or ground transportation on a trailer.

The boat is normally fitted with a small 3 to 6 hp (2 to 4 kW) outboard motor for docking and maneuvering.

The design has sleeping accommodation for four people, with a double "V"-berth in the bow cabin and two straight settee berths in the main cabin. The galley is located on the starboard side just aft of the bow cabin. The galley is equipped with a two-burner stove and a sink. A cooler maybe stowed under the companionway. The head is located under the bow cabin "V"-berth. Cabin headroom is 49 in (124 cm). The fresh water tank has a capacity of 5 U.S. gallons (19 L; 4.2 imp gal).

The design has a PHRF racing average handicap of 258 and a hull speed of 5.9 kn (10.9 km/h).

== Reception ==
In a 2010 review Steve Henkel wrote, "The 21- and 22-foot size range is a good length of boat for newish sailors starting out or those moving up from a beach boat or small daysailer. The O'Day 222 ... is a follow-on to the popular O'Day 22 ... The 222 has a deeper board-up draft, but also a deeper board-down draft, which improves upwind performance. Best features: The O'Day 222's size and modest sailplan and masthead rig make her relatively simple to sail. Worst features: Her Space Index is lowest of the comp group, as is her headroom. Beware, big and tall people. Her outboard is mounted on her transom, a long way from the helmsman’s control. The mainsheet, led aft to the transom, can become entangled with the outboard under certain conditions; some owners have installed a traveler in the forward end of the cockpit to eliminate this problem. The O'Day 222's rudder was made in a sandwich of two fiberglass skins with foam in between. Owners report their rudders are easily broken (e.g., carried away for the same reason as the O'Day 22's rudder). Chainplates also seem to be a weak point, and bear frequent inspection."
