= O'Day 23 =

1970s US recreational keelboat

O'Day 23-2
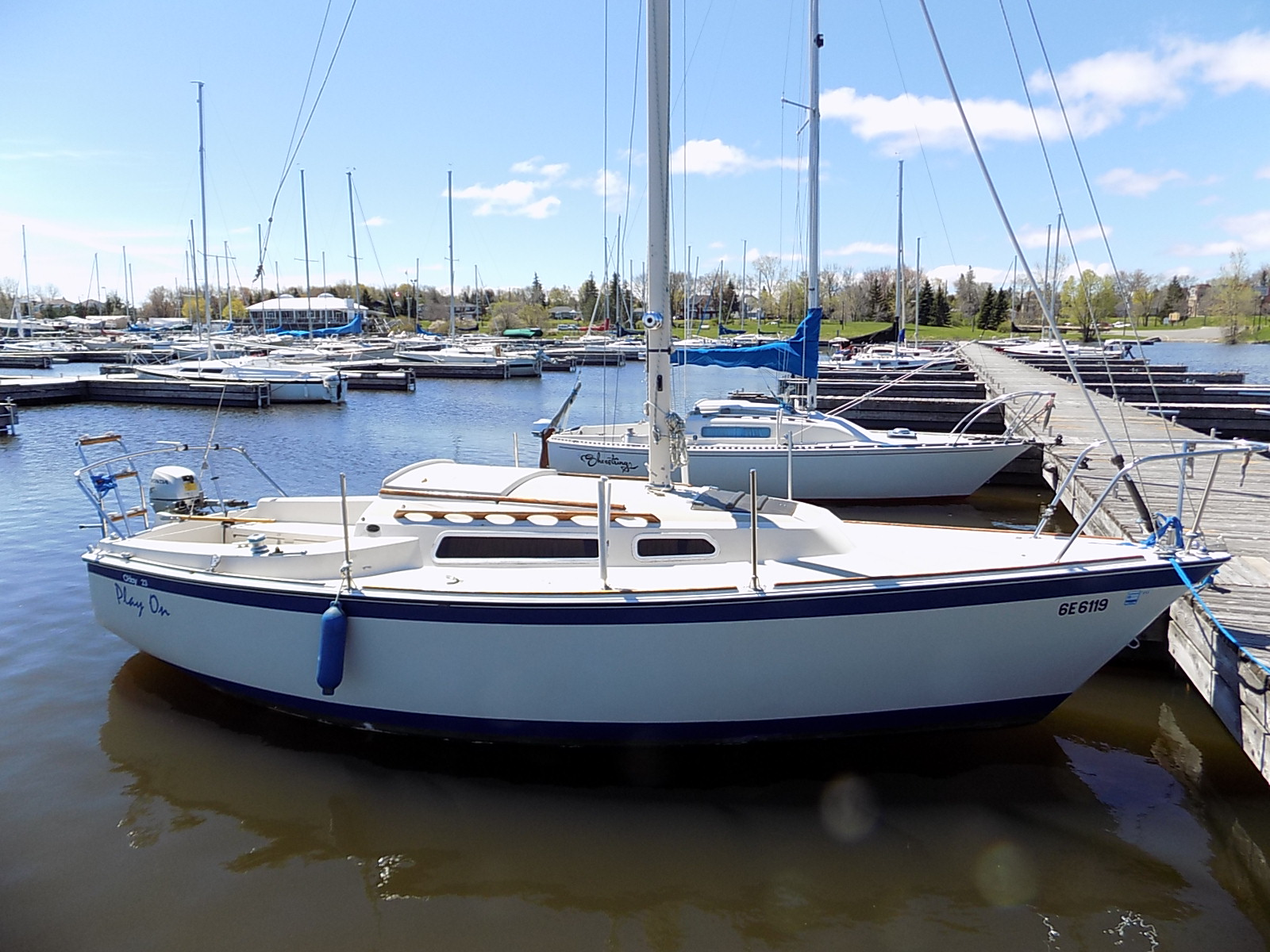

Development
- Designer: C. Raymond Hunt Assoc.
- Location: United States
- Year: 1978
- No. built: 1,000
- Builder: O'Day Corporation
- Name: O'Day 23-2

Boat
- Displacement: 3,425 lb (1,554 kg)
- Draft: 5.33 ft (1.62 m) centerboard down

Hull
- Type: Monohull
- Construction: Fiberglass
- LOA: 23.00 ft (7.01 m)
- LWL: 19.50 ft (5.94 m)
- Beam: 7.92 ft (2.41 m)
- Engine: Outboard motor

Hull appendages
- Keel: Centerboard
- Ballast: 1,200 lb (544 kg)
- Rudder: transom-mounted rudder

Rig
- General: Masthead sloop
- I foretriangle height: 28.00 ft (8.53 m)
- J foretriangle base: 10.00 ft (3.05 m)
- P mainsail luff: 23.42 ft (7.14 m)
- E mainsail foot: 9.00 ft (2.74 m)

Sails
- Mainsail area: 105.39 sq ft (9.791 m^{2})
- Jib/genoa area: 140.00 sq ft (13.006 m^{2})
- Total sail area: 245.39 sq ft (22.797 m^{2})

Racing
- PHRF: 240

The O'Day 23 is a series of recreational keelboats designed by C. Raymond Hunt Assoc. built by O'Day Corporation in the United States and the 23-2 was also built by Mariner Construções Náuticas Ltd in Brazil. All are now out of production.

== Design ==
The O'Day 23 is a small recreational keelboat, built predominantly of fiberglass, with wood trim. It has a masthead sloop rig, a transom-hung rudder and a folding centerboard keel. The boats are normally fitted with outboard motors.

When it was introduced the O'Day 23-1 model incorporated a unique and controversial pop-up "Lift Top", whereby the entire coachhouse roof could be raised on lift struts above the deck. The mast is keel stepped and the roof slides up on the mast, which does not move. On later 23-1s the lift top was reduced in size, called a "Convertible Top" and just lifts the area behind the mast. When the 23-2 was introduced in 1978 it was of a more conventional design and eliminated this feature entirely.

== Variants ==
O'Day 23-1
This model was introduced in 1972, with 500 examples completed. It has the pop-up "Lift Top" or later "Convertible Top". The design has a length overall of 23.00 ft (7.0 m), a waterline length of 20.00 ft (6.1 m), displaces 3,100 lb (1,406 kg) and carries 1,250 lb (567 kg) of ballast. The boat has a draft of 5.40 ft (1.65 m) with the centerboard down and 2.00 ft (0.61 m) with the centerboard retracted. The boat has a hull speed of 5.99 kn (11.09 km/h). The boat is normally fitted with a small 3 to 6 hp (2 to 4 kW) outboard motor for docking and maneuvering. The design has sleeping accommodation for five people, with a double "V"-berth in the bow cabin, a drop-down dinette table that converts to a double berth and an aft quarter berth on the port side. The galley is located on the port side just forward of the companionway ladder. The galley is equipped with a two-burner stove, ice box and a sink. The head is located in the bow cabin on the starboard side. Cabin headroom is 55 in (140 cm). The design has a PHRF racing average handicap of 234 and a hull speed of 6.0 kn (11.1 km/h).
O'Day 23-2
This model was introduced in 1978 and built until 1984, with 1000 examples completed by O'Day in the US and Mariner Construções Náuticas Ltd in Brazil. It has a length overall of 23.00 ft (7.0 m), a waterline length of 19.50 ft (5.9 m), displaces 3,425 lb (1,554 kg) and carries 1,200 lb (544 kg) of lead ballast. The boat has a draft of 5.33 ft (1.62 m) with the centerboard down and 2.26 ft (0.69 m) with the centerboard retracted. The boat has a hull speed of 5.92 kn (10.96 km/h). The boat is normally fitted with a small 3 to 6 hp (2 to 4 kW) outboard motor or an optional inboard motor for docking and maneuvering. The design has sleeping accommodation for five people, with a double "V"-berth in the bow cabin, a drop-down dinette table that converts to a double berth and a single settee berth on the starboard side. The galley is located on both sides of the companionway ladder, with a two-burner stove to port and a sink to starboard. The cockpit has an ice box on the starboard side. The head is located in the bow cabin on the port side. Cabin headroom is 60 in (152 cm). The design has a PHRF racing average handicap of 240 and a hull speed of 6.0 kn (11.1 km/h).

== Reception ==
In a 2010 review of the O'Day 23-1 Steve Henkel wrote, "This vessel was produced in several versions—two types of poptops and a solid top—over five years, 1970 to 1974. A Mk II version ... with no poptop (and other differences) followed in 1977. In the Mk I version, one of the poptop designs was a 'convertible,' that is, the whole cabin trunk roof lifted on struts (see phantom view). However, there were problems with sealing out rain and spray in the joint between cabin trunk and deck, and the through-the-deck mast. Consequently, the design was dropped in favor of an alternative poptop in which only the aft section lifted. This allowed the mast to be stepped in a tabernacle on the cabintop, making mast setup at a launching ramp much easier ... No significant negative features were noted by us, other than the 'convertible' poptop idea."

In a 2010 review of the O'Day 23-2 Steve Henkel wrote, "The O’Day 23 Mk II (22) follows a series of 21-, 22 and 23-footers by C. Raymond Hunt Associates and various other designers, all targeted at the same market ... Until the O'Day company ceased operations in 1989, they were a potent force in the small sailboat market in the eastern U.S,, particularly in the 21- to 23-foot size range, of which this design is representative. Best features: Compared to her comp[etitor]s, which are all heavy centerboarders, the O'Day 23 Mk II ... has the highest (that is, best) Space Index and the lowest minimum draft, is tied for the greatest headroom and the lowest average PHRF, and has the heaviest construction (calculated by subtracting ballast from displacement). Worst features: The mainsheet traveler, led to a bridle attached to the split backstay, is not one of our favorite rigging arrangements, as the helmsman has to look aft to find the mainsheet bitter end, undesirable when racing tight quarters."
