= O'Day 22 =

1970s US recreational keelboat

Development
- Designer: C. Raymond Hunt & Associates
- Location: United States
- Year: 1972
- No. built: 3,159
- Builder: O'Day Corp.
- Role: Cruiser
- Name: O'Day 22

Boat
- Displacement: 2,183 lb (990 kg)
- Draft: 4.25 ft (1.30 m) with centerboard down

Hull
- Type: monohull
- Construction: fiberglass
- LOA: 21.67 ft (6.61 m)
- LWL: 18.92 ft (5.77 m)
- Beam: 7.17 ft (2.19 m)
- Engine: outboard motor

Hull appendages
- Keel: stub keel and centerboard
- Ballast: 800 lb (363 kg)
- Rudder: transom-mounted rudder

Rig
- Rig type: Bermuda rig
- I foretriangle height: 22.00 ft (6.71 m)
- J foretriangle base: 8.00 ft (2.44 m)
- P mainsail luff: 24.50 ft (7.47 m)
- E mainsail foot: 9.00 ft (2.74 m)

Sails
- Sailplan: fractional rigged sloop
- Mainsail area: 110.25 sq ft (10.243 m^{2})
- Jib/genoa area: 88.00 sq ft (8.175 m^{2})
- Total sail area: 198.25 sq ft (18.418 m^{2})

Racing
- PHRF: 288

The O'Day 22 is a recreational keelboat built by O'Day Corp. in the United States from 1972 until 1983. It was one of the most successful boats produced by the company, with 3,159 built. It was replaced by the O'Day 222.

== Design ==
It was designed by C. Raymond Hunt & Associates.

The fiberglass hull has a raked stem, a reverse transom, a transom-hung rudder controlled by a tiller and a fixed shoal draft fin keel or stub keel and centerboard. It displaces 2,000 to 2,283 lb (907 to 1,036 kg) as the lead ballast fitted varied from 600 to 800 lb (272 to 363 kg), increased over the eleven-year production of the boat. The keel-equipped version of the boat has a draft of 1.93 ft (0.59 m), while the centerboard-equipped version has a draft of 4.25 ft (1.30 m) with the centerboard extended and 1.25 ft (0.38 m) with it retracted, allowing operation in shallow water or ground transportation on a trailer.

The O'Day 22 was initially offered with a masthead sloop rig, but, after 1980, used a fractional rig. A tall mast was also optional, with a mast about 4.00 ft (1.22 m) higher.

The boat is normally fitted with a small 3 to 6 hp (2 to 4 kW) outboard motor for docking and maneuvering.

The design has sleeping accommodation for four people, with a double "V"-berth in the bow cabin and two straight settees in the main cabin, with a drop-leaf table. The head is located just aft of the bow cabin on the port side. The galley is located on the port side just aft of the head and is equipped with a two-burner stove and a sink. A hanging locker is opposite the head, on the starboard side. Cabin headroom is 54 in (137 cm).

The design has a PHRF racing average handicap of 288 and a hull speed of 5.8 kn (10.7 km/h).

== Reception ==
In a 2010 review Steve Henkel wrote, "You could buy an O’Day 22 in a number of configurations: Shoal keel (1' 11" draft) or centerboard ... masthead or 3/4 fractional rig; standard or tall rig; settee berths in the cabin or a dinette arrangement ... Small and not-so-small changes over the 11 years this boat was produced also add to the confusion; ballast was 600 pounds in early production, then went to 700, and finally became 800 pounds, strangely with no other changes to the overall weight of the vessel. Best features: O'Day produced the 22 with a nice exterior finish. Worst features: The rudder is immersed further than the keel on the keel-centerboard model, a no-no when the rudder is fixed in place as this one is, When the keel skims close to a rock but misses it, the rudder may hit and carry away. Also, the position of the mainsheet can interfere with control of the outboard motor, which is not within easy reach of the helmsperson."

In a 2000 review in Practical Sailor, Darrell Nicholson wrote, "O’Day once set a standard for small boat construction and styling. That was before on and off labor problems in its plant, management changes under Bangor Punta, the decline in sales of boats in its size range, and increasingly fierce competition for buyers who became more cost than quality conscious. The later O'Day 22s were, frankly, a mixed bag of quality and shabbiness ... On a boat of this size and price, a minimum of exterior trim is understandable. What is less understandable is the poor quality of the interior finish and decor. Belowdecks the O'Day 22 epitomizes the pejorative label Clorox bottle, used to describe fiberglass boats. Sloppily fitted bits of teak trim are matched against teak-printed Formica, at best a tacky combination. Cabinetry, such as there is, is flimsy, and in general the whole impression is of lackluster attention to details."
