= Day Sailer =

Sailboat design

- Class symbol

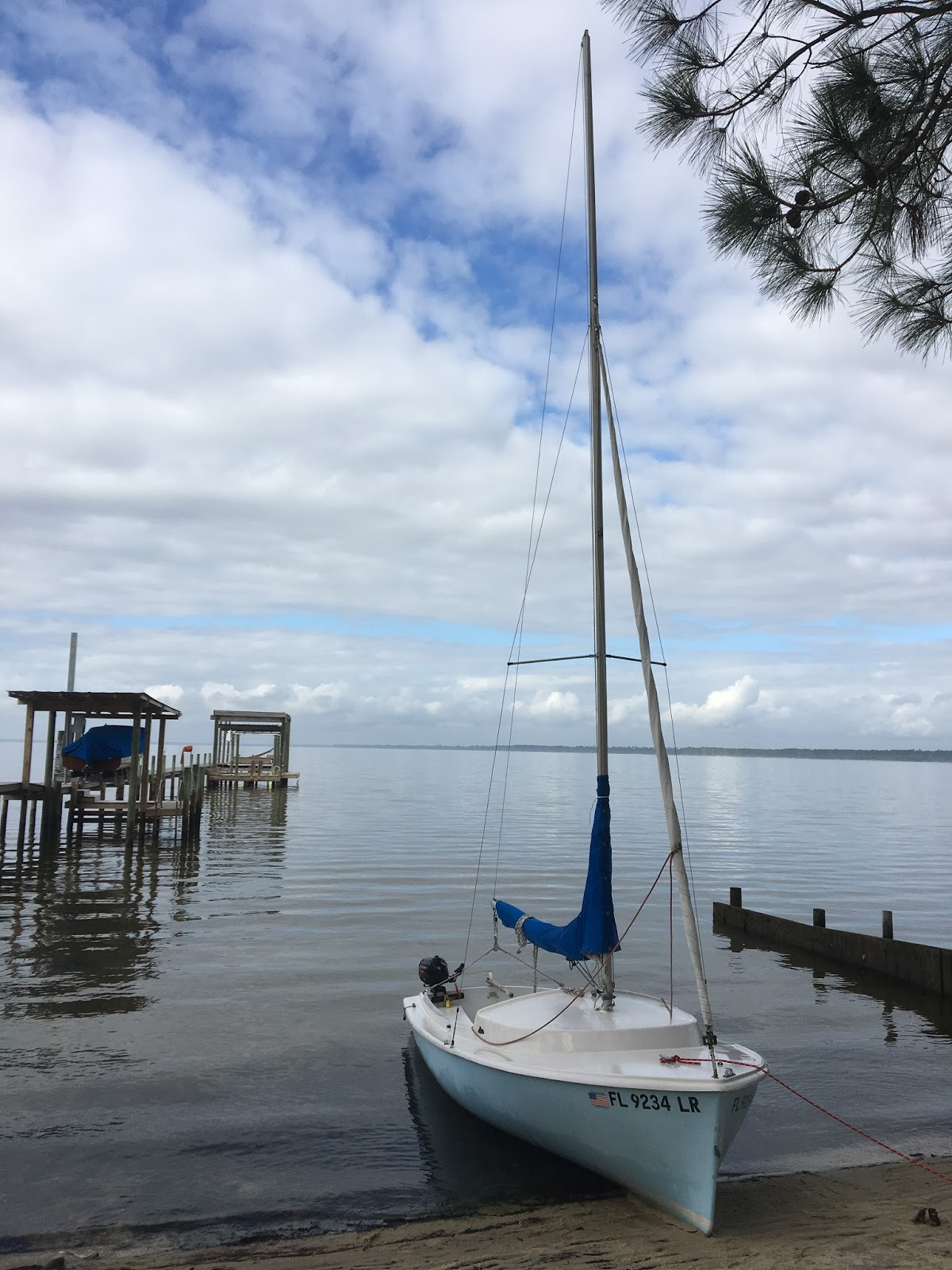

Development
- Designer: Uffa Fox and George O'Day
- Year: 1958
- Name: Day Sailer

Boat
- Crew: 2
- Draft: 1.143 metres (3.75 ft)

Hull
- Type: Monohull
- Construction: Fiberglass
- Hull weight: 261 kilograms (575 lb)
- LOA: 5.105 metres (16.75 ft)
- Beam: 1.829 metres (6.00 ft)

Hull appendages
- Keel: Centerboard

Rig
- Mast height: 6.858 metres (22.50 ft)

Sails
- Spinnaker area: 8.8 square metres (95 sq ft)
- Upwind sail area: 13.47 square metres (145.0 sq ft)

The Day Sailer (also called the O'Day Day Sailer) is a day sailer for pleasure sailing as well as racing; it is sailed throughout North America and Brazil. Designed by Uffa Fox and George O'Day in 1958, the Day Sailer possesses a 6-foot beam, an overall length of 17 feet, a fiberglass hull and a cuddy cabin. It is able to sleep two (more if a tent is added to the boom). The sloop rig includes mainsail, jib and a spinnaker on an aluminum mast and boom.

Over 10,000 boats have been built, and races are held throughout the year in the US and Brazil by the Day Sailer Association and its fleets. The Day Sailer was inducted in 2003 into the American Sailboat Hall of Fame.

From 1958 until 1972, the boat was built and sold by O'Day Corp. Later various other builders produced the Day Sailer, including Spindrift, Precision Boat Works, McLaughlin Boat Works, and Sunfish/Laser Inc. Since 1995, the boat has been built by Cape Cod Shipbuilding.

As of 2010, the Junior North American Championships are to be held every year in order to promote the class and reach out to local youth sailors.
