= John O'Day =

John O'Day may refer to:

- John O'Day (California politician) (fl. 1890s)
- John O'Day (New Hampshire politician) (fl. 2010s–2020s)
- John O'Day (Wisconsin politician) (1856–1933), American politician
