= Widgeon 12 =

Sailboat class

Development
- Designer: Robert H. Baker
- Location: United States
- Year: 1964
- No. built: 5300
- Builder: O'Day Corp.
- Role: Sailing dinghy
- Name: Widgeon 12

Boat
- Crew: two
- Displacement: 180 lb (82 kg)
- Draft: 3.50 ft (1.07 m) with centerboard down

Hull
- Type: Monohull
- Construction: Fiberglass
- LOA: 12.33 ft (3.76 m)
- LWL: 12.00 ft (3.66 m)
- Beam: 5.00 ft (1.52 m)

Hull appendages
- Keel: centerboard
- Rudder: transom-mounted rudder

Rig
- Rig type: Bermuda rig

Sails
- Sailplan: Fractional rigged sloop
- Mainsail area: 65 sq ft (6.0 m^{2})
- Jib/genoa area: 25 sq ft (2.3 m^{2})
- Spinnaker area: 72 sq ft (6.7 m^{2})
- Total sail area: 90.00 sq ft (8.361 m^{2})

Racing
- D-PN: 122.6

The Widgeon 12 is an American sailing dinghy that was designed by Robert H. Baker and first built in 1964. The design has been raced but is more often employed in the sail training role.

== Production ==
The design was built by O'Day Corp. in the United States. A total of 5,300 boats were completed starting in 1964, but it is now out of production.

== Design ==
The Widgeon 12 is a recreational sailboat, built predominantly of fiberglass, with wood trim. It has a fractional sloop rig with a loose-footed mainsail, a nearly plumb stem, a vertical transom, a transom-hung, kick-up rudder controlled by a tiller and a retractable centerboard. It displaces 180 lb (82 kg) and the fiberglass centerboard weighs 15 lb (7 kg). It may be equipped with a spinnaker of 72 sq ft (6.7 m^{2}).

The boat has a draft of 3.50 ft (1.07 m) with the centerboard extended and 0.42 ft (0.13 m) with it retracted, allowing beaching or ground transportation on a trailer or car roof rack.

The boat may be fitted with a small outboard motor of up to 4 hp (3 kW) for docking and maneuvering.

The design can accommodate four people although it is normally raced with two sailors. For sailing the design is equipped with a sealed mast, plus the boat has foam flotation to enhance self rescue in the event of a capsize. It has a bow eye that can be used to attach a painter line for mooring or trailering the boat.

Factory options available included an outhaul, boom vang and a tiller extension for hiking out. The bow stowage compartment has optional doors.

The design has a Portsmouth Yardstick racing average handicap of 122.6.

== Operational history ==
In a 1994 review Richard Sherwood wrote that the "Widgeon is light and responsive and accelerates quickly. It is raced, but probably the primary use has been as a trainer."

Sail maker Sailrite notes, "the O'Day Widgeon is large enough for parents to sail with their small children yet small enough to be easily singlehanded. The Widgeon can be sailed with the main only or the more standard sloop rig".

== See also ==
- List of sailing boat types
