= O'Day 30 =

Sailboat class

Development
- Designer: C.R. Hunt & Associates
- Location: United States
- Year: 1977
- No. built: 356
- Builder: O'Day Corp.
- Name: O'Day 30

Boat
- Displacement: 10,150 lb (4,604 kg)
- Draft: 4.90 ft (1.49 m)

Hull
- Type: Monohull
- Construction: Fiberglass
- LOA: 29.92 ft (9.12 m)
- LWL: 25.42 ft (7.75 m)
- Beam: 10.75 ft (3.28 m)
- Engine: Universal 18 hp (13 kW) diesel engine

Hull appendages
- Keel: fin keel
- Ballast: 4,000 lb (1,814 kg)
- Rudder: internally-mounted spade-type rudder

Rig
- Rig type: Bermuda rig
- I foretriangle height: 39.75 ft (12.12 m)
- J foretriangle base: 13.50 ft (4.11 m)
- P mainsail luff: 33.75 ft (10.29 m)
- E mainsail foot: 10.25 ft (3.12 m)

Sails
- Sailplan: Masthead sloop
- Mainsail area: 172.97 sq ft (16.069 m^{2})
- Jib/genoa area: 268.31 sq ft (24.927 m^{2})
- Total sail area: 441.28 sq ft (40.996 m^{2})

Racing
- PHRF: 178 (average with keel)

The O'Day 30 is an American sailboat that was designed by C.R. Hunt & Associates as a cruiser and first built in 1977.

The O'Day 30 design was developed into the O'Day 31 in 1985 with the addition of an extended stern.

== Production ==
The design was built by O'Day Corp. in the United States. The company built 356 examples of the design between 1977 and 1984, when production ended.

== Design ==
The O'Day 30 is a recreational keelboat, built predominantly of fiberglass, with teak wood trim. It has a masthead sloop rig, a raked stem, a slightly reverse transom, an internally mounted spade-type rudder controlled by a wheel and a fixed fin keel or optionally, a stub keel and centerboard. It displaces 10,150 lb (4,604 kg) and carries 4,000 lb (1,814 kg) of ballast.

The keel-equipped version of the boat has a draft of 4.90 ft (1.49 m), while the centerboard-equipped version has a draft of 7.18 ft (2.19 m) with the centerboard extended and 3.50 ft (1.07 m) with it retracted.

The boat is fitted with a Universal diesel engine of 18 hp (13 kW). The fuel tank holds 26 U.S. gallons (98 L; 22 imp gal) and the fresh water tank has a capacity of 25 U.S. gallons (95 L; 21 imp gal).

The boat's galley is located on the port side of the cabin, extending under the companionway ladder. On the port side is a stainless steel sink and a two-burner alcohol stove. There is hot and cold water, manually-pumped. The head has a privacy door and a hanging locker with a louvered door and is located forward, just aft of the bow "V"-berth. Additional sleeping space is provided by the dinette settee, which has a drop-down octagonal table, another port side straight settee and a quarter berth under the cockpit on the starboard side.

Ventilation is provided by four opening ports in the cabin, while there are six other fixed cabin ports.

The boat has two genoa winches, two mast-mounted winches for the halyards and twio more optional winches for the spinnaker. There is an optional boom vang and mainsheet traveler, which is mounted on the bridge deck. There is an anchor locker in the bow.

The keel-equipped version has a PHRF racing average handicap of 178, while the centerboard-equipped version has a PHRF of 177.

== Operational history ==
A review in Practical Sailor described the design, "All things considered, the O'Day 30 is a boat that performs well under sail. She’s not really a racer, but she will stay up with almost any boat of her size and type, and is easy to handle, to boot." The review concluded, "With her good performance and big interior, the O'Day 30 makes a reasonable coastal cruising boat. This is a low-maintenance boat, with little exterior wood. Along with low maintenance, you get pretty plain-Jane appearance. The boat still looks modern. If she appeared in a boat show today, she wouldn’t look dated."

== See also ==
- List of sailing boat types
