= Mariner 19 =

Sailboat class

Mariner 19 FK
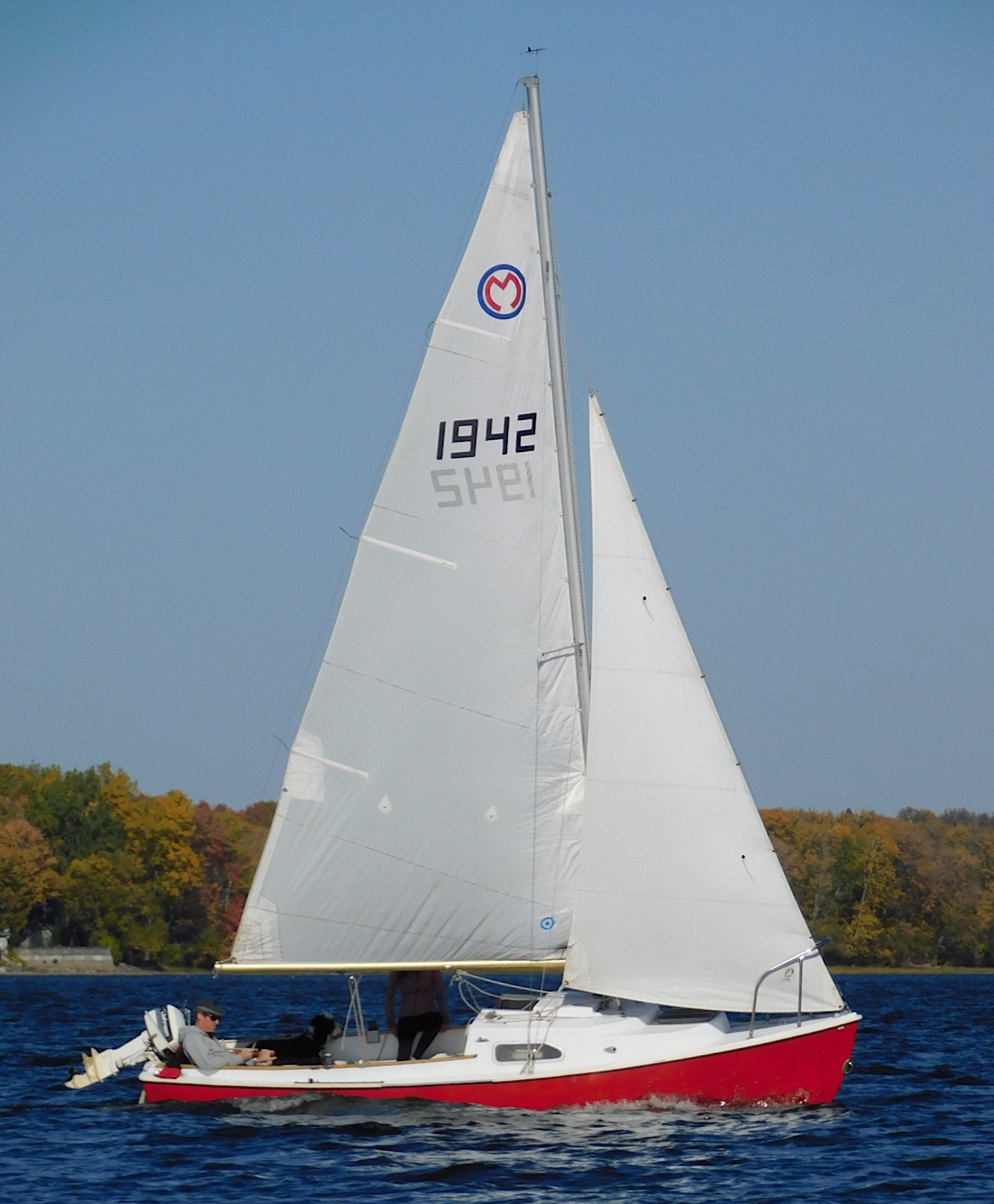

Development
- Designer: Philip Rhodes
- Location: United States
- Year: 1962
- No. built: 4,100 (1994)
- Builders: O'Day Corporation; Rebel Industries; Stuart Marine
- Name: Mariner 19 FK

Boat
- Displacement: 1,430 lb (649 kg)
- Draft: 3.30 ft (1.01 m)

Hull
- Type: Monohull
- Construction: Fiberglass
- LOA: 19.16 ft (5.84 m)
- LWL: 17.75 ft (5.41 m)
- Beam: 7.00 ft (2.13 m)
- Engine: Outboard motor

Hull appendages
- Keel: fin keel with a weight bulb
- Rudder: transom-mounted rudder

Rig
- Rig type: Bermuda rig
- I foretriangle height: 20.00 ft (6.10 m)
- J foretriangle base: 6.90 ft (2.10 m)
- P mainsail luff: 23.00 ft (7.01 m)
- E mainsail foot: 10.00 ft (3.05 m)

Sails
- Sailplan: Fractional rigged sloop
- Mainsail area: 115.00 sq ft (10.684 m^{2})
- Jib/genoa area: 69.00 sq ft (6.410 m^{2})
- Total sail area: 184.00 sq ft (17.094 m^{2})

Racing
- PHRF: 285

The Mariner 19 is an American trailerable sailboat, that was designed by Philip Rhodes and first built in 1962.

== Production ==
The design was initially built in 1962 by O'Day Corporation in the United States. O'Day sold the molds to Rebel Industries in 1980 and that company built the design as the Spindrift One, with a modified cabin, with 76 boats completed. Stuart Marine became the licensed builder in 1986 and the design remained in production in 2020. By 1994, 4,100 boats had been completed.

The Mariner 19 shares the same hull design as the Rhodes 19.

== Design ==
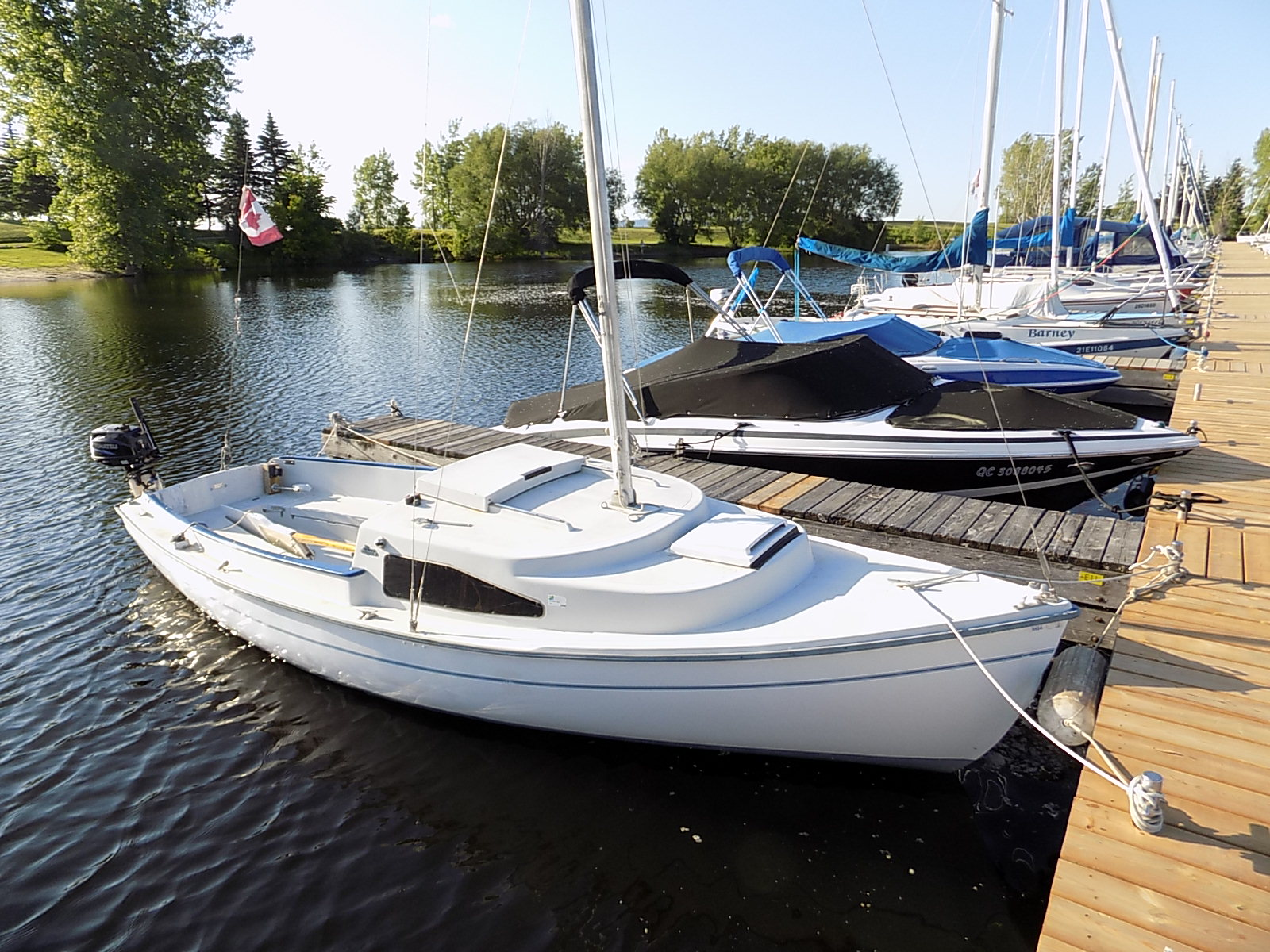
Mariner 19

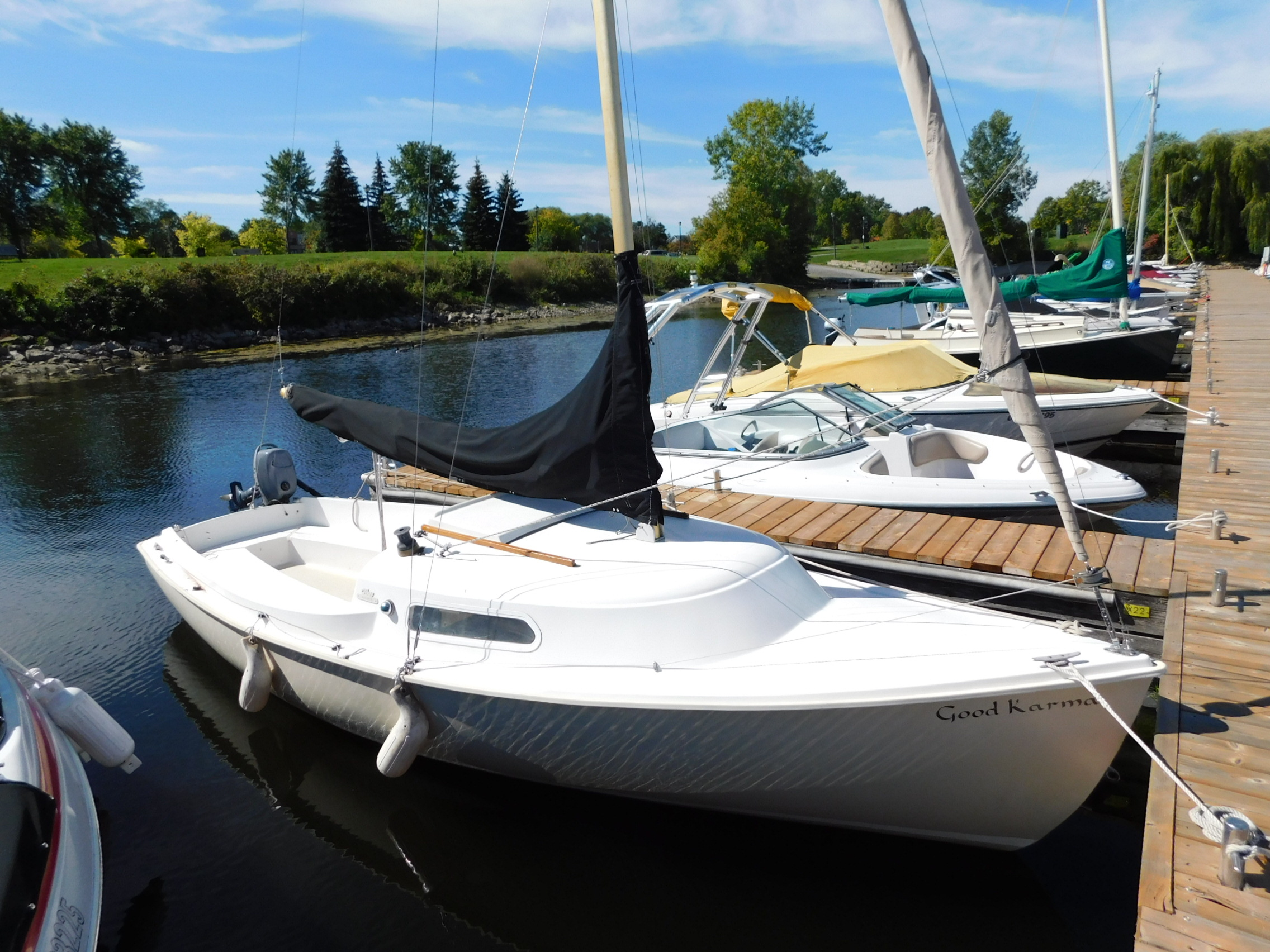
later model Mariner 19 with newer cabin design

The Mariner 19 is a small recreational keelboat, built predominantly of fiberglass. It has a fractional sloop rig, a rounded raked stem, a vertical transom, a transom-hung rudder controlled by a tiller and a fixed fin keel or optional centerboard. It displaces 1,430 lb (649 kg).

The design has a small cuddy cabin, which was made larger in 1969, under the model designation of "2+2".

The keel-equipped version of the boat has a draft of 3.30 ft (1.01 m), while the centreboard-equipped version has a draft of 4.92 ft (1.50 m) with the centreboard extended and 0.83 ft (0.25 m) with it retracted, allowing beaching or ground transportation on a trailer. The centerboard weighs 210 lb (95 kg).

The boat is normally fitted with a small 3 to 6 hp (2 to 4 kW) outboard motor for docking and maneuvering.

Optional equipment includes a 105 sq ft (9.8 m^{2}) genoa, a spinnaker and a boom vang.

The design has sleeping accommodation for two people with a single bow "V"-berth or four people with the addition of two quarter berths. Cabin headroom is 44 in (112 cm).

The design has a PHRF racing average handicap of 285 and a hull speed of 5.65 kn (10.46 km/h).

== Operational history ==
In a 1994 review Richard Sherwood describes the design as "a very typical day sailer" and notes, "there is sharp bow entry and high freeboard; like the Rhodes 19, the Mariner can handle heavy weather. This capability is enhanced by the 210-pound centerboard."

In a 2010 review Steve Henkel wrote, "originally a centerboard racer-daysailer designed in 1945 and known as the Rhodes 19, in the 1950s O'Day switched from molded plywood to fiberglass, added a cabin and—voila!—the fiberglass Mariner was conceived. After O'Day left the scene, Stuart took over production, which it has continued. The boat is available in both centerboard and iron keel versions, and as a two-sleeper (V-berth) or four-sleeper (V-berth plus quarterberth). Drawings in the Stuart sales brochures appear to have a narrower entry than the original Rhodes design, but Stuart tells us it's their drawings that are slightly inaccurate, not the boats. We'd ask around before buying to determine if the newest Mariners can be raced as a one-design class against the older O’Day boats, if that’s what you have in mind. Since Mariners have been around a long time, you can find them in all age groups and price ranges. Best features: Mast tabernacle and shallow draft in the centerboard version makes launching relatively easy—but the keel version has more stability. Take your choice. Worst features: The design, being close to 50 years old, is a bit old-fashioned, particularly in her underbody."

== See also ==
- List of sailing boat types

Related development

- Rhodes 19

Similar sailboats

- Cornish Shrimper 19
- COM-PAC 19
- West Wight Potter 19
