= O'Day 25 =

1970s US recreational keelboat

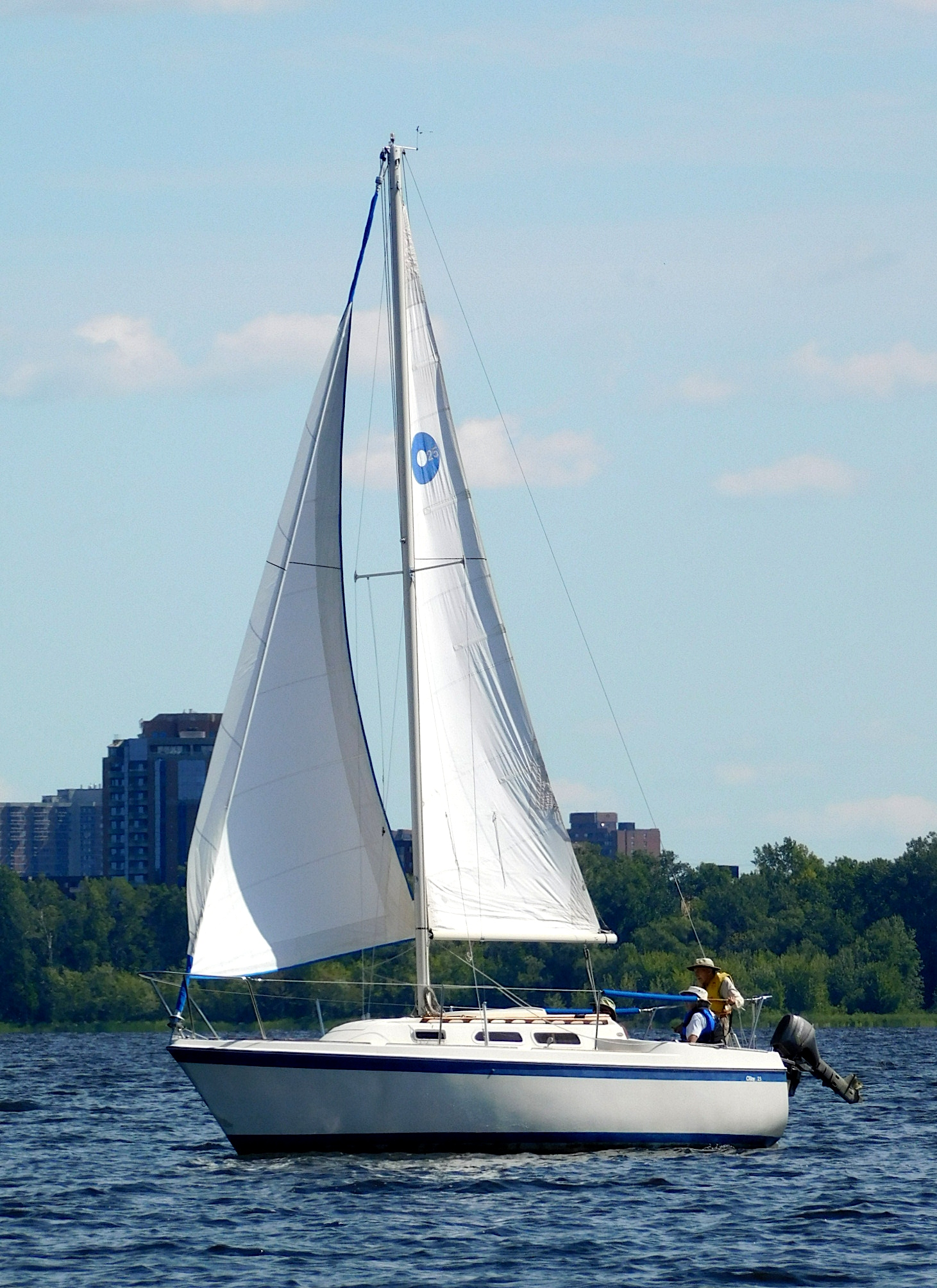

Development
- Designer: C.R. Hunt & Associates
- Location: United States
- Year: 1975
- No. built: 2,898
- Builder: O'Day Corp.

Boat
- Displacement: 4,007 lb (1,818 kg) (CB); 3,962 lb (1,797 kg) (Keel)
- Draft: 2.25 ft (0.69 m) (CB up); 6.00 ft (1.83 m) (CB down); 4.50 ft (1.37 m) (Keel)

Hull
- Type: Monohull
- Construction: Fiberglass
- LOA: 24.83 ft (7.57 m)
- LWL: 21.00 ft (6.40 m)
- Beam: 8.00 ft (2.44 m)
- Engine: outboard or inboard

Hull appendages
- Keel: swing up centerboard or fin keel
- Ballast: 1,825 lb (828 kg) (CB); 1,775 lb (805 kg) (Keel)
- Rudder: transom-mounted rudder

Rig
- General: Masthead sloop
- I foretriangle height: 30.00 ft (9.14 m) (CB); 32.00 ft (9.75 m) (Keel)
- J foretriangle base: 10.60 ft (3.23 m)
- P mainsail luff: 24.50 ft (7.47 m) (CB); 26.50 ft (8.08 m) (Keel)
- E mainsail foot: 9.00 ft (2.74 m)
- Mast height: 29.00 ft (8.84 m) (CB); 31.00 ft (9.45 m) (Keel)

Sails
- Mainsail area: 110.25 sq ft (10.243 m^{2})
- Jib/genoa area: 159.00 sq ft (14.772 m^{2})
- Total sail area: 269.25 sq ft (25.014 m^{2}) (CB); 290.00 sq ft (26.942 m^{2}) (Keel)

Rating
- PHRF: 234 (CB); 230 (Keel)

The O'Day 25 is a recreational keelboat that was designed by C.R. Hunt & Associates. It was built by O'Day Corp. in the United States, with 2,898 completed between 1975 and 1984, when production ended. It was one of the company's most successful designs.

== Design ==
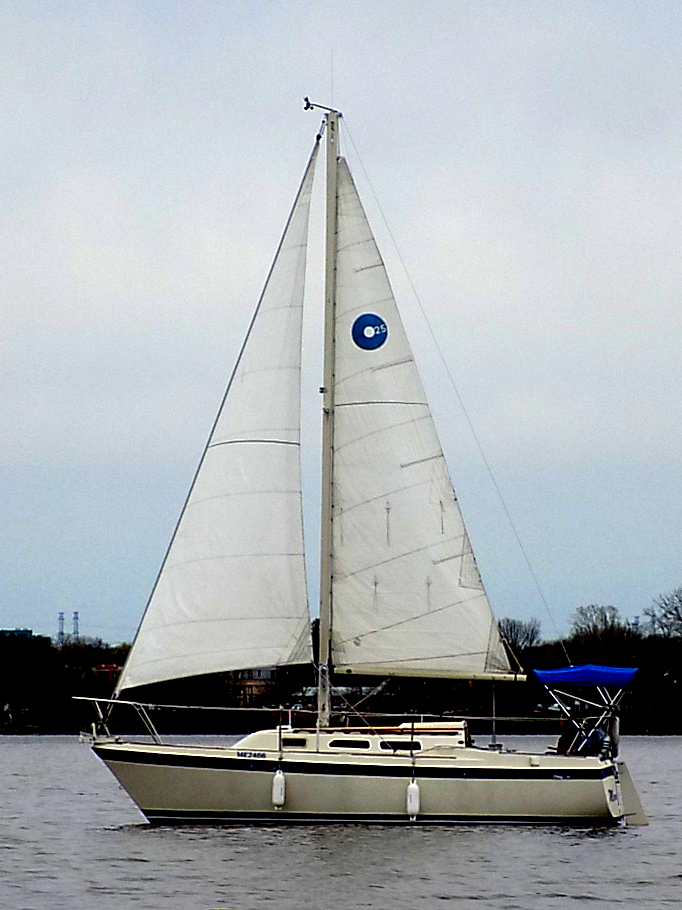
O'Day 25

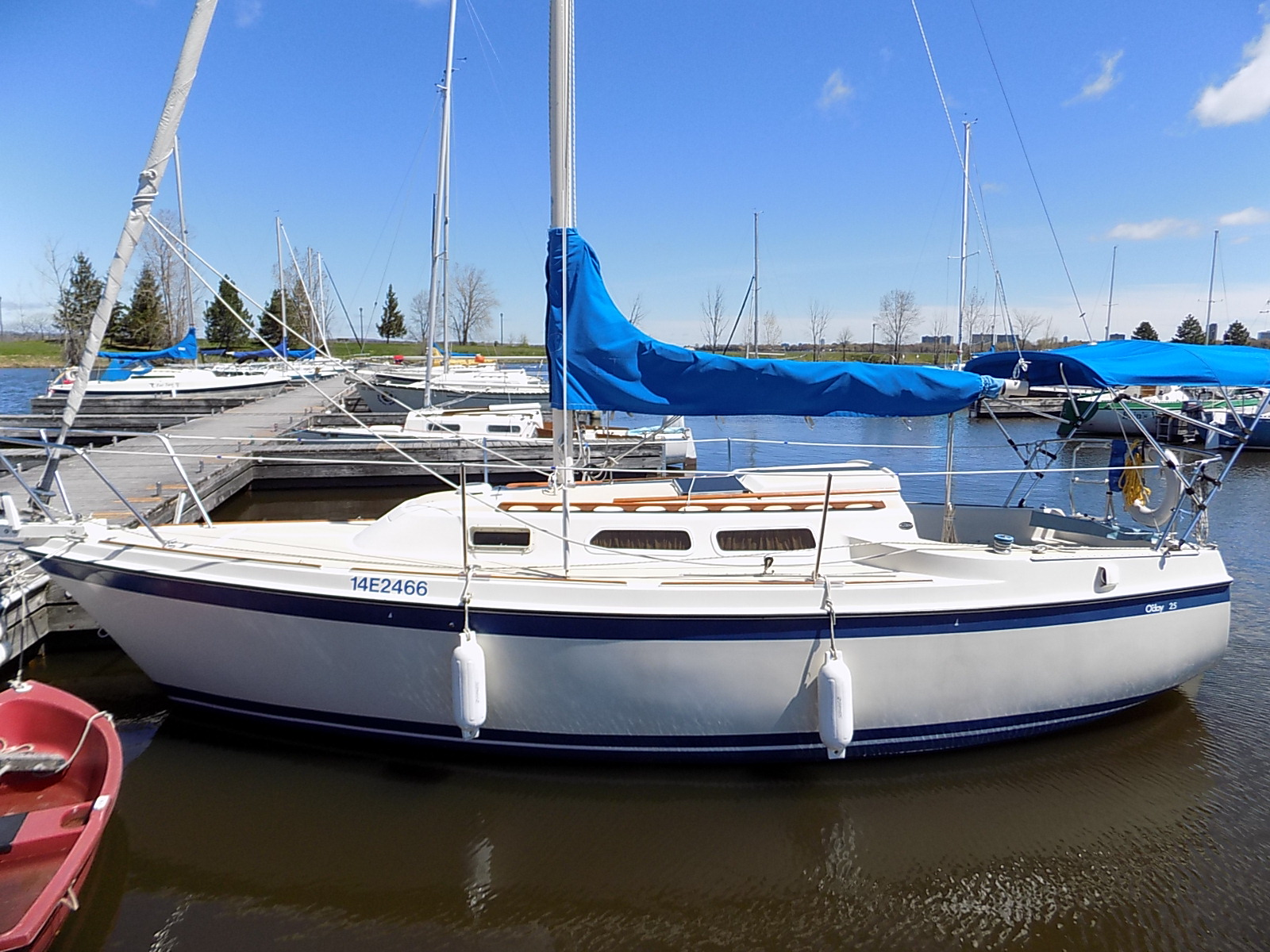
O'Day 25

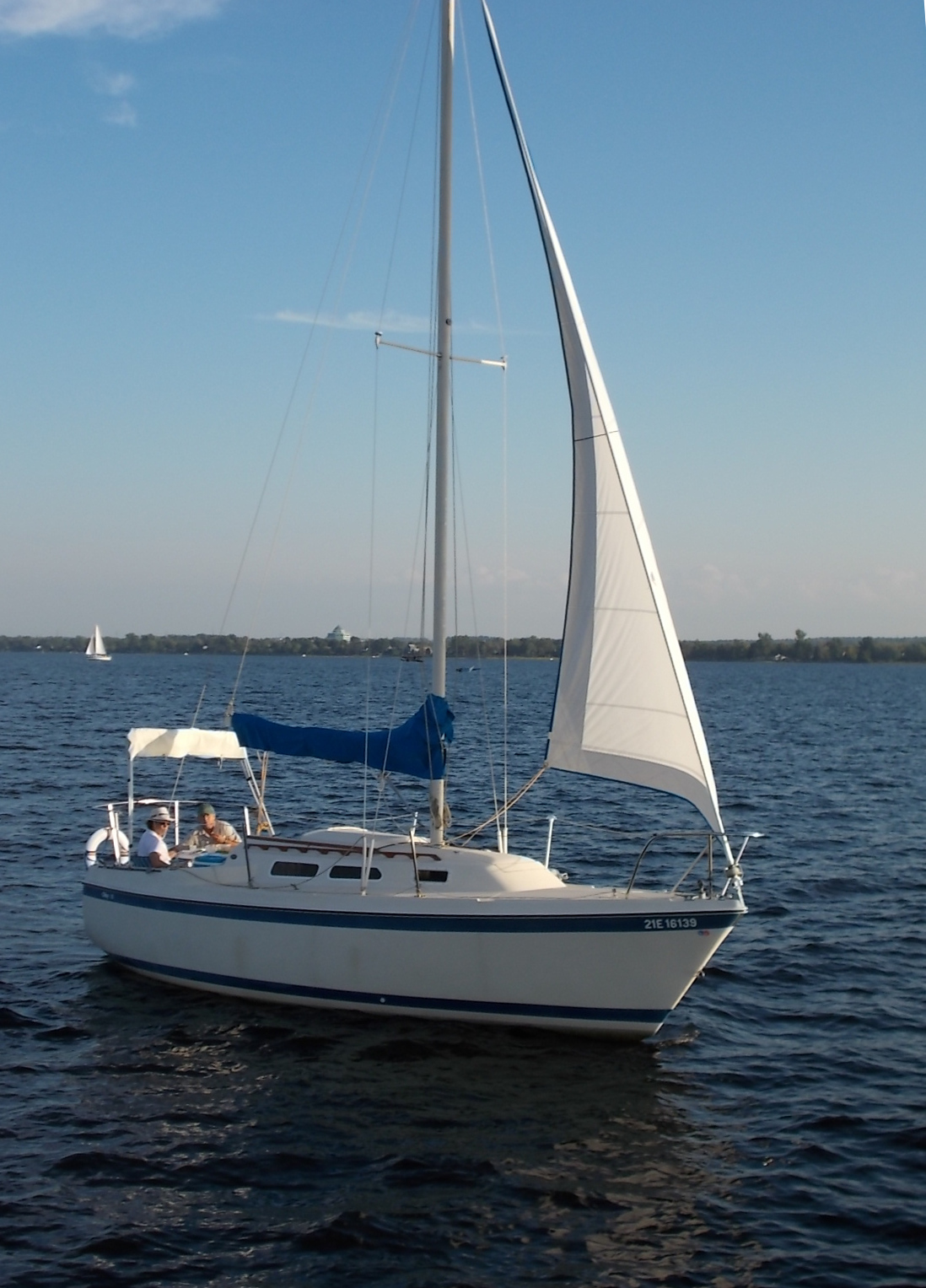
O'Day 25

The O'Day 25 is a small recreational keelboat, built predominantly of fiberglass, with wood trim. It has a masthead sloop rig, a transom-hung rudder and a centerboard or a fixed fin keel.

The boat has a draft of 6.00 ft (1.83 m) with the centerboard down and 2.25 ft (0.69 m) with the centerboard up, while the fixed fin keel version has a draft of 4.50 ft (1.37 m).

The boat is usually fitted with a small 4 to 15 hp (3 to 11 kW) outboard motor, and less often were various gas and diesel inboard engines available from the factory.

The centerboard model with a standard mast height has a PHRF racing average handicap of 234 while the fin keel with the taller mast and larger sail area has an average PHRF of 230. The hull speed of both variants is 6.14 kn (11.37 km/h).

== Variants ==
O'Day 25 CB
Swing centerboard model with a draft of 6.00 ft (1.83 m) when the centerboard is down, and 2.25 ft (0.69 m) when the centerboard is up. The rig is the standard height.
O'Day 25 Keel TM
Fixed fin keel model with a draft of 4.50 ft (1.37 m) and a taller mast by about 2 ft (0.61 m).

== Operational history ==
In a 2010 review Steve Henkel wrote, "the O'Day 25 ... came in two variations: the keel-centerboarder ... and a deep fin keel version with 4' 6" draft, 20 square feet more sail area, two-foot higher mast, and 50 pounds less ballast. Outboard power on a stern bracket (or a small Atomic 2 gasoline engine of 7 hp) was the choice at one point; then diesels came in. Production of both types of O'Day 25s together totaled over 2,800 between 1975 and 1983, right at the peak of the Golden Age of sailboat sales in this size range. Best features: Here is a nice-looking, good (though not superb) quality boat, with plenty of owners with whom to fraternize if you like to socialize ... Worst features: The galley seems a bit skimpy to us ..."
