= O'Day Corp. =

- Company type: Private Company
- Industry: maritime
- Founded: 1958
- Headquarters: Fall River, Massachusetts, United States

O'Day Corp. was an America sailboat builder, located in Fall River, Massachusetts.

== History ==
It was founded in 1958 by George O'Day, the American Olympic and World champion sailor.

George O'Day sold the company to Bangor Punta Corporation in 1966. Bangor Punta also acquired other boat builders around that time including Cal Yachts and Starcraft Marine. Bangor Punta was later acquired by Lear Siegler. O'Day went out of business in 1989.

== Boats ==
O'Day co-designed and built the Day Sailer which was inducted into the American Sailboat Hall of Fame in 2003. More than 12,000 Day Sailers have been sold.

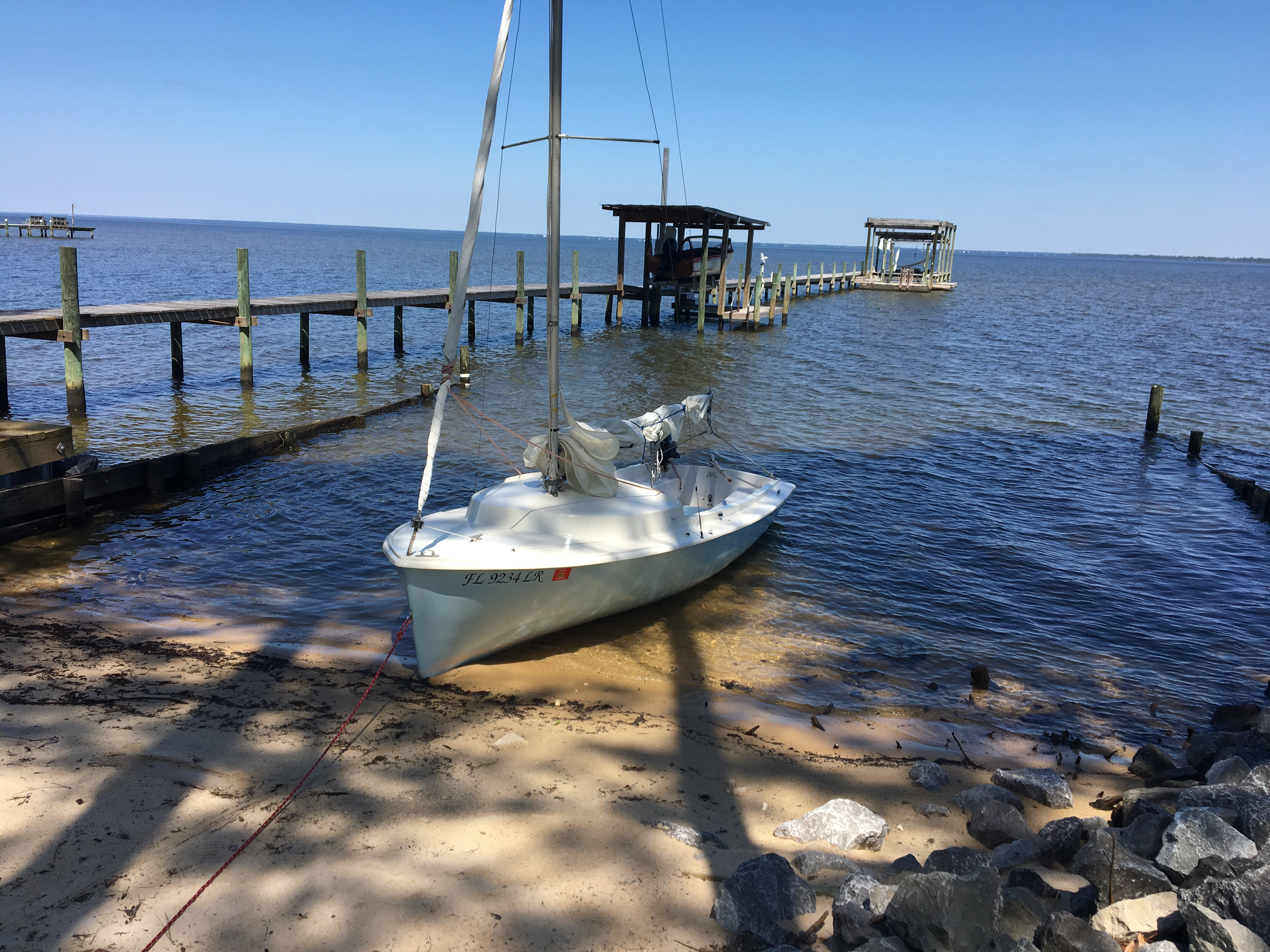
O'Day Day Sailer

In 1959 O'Day adapted the Philip Rhodes' Hurricane design to create the Rhodes 19. Over 3000 Rhodes 19's have been built. In 1982 Stuart Marine Corp. took over production of the Rhodes 19.

The company built many very popular sailboat designs:

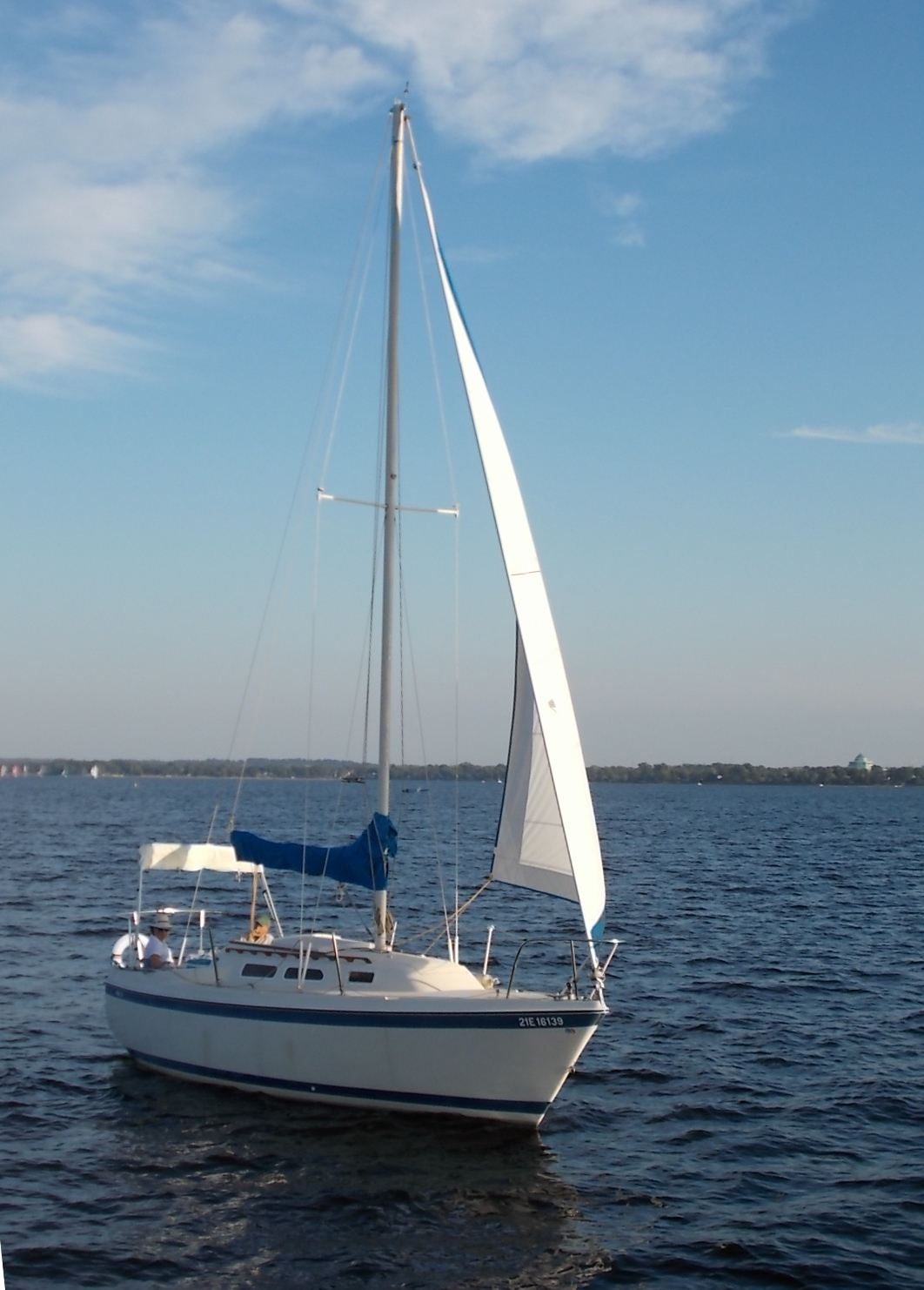
O'Day 25

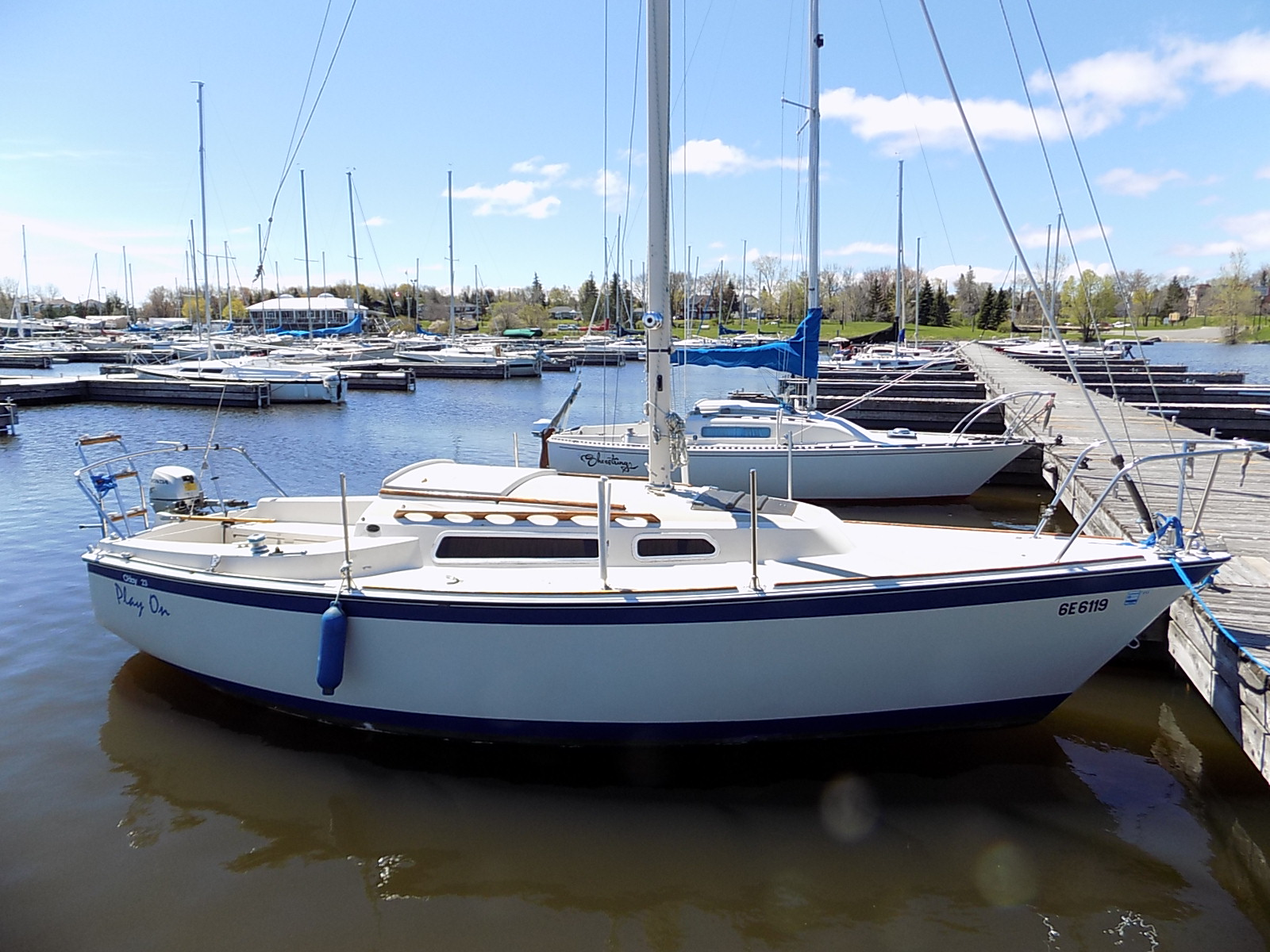
O'Day 23

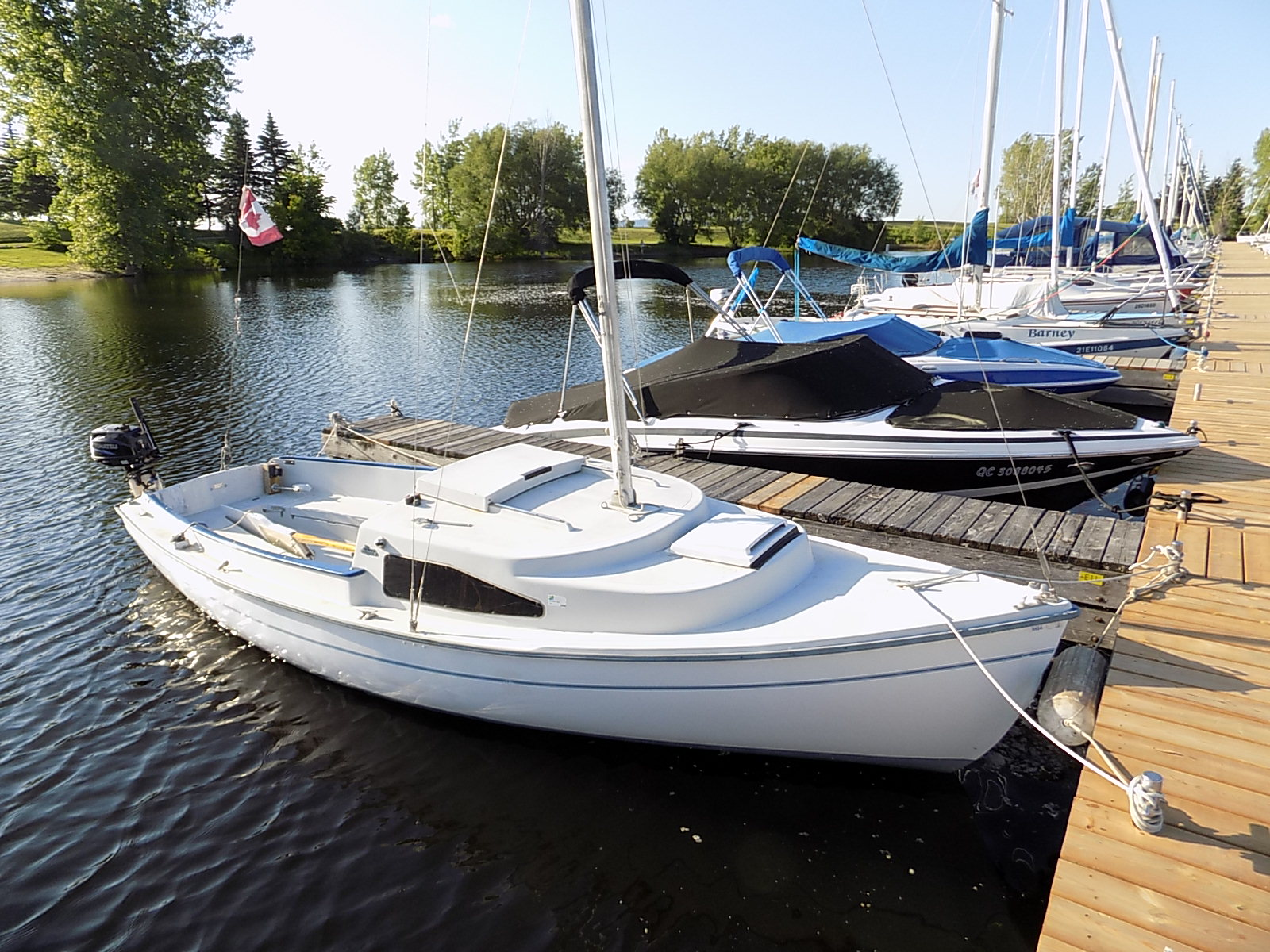
Mariner 19

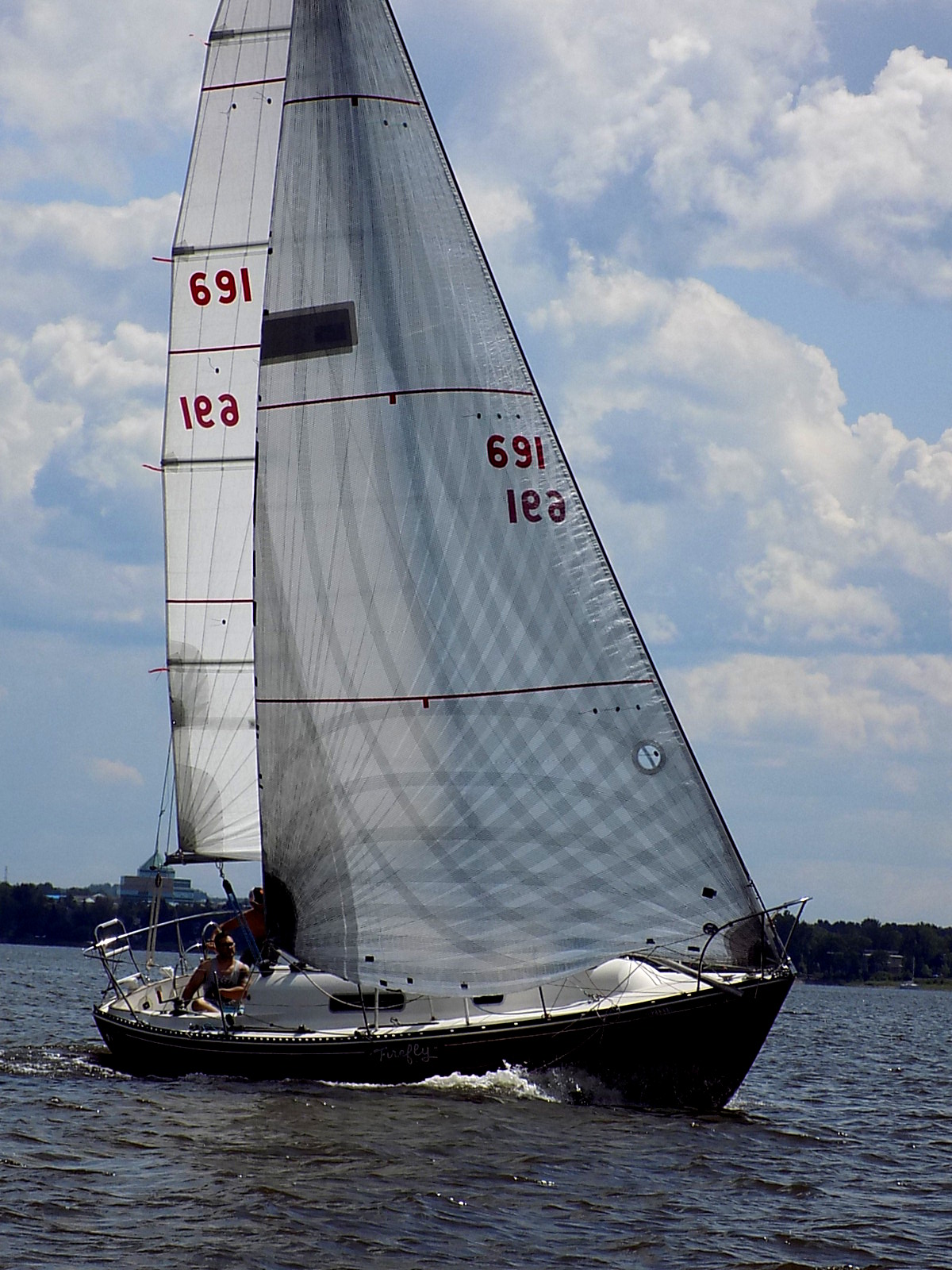
O'Day 28

- Albacore
- Cal 39 (Hunt/O'Day)
- Day Sailer
- Day Sailer II
- Dolphin 24
- Duckling
- Flying Saucer
- Gannet 14
- Interclub Dinghy
- International Cadet
- Javelin 14
- Jollyboat
- Kitten
- Mariner 19
- O'Day 7/11
- O'Day 12
- O'Day 14
- O'Day 15
- O'Day 19
- O'Day 192
- O'Day 20
- O'Day 22
- O'Day 222
- O'Day 23
- O'Day 240
- O'Day 25
- O'Day 250
- O'Day 26
- O'Day 27
- O'Day 272
- O'Day 28
- O'Day 280
- O'Day 290
- O'Day 30
- O'Day 302
- O'Day 31
- O'Day 32
- O'Day 322
- O'Day 34
- O'Day 35
- O'Day 37
- O'Day 39
- O'Day 40
- Ospray
- Outlaw 26
- Raven
- Rhodes 19
- Sprite 10
- Super Sprite 10
- Super Swift
- Tempest
- Tempest 23
- Widgeon 12
- Wildfire
- Woodpussy
- Yngling

== See also ==
- List of sailboat designers and manufacturers
