= Seafarer 31 =

Seafarer 31 may refer to:

- Seafarer 31 Mark I
- Seafarer 31 Mark II
