= Tripp (surname) =

Tripp is a surname, and may refer to:

- Alan Tripp, American entrepreneur
- Alker Tripp, Assistant Commissioner of the Metropolitan Police
- Art Tripp, percussionist
- Bartlett Tripp, judge and diplomat
- Billy Tripp, outdoor sculptor and poet
- C. A. Tripp, American psychologist
- Charles B. Tripp, the "armless wonder"
- Charles R. H. Tripp, Middle East expert
- Edward Tripp, author of children's books
- Ella Tripp, British badminton player
- Frances Elizabeth Tripp, British botanist
- Georg Tripp, German soccer player and coach
- Graham Tripp, British cricket player
- Herman T. Tripp, American politician
- Howard Tripp, British Roman Catholic bishop
- Ian Tripp, American filmmaker and actor
- Irving Tripp, comics illustrator
- Jack Tripp, British comedian
- James H. Tripp (1832–1917), American politician and banker
- John Tripp (poet), Welsh poet and story writer
- John Tripp (ice hockey), ice hockey player
- John P. Tripp, later John Paul Vann
- June Tripp, British actress
- Laverne Tripp, gospel singer, with Blue Ridge Quartet
- Linda Tripp, figure in the Lewinsky scandal
- Madeline Tripp, also known as Madeline Tourtelot, American artist
- Miles Tripp, British novelist
- Paul Tripp, American musician, author and actor
- Peter Tripp, American radio personality
- Peter Tripp, British diplomat
- Ron Tripp, martial arts practitioner
- Ronald Pearson Tripp, British paleontologist
- Ruth Erskine Tripp (1897–1971), American composer, music critic, and WPA administrator
- Sleepy Tripp, midget race car driver
- Valerie Tripp, author of children's books
- Wallace Tripp, American author and children's book illustrator
- William Tripp, designer of the Invicta (sailboat)
- William Tripp (politician), politician, soldier, surveyor, and lawyer
- William H. Tripp Jr, American yacht designer

== Fiction ==
- Frank Tripp, character on CSI: Miami

== See also ==
- Tripp of Dordrecht, Dutch merchants
- Trippi (surname)
