= Santander 30 =

Sailboat class

Development
- Designer: William H. Tripp Jr.
- Location: United Kingdom
- Year: 1966
- Builder: Dock Plastics
- Role: Racer-Cruiser
- Name: Santander 30

Boat
- Displacement: 9,600 lb (4,354 kg)
- Draft: 4.50 ft (1.37 m)

Hull
- Type: monohull
- Construction: fibreglass
- LOA: 30.33 ft (9.24 m)
- LWL: 20.00 ft (6.10 m)
- Beam: 8.50 ft (2.59 m)
- Engine: inboard motor

Hull appendages
- Keel: modified long keel
- Ballast: 2,450 lb (1,111 kg)
- Rudder: keel-mounted rudder

Rig
- Rig type: Bermuda rig

Sails
- Sailplan: masthead sloop
- Total sail area: 369.00 sq ft (34.281 m^{2})

The Santander 30 is a British sailboat that was designed by American William H. Tripp Jr. as a racer-cruiser and first built in 1966.

The design is a development of the Tripp 30, which was built by Mechans Ltd in the United Kingdom and by Werkspoor in the Netherlands starting in 1963, with 30 boats completed. Seafarer Yachts also imported the Tripp 30 into the United States.

== Production ==
The Santander 30 design was built by Dock Plastics in the United Kingdom, starting in 1966, when the Tripp 30 moulds were moved from the Netherlands.

== Design ==
The Santander 30 is a recreational keelboat, built predominantly of fibreglass, with wood trim. It has a masthead sloop rig. The hull has a spooned raked stem; a raised counter, angled, transom; a keel-mounted rudder controlled by a tiller and a fixed modified long keel. It displaces 9,600 lb (4,354 kg) and carries 2,450 lb (1,111 kg) of ballast.

The boat has a draft of 4.50 ft (1.37 m) with the standard keel and is fitted with an inboard motor for docking and manoeuvring.

The design has a hull speed of 5.99 kn (11.09 km/h).

== See also ==
- List of sailing boat types
