= McCurdy & Rhodes =

Sailboat design firm

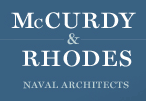
- Company type: Privately held company
- Industry: Boat building
- Founded: 1965
- Founders: James A. McCurdy and Philip ("Bodie") H. Rhodes
- Headquarters: Oyster Bay, New York, United States
- Key people: Chief Designer: Ian A. McCurdy
- Products: Sailboat and powerboat designs
- Website: mccurdyandrhodes.com

McCurdy & Rhodes is an American naval architecture design firm, originally based in Cold Spring Harbor, New York and now located in nearby Oyster Bay, New York. The company specializes in the design of fiberglass sailboats.

The company was founded in 1965 by James A. McCurdy and Philip ("Bodie") H. Rhodes. Rhodes is the son of naval architect Philip L. Rhodes and both company principals got their start at Philip L. Rhodes, Naval Architects and Marine Engineers, where McCurdy was head of the Yacht Design Section and Bodie Rhodes did design work.

== History ==
After its formation, the firm was involved in the design of many boats for Seafarer Yachts in the 1970s and 1980s.

McCurdy's son, Ian A. McCurdy, graduated from Rensselaer Polytechnic Institute with a degree in civil engineering and also graduated from the University of Michigan, with BS and a MS degrees in naval architecture and marine engineering. In 1980, Ian A. McCurdy joined McCurdy & Rhodes from his previous post at the American Bureau of Shipping, where he was an engineer in charge of computer analysis, working on structure and stability of large commercial ships. After this father's death, Ian A. McCurdy became the chief designer.

In the 1980s the firm redesigned Philip L. Rhodes' steel Rhodes 77 for aluminum construction for a single boat built by the Burger Boat Company in Manitowoc, Wisconsin.

The firm has produced more than 100 designs for boats from 22 to 95 ft (6.7 to 29.0 m) length overall, with a focus on off-shore racers.

== Boats ==
Summary of production boats designed by McCurdy & Rhodes:

- Seafarer 31 Mark I – 1968
- Seafarer 29 – 1972
- Seafarer 34 – 1972
- Heritage 35 – 1974
- Seafarer 24 – 1974
- Seafarer 31 Mark II – 1974
- Seafarer 22 – 1976
- Seafarer 23 – 1976
- Seafarer 26 – 1977
- Seafarer 23 Challenger – 1978
- Seafarer 30 – 1978
- Swiftsure 30 – 1978
- Rhodes 77 – 1980s
- Seafarer 37 – 1980
- Hinckley 42 Competition – 1982
- Sou'wester 42/43 – 1982
- Sou'wester 59 – 1959
- Intrepid 35 – 1983
- Sou'wester 51 – 1984
- Navy 44 (M&R) – 1985
- Sou'wester 51 CC – 1986
- Hinckley 43 (McCurdy & Rhodes) – 1990

== See also ==
- List of sailboat designers and manufacturers
