= Polaris 26 =

26-foot keelboat first built in 1960

Development
- Designer: William H. Tripp Jr.
- Location: United States
- Year: 1960
- Builders: Werf Gusto; Seafarer Yachts
- Role: Cruiser

Boat
- Displacement: 4,750 lb (2,155 kg)
- Draft: 6.00 ft (1.83 m) with centerboard down

Hull
- Type: monohull
- Construction: fiberglass
- LOA: 26.25 ft (8.00 m)
- LWL: 19.00 ft (5.79 m)
- Beam: 7.75 ft (2.36 m)
- Engine: inboard motor

Hull appendages
- Keel: modified keel with centerboard
- Rudder: keel-mounted rudder

Rig
- Rig type: Bermuda rig
- I foretriangle height: 28.10 ft (8.56 m)
- J foretriangle base: 9.30 ft (2.83 m)
- P mainsail luff: 24.00 ft (7.32 m)
- E mainsail foot: 12.00 ft (3.66 m)

Sails
- Sailplan: masthead sloop
- Mainsail area: 144.00 sq ft (13.378 m^{2})
- Jib/genoa area: 130.67 sq ft (12.140 m^{2})
- Total sail area: 274.67 sq ft (25.518 m^{2})

The Polaris 26 is an American trailerable sailboat that was designed by William H. Tripp Jr. as a cruiser and first built in 1960.

The Polaris 26 is very similar to Tripp's 1963 Sailmaster 26 design.

== Production ==
The design was built by Werf Gusto in the Netherlands, starting in 1960 and imported into the United States by Seafarer Yachts. It was later produced by Seafarer Yachts in their factory in Huntington, New York, but it is now out of production.

== Design ==
The Polaris 26 is a recreational keelboat, built predominantly of fiberglass, with wood trim. It has a masthead sloop rig with wooden spars. The hull has a spooned, raked stem; raised counter, angled transom, a keel-mounted rudder controlled by a tiller and a fixed, modified long keel, with a cutaway forefoot and a retractable centerboard. It displaces 4,750 lb (2,155 kg).

The boat has a draft of 6.00 ft (1.83 m) with the centerboard extended and 2.18 ft (0.66 m) with it retracted, allowing operation in shallow water or ground transportation on a trailer.

The boat is fitted with an inboard engine for docking and maneuvering.

The design has sleeping accommodation for four people, with a double "V"-berth in the bow cabin and two straight settee berths in the main cabin around a drop-leaf table. The galley is located on both sides of the companionway ladder. The head is located centered in the bow cabin, underneath the "V"-berth.

The design has a hull speed of 5.84 kn (10.82 km/h).

== See also ==
- List of sailing boat types
