= Trippi (surname) =

Trippi is a surname. Notable people with the surname include:

- Charley Trippi (1921–2022), American football player
- Joe Trippi (born 1956), American political strategist
- Peter Trippi, American magazine editor, art critic, and biographer

== See also ==
- Tripi (disambiguation), includes people with surname Tripi
- Trippy (disambiguation), includes people with surname Trippy
- Tripp (surname)
