= Trippi =

Trippi may refer to:

- Trippi (album), album by Finnish singer Sanni Kurkisuo
- Trippi (surname)

== See also ==
- Tripi (disambiguation)
- Trippie Redd (born 1999), American rapper
- Trippy (disambiguation)
