= Block Island 40 =

Sailboat class

Block Island 40 (Vitesse 40)

Development
- Designer: William Tripp, Jr.
- Location: United States
- Year: 1957–2000
- No. built: 22 (Mark I); 14 (Mark II); 17+ (Mark III)
- Builders: Mark I: American Boatbuilding Corporation, Beetle Boat Division; Mark II: Metalmast Marine; Mark III: Migrator Yachts
- Role: Racer-Cruiser

Boat
- Displacement: 20,000 lb (9,072 kg)
- Draft: Mark I: 3.92 ft (1.19 m), centerboard up; 8.42 ft (2.57 m), centerboard down; Mark III: 4.16 ft (1.27 m), centerboard up; 8.83 ft (2.69 m), centerboard down

Hull
- Type: Monohull
- Construction: Fiberglass
- LOA: 40.0 ft (12.2 m)
- LWL: 29.16 ft (8.89 m)
- Beam: 11.83 ft (3.61 m)

Hull appendages
- Keel: full keel with centerboard
- Ballast: Mark I: 5,200 lb (2,359 kg); Mark III: 7,800 lb (3,538 kg)
- Rudder: keel-mounted rudder

Rig
- Rig type: Yawl rig
- I foretriangle height: 46.83 ft (14.27 m)
- J foretriangle base: 25.58 ft (7.80 m)
- P mainsail luff: 39.50 ft (12.04 m)
- E mainsail foot: 15.0 ft (4.6 m)

Sails
- Sailplan: Masthead yawl
- Total sail area: Mark I: 752 sq ft (69.9 m^{2}); Mark III: 738 sq ft (68.6 m^{2})

Rating
- PHRF: 156–186

The Block Island 40, also known as the Vitesse 40, is an American sailboat that was designed by William Tripp, Jr. in 1956–1957 and first built in 1957.

== Production ==
Three versions of the Block Island 40 were built: Mark I, built by the Beetle Boat division of American Boatbuilding Corporation from 1957 to the early 1960s, Mark II, built by Metalmast Marine from 1974 to 1977, and Mark III, built by Migrator Yachts from 1985 to at least 2000.

The Block Island 40 design was modified by Tripp for Hinckley Yachts and sold as the Bermuda 40.

== Design ==
The design was originally commissioned in 1956 for a Connecticut lawyer named Frederick Lorenzen, who said of wooden boats of the time, "I don't like them. They leak." The design is said to be inspired by the Sparkman & Stephens yacht Finisterre. The design is one of the first fiberglass production sailboats built.

The design features a yawl sail plan, six berths, and over 6.0 ft (183 cm) of headroom ("standing headroom throughout"). A centerboard allowed for a minimum draft of 3 ft 11 in (1.2 m) that extended to 8 ft 15 in (2.8 m) when lowered.

== Variants ==
=== Vitesse 40 / Mark I (1957-early 1960s) ===
Initially, a Dutch company, Van Breems International (VBI), was to build Tripp's design as the Vitesse 40. VBI never built a hull, and sold the rights to American Boatbuilding Corporation in 1957. The Mark I was first known as the Vitesse 40 and later, with some modifications, renamed the Block Island 40. As late as 1961, references to the Vitesse 40 were still found in VBI promotional materials. The Beetle Boat Division of American Boatbuilding Corporation built a total of 22 hulls of the Mark I design.

=== Mark II (1974–1977) ===
Metalmast Marine made significant changes to the design, including changes to the stern, coachroof, rudder, centerboard, and keel. The keel and rudder were separated, in contrast to the full keel featured on the Mark I and Mark III. Metalmast built 14 hulls of the Mark II design.

=== Mark III (1985-early 2000s) ===
In 1985, Eric Woods attempted to get Metalmast Marine to build him a customized Block Island 40. Metalmast declined and instead sold him the molds. Woods founded Migrator Yachts and created the Mark III iteration. Migrator built at least 17 hulls of the Mark III design as of 2000.

== Operational history ==
The Block Island 40 found success in racing, with early wins in the 1958 Miami to Nassau race by Rhubarb and the 1958 Edlu Trophy by Frederick Lorenzen's Seal.

Six Block Island 40s participated in the 1960 Newport to Bermuda race, all placing in the top 11. Hull No. 8, Alaris, won its class in the 1978 edition of the same race. Hull No. 7, Bantu, won the Chicago to Mackinac Race overall in 1964, 1965, 1996, and 1997.

A 1962 advertisement by American Boatbuilding Corporation references wins by Reindeer in the Annapolis to Newport Race and Marblehead to Halifax Ocean Race; Swamp Yankee in the New Bedford Whalers Race and Martha's Vineyard Ocean Race; Volta in the Newport to Cuttyhunk Race; Scylla in the Storm Trysail Race, and Alaris in the Chesapeake Bay Fall Series, but does not specify the years.
