= Seafarer 46 =

Sailboat class

Development
- Designer: Sparkman & Stephens
- Location: United States
- Year: 1967
- Builder: Seafarer Yachts
- Role: Cruiser
- Name: Seafarer 46

Boat
- Displacement: 27,000 lb (12,247 kg)
- Draft: 6.50 ft (1.98 m)

Hull
- Type: monohull
- Construction: fiberglass
- LOA: 46.00 ft (14.02 m)
- LWL: 31.00 ft (9.45 m)
- Beam: 11.00 ft (3.35 m)
- Engine: Universal 70 hp (52 kW) diesel engine

Hull appendages
- Keel: fin keel
- Ballast: 11,250 lb (5,103 kg)
- Rudder: skeg-mounted/internally-mounted spade-type/transom-mounted rudder

Rig
- Rig type: Bermuda rig
- I foretriangle height: 51.25 ft (15.62 m)
- J foretriangle base: 17.25 ft (5.26 m)
- P mainsail luff: 45.40 ft (13.84 m)
- E mainsail foot: 19.11 ft (5.82 m)

Sails
- Sailplan: masthead yawl
- Mainsail area: 433.80 sq ft (40.301 m^{2})
- Jib/genoa area: 442.03 sq ft (41.066 m^{2})
- Total sail area: 875.83 sq ft (81.367 m^{2})

The Seafarer 46 is an American sailboat that was designed by Sparkman & Stephens as a cruiser and first built in 1967.

The Seafarer 46 is probably a development of the Seafarer 45.

== Production ==
The design was built by Seafarer Yachts in the United States, starting in 1967, but it is now out of production.

The boat was offered complete and ready-to-sail, or in various stages of completion.

== Design ==
The Seafarer 46 is a recreational keelboat, built predominantly of fiberglass, with wood trim. It has a masthead yawl rig or optional masthead sloop rig, with a fixed fin keel. It displaces 27,000 lb (12,247 kg) and carries 12,250 lb (5,557 kg) of lead ballast.

The boat has a draft of 6.50 ft (1.98 m) with the standard keel.

The boat is fitted with a Universal 70 hp (52 kW) diesel engine for docking and maneuvering.

The design has a hull speed of 7.46 kn (13.82 km/h).

== See also ==
- List of sailing boat types
