= Seafarer Bahama 35 MS =

Sailboat class

Development
- Designer: Philip Rhodes
- Location: United States
- Year: 1960
- Builder: de Vries Lentsch
- Role: Cruiser
- Name: Seafarer Bahama 35 MS

Boat
- Displacement: 12,500 lb (5,670 kg)
- Draft: 4.50 ft (1.37 m)

Hull
- Type: monohull
- Construction: fiberglass
- LOA: 35.00 ft (10.67 m)
- LWL: 25.25 ft (7.70 m)
- Beam: 10.50 ft (3.20 m)
- Engine: Universal 70 hp (52 kW) inboard motor

Hull appendages
- Keel: long keel
- Ballast: 4,200 lb (1,905 kg)

Rig
- Rig type: Bermuda rig

Sails
- Sailplan: masthead sloop
- Total sail area: 484.00 sq ft (44.965 m^{2})

The Seafarer Bahama 35 MS is a Dutch sailboat that was designed by American naval architect Philip Rhodes as a cruiser and first built in 1960. It was Rhodes' design #702.

The design was developed by Seafarer Yachts into the Seafarer 38C in 1972.

== Production ==
The design was built by de Vries Lentsch in the Netherlands starting in 1960 and Seafarer Yachts imported it in the United States. It is now out of production.

== Design ==
The Seafarer Bahama 35 MS is a recreational keelboat, built predominantly of fiberglass, with wood trim. It has a masthead sloop rig, an angled transom, a rudder controlled by a wheel and a fixed long keel. It displaces 12,500 lb (5,670 kg) and carries 4,200 lb (1,905 kg) of lead ballast.

The boat has a draft of 4.50 ft (1.37 m) with the standard keel.

The boat is fitted with a Universal 70 hp (52 kW) inboard engine for docking and maneuvering. The fuel tank holds 60 U.S. gallons (230 L; 50 imp gal) and the fresh water tank has a capacity of 110 U.S. gallons (420 L; 92 imp gal).

The design has a hull speed of 6.87 kn (12.72 km/h).

== See also ==
- List of sailing boat types
