= Heritage 35 =

Sailboat class

Development
- Designer: McCurdy & Rhodes
- Location: Canada
- Year: 1974
- No. built: 14
- Builder: Heritage Yacht Builders
- Role: Cruiser
- Name: Heritage 35

Boat
- Displacement: 13,700 lb (6,214 kg)
- Draft: 5.50 ft (1.68 m)

Hull
- Type: monohull
- Construction: fibreglass
- LOA: 36.08 ft (11.00 m)
- LWL: 26.62 ft (8.11 m)
- Beam: 10.17 ft (3.10 m)
- Engine: Westerbeke MG1500 diesel engine

Hull appendages
- Keel: fin keel
- Ballast: 6,250 lb (2,835 kg)
- Rudder: skeg-mounted/internally-mounted spade-type/transom-mounted rudder

Rig
- Rig type: Bermuda rig
- I foretriangle height: 42.80 ft (13.05 m)
- J foretriangle base: 14.30 ft (4.36 m)
- P mainsail luff: 37.30 ft (11.37 m)
- E mainsail foot: 13.40 ft (4.08 m)

Sails
- Sailplan: masthead sloop
- Mainsail area: 249.91 sq ft (23.217 m^{2})
- Jib/genoa area: 306.02 sq ft (28.430 m^{2})
- Total sail area: 555.93 sq ft (51.648 m^{2})

The Heritage 35 is a Canadian sailboat that was designed by Americans McCurdy & Rhodes as a cruiser and first built in 1974.

== Production ==
The design was built by Heritage Yacht Builders in Oakdale, Ontario, Canada. The company built 14 boats between 1974 and 1977. The moulds were then purchased by Grampian Marine of Oakville, Ontario, but that company went out of business later in 1977, before producing any boats.

The Heritage 35 design was later developed into the Intrepid 35, using the same tooling and moulds.

== Design ==
The Heritage 35 is a recreational keelboat, built predominantly of fibreglass, with wood trim. It has a masthead sloop rig; a raked stem; a raised counter, reverse transom; a skeg-mounted rudder controlled by a tiller and a fixed fin keel. It displaces 13,700 lb (6,214 kg) and carries 6,250 lb (2,835 kg) of ballast.

The boat has a draft of 5.50 ft (1.68 m) with the standard keel.

The boat is fitted with a Westerbeke MG1500 diesel engine for docking and manoeuvring. The fuel tank holds 40 U.S. gallons (150 L; 33 imp gal) and the fresh water tank has a capacity of 125 U.S. gallons (470 L; 104 imp gal).

The design has sleeping accommodation for five people, with a double "V"-berth in the bow cabin, two straight settee berths in the main cabin and an aft berth on the port side. The galley is located on the starboard side just forward of the companionway ladder. The galley is L-shaped and is equipped with a stove, an ice box and a sink. A navigation station is opposite the galley, on the port side. The head is located just aft of the bow cabin on the port side.

The design has a hull speed of 6.91 kn (12.80 km/h).

== See also ==
- List of sailing boat types
