= Sou'wester 51 =

Sailboat class

Development
- Designer: McCurdy & Rhodes
- Location: United States
- Year: 1984
- Builder: Hinckley Yachts
- Role: Racer-Cruiser
- Name: Sou'wester 51

Boat
- Displacement: 44,000 lb (19,958 kg)
- Draft: 11.08 ft (3.38 m) with centerboard down

Hull
- Type: monohull
- Construction: fiberglass
- LOA: 51.16 ft (15.59 m)
- LWL: 37.50 ft (11.43 m)
- Beam: 14.08 ft (4.29 m)
- Engine: inboard engine

Hull appendages
- Keel: fin keel
- Ballast: 15,040 lb (6,822 kg)
- Rudder: skeg-mounted rudder

Rig
- Rig type: Bermuda rig
- I foretriangle height: 65.00 ft (19.81 m)
- J foretriangle base: 20.20 ft (6.16 m)
- P mainsail luff: 56.90 ft (17.34 m)
- E mainsail foot: 20.50 ft (6.25 m)

Sails
- Sailplan: masthead sloop
- Mainsail area: 583.23 sq ft (54.184 m^{2})
- Jib/genoa area: 656.50 sq ft (60.991 m^{2})
- Total sail area: 1,239.73 sq ft (115.175 m^{2})

The Sou'wester 51 is an American sailboat that was designed by McCurdy & Rhodes as a racer-cruiser and first built in 1984.

The Sou'wester 51 design was developed into the center cockpit Sou'wester 51 CC in 1986. The 1991 Sou'wester 52 also used the same hull design.

== Production ==
The design was built by Hinckley Yachts in the United States, starting in 1984, but it is now out of production.

== Design ==
The Sou'wester 51 is a recreational keelboat, built predominantly of fiberglass, with wood trim. It has a masthead sloop rig, a raked stem; a raised counter, angled transom; a skeg-mounted rudder controlled by a wheel and a fixed fin keel with a retractable centerboard. It displaces 44,000 lb (19,958 kg) and carries 15,040 lb (6,822 kg) of lead ballast.

A short mast version was also available.

The boat has a draft of 11.08 ft (3.38 m) with the centerboard extended and 5.92 ft (1.80 m) with it retracted, allowing operation in shallow water. The boat is fitted with an inboard engine for docking and maneuvering.

The design has sleeping accommodation for four people, with a double berth in the bow cabin and an aft cabin with a double berth on the port side. The galley is located on the port side just forward of the companionway ladder. The galley is U-shaped and is equipped with a four-burner stove, an ice box and a double sink. A navigation station is opposite the galley, on the starboard side. There are two heads, one just aft of the bow cabin on the port side and one on the starboard side in the aft cabin.

The design has a hull speed of 8.21 kn (15.20 km/h).

== Operational history ==
The Sou'wester 51 won a number of races, including the Edgartown Race Week, the Halifax Race, as well as the Bermuda Race and the New York Yacht Club Annual Cruise.

== See also ==
- List of sailing boat types
