= Javelin 38 =

Sailboat class

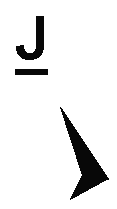

Development
- Designer: William H. Tripp Jr.
- Location: United States
- Year: 1960
- No. built: about 25
- Builder: de Vries Lentsch
- Role: Cruiser

Boat
- Displacement: 16,000 lb (7,257 kg)
- Draft: 5.25 ft (1.60 m)

Hull
- Type: monohull
- Construction: fiberglass
- LOA: 37.83 ft (11.53 m)
- LWL: 25.00 ft (7.62 m)
- Beam: 10.00 ft (3.05 m)
- Engine: Universal Atomic 4 20 hp (15 kW) gasoline engine

Hull appendages
- Keel: fin keel
- Ballast: 4,760 lb (2,159 kg)

Rig
- Rig type: Bermuda rig
- I foretriangle height: 40.66 ft (12.39 m)
- J foretriangle base: 13.75 ft (4.19 m)
- P mainsail luff: 35.00 ft (10.67 m)
- E mainsail foot: 17.00 ft (5.18 m)

Sails
- Sailplan: masthead sloop
- Mainsail area: 297.50 sq ft (27.639 m^{2})
- Jib/genoa area: 279.54 sq ft (25.970 m^{2})
- Total sail area: 577.04 sq ft (53.609 m^{2})

The Javelin 38 is a Dutch sailboat that was designed by American naval architect William H. Tripp Jr. as a cruiser and first built in 1960.

== Production ==
The design was built by de Vries Lentsch from 1960 until 1966, with about 25 boats completed, but it is now out of production. Most of the boats produced were imported into the United States by Seafarer Yachts.

== Design ==
The Javelin 38 is a recreational keelboat, built predominantly of fiberglass, with wood trim. It has a masthead sloop rig with 577 sq ft (53.6 m^{2}) of sail. The hull has a spooned, raked stem; a raised counter, plumb transom and a fixed fin keel. A few boats were built with a yawl rig with 633 sq ft (58.8 m^{2}) of sail. It displaces 16,000 lb (7,257 kg) and carries 4,760 lb (2,159 kg) of ballast.

The boat has a draft of 5.25 ft (1.60 m) with the standard keel.

The boat is fitted with a Universal Atomic 4 20 hp (15 kW) gasoline engine for docking and maneuvering. The fuel tank holds 35 U.S. gallons (130 L; 29 imp gal) and the fresh water tank has a capacity of 100 U.S. gallons (380 L; 83 imp gal).

The design has a hull speed of 6.7 kn (12.4 km/h).

== See also ==
- List of sailing boat types
