= Sailmaster 22 =

1960s recreational keelboat

Development
- Designer: Sparkman & Stephens
- Location: Netherlands; United States
- Year: 1963
- Builders: Werf Gusto; De Vries Lentsch; Seafarer Yachts

Boat
- Displacement: 3,650 lb (1,656 kg)
- Draft: 5.90 ft (1.80 m) with centerboard down

Hull
- Type: monohull
- Construction: fiberglass
- LOA: 22.00 ft (6.71 m)
- LWL: 16.50 ft (5.03 m)
- Beam: 7.00 ft (2.13 m)
- Engine: outboard motor

Hull appendages
- Keel: stub long keel with centerboard
- Ballast: 1,400 lb (635 kg)
- Rudder: keel-mounted rudder

Rig
- Rig type: Bermuda rig
- I foretriangle height: 26.80 ft (8.17 m)
- J foretriangle base: 7.60 ft (2.32 m)
- P mainsail luff: 23.10 ft (7.04 m)
- E mainsail foot: 11.00 ft (3.35 m)

Sails
- Sailplan: masthead sloop
- Mainsail area: 127.05 sq ft (11.803 m^{2})
- Jib/genoa area: 101.84 sq ft (9.461 m^{2})
- Total sail area: 228.89 sq ft (21.265 m^{2})

Racing
- PHRF: 288

The Sailmaster 22 is a recreational keelboat designed by Sparkman & Stephens and first built in 1963. It was Sparkman & Stephens design #1743. The design was developed into the Seafarer 23 Kestrel in 1963.

== Production ==
The boat was initially built in the Netherlands by Werf Gusto in Schiedam and De Vries Lentsch in Amsterdam and imported into the United States by Seafarer Fiberglass Yachts of New York City and then by Sailmaster of Annapolis, Maryland. Production was moved to Seafarer Yachts in Huntington, New York in about 1965, who build the boats in a re-purposed supermarket. The design is now out of production.

== Design ==
The Sailmaster 22 is built predominantly of solid hand-laid fiberglass, with wood trim. The spars were originally sitka spruce. It has a masthead sloop rig, a raked stem plumb stem, a raised counter transom, a keel-mounted rudder controlled by a tiller and a fixed stub long keel with a retractable steel centerboard. It displaces 3,650 lb (1,656 kg) and carries 1,400 lb (635 kg) of iron ballast.

The boat has a draft of 5.90 ft (1.80 m) with the centerboard extended and 2.33 ft (0.71 m) with it retracted, allowing operation in shallow water or ground transportation on a trailer.

The boat is normally fitted with a small 3 to 6 hp (2 to 4 kW) outboard motor mounted in a lazarette locker, for docking and maneuvering.

The design has sleeping accommodation for two people, with a double "V"-berth in the bow cabin. The galley is located on both sides just forward of the companionway ladder. The galley is equipped with a two-burner stove to starboard and a sink and icebox to port. Cabin headroom is 53 in (135 cm).

The design has a PHRF racing average handicap of 288 and a hull speed of 5.4 kn (10.0 km/h).

== Variants ==
Sailmaster 22 D
Daysailer model with a smaller cabin and larger cockpit.
Sailmaster 22 W
Weekender model with a bigger cabin and smaller cockpit.

== Reception ==
In a 2010 review Steve Henkel wrote, "best features: We like the big, comfortable cockpit and the space below devoted to accommodations for only two rather than for the usual four. We also like the classic style and elegance, including the beautifully varnished clear spruce spars and wood trim when the boats were new. Worst features: We wouldn't like the chores of sanding and varnishing all that wood and of maintaining the steel centerboard, which tends to corrode around its pivot point."

In a 2017 used boat review Jack Hornor wrote in The SpinSheet, "With a displacement/length ratio of 362 and a sail area/displacement ration of 15.9, the Sailmaster 22, as one would expect, needs a bit of a breeze (preferably better than six knots true) to get her going. The Sailmaster is always a balanced and responsive handler. However, with the full keel and attached rudder, the 22 will not respond or tack as quickly as a fin keel-spade rudder design. Performance improves noticeably as the wind picks up, and the 22 tracks well and is easily balanced."
