= Navy 44 (M&R) =

Sailboat class

Development
- Designer: McCurdy & Rhodes
- Location: United States
- Year: 1985
- No. built: 20
- Builder: Tillotson Pearson
- Role: Sail training
- Name: Navy 44

Boat
- Displacement: 28,500 lb (12,927 kg)
- Draft: 7.25 ft (2.21 m)

Hull
- Type: monohull
- Construction: fiberglass
- LOA: 44.00 ft (13.41 m)
- LWL: 34.61 ft (10.55 m)
- Beam: 12.33 ft (3.76 m)
- Engine: Westerbeke diesel engine

Hull appendages
- Keel: fin keel
- Rudder: skeg-mounted rudder

Rig
- Rig type: Bermuda rig
- I foretriangle height: 58.25 ft (17.75 m)
- J foretriangle base: 18.63 ft (5.68 m)
- P mainsail luff: 50.50 ft (15.39 m)
- E mainsail foot: 16.00 ft (4.88 m)

Sails
- Sailplan: masthead sloop
- Mainsail area: 404.00 sq ft (37.533 m^{2})
- Jib/genoa area: 542.60 sq ft (50.409 m^{2})
- Total sail area: 946.00 sq ft (87.886 m^{2})

The Navy 44 (M&R) is an American sailboat that was designed by McCurdy & Rhodes for the US Navy for sail training at the United States Naval Academy and built in 1985.

The design was originally built by the manufacturer as the Navy 44, but is now usually referred to as the Navy 44 (M&R) or Mark I to differentiate it from the unrelated 1963 Alfred E. Luders designed Annapolis 44 which it replaced and the David Pedrick Navy 44 Mark II design which superseded it.

== Production ==
The design was built by Tillotson Pearson in the United States, with 20 boats built, all of them in 1985.

== Design ==
The Navy 44 is a training keelboat, built predominantly of fiberglass, with wood trim. It has a rig, a raked stem, a reverse transom, a skeg-mounted rudder controlled by a wheel and a fixed fin keel. It displaces 28,500 lb (12,927 kg).

The boat has a draft of 7.25 ft (2.21 m) with the standard keel. It is fitted with a Westerbeke diesel engine for docking and maneuvering.

The design has sleeping accommodation for seven people, with two single berths in the bow cabin, two straight settee berths and two pilot berths in the main cabin and an aft cabin with a single berth on the starboard side. The galley is located on the starboard side just forward of the companionway ladder. The galley is L-shaped and is equipped with a three-burner stove, an ice box and a double sink. A navigation station is opposite the galley, on the port side. The head is located on the port side of the companionway.

The design has a hull speed of 7.88 kn (14.59 km/h).

== See also ==
- List of sailing boat types
