= Tripp 30 =

Sailboat class

Development
- Designer: William H. Tripp Jr.
- Location: United States
- Year: 1963
- No. built: 30
- Builders: Mechans Ltd; Werkspoor
- Role: Racer-Cruiser
- Name: Tripp 30

Boat
- Displacement: 9,600 lb (4,354 kg)
- Draft: 4.50 ft (1.37 m)

Hull
- Type: monohull
- Construction: fiberglass
- LOA: 30.33 ft (9.24 m)
- LWL: 20.00 ft (6.10 m)
- Beam: 8.50 ft (2.59 m)
- Engine: Universal Atomic 4 30 hp (22 kW) gasoline engine

Hull appendages
- Keel: modified long keel
- Ballast: 2,900 lb (1,315 kg)
- Rudder: keel-mounted rudder

Rig
- Rig type: Bermuda rig

Sails
- Sailplan: masthead sloop
- Total sail area: 369.00 sq ft (34.281 m^{2})

The Tripp 30 is a sailboat that was designed by American William H. Tripp Jr. as a racer-cruiser and first built in 1963.

== Production ==
The design was built by Mechans Ltd in the United Kingdom and by Werkspoor in the Netherlands starting in 1963, with 30 boats completed. Seafarer Yachts also imported the boat into the United States.

The design's molds were later moved to the United Kingdom. The design was developed into the Santander 30 in 1966 and produced by Dock Plastics.

== Design ==
The Tripp 30 is a recreational keelboat, built predominantly of fiberglass, with wood trim. It has a masthead sloop rig or optional yawl rig, with sitka spruce spars. The hull has a spooned raked stem; a raised counter, angled, transom; a keel-mounted rudder controlled by a tiller and a fixed modified long keel. It displaces 9,600 lb (4,354 kg) and carries 2,900 lb (1,315 kg) of lead ballast.

The boat has a draft of 4.50 ft (1.37 m) with the standard keel.

The boat is fitted with a Universal Atomic 4 30 hp (22 kW) gasoline engine for docking and maneuvering. The fuel tank holds 20 U.S. gallons (76 L; 17 imp gal) and the fresh water tank has a capacity of 30 U.S. gallons (110 L; 25 imp gal).

The design has sleeping accommodation for four people, with a double "V"-berth in the bow cabin and two straight settee berths in the main cabin. The galley is located on both sides of the companionway ladder. The galley is equipped with a two-burner stove to starboard and an ice box and sink to port. The head is located just aft of the bow cabin on the port side.

The design has a hull speed of 5.99 kn (11.09 km/h).

== See also ==
- List of sailing boat types
