= Sou'wester 51 CC =

Sailboat class

Development
- Designer: McCurdy & Rhodes
- Location: United States
- Year: 1986
- Builder: Hinckley Yachts
- Role: Racer-Cruiser
- Name: Sou'wester 51 CC

Boat
- Displacement: 44,000 lb (19,958 kg)
- Draft: 11.00 ft (3.35 m) with centerboard down

Hull
- Type: monohull
- Construction: fiberglass
- LOA: 51.16 ft (15.59 m)
- LWL: 37.50 ft (11.43 m)
- Beam: 14.08 ft (4.29 m)
- Engine: inboard motor

Hull appendages
- Keel: fin keel and centerboard
- Ballast: 15,000 lb (6,804 kg)

Rig
- Rig type: Bermuda rig

Sails
- Sailplan: masthead sloop
- Total sail area: 1,226.00 sq ft (113.899 m^{2})

The Sou'wester 51 CC is an American sailboat that was designed by McCurdy & Rhodes as a racer-cruiser and first built in 1986.

The Sou'wester 51 CC is a center cockpit development of the Sou'wester 51.

== Production ==
The design was built by Hinckley Yachts in the United States, starting in 1986, but it is now out of production.

== Design ==
The Sou'wester 51 CC is a recreational keelboat, built predominantly of fiberglass, with wood trim. It has a masthead sloop rig; a raked stem; a raised counter, angled transom, a rudder controlled by a wheel and a fixed fin keel with a retractable centerboard. A fin keel and a shoal draft Sheel keel were both factory options. The boat displaces 44,000 lb (19,958 kg) and carries 15,000 lb (6,804 kg) of lead ballast.

The boat has a draft of 11.00 ft (3.35 m) with the centerboard extended and 5.83 ft (1.78 m) with it retracted, allowing operation in shallow water. It is fitted with a inboard engine for docking and maneuvering.

The design has sleeping accommodation for eight people, with a double "V"-berth in the bow cabin, an U-shaped settee with a drop-down table and a straight settee in the main cabin and two aft cabins with a double berth on the starboard side and a single berth on the port side. The galley is located on the starboard side just aft of the companionway ladder. The galley is equipped with a three-burner stove, an ice box and a double sink. A navigation station is opposite the galley, on the port side. There are two heads, one just aft of the bow cabin on the port side and one on the port side in the aft cabin. Both have showers.

The design has a hull speed of 8.21 kn (15.20 km/h).

== See also ==
- List of sailing boat types
