= Meridian 25 =

Sailboat class

- M

Development
- Designer: Philip Rhodes
- Location: Netherlands/United States
- Year: 1960
- Builders: De Vries Lentsch; Seafarer Yachts
- Role: Cruiser

Boat
- Displacement: 5,070 lb (2,300 kg)
- Draft: 3.25 ft (0.99 m)

Hull
- Type: monohull
- Construction: fiberglass
- LOA: 24.75 ft (7.54 m)
- LWL: 17.50 ft (5.33 m)
- Beam: 7.00 ft (2.13 m)
- Engine: outboard motor or inboard motor

Hull appendages
- Keel: modified long keel
- Ballast: 2,491 lb (1,130 kg)
- Rudder: keel-mounted rudder

Rig
- Rig type: Bermuda rig
- I foretriangle height: 29.13 ft (8.88 m)
- J foretriangle base: 9.71 ft (2.96 m)
- P mainsail luff: 25.25 ft (7.70 m)
- E mainsail foot: 10.75 ft (3.28 m)

Sails
- Sailplan: masthead sloop
- Mainsail area: 135.72 sq ft (12.609 m^{2})
- Jib/genoa area: 141.43 sq ft (13.139 m^{2})
- Total sail area: 277.14 sq ft (25.747 m^{2})

Racing
- PHRF: 252

The Meridian 25 is a Dutch and American built trailerable sailboat that was designed by American Philip Rhodes as a cruiser and first built in 1960.

== Production ==
The design was initially built in 1960 by the Amsterdam, Netherlands shipyard De Vries Lentsch, with some of these boats imported into the United States. The de Vries Lentsch Meridian 25 was available in three models: the Bermuda, Macinac and the Vinyard. Later, Seafarer Yachts in Huntington, New York, United States introduced a new version of the design, although it is now out of production. Due to the preponderance of models built, the boats finished vary in layout, equipment and details considerably.

== Design ==
The Meridian 25 is a recreational keelboat, built predominantly of fiberglass, with wood trim. It has a masthead sloop rig; a spooned, raked stem, a raised counter, angled transom; a keel-hung rudder controlled by a tiller and a fixed, modified long keel, with a cutaway forefoot. It displaces 5,070 lb (2,300 kg) and carries 2,491 lb (1,130 kg) of lead ballast.

The boat is normally fitted with a small 6 to 10 hp (4 to 7 kW) well-mounted outboard motor for docking and maneuvering. All models also had an inboard motor as a factory option.

The design has sleeping accommodation for four people, with a double "V"-berth in the bow cabin and two straight settee berths in the main cabin. The galley is located on both sides of the companionway ladder with a single-burner stove to starboard that slides after when not in use, an icebox under the steps and above the inboard engine, and a sink to port. The head is located in the bow cabin under the "V"-berth. Cabin headroom is 68 in (173 cm) and the fresh water tank has a capacity of 24 U.S. gallons (91 L; 20 imp gal).

The design has a PHRF racing average handicap of 252 and a hull speed of 5.6 kn (10.4 km/h).

== Operational history ==
In a 2010 review Steve Henkel wrote, "the first Meridians were imported from De Vries Lentsch, a well established Dutch yard. Later they were built at the Seafarer plant in Huntington, NY, on Long Island. Like many boats from the board of Philip Rhodes, she is pretty to look at, but because of her relatively narrow beam, slack bilges, and shallow ballast location, she is also relatively tender in a breeze, has a tendency to hobbyhorse in a chop, and has little elbow room below. Best features: The large windows in her doghouse help to allay any crew claustrophobia despite the narrow confines of the cabin. Worst features: The optional Kermath 10 hp Sea Twin inboard was mounted so low in the bilge that servicing (especially oil change) was extra difficult, and any casual bilge water that collects can corrode the crankcase and engine block. Also, the icebox sits immediately above the engine. As a consequence, despite three inches of insulation, the icebox's efficiency is badly compromised."

== See also ==
- List of sailing boat types
