= Swiftsure 33 =

Sailboat class

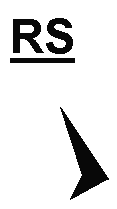

Development
- Designer: Philip Rhodes
- Location: United States
- Year: 1959
- No. built: 150
- Builders: deVries Lentch; Royal Netherlands Aircraft
- Role: Cruiser
- Name: Swiftsure 33

Boat
- Displacement: 11,500 lb (5,216 kg)
- Draft: 6.58 ft (2.01 m)

Hull
- Type: monohull
- Construction: fiberglass
- LOA: 33.08 ft (10.08 m)
- LWL: 22.92 ft (6.99 m)
- Beam: 10.00 ft (3.05 m)
- Engine: Universal Atomic 4 30 hp (22 kW) gasoline engine

Hull appendages
- Keel: modified long keel with centerboard
- Ballast: 3,400 lb (1,542 kg)
- Rudder: skeg-mounted/internally-mounted spade-type/transom-mounted rudder

Rig
- Rig type: Bermuda rig
- I foretriangle height: 38.73 ft (11.80 m)
- J foretriangle base: 12.87 ft (3.92 m)
- P mainsail luff: 34.18 ft (10.42 m)
- E mainsail foot: 14.70 ft (4.48 m)

Sails
- Sailplan: masthead sloop
- Mainsail area: 251.22 sq ft (23.339 m^{2})
- Jib/genoa area: 249.23 sq ft (23.154 m^{2})
- Total sail area: 500.45 sq ft (46.493 m^{2})

The Swiftsure 33 is a Dutch sailboat that was designed by American naval architect Philip Rhodes as cruiser and first built in 1959.

== Production ==
The design was initially built by de Vries Lentsch and later by Royal Netherlands Aircraft, both in the Netherlands, from 1959 until 1965, with 150 boats completed. It was imported into the United States by Seafarer Yachts.

== Design ==
The Swiftsure 33 is a recreational keelboat, built predominantly of fiberglass, with wood trim. It has a masthead sloop rig; a spooned, raked stem; a raised counter, angled transom; a keel-hung rudder controlled by a tiller and a modified, fixed, long keel, with a cutaway forefoot and a retractable centerboard. It displaces 11,500 lb (5,216 kg) and carries 3,400 lb (1,542 kg) of ballast.

The boat has a draft of 6.58 ft (2.01 m) with the centerboard extended and 3.50 ft (1.07 m) with it retracted, allowing operation in shallow water.

The boat is fitted with a Universal Atomic 4 30 hp (22 kW) gasoline engine for docking and maneuvering. The fuel tank holds 28 U.S. gallons (110 L; 23 imp gal) and the fresh water tank has a capacity of 60 U.S. gallons (230 L; 50 imp gal).

The design has sleeping accommodation for six people, with a double "V"-berth in the bow cabin and two straight settee berths and two pilot berths in the main cabin around a dining table. The galley is located on both sides of the companionway ladder. The galley is equipped with a two-burner stove and a sink to port and an ice box to starboard. The head is located just aft of the bow cabin on the port side and includes a sink.

The design was built in two different models, the Swiftsure 33 and the Commodore Swiftsure, with different trim and slightly different displacements and ballast. The earlier boats built by deVries Lentch have a fixed main cabin table that is permanently fixed in place, with drop-leaves. The table has a vertical hollow steel tube running though the aft end, which houses the centerboard control cable. In the later Commodore Swiftsure model, mostly built by Royal Netherlands Aircraft, the table folds and stows away and the centerboard control cable is routed though the port cabin cabinets. The earlier boats have bronze deck hardware, while the Commodore Swiftsure model has a mix of stainless steel and aluminum hardware, with teak trim.

The design has a hull speed of 6.42 kn (11.89 km/h).

== See also ==
- List of sailing boat types
