= Hinckley 42 Competition =

Sailboat class

Development
- Designer: McCurdy & Rhodes
- Location: United States
- Year: 1982
- Builder: Hinckley Yachts
- Role: Racer
- Name: Hinckley 42 Competition

Boat
- Displacement: 21,500 lb (9,752 kg)
- Draft: 7.30 ft (2.23 m)

Hull
- Type: monohull
- Construction: fiberglass
- LOA: 42.00 ft (12.80 m)
- LWL: 32.00 ft (9.75 m)
- Beam: 12.20 ft (3.72 m)
- Engine: inboard engine

Hull appendages
- Keel: fin keel
- Rudder: internally-mounted spade-type rudder

Rig
- Rig type: Bermuda rig
- I foretriangle height: 57.80 ft (17.62 m)
- J foretriangle base: 17.80 ft (5.43 m)
- P mainsail luff: 50.80 ft (15.48 m)
- E mainsail foot: 16.00 ft (4.88 m)

Sails
- Sailplan: masthead sloop
- Mainsail area: 406.40 sq ft (37.756 m^{2})
- Jib/genoa area: 514.42 sq ft (47.791 m^{2})
- Total sail area: 920.82 sq ft (85.547 m^{2})

The Hinckley 42 Competition is an American sailboat that was designed by McCurdy & Rhodes as a racer and first built in 1982.

The Hinckley 42 Competition is a development of the Sou'wester 42/43, also a McCurdy & Rhodes design.

== Production ==
The design was built by Hinckley Yachts in Southwest Harbor, Maine, United States, starting in 1982, but it is now out of production.

== Design ==
The Hinckley 42 Competition is a racing keelboat, built predominantly of fiberglass. It has a masthead sloop rig, an internally mounted spade-type rudder and a fixed fin keel. It displaces 21,500 lb (9,752 kg).

The boat has a draft of 7.30 ft (2.23 m) with the standard keel and a hull speed of 7.58 kn (14.04 km/h).

== See also ==
- List of sailing boat types
