= Intrepid 35 =

Sailboat class

Development
- Designer: McCurdy & Rhodes
- Location: United States
- Year: 1983
- Builders: Heritage Yacht Builders; Intrepid Yachts
- Role: Cruiser
- Name: Intrepid 35

Boat
- Displacement: 15,930 lb (7,226 kg)
- Draft: 5.60 ft (1.71 m)

Hull
- Type: monohull
- Construction: fibreglass
- LOA: 35.00 ft (10.67 m)
- LWL: 27.25 ft (8.31 m)
- Beam: 10.10 ft (3.08 m)
- Engine: inboard engine

Hull appendages
- Keel: fin keel
- Ballast: 6,250 lb (2,835 kg)
- Rudder: skeg-mounted rudder

Rig
- Rig type: Bermuda rig
- I foretriangle height: 42.80 ft (13.05 m)
- J foretriangle base: 14.30 ft (4.36 m)
- P mainsail luff: 37.30 ft (11.37 m)
- E mainsail foot: 13.50 ft (4.11 m)

Sails
- Sailplan: masthead sloop
- Mainsail area: 251.78 sq ft (23.391 m^{2})
- Jib/genoa area: 306.02 sq ft (28.430 m^{2})
- Total sail area: 557.80 sq ft (51.821 m^{2})

The Intrepid 35 is a Canadian sailboat that was designed by McCurdy & Rhodes as a cruiser and first built in 1983.

The Intrepid 35 is a development of the Heritage 35, with the hull built from the same molds.

== Production ==
The design was built by Heritage Yacht Builders in Oakdale, Ontario, starting in 1983 and later by Intrepid Yachts of Taunton, Massachusetts, but it is now out of production.

== Design ==
The Intrepid 35 is a recreational keelboat, built predominantly of fibreglass, with wood trim. It has a masthead sloop rig; a raked stem; a raised counter, reverse transom; a skeg-mounted rudder controlled by a wheel and a fixed fin keel. It displaces 15,930 lb (7,226 kg) and carries 6,250 lb (2,835 kg) of ballast.

The boat has a draft of 5.60 ft (1.71 m) with the standard keel and is fitted with an inboard engine for docking and manoeuvring.

The design has sleeping accommodation for five people, with a double "V"-berth in the bow cabin, two straight settees in the main cabin and an aft cabin with a quarter berth on the port side. The galley is located on the starboard side just forward of the companionway ladder. The galley is L-shaped and is equipped with a two-burner stove, an ice box and a sink. A navigation station is opposite the galley, on the port side. The head is located just aft of the bow cabin on the port side.

The design has a hull speed of 7.0 kn (13.0 km/h).

== See also ==
- List of sailing boat types
