= Hinckley 43 (Hood) =

Sailboat class

Development
- Designer: Ted Hood
- Location: United States
- Year: 1976
- Builder: Hinckley Yachts

Boat
- Displacement: 25,500 lb (11,567 kg)
- Draft: 11.50 ft (3.51 m) with centerboard down

Hull
- Type: monohull
- Construction: fiberglass
- LOA: 42.83 ft (13.05 m)
- LWL: 33.83 ft (10.31 m)
- Beam: 12.33 ft (3.76 m)
- Engine: Westerbeke W-40 FWC 40 hp (30 kW) diesel engine

Hull appendages
- Keel: fin keel with centerboard
- Ballast: 11,500 lb (5,216 kg)
- Rudder: skeg-mounted rudder

Rig
- Rig type: Bermuda rig
- I foretriangle height: 58.00 ft (17.68 m)
- J foretriangle base: 18.30 ft (5.58 m)
- P mainsail luff: 51.50 ft (15.70 m)
- E mainsail foot: 13.80 ft (4.21 m)

Sails
- Sailplan: masthead sloop
- Mainsail area: 355.35 sq ft (33.013 m^{2})
- Jib/genoa area: 530.70 sq ft (49.304 m^{2})
- Total sail area: 886.05 sq ft (82.317 m^{2})

The Hinckley 43 (Hood) is an American sailboat that was designed by Ted Hood and first built in 1976.

The design was originally marketed by the manufacturer as the Hinckley Hood 43 and later as just the Hinckley 43, but is now usually referred to as the Hinckley 43 (Hood) to differentiate it from the follow-on 1979 Hinckley 43 (Hood)-2 and the unrelated 1990 Hinckley 43 (McCurdy & Rhodes) design.

== Production ==
The design was built by Hinckley Yachts in the United States, from 1976 until 1981, but it is now out of production.

== Design ==
The Hinckley 43 (Hood) is a recreational keelboat, built predominantly of fiberglass, with wood trim. It has a masthead sloop rig; a raked stem; a raised counter, reverse transom, a skeg-mounted rudder controlled by a wheel and a fixed fin keel with a retractable centerboard. It displaces 25,500 lb (11,567 kg) and carries 11,500 lb (5,216 kg) of lead ballast.

The boat has a draft of 11.50 ft (3.51 m) with the centerboard extended and 4.33 ft (1.32 m) with it retracted, allowing operation in shallow water.

The boat is fitted with a Westerbeke W-40 FWC diesel engine of 40 hp (30 kW) for docking and maneuvering.

The design has sleeping accommodation for eight people, with a double "V"-berth in the bow cabin, two straight settee berths and two pilot berths in the main cabin and two aft cabins with single berths. The galley is located on both sides, just forward of the companionway ladder. The galley is equipped with a three-burner stove, an ice box and a double sink. A navigation station is located on the port side. The head is located just aft of the bow cabin on the port side.

The design has a hull speed of 7.79 kn (14.43 km/h).

== See also ==
- List of sailing boat types
