= Sou'wester 59 =

Sailboat class

Development
- Designer: McCurdy & Rhodes
- Location: United States
- Year: 1982
- Builder: Hinckley Yachts
- Role: Cruiser

Boat
- Displacement: 69,000 lb (31,298 kg)
- Draft: 12.50 ft (3.81 m) with centerboard down

Hull
- Type: Monohull
- Construction: Fiberglass
- LOA: 59.25 ft (18.06 m)
- LWL: 44.17 ft (13.46 m)
- Beam: 15.50 ft (4.72 m)
- Engine: Perkins Engines 135 hp (101 kW) diesel engine

Hull appendages
- Keel: Fin keel with centerboard
- Ballast: 23,500 lb (10,659 kg)
- Rudder: Skeg-mounted rudder

Rig
- Rig type: Bermuda rig
- I foretriangle height: 67.00 ft (20.42 m)
- J foretriangle base: 23.00 ft (7.01 m)
- P mainsail luff: 59.00 ft (17.98 m)
- E mainsail foot: 23.50 ft (7.16 m)

Sails
- Sailplan: Masthead sloop
- Mainsail area: 693.25 sq ft (64.405 m^{2})
- Jib/genoa area: 770.50 sq ft (71.582 m^{2})
- Total sail area: 1,463.75 sq ft (135.987 m^{2})

The Sou'wester 59 is an American sailboat that was designed by McCurdy & Rhodes as a cruiser and first built in 1982.

== Production ==
The design was built by Hinckley Yachts in the United States, starting in 1982, but it is now out of production.

== Design ==
The Sou'wester 59 is a recreational keelboat, built predominantly of fiberglass, with wood trim. It has a masthead sloop rig or optional ketch rig; a center cockpit; a raked stem; a raised counter, angled transom; a skeg-mounted rudder controlled by a wheel and a fixed fin keel with a retractable centerboard. It displaces 69,000 lb (31,298 kg) and carries 23,250 lb (10,546 kg) of lead ballast.

The boat has a draft of 12.50 ft (3.81 m) with the centerboard extended and 6.50 ft (1.98 m) with it retracted, allowing operation in shallow water.

The boat is fitted with a British Perkins Engines diesel engine of 135 hp (101 kW) for docking and maneuvering. The fuel tank holds 250 U.S. gallons (950 L; 210 imp gal) and the fresh water tank has a capacity of 380 U.S. gallons (1,400 L; 320 imp gal).

The design has sleeping accommodation for six people, with two single cabins in the bow and two aft cabins, both with double berths. The galley is located on the port side at the forward companionway ladder. The galley is U-shaped and is equipped with a stove, an ice box and a double sink. A navigation station is opposite the galley, on the starboard side. There are two heads, one in the forepeak and one on the port side in the aft cabin.

The design has a hull speed of 8.9 kn (16.5 km/h).

== See also ==
- List of sailing boat types
