= Seafarer 36C =

Sailboat class

Development
- Designer: Philip Rhodes
- Location: United States
- Year: 1968
- Builder: Seafarer Yachts
- Role: Cruiser

Boat
- Displacement: 16,350 lb (7,416 kg)
- Draft: 4.50 ft (1.37 m)

Hull
- Type: monohull
- Construction: fiberglass
- LOA: 36.33 ft (11.07 m)
- LWL: 26.25 ft (8.00 m)
- Beam: 10.50 ft (3.20 m)
- Engine: Universal 70 hp (52 kW) diesel engine

Hull appendages
- Keel: modified long keel
- Ballast: 5,500 lb (2,495 kg)
- Rudder: keel-mounted rudder

Rig
- Rig type: Masthead ketch
- I foretriangle height: 36.83 ft (11.23 m)
- J foretriangle base: 13.66 ft (4.16 m)
- P mainsail luff: 30.60 ft (9.33 m)
- E mainsail foot: 13.00 ft (3.96 m)

Sails
- Sailplan: ketch
- Mainsail area: 198.90 sq ft (18.478 m^{2})
- Jib/genoa area: 251.55 sq ft (23.370 m^{2})
- Total sail area: 450.45 sq ft (41.848 m^{2})

The Seafarer 36C is an American sailboat that was designed by Philip Rhodes as a cruiser and first built in 1968. The boat was built with a ketch rig or an optional sloop rig, without the mizzen mast, but with a taller main mast. The design was based on Rhodes Design #702.

== Production ==
The design was built by Seafarer Yachts in the United States, starting in 1968, but it is now out of production.

== Design ==
The Seafarer 36C is a recreational keelboat, built predominantly of fiberglass, with wood trim. It has a ketch or optional masthead sloop rig; a spooned, raked stem; a raised counter, angled transom; a keel-mounted rudder controlled by a wheel and a fixed, modified long keel, with a cutaway forefoot. It displaces 16,350 lb (7,416 kg) and carries 5,500 lb (2,495 kg) of ballast.

The boat has a draft of 4.50 ft (1.37 m) with the standard long keel.

The boat is fitted with a Universal 70 hp (52 kW) diesel engine for docking and maneuvering. The fuel tank holds 35 U.S. gallons (130 L; 29 imp gal) and the fresh water tank has a capacity of 75 U.S. gallons (280 L; 62 imp gal).

The design has two accommodations plans. Plan "A" has sleeping space for six people, with a double "V"-berth in the bow cabin, a starboard dinette table that converts to a double berth and an aft cabin in the deckhouse with a single berth on each side. The galley is located on the port side of the main cabin. The galley is located in the main cabin, is U-shaped and is equipped with a three-burner stove, ice box and a sink. The head is located just aft of the bow cabin on the port side and includes a shower.

Plan "B" also has sleeping accommodation for six people, with a double "V"-berth in the bow cabin, a starboard dinette table that converts to a double berth in the main cabin, along with a main cabin single berth on the port side and an aft cabin in the deckhouse with a single berth also on the port side. The galley is located in the deckhouse, just forward of the companionway ladder. The galley is straight and is equipped with a three-burner stove, an icebox and a sink. The head is located just aft of the bow cabin on the port side and includes a shower.

The design has a hull speed of 6.87 kn (12.72 km/h).

== See also ==
- List of sailing boat types
