= Rhodes 27 =

Sailboat built between 1938 and 1950

The Rhodes 27 is a sailboat designed by Philip Rhodes and manufactured by different boat builders in USA and Canada in the period 1938–1950. Approximately 40 boats were eventually built. Many of these wooden boats have been partially or fully restored.

The Rhodes 27 is 39 feet 2 inches long, 27 feet on the waterline with a narrow 9’8” beam. All were designed as sloops, and could sleep four, with provision for up to two additional pipe berths in the main cabin.

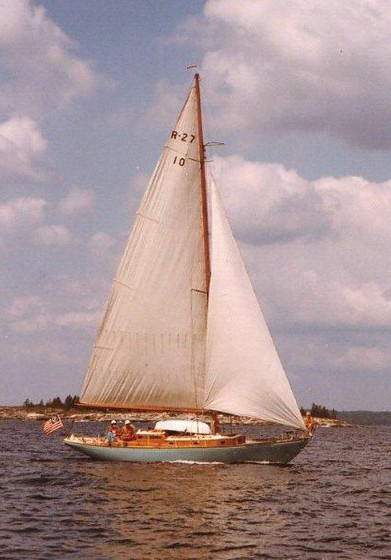
Rhodes 27 number 10, Jackstraw. Cruising off the Maine coast in 1975.
