= Sou'wester 42/43 =

Sailboat class

Development
- Designer: McCurdy & Rhodes
- Location: United States
- Year: 1982
- Builder: Hinckley Yachts
- Role: Cruiser

Boat
- Displacement: 24,000 lb (10,886 kg)
- Draft: 7.00 ft (2.13 m)

Hull
- Type: monohull
- Construction: fiberglass
- LOA: 42.75 ft (13.03 m)
- LWL: 31.25 ft (9.53 m)
- Beam: 12.50 ft (3.81 m)
- Engine: Westerbeke 52 hp (39 kW) diesel engine

Hull appendages
- Keel: fin keel
- Ballast: 8,500 lb (3,856 kg)
- Rudder: skeg-mounted rudder

Rig
- Rig type: Bermuda rig
- I foretriangle height: 54.25 ft (16.54 m)
- J foretriangle base: 17.50 ft (5.33 m)
- P mainsail luff: 47.25 ft (14.40 m)
- E mainsail foot: 14.50 ft (4.42 m)

Sails
- Sailplan: masthead sloop
- Mainsail area: 342.56 sq ft (31.825 m^{2})
- Jib/genoa area: 474.69 sq ft (44.100 m^{2})
- Total sail area: 817.25 sq ft (75.925 m^{2})

The Sou'wester 42/43 is an American sailboat that was designed by McCurdy & Rhodes as a cruiser and first built in 1982.

The design was developed into the racing Hinckley 42 Competition and the Hinckley 43 (McCurdy & Rhodes).

== Production ==
The design was built by Hinckley Yachts in the United States from 1982 until 2006, but it is now out of production.

== Design ==
The Sou'wester 42/43 is a recreational keelboat, built predominantly of fiberglass, with wood trim. It has a masthead sloop rig, a raked stem, a raised counter reverse transom, a skeg-mounted rudder controlled by a wheel and a fixed fin keel or optional shoal draft keel. It displaces 24,000 lb (10,886 kg) and carries 8,500 lb (3,856 kg) of lead ballast.

The design was built on a custom basis and details varied greatly, including the keel and rudder configurations and the transom design. The designation indicates that some were built as 42s and some as 43s, mostly depending on transom configuration and resulting length overall. An improved Mark II version was introduced in 1995.

The boat has a draft of 7.00 ft (2.13 m) with the standard keel and 5.00 ft (1.52 m) with the optional shoal draft keel.

The boat is fitted with a Westerbeke diesel engine of 52 hp (39 kW) for docking and maneuvering. The fuel tank holds 60 U.S. gallons (230 L; 50 imp gal) and the fresh water tank has a capacity of 155 U.S. gallons (590 L; 129 imp gal).

The design has sleeping accommodation for seven people, with a double "V"-berth in the bow cabin, a main cabin U-shaped settee with a drop-down dinette table, that forms a double berth, an additional pilot berth on the starboard side of the main cabin and an aft cabin with a double berth. The galley is located on the port side just forward of the companionway ladder. The galley is U-shaped and is equipped with a three-burner stove, an ice box and a double sink. A navigation station is opposite the galley, on the starboard side. The head is located just aft of the bow cabin on the port side and includes a shower.

The design has a hull speed of 7.49 kn (13.87 km/h).

== See also ==
- List of sailing boat types
