= Rhodes 22 =

Sailboat class

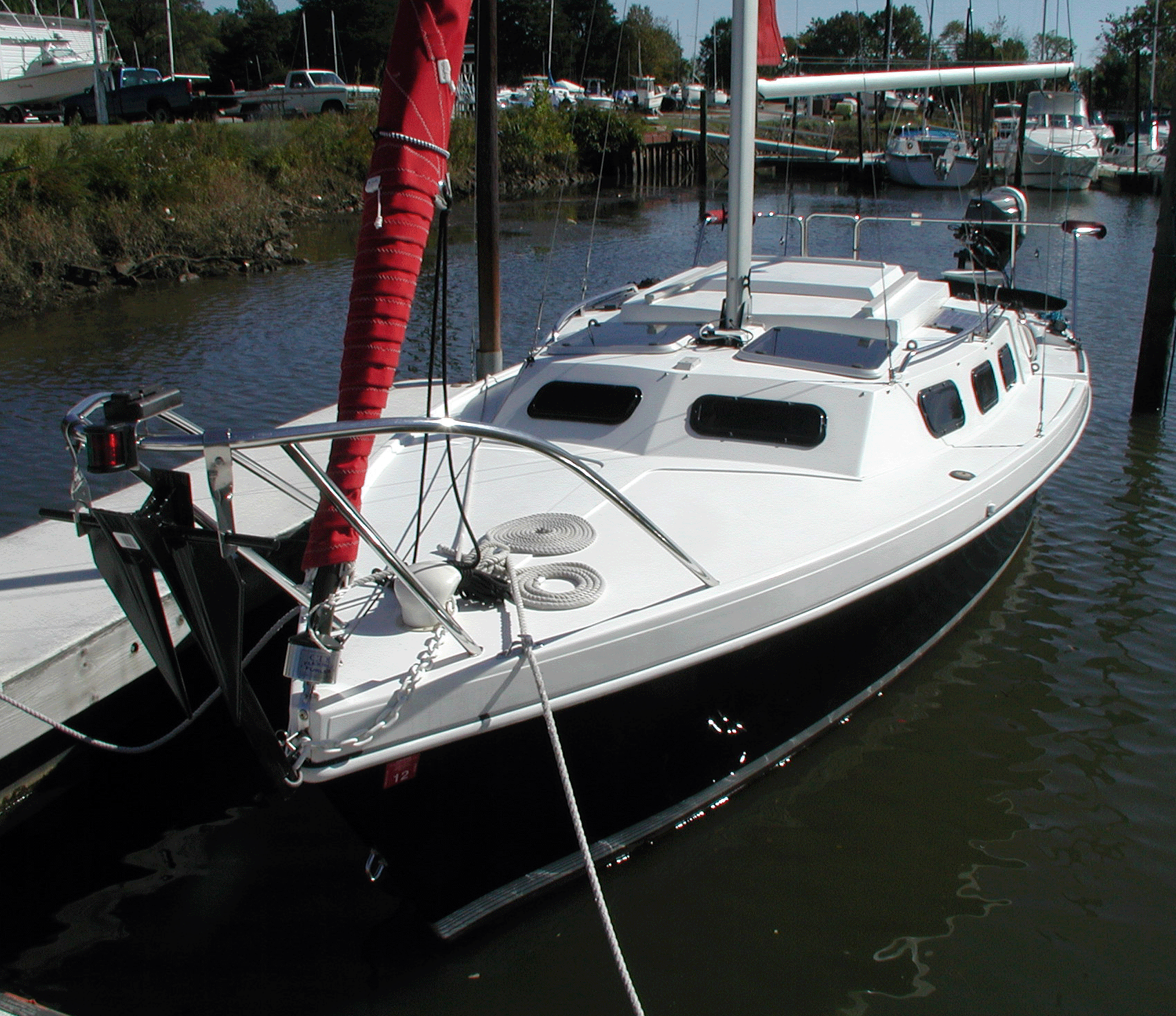

Development
- Designer: Philip Rhodes
- Location: United States
- Year: 1968
- No. built: 1,000
- Builders: General Boats; C&C Yachts; Ray Greene & Co; Siddons & Sindle; Lofland Sail-craft
- Role: Cruiser
- Name: Rhodes 22

Boat
- Displacement: 2,000 lb (907 kg)
- Draft: 4.00 ft (1.22 m) with centerboard down

Hull
- Type: monohull
- Construction: fiberglass
- LOA: 22.00 ft (6.71 m)
- LWL: 20.00 ft (6.10 m)
- Beam: 8.00 ft (2.44 m)
- Engine: outboard motor

Hull appendages
- Keel: stub keel and centerboard
- Ballast: 600 lb (272 kg)
- Rudder: transom-mounted rudder

Rig
- Rig type: Bermuda rig
- I foretriangle height: 25.50 ft (7.77 m)
- J foretriangle base: 8.80 ft (2.68 m)
- P mainsail luff: 21.30 ft (6.49 m)
- E mainsail foot: 8.50 ft (2.59 m)

Sails
- Sailplan: masthead sloop
- Mainsail area: 90.53 sq ft (8.411 m^{2})
- Jib/genoa area: 112.20 sq ft (10.424 m^{2})
- Total sail area: 202.73 sq ft (18.834 m^{2})

Racing
- PHRF: 334

The Rhodes 22, also referred to as the Rhodes 22 Continental, is an American trailerable sailboat that was designed by Philip Rhodes as a cruiser and first built in 1968.

== Production ==
The boat was designed by Rhodes at the request of General Boats owner Stan Spitzer and first built by that company. It was later built in Canada by C&C Yachts and in the United States by Ray Greene & Co, Siddons & Sindle and Lofland Sail-craft, with 1,000 boats completed, but it is now out of production.

== Design ==
The Rhodes 22 is a recreational keelboat, built predominantly of fiberglass. It has a masthead sloop rig, a raked stem, a slightly reverse transom, a transom-hung rudder controlled by a tiller and a fixed stub keel with a retractable centerboard. The hull has a slight reverse sheer. It displaces 2,000 lb (907 kg) and carries 600 lb (272 kg) of ballast.

The boat includes a mast-furling mainsail without sail battens and roller furling jib. The cabin has a "pop-top" to increase headroom, two opening ports forward of the pop-top and fixed ports on the front of the coach house.

The boat has a draft of 4.00 ft (1.22 m) with the centerboard extended and 1.67 ft (0.51 m) with it retracted, allowing operation in shallow water or ground transportation on a trailer.

The boat is normally fitted with a small 3 to 6 hp (2 to 4 kW) outboard motor for docking and maneuvering.

The design has sleeping accommodation for four people, with a double "V"-berth in the bow cabin and drop-down dinette table in the main cabin. The galley is located on the port side just forward of the companionway ladder. The galley is straight in layout and is equipped with a single-burner stove and a sink. The enclosed head is located just aft of the bow cabin on the port side. Cabin headroom is 54 in (137 cm).

The design has a PHRF racing average handicap of 334 and a hull speed of 6.0 kn (11.1 km/h).

== Operational history ==
In a 1997 review in Practical Sailor, Darrell Nicholson concluded, "it's nice to see a boat that does what it's intended to do as well as the Rhodes 22 does. It's a cruiser, and packs a lot of cruising capability into a small trailerable boat. You can daysail it, obviously, but it's really on the pricey side if a daysailer is all you want. And you can squeeze some more adults aboard for cruising, but at the expense of comfort, privacy or both. As a cruiser for two, it's hard to beat without going up considerably in size and price. The reports we've received from readers are almost universally enthusiastic."

In a 2010 review Steve Henkel wrote, "Philip Rhodes, who designed many gorgeous if sometimes slow sailboats, was asked in 1968 by General Boats to design a vessel for its owner, Stan Spitzer, to incorporate the builder's ideas. Two years later, after the company’s previous craft, the flare-sided 17-foot Picnic ... designed by Nils Lucander was discontinued, the 'Rhodes Continental 22' ... went into production. How much of the boat was actually designed by Rhodes is a question, since her style is nothing like Rhodes's other very recognizable boats, and Spitzer says he no longer has any drawings from Rhodes. The Picnic's reverse sheer hull, flared from stem to stern, is repeated in this boat ... Best features: Compared to two of her three comp[etitor]s, the Rhodes 22 has slightly more headroom (though to get standing headroom, the poptop must be raised). Worst features: Draft with board up is at the high end among comp[petitor]s, making launching relatively harder. Price new ... is very high for what is offered. Check out the competition before you buy."

== See also ==
- List of sailing boat types
