= Rhodes Bantam =

Sailboat launched in 1945

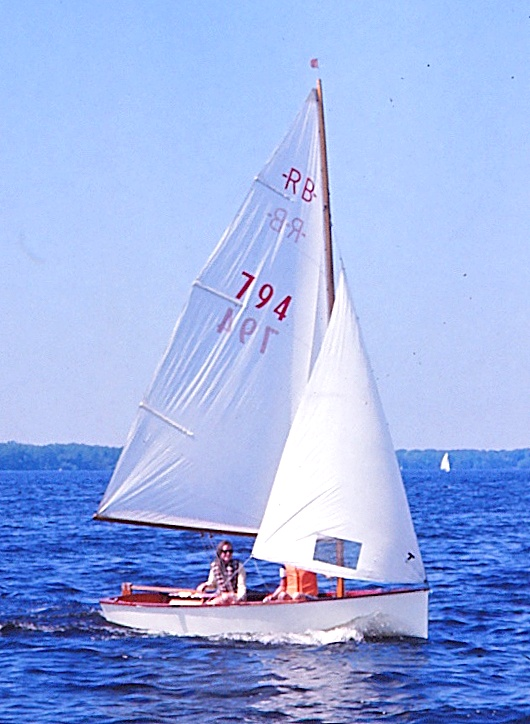
- -R-B-

Development
- Designer: Philip Rhodes
- Year: 1945
- Design: one-design
- Name: Rhodes Bantam

Boat
- Crew: 1-2
- Draft: 4 ft 2 in (1.27 m)
- Trapeze: hiking straps

Hull
- Type: Monohull
- Construction: Wood; Fiberglass
- Hull weight: 325 lb (147 kg)
- LOA: 14 ft 0 in (4.27 m)
- LWL: 13 ft 1 in (3.99 m)
- Beam: 5 ft 6 in (1.68 m)

Hull appendages
- Keel: centerboard

Rig
- Rig type: sloop

Sails
- Mainsail area: 77.25 sq ft (7.177 m^{2})
- Jib/genoa area: 46.5 sq ft (4.32 m^{2})
- Spinnaker area: 155 sq ft (14.4 m^{2})

Racing
- D-PN: 97.4

The Rhodes Bantam is a strict one-design class sailboat designed by Philip Rhodes in 1945. The first boat was launched in 1945 in Skaneateles. More than 1500 have been built. It can be used for day sailing and will comfortably hold 2 adults and 2 children. It is also used for racing, usually with a crew of two. Originally it was built of wood and could be purchased either complete, or as a kit. In the 1960s, when fiberglass gained popularity as a hull material, it became possible to buy either a fiberglass hull kit or a finished boat. The Bantam may be classified as a centreboard dinghy. In addition to the mainsail, it typically has a genoa jib and spinnaker. It uses a centerboard for stability. It has a hard chine line which permits planing when on a beam reach or when sailing downwind with spinnaker. The class was very popular in the 1950s and 1960s. Active fleets existed in the Finger Lakes Region (e.g. Cuyuga Lake, Skaneateles Lake), Pennsylvania, Ohio, the Midwest and even Florida. The Rhodes Bantam Class Association sponsored a yearly regatta which rotated through the home ports of various fleets.
