= Hinckley 43 (McCurdy & Rhodes) =

Sailboat class

Development
- Designer: McCurdy & Rhodes
- Location: United States
- Year: 1990
- Builder: Hinckley Yachts
- Role: Cruiser
- Name: Hinckley 43 (McCurdy & Rhodes)

Boat
- Displacement: 24,000 lb (10,886 kg)
- Draft: 9.10 ft (2.77 m) with centerboard down

Hull
- Type: monohull
- Construction: fiberglass
- LOA: 43.85 ft (13.37 m)
- LWL: 31.25 ft (9.53 m)
- Beam: 12.50 ft (3.81 m)
- Engine: Westerbeke 46 hp (34 kW) diesel engine

Hull appendages
- Keel: fin keel with centerboard
- Ballast: 8,500 lb (3,856 kg)
- Rudder: internally-mounted spade-type rudder

Rig
- Rig type: Bermuda rig

Sails
- Sailplan: masthead sloop
- Total sail area: 818.00 sq ft (75.995 m^{2})

The Hinckley 43 (McCurdy & Rhodes) is an American sailboat that was designed by McCurdy & Rhodes as a cruiser and first built in 1990.

The design is a development of the 1982 McCurdy & Rhodes designed Sou'wester 42/43.

The design was originally marketed by the manufacturer as the Hinckley 43, but is now usually referred to as the Hinckley 43 (McCurdy & Rhodes) to differentiate it from the unrelated 1976 Hinckley 43 (Hood) and the 1979 Hinckley 43 (Hood)-2 designs.

== Production ==
The design was built by Hinckley Yachts in the United States, starting in 1990, but it is now out of production.

== Design ==
The Hinckley 43 (McCurdy & Rhodes) is a recreational keelboat, built predominantly of fiberglass, with wood trim. It has a masthead sloop rig; a raked stem; a raised counter, reverse transom; an internally mounted spade-type rudder controlled by a wheel and a fixed fin keel with a retractable centerboard. It displaces 24,000 lb (10,886 kg) and carries 8,500 lb (3,856 kg) of lead ballast.

The boat has a draft of 9.10 ft (2.77 m) with the centerboard extended and 5.00 ft (1.52 m) with it retracted, allowing operation in shallow water.

The boat is fitted with a Westerbeke diesel engine of 46 hp (34 kW) for docking and maneuvering. The fuel tank holds 115 U.S. gallons (440 L; 96 imp gal) and the fresh water tank has a capacity of 148 U.S. gallons (560 L; 123 imp gal).

The design has sleeping accommodation for six people, with a double "V"-berth in the bow cabin, a U-shaped settee around a drop-down table and a straight settee berth in the main cabin and an aft cabin with a single berth on the starboard side. The galley is located on the port side just forward of the companionway ladder. The galley is U-shaped and is equipped with a three-burner stove, an ice box and a double sink. A navigation station is opposite the galley, on the starboard side. The head is located just aft of the bow cabin on the starboard side.

The design has a hull speed of 7.49 kn (13.87 km/h).

== See also ==
- List of sailing boat types
