= Rhodes 19 =

One-design sailing dinghy

Development
- Designer: Philip Rhodes
- Location: United States
- Year: 1958
- No. built: 3,200
- Builders: O'Day Corp; Stuart Marine
- Role: One-design racer
- Name: Rhodes 19

Boat
- Displacement: 1,325 lb (601 kg)
- Draft: 3.25 ft (0.99 m)

Hull
- Type: monohull
- Construction: fiberglass
- LOA: 19.16 ft (5.84 m)
- LWL: 17.75 ft (5.41 m)
- Beam: 7.00 ft (2.13 m)

Hull appendages
- Keel: fin keel
- Ballast: 428 lb (194 kg)
- Rudder: transom-mounted rudder

Rig
- Rig type: Bermuda rig
- I foretriangle height: 15.00 ft (4.57 m)
- J foretriangle base: 6.50 ft (1.98 m)
- P mainsail luff: 24.00 ft (7.32 m)
- E mainsail foot: 9.88 ft (3.01 m)

Sails
- Sailplan: fractional rigged sloop
- Mainsail area: 118.56 sq ft (11.015 m^{2})
- Jib/genoa area: 48.75 sq ft (4.529 m^{2})
- Total sail area: 167.31 sq ft (15.544 m^{2})

Racing
- PHRF: 261

The Rhodes 19 is a sailing dinghy first built in 1958 by O'Day Corp and later by Stuart Marine in the United States. It remains in production, with 3,200 boats completed.

It is a one-design racer that is actively raced."

== Design ==
It was designed by Philip Rhodes and traces its lineage to the 1945 Hurricane 19 sailboat design. The Hurricane 19 was constructed of moulded plywood, had an open cockpit and was initially built by the Allied Aviation Corporation. Another boat builder, Palmer Scott, purchased some incomplete Hurricane hulls and modified them with a foredeck, a cuddy cabin and a fixed keel, marketing the resultant boat as the Smyrna. Marscot Plastics used one of the wooden Smyrnas as a plug to build a mold from and created a fiberglass version, which became the Rhodes 19.

The Rhodes 19 shares the same hull design as the 1962 Mariner 19.

The hull is built predominantly of fiberglass, with wood trim. The hull has a raked stem, a plumb transom, a transom-hung rudder controlled by a tiller and a fixed fin keel or centerboard. It has foam flotation.

The design has sleeping accommodation for two people in the cuddy cabin and includes a built-in icebox. It has cockpit space for six to eight people.

It is equipped with a stern-mounted mainsheet traveler, adjustable jib leads. It has a fractional sloop rig with aluminum spars, including an optional tapered mast.

Factory options included a boom tent, boom vang, Cunningham, cockpit bailers, whisker pole and a spinnaker of 326 sq ft (30.3 m^{2}).

== Variants ==
Rhodes 19
This keelboat model displaces 1,325 lb (601 kg) and carries 428 lb (194 kg) of iron ballast. The boat has a draft of 3.25 ft (0.99 m) with the standard keel fitted. The boat has a Portsmouth Yardstick DP-N racing average handicap of 99.0. The fixed keel Rhodes 19 is the only variant used for class racing.
Rhodes 19 CB
This centerboard sailing dinghy model displaces 1,030 lb (467 kg) and carries no ballast. The rudder is a "kick-up" design. The boat has a draft of 4.92 ft (1.50 m) with the centerboard down and 10 in (25 cm) with it retracted. The boat has a Portsmouth DP-N racing average handicap of 97.4.
