= Hinckley 43 (Hood)-2 =

Sailboat class

Development
- Designer: Ted Hood
- Location: United States
- Year: 1979
- Builder: Hinckley Yachts
- Name: Hinckley 43 (Hood)-2

Boat
- Displacement: 25,500 lb (11,567 kg)
- Draft: 11.50 ft (3.51 m) with centerboard down

Hull
- Type: monohull
- Construction: fiberglass
- LOA: 42.83 ft (13.05 m)
- LWL: 33.83 ft (10.31 m)
- Beam: 12.33 ft (3.76 m)
- Engine: inboard engine

Hull appendages
- Keel: fin keel with centerboard

Rig
- Rig type: Bermuda rig
- I foretriangle height: 54.00 ft (16.46 m)
- J foretriangle base: 18.30 ft (5.58 m)
- P mainsail luff: 47.50 ft (14.48 m)
- E mainsail foot: 13.80 ft (4.21 m)

Sails
- Sailplan: masthead sloop
- Mainsail area: 320.63 sq ft (29.788 m^{2})
- Jib/genoa area: 494.10 sq ft (45.903 m^{2})
- Total sail area: 814.73 sq ft (75.691 m^{2})

The Hinckley 43 (Hood) is an American sailboat that was designed by Ted Hood and first built in 1979.

The design was originally marketed by the manufacturer as the Hinckley 43, but is now usually referred to as the Hinckley 43 (Hood)-2 to differentiate it from the earlier 1976 Hinckley 43 (Hood) and the unrelated 1990 Hinckley 43 (McCurdy & Rhodes) design.

== Production ==
The design was built by Hinckley Yachts in the United States, from 1979, but it is now out of production.

== Design ==
The Hinckley 43 (Hood) is a recreational keelboat, built predominantly of fiberglass, with wood trim. It has a masthead sloop rig and a fixed fin keel with a retractable centerboard. It displaces 25,500 lb (11,567 kg).

The boat has a draft of 11.50 ft (3.51 m) with the centerboard extended and 4.33 ft (1.32 m) with it retracted, allowing operation in shallow water. The boat is fitted with an inboard engine for docking and maneuvering.

The design has a hull speed of 7.79 kn (14.43 km/h).

== See also ==
- List of sailing boat types
