= Seafarer 24 =

1970s US recreational keelboat

Seafarer 24 K
Development
- Designer: McCurdy & Rhodes
- Location: United States
- Year: 1974
- Builder: Seafarer Yachts
- Role: Cruiser

Boat
- Displacement: 3,910 lb (1,774 kg)
- Draft: 3.75 ft (1.14 m)

Hull
- Type: monohull
- Construction: fiberglass
- LOA: 24.08 ft (7.34 m)
- LWL: 20.75 ft (6.32 m)
- Beam: 7.82 ft (2.38 m)
- Engine: outboard motor

Hull appendages
- Keel: fin keel
- Ballast: 1,400 lb (635 kg)
- Rudder: skeg-mounted rudder

Rig
- Rig type: Bermuda rig
- I foretriangle height: 28.50 ft (8.69 m)
- J foretriangle base: 10.30 ft (3.14 m)
- P mainsail luff: 24.00 ft (7.32 m)
- E mainsail foot: 9.30 ft (2.83 m)

Sails
- Sailplan: masthead sloop
- Mainsail area: 111.60 sq ft (10.368 m^{2})
- Jib/genoa area: 146.78 sq ft (13.636 m^{2})
- Total sail area: 258.38 sq ft (24.004 m^{2})

Racing
- PHRF: 240

The Seafarer 24 is a recreational keelboat built by Seafarer Yachts in Huntington, New York, in the United States starting in 1974, but it is now out of production.

Boats were supplied complete and ready-to-sail, or as kits for amateur completion.

== Design ==
Designed by McCurdy & Rhodes, the Seafarer 24 is built predominantly of fiberglass. It has a masthead sloop rig, a raked stem and a reverse transom. There were versions with a fixed keel and a retractable centerboard.

There were two different decks available, "Standard" and "Futura", plus four different cabin layouts. The Standard deck has 57 in (145 cm) of cabin headroom, while the Futura has 70 in (178 cm) in the aft portion.

The design has sleeping accommodation for five people. One typical layout has a double "V"-berth in the bow cabin, a straight settee berth to starboard in the main cabin and a drop-down dinette table to port that converts to a double berth. The galley is located on the starboard side amidships and is equipped with a two-burner stove and a sink. A navigation station is opposite the galley, on the starboard side. The enclosed head is located just aft of the bow cabin on the port side. The fresh water tank has a capacity of 20 U.S. gallons (76 L; 17 imp gal).

The boat is normally fitted with a small 3 to 6 hp (2 to 4 kW) outboard motor for docking and maneuvering.

The design has a hull speed of 6.1 kn (11.3 km/h).

In a 2010 review Steve Henkel wrote, "the centerboard version has virtually the same ballast and displacement as the fixed keel design, but with ballast weight centered higher up: the board has only 207 lbs. of lead, which makes her significantly more tender than the keel boat in heavy air. A Seafarer brochure mentions that this version 'has positive self-righting ability regardless of centerboard position.' Maybe so, but since 85 percent of the ballast is only a foot below the [waterline], righting moment is minimal. We'd not venture far out in heavy air."

== Variants ==
Seafarer 24 K
This keel-equipped model has a skeg-mounted rudder controlled by a tiller and a fixed fin keel. It displaces 3,910 lb (1,774 kg) and carries 1,400 lb (635 kg) of ballast. The boat has a draft of 3.75 ft (1.14 m) with the standard keel. The boat has a PHRF racing average handicap of 240.
Seafarer 24 C
Marketed as the "Seafarer Sail 'n Trail 24", this centerboard model has a kick-up, transom-hung rudder controlled by a tiller. It displaces 3,920 lb (1,778 kg) and carries 1,407 lb (638 kg) of ballast of which 207 lb (94 kg) of lead is in the centerboard. The boat has a draft of 3.75 ft (1.14 m) with the centerboard extended and 1.75 ft (0.53 m), with it retracted, allowing operation in shallow water, beaching or ground transportation on a trailer. The boat has a PHRF racing average handicap of 243.
