= Seafarer 29 =

Sailboat class

Development
- Designer: McCurdy & Rhodes
- Location: United States
- Year: 1972
- Builder: Seafarer Yachts
- Role: Racer-Cruiser
- Name: Seafarer 29

Boat
- Displacement: 6,610 lb (2,998 kg)
- Draft: 4.50 ft (1.37 m)

Hull
- Type: monohull
- Construction: fiberglass
- LOA: 28.70 ft (8.75 m)
- LWL: 21.25 ft (6.48 m)
- Beam: 9.00 ft (2.74 m)

Hull appendages
- Keel: fin keel
- Ballast: 2,560 lb (1,161 kg)
- Rudder: skeg-mounted/internally-mounted spade-type/transom-mounted rudder

Rig
- Rig type: Bermuda rig
- I foretriangle height: 33.50 ft (10.21 m)
- J foretriangle base: 11.50 ft (3.51 m)
- P mainsail luff: 28.50 ft (8.69 m)
- E mainsail foot: 11.50 ft (3.51 m)

Sails
- Sailplan: masthead sloop
- Mainsail area: 163.88 sq ft (15.225 m^{2})
- Jib/genoa area: 192.63 sq ft (17.896 m^{2})
- Total sail area: 356.42 sq ft (33.113 m^{2})

The Seafarer 29 is an American sailboat that was designed by McCurdy & Rhodes as an International Offshore Rule Half Ton class racer-cruiser and first built in 1972.

== Production ==
The design was built by Seafarer Yachts in the United States, starting in 1972, but it is now out of production.

== Design ==
The Seafarer 29 is a recreational keelboat, built predominantly of solid laminate fiberglass, with wood trim. It was built with two different deck plans: "Standard" and "Futura". It has a masthead sloop rig; a spooned, raked stem; a raised counter, reverse transom, a skeg-mounted rudder controlled by a wheel and a fixed fin keel or optional centerboard. The fixed keel version displaces 6,610 lb (2,998 kg) and carries 2,560 lb (1,161 kg) of ballast, while the centerboard-equipped version displaces 6,665 lb (3,023 kg) and carries 2,490 lb (1,129 kg) of ballast.

The keel-equipped version of the boat has a draft of 4.50 ft (1.37 m), while the centerboard-equipped version has a draft of 4.50 ft (1.37 m) with the centerboard extended and 2.50 ft (0.76 m) with it retracted, allowing operation in shallow water.

The design has sleeping accommodation for five people, with a double "V"-berth in the bow cabin, an U-shaped settee in the main cabin around a swing table that converts to a double berth and an aft quarter berth on the starboard side. The galley is located on the starboard side just aft of the bow cabin. The galley is equipped with a two-burner stove and a sink. The head is located just aft of the bow cabin on the port side.

The Half Ton class version was a specially configured model.

The design has a hull speed of 6.18 kn (11.45 km/h).

== Operational history ==
The boat is supported by an active class club that organizes racing events, the Half Ton Class.

== See also ==
- List of sailing boat types
