= Seafarer 22 =

1970s US recreational keelboat

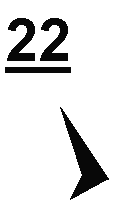

Development
- Designer: McCurdy & Rhodes
- Location: United States
- Year: 1976
- Builder: Seafarer Yachts
- Role: Cruiser

Boat
- Displacement: 2,300 lb (1,043 kg)
- Draft: 2.83 ft (0.86 m)

Hull
- Type: monohull
- Construction: fiberglass with balsa-cored deck
- LOA: 21.67 ft (6.61 m)
- LWL: 18.33 ft (5.59 m)
- Beam: 7.42 ft (2.26 m)
- Engine: outboard motor

Hull appendages
- Keel: fin keel
- Ballast: 780 lb (354 kg)
- Rudder: skeg-mounted rudder

Rig
- Rig type: Bermuda rig
- I foretriangle height: 26.00 ft (7.92 m)
- J foretriangle base: 9.25 ft (2.82 m)
- P mainsail luff: 21.75 ft (6.63 m)
- E mainsail foot: 8.00 ft (2.44 m)

Sails
- Sailplan: masthead sloop
- Mainsail area: 87.00 sq ft (8.083 m^{2})
- Jib/genoa area: 120.25 sq ft (11.172 m^{2})
- Total sail area: 207.25 sq ft (19.254 m^{2})

Racing
- PHRF: 270

The Seafarer 22 is a recreational keelboat built by Seafarer Yachts in Huntington, New York in the United States, starting in 1976, but it is now out of production.

== Design ==
Designed by McCurdy & Rhodes, the Seafarer 22 is built predominantly of fiberglass with a balsa-cored deck. It has a masthead sloop rig, a raked stem, a slightly reverse transom, a skeg-mounted rudder controlled by a tiller and a fixed fin or optional shoal draft keel. It displaces 2,300 lb (1,043 kg) and carries 780 lb (354 kg) of lead ballast.

The boat has a draft of 2.83 ft (0.86 m) with the standard keel and 2.08 ft (0.63 m) with the optional shoal draft keel. The shoal draft keel model also had a transom-mounted, vertically lifting rudder.

There were also two deck designs available for the same hull, the earlier production "Futura" deck, which was more streamlined and had only one port per side or the later "Standard" deck with two cabin ports per side or.

The boat is normally fitted with a small 3 to 6 hp (2 to 4 kW) outboard motor for docking and maneuvering.

The design has sleeping accommodation for four people, with a double "V"-berth in the bow cabin and two straight settee berths in the main cabin around a folding table. The galley is located on the port side just aft of the bow cabin. The galley is equipped with a sink. The head is located in the bow cabin under the "V"-berth. Cabin headroom is 57 in (145 cm) and the fresh water tank has a capacity of 12 U.S. gallons (45 L; 10.0 imp gal).

The design has a PHRF racing average handicap of 270 and a hull speed of 5.7 kn (10.6 km/h).

== Reception ==
In a 2010 review Steve Henkel wrote, "the first of a long line of McCurdy & Rhodes designs for Seafarer Fiberglass Yachts of Huntington, NY ... This model featured a streamlined forward deck and only one portlight on each side. Later versions of the '22' used a new deck molding, with extra ports that give more light below, and also offered a choice of two keels, either the 2' 10" so-called 'high performance' keel ... designed primarily for better stability and speed, or a 2' 1" keel for easier launching and retrieving from a trailer. Best features: The coaming on the early boats ... curled up over the cabin-top to ease attachment of a weather-tight dodger, a great convenience when cruising in rainy weather. Worst features: The shoal-keel version's performance will not satisfy most sailors, and the smaller, shallower rudder that is needed to match the shoal keel will not perform as well either. We recommend sticking with the 'high performance' version—which can't be expected to match her comp[etitor]s upwind pointing ability, since she's just not deep enough. The skeg-mounted rudder in both early and late versions has been known to develop problems at the gudgeons. In the early one-port-per-side boats, some owners have sawn holes for new ports to secure additional light below."
