= Woodpussy =

Type of sailboat

Development
- Designer: Philip Rhodes
- Year: 1945
- Name: Woodpussy

Boat
- Crew: 1–2

Hull
- Type: Monohull
- Construction: Wood; Fiberglass
- Hull weight: 430 lb (200 kg)
- LOA: 13 ft 6 in (4.11 m)
- Beam: 6 ft (1.8 m)

Rig
- Rig type: Catboat
- Mast height: 23 ft 5 in (7.14 m)

Sails
- Total sail area: 130 sq ft (12 m^{2})

The WoodPussy is a 13.5 ft (4.1 m) catboat designed by Philip Rhodes. The first boats were constructed in 1945 by Palmer Scott Boat Works. These boats were wood with wooden masts. The class switched to fiberglass hulls, dacron sails and aluminum masts in the early 1960s. It is estimated that 800–850 hulls were constructed by Palmer Scott, MarScott and O'Day. The Weeks Yacht Yard in New York is now building new fiberglass WoodPussys.

Today there are four fleets of WoodPussies: Monmouth Boat Club (MBC) and Shrewsbury Sailing and Yacht Club (SSYC), both in New Jersey; Crystal Lake Yacht Club, Frankfort, MI; and NorthEast WoodPussy Association, Long Island, NY. The WoodPussy is used for both daysailing and racing. The class, which is recognized by US Sailing as a one-design for racing, holds two major regattas each year: the Solo Bowl, which is limited to single-handed sailing; and the National Championship, which may be sailed either single-handed or with a crew.

Class National Championships Winners
Year	Sailor - Home Club
2002	Dan Vought - MBC
2003	Dave & Julia Watts - MBC
2004	Dave & Julia Watts - MBC
2005	Tony Keator - MBC
2006	John Garth - SSYC
2007	John Quinn - SSYC
2008	John Garth - SSYC
2009	Dan Vought - MBC
2010	Dan Vought - MBC
2011	John Garth - SSYC
2012	Talbott Ingram - SSYC
2013	Jeff Jacobi - SSYC
2014	Jeff Jacobi - SSYC
2015	Dan Vought - MBC
2016	Cole Barney - MBC
2017	Dan Vought - MBC
2018	Cole Barney - MBC
2019	Cole Barney - MBC
2020	John Garth - SSYC
2021	John Garth - SSYC

== Specifications Under Current Rules ==
- Number of crew 1–2
- LOA 13 ft 6 in (4.11 m)
- Beam 6 ft 0 in (1.83 m)
- Hull weight 430 lb (200 kg)
- Mast Height 23.5 ft (7.2 m)
- Sail Area 130 sq ft (12 m^{2})
