= Seafarer 37 =

1980s US recreational keelboat

Development
- Designer: McCurdy & Rhodes
- Location: United States
- Year: 1980
- Builder: Seafarer Yachts
- Role: Cruiser

Boat
- Displacement: 16,500 lb (7,484 kg)
- Draft: 6.25 ft (1.91 m)

Hull
- Type: monohull
- Construction: fiberglass
- LOA: 36.67 ft (11.18 m)
- LWL: 31.25 ft (9.53 m)
- Beam: 11.75 ft (3.58 m)
- Engine: inboard motor

Hull appendages
- Keel: fin keel
- Ballast: 6,675 lb (3,028 kg)
- Rudder: skeg-mounted rudder

Rig
- Rig type: Bermuda rig
- I foretriangle height: 46.50 ft (14.17 m)
- J foretriangle base: 15.00 ft (4.57 m)
- P mainsail luff: 41.00 ft (12.50 m)
- E mainsail foot: 13.00 ft (3.96 m)

Sails
- Sailplan: masthead sloop
- Mainsail area: 266.50 sq ft (24.759 m^{2})
- Jib/genoa area: 348.75 sq ft (32.400 m^{2})
- Total sail area: 615.25 sq ft (57.159 m^{2})

The Seafarer 37 is a recreational keelboat built by Seafarer Yachts in the United States, starting in 1980, but the company went out of business in 1985, The boat was the last design to enter production by Seafarer.

== Design ==
Designed by McCurdy & Rhodes, the Seafarer 37 is built predominantly of fiberglass, with wood trim. It has a masthead sloop rig, a raked stem, a slightly reverse transom, a skeg-mounted rudder controlled by a wheel and a fixed fin keel or optional shoal draft keel. It displaces 16,500 lb (7,484 kg) and carries 6,675 lb (3,028 kg) of lead ballast.

The boat has a draft of 6.25 ft (1.91 m) with the standard keel and 5.00 ft (1.52 m) with the optional shoal draft keel.

The boat is fitted with an inboard engine for docking and maneuvering. The fuel tank holds 30 U.S. gallons (110 L; 25 imp gal) and the fresh water tank has a capacity of 200 U.S. gallons (760 L; 170 imp gal). Cabin headroom is 6.42 in (16 cm).

For sailing downwind the design may be equipped with a symmetrical spinnaker.

The design has a hull speed of 7.49 kn (13.87 km/h).
