= Seafarer 30 =

Sailboat class

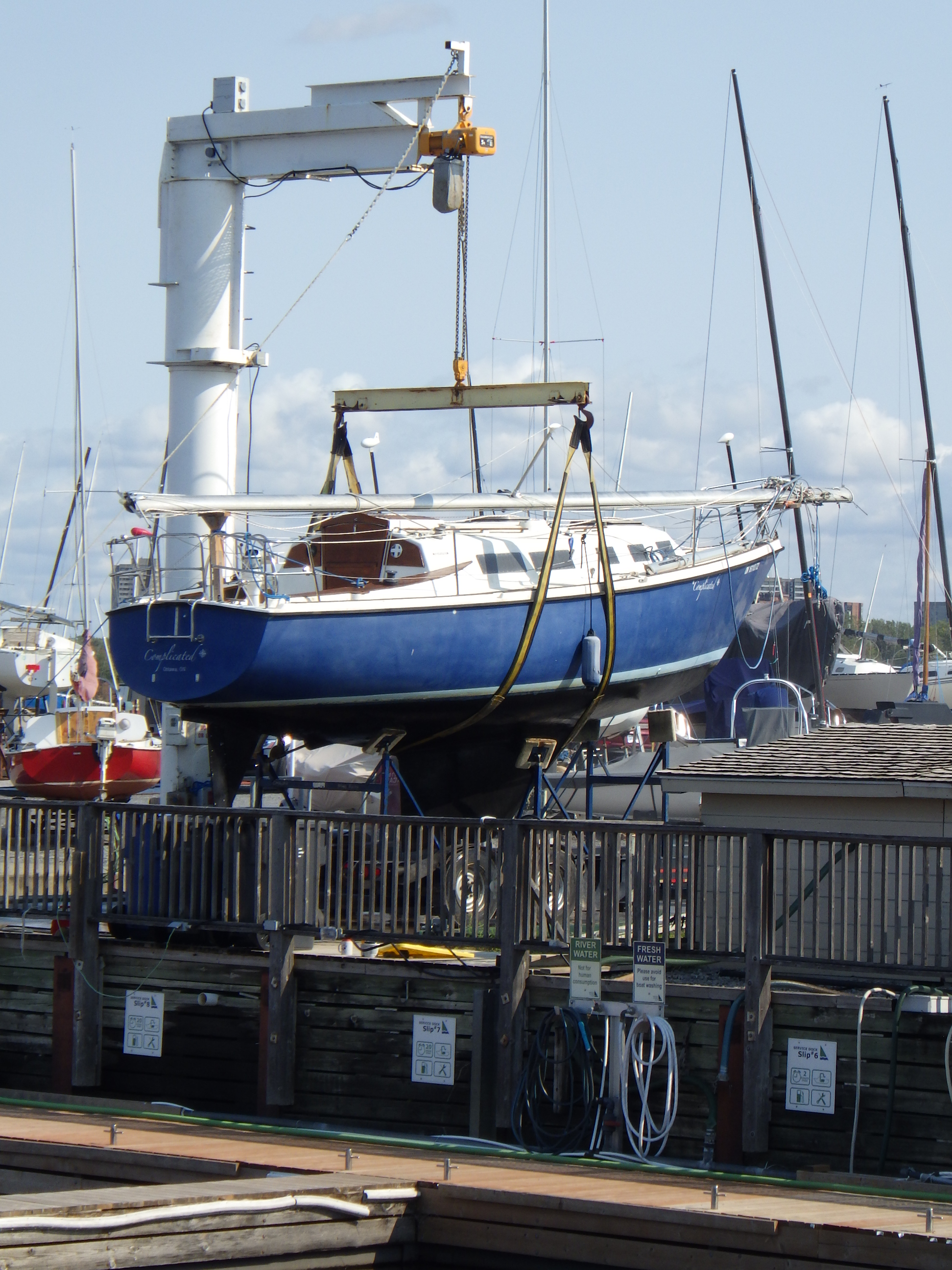

Development
- Designer: McCurdy & Rhodes
- Location: United States
- Year: 1978
- Builder: Seafarer Yachts
- Role: Cruiser-Racer
- Name: Seafarer 30

Boat
- Displacement: 8,600 lb (3,901 kg)
- Draft: 4.75 ft (1.45 m)

Hull
- Type: Monohull
- Construction: Fiberglass
- LOA: 29.95 ft (9.13 m)
- LWL: 25.58 ft (7.80 m)
- Beam: 10.00 ft (3.05 m)
- Engine: Yanmar 2GM diesel engine

Hull appendages
- Keel: fin keel
- Ballast: 3,450 lb (1,565 kg)
- Rudder: skeg-mounted rudder

Rig
- Rig type: Bermuda rig
- I foretriangle height: 37.25 ft (11.35 m)
- J foretriangle base: 12.58 ft (3.83 m)
- P mainsail luff: 31.75 ft (9.68 m)
- E mainsail foot: 9.75 ft (2.97 m)

Sails
- Sailplan: Masthead sloop
- Mainsail area: 154.78 sq ft (14.380 m^{2})
- Jib/genoa area: 234.30 sq ft (21.767 m^{2})
- Total sail area: 389.08 sq ft (36.147 m^{2})

Racing
- PHRF: 181 (average)

The Seafarer 30, also known as the Seafarer Swiftsure 30, is an American sailboat that was designed by McCurdy & Rhodes as a cruiser-racer and first built in 1978.

== Production ==
The design was built by Seafarer Yachts in Huntington, New York, United States between 1978 and 1985, but it is now out of production.

== Design ==
The Seafarer 30 is a recreational keelboat, built predominantly of fiberglass, with teak wood trim. It has a masthead sloop rig, a raked stem, a slightly reverse transom, a skeg-mounted rudder controlled by a wheel and a fixed fin keel or optional centerboard. It displaces 8,600 lb (3,901 kg) and carries 3,450 lb (1,565 kg) of lead ballast.

The keel-equipped version of the boat has a draft of 4.75 ft (1.45 m), while the centerboard-equipped version has a draft of 3.42 ft (1.04 m) with the centreboard retracted.

A tall rig was also available, with a mast about 1.75 ft (0.53 m) taller than standard.

The boat is fitted with a Japanese Yanmar 2GM or Westerbeke diesel engine. The fuel tank holds 20 U.S. gallons (76 L; 17 imp gal) and the fresh water tank has a capacity of 43 U.S. gallons (160 L; 36 imp gal).

The boat's galley is located on the port side of the cabin and includes dual sinks and a three-burner alcohol fueled stove. The head is located forward, just aft of the bow "V"-berth and has a hanging locker and two bi-fold privacy doors. Additional sleeping space is provided by the dinette settees, which has a drop-leaf table, plus two large quarter berths aft, providing sleeping space for eight people. A large chart table is located on the starboard side, just forward of the companionway steps.

Ventilation is provided by a two hatches, one in the forward cabin and one in the main cabin and eight opening ports in the head, while two additional cabin ports are fixed. There are also two Dorade vents.

The boat has internally-mounted halyards, with jiffy-reefing and an outhaul, plus a boom lift. The cockpit has two genoa winches and a third winch for the halyards. The mainsheet traveler is mounted on the bridge deck. Two genoa winches are mounted on the cockpit coaming and two halyard winches on the cabin roof.

The design has a PHRF racing average handicap of 181.

== See also ==
- List of sailing boat types
