= Rhodes 77 =

Sailboat class

Development
- Designer: Philip Rhodes
- Location: United States
- Year: 1947
- No. built: five
- Builder: Burger Boat Company
- Role: Cruiser
- Name: Rhodes 77

Boat
- Displacement: 120,000 lb (54,431 kg)
- Draft: 13.00 ft (3.96 m) with centerboard down

Hull
- Type: monohull
- Construction: fiberglass
- LOA: 77.16 ft (23.52 m)
- LWL: 55.00 ft (16.76 m)
- Beam: 19.00 ft (5.79 m)
- Engine: inboard engine

Hull appendages
- Keel: keel and centerboard
- Ballast: 22,000 lb (9,979 kg)

Sails
- Sailplan: Staysail ketch
- Total sail area: 2,319.00 sq ft (215.442 m^{2})

The Rhodes 77 is an American sailboat that was designed by Philip Rhodes as a cruiser and first built in 1947.

The Rhodes 77 design, initially built from steel, was adapted for aluminum construction by McCurdy & Rhodes in the 1980s.

== Production ==
The design was built by Burger Boat Company in Manitowoc, Wisconsin, United States, who built five boats starting in 1947, but it is now out of production.

A single boat was built in aluminum in place of steel in the 1980s after being redesigned for that material by McCurdy & Rhodes.

== Design ==
The Rhodes 77 is a recreational keelboat, built predominantly of steel, including a steel superstructure, with wood trim. It has a staysail ketch rig; a spooned, raked stem, a raised counter, angled transom, a rudder controlled by a wheel located in a wheelhouse and a fixed fin keel with a retractable centerboard. It displaces 120,000 lb (54,431 kg) and carries 22,000 lb (9,979 kg) of ballast.

The boat has a draft of 13.00 ft (3.96 m) with the centerboard extended and 6.50 ft (1.98 m) with it retracted, allowing operation in shallow water. It is fitted with an inboard engine for docking and maneuvering.

The design has a hull speed of 9.94 kn (18.41 km/h).

== See also ==
- List of sailing boat types
