= Seafarer 31 Mark II =

Sailboat class

Development
- Designer: McCurdy & Rhodes
- Location: United States
- Year: 1974
- Builder: Seafarer Yachts
- Role: Racer-Cruiser
- Name: Seafarer 31 Mark II

Boat
- Displacement: 10,300 lb (4,672 kg)
- Draft: 5.25 ft (1.60 m)

Hull
- Type: monohull
- Construction: fiberglass
- LOA: 31.00 ft (9.45 m)
- LWL: 25.08 ft (7.64 m)
- Beam: 9.75 ft (2.97 m)
- Engine: Universal Atomic 4 30 hp (22 kW) gasoline engine

Hull appendages
- Keel: fin keel
- Ballast: 4,850 lb (2,200 kg)
- Rudder: skeg-mounted rudder

Rig
- Rig type: Bermuda rig
- I foretriangle height: 41.00 ft (12.50 m)
- J foretriangle base: 13.25 ft (4.04 m)
- P mainsail luff: 31.20 ft (9.51 m)
- E mainsail foot: 11.75 ft (3.58 m)

Sails
- Sailplan: masthead sloop
- Mainsail area: 183.30 sq ft (17.029 m^{2})
- Jib/genoa area: 271.63 sq ft (25.235 m^{2})
- Total sail area: 454.93 sq ft (42.264 m^{2})

The Seafarer 31 Mark II is an American sailboat that was designed by McCurdy & Rhodes as a racer-cruiser and first built in 1974.

The design was marketed by the manufacturer as the Seafarer 31 Mark II, to differentiate it from the unrelated William H. Tripp Jr. 1968 Seafarer 31 Mark I design.

== Production ==
The design was built by Seafarer Yachts in the United States, starting in 1974, but it is now out of production.

== Design ==
The Seafarer 31 Mark II is a recreational keelboat, built predominantly of fiberglass, with a balsa-cored deck and with wood trim. It has a masthead sloop rig; a raked stem; a raised counter, reverse transom; a skeg-mounted rudder controlled by a wheel and a fixed fin keel. It displaces 10,300 lb (4,672 kg) and carries 4,850 lb (2,200 kg) of lead ballast.

The boat has a draft of 5.25 ft (1.60 m) with the standard keel.

The boat is fitted with a Universal Atomic 4 30 hp (22 kW) gasoline engine or optionally a Palmer M-60 gasoline engine for docking and maneuvering. The fuel tank holds 20 U.S. gallons (76 L; 17 imp gal) and the fresh water tank has a capacity of 45 U.S. gallons (170 L; 37 imp gal).

The design has sleeping accommodation for five people, with a double "V"-berth in the bow cabin, an L-shaped or optional U-shaped settee around a drop-down table and a straight settee in the main cabin. The galley is located on the port side just forward of the companionway ladder. The galley is U-shaped and is equipped with a three-burner stove, an ice box and a sink. A navigation station is opposite the galley, on the starboard side. The head is located just aft of the bow cabin on the both sides.

The design has a hull speed of 6.71 kn (12.43 km/h).

== See also ==
- List of sailing boat types
