= Seafarer 34 =

Sailboat class

Development
- Designer: McCurdy & Rhodes
- Location: United States
- Year: 1972
- Builder: Seafarer Yachts
- Role: Cruiser

Boat
- Displacement: 11,700 lb (5,307 kg)
- Draft: 5.25 ft (1.60 m)

Hull
- Type: monohull
- Construction: fiberglass
- LOA: 33.75 ft (10.29 m)
- LWL: 25.50 ft (7.77 m)
- Beam: 10.00 ft (3.05 m)
- Engine: Universal Atomic 4 30 hp (22 kW) gasoline engine

Hull appendages
- Keel: fin keel
- Ballast: 4,760 lb (2,159 kg)
- Rudder: skeg-mounted

Rig
- Rig type: Bermuda rig
- I foretriangle height: 41.00 ft (12.50 m)
- J foretriangle base: 13.50 ft (4.11 m)
- P mainsail luff: 35.16 ft (10.72 m)
- E mainsail foot: 12.50 ft (3.81 m)

Sails
- Sailplan: masthead sloop
- Mainsail area: 219.75 sq ft (20.415 m^{2})
- Jib/genoa area: 276.75 sq ft (25.711 m^{2})
- Total sail area: 496.50 sq ft (46.126 m^{2})

The Seafarer 34 is an American sailboat that was designed by McCurdy & Rhodes as a cruiser and first built in 1972.

== Production ==
The design was built by Seafarer Yachts in the United States, starting in 1972, but it is now out of production.

== Design ==
The Seafarer 34 is a recreational keelboat, built predominantly of fiberglass, with a balsa-cored deck. It has a masthead sloop rig or optional yawl rig. The Seafarer 34 Mark II has a slightly taller rig. The hull has a raked stem; a raised counter, reverse transom; a skeg-mounted rudder controlled by a wheel and a fixed fin keel or optional stub keel and centerboard. It displaces 11,700 lb (5,307 kg) and carries 4,760 lb (2,159 kg) of lead ballast.

The keel-equipped version of the boat has a draft of 5.25 ft (1.60 m), while the centerboard-equipped version has a draft of 7.00 ft (2.13 m) with the centerboard extended and 3.75 ft (1.14 m) with it retracted, allowing operation in shallow water.

The boat is fitted with a Universal Atomic 4 30 hp (22 kW) gasoline engine for docking and maneuvering. A diesel engine was a factory option. The fuel tank holds 20 U.S. gallons (76 L; 17 imp gal).

The design has sleeping accommodation for five people, with a double "V"-berth in the bow cabin, an L-shaped, or optional U-shaped, settee around a drop-down table in the main cabin that forms a double berth. A straight settee on the starboard side is a single berth. The galley is located on the starboard side of the companionway ladder and is equipped with a stove, an ice box and a sink. A navigation station is opposite the galley, on the port side. The head is located just aft of the bow cabin on the port side. The fresh water tank has a capacity of 40 U.S. gallons (150 L; 33 imp gal)

The design has a hull speed of 6.77 kn (12.54 km/h).

== See also ==
- List of sailing boat types
