= Seafarer 26 =

Sailboat class

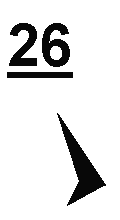

Development
- Designer: McCurdy & Rhodes
- Location: United States
- Year: 1977
- Builder: Seafarer Yachts
- Role: Cruiser

Boat
- Displacement: 4,600 lb (2,087 kg)
- Draft: 3.75 ft (1.14 m)

Hull
- Type: monohull
- Construction: fiberglass
- LOA: 25.75 ft (7.85 m)
- LWL: 22.75 ft (6.93 m)
- Beam: 8.25 ft (2.51 m)
- Engine: Yanmar 1GM diesel engine

Hull appendages
- Keel: fin keel
- Ballast: 1,775 lb (805 kg)
- Rudder: skeg-mounted rudder

Rig
- Rig type: Bermuda rig
- I foretriangle height: 30.50 ft (9.30 m)
- J foretriangle base: 10.65 ft (3.25 m)
- P mainsail luff: 25.25 ft (7.70 m)
- E mainsail foot: 8.50 ft (2.59 m)

Sails
- Sailplan: masthead sloop
- Mainsail area: 107.31 sq ft (9.969 m^{2})
- Jib/genoa area: 162.41 sq ft (15.088 m^{2})
- Total sail area: 269.73 sq ft (25.059 m^{2})

The Seafarer 26 is an American sailboat that was designed by McCurdy & Rhodes a cruiser and first built in 1977.

== Production ==
The design was built by Seafarer Yachts in the United States, starting in 1977, but it is now out of production.

== Design ==
The Seafarer 26 is a recreational keelboat, built predominantly of solid laminate fiberglass, with wood trim. It has a masthead sloop rig, a raked stem, a slightly reverse transom, a skeg-mounted rudder controlled by a wheel and a fixed fin keel or optional shoal draft keel. It displaces 4,600 lb (2,087 kg) and carries 1,775 lb (805 kg) of ballast.

The boat has a draft of 3.75 ft (1.14 m) with the standard keel and 2.58 ft (0.79 m) with the optional shoal draft keel.

The boat is normally fitted with a small outboard motor or optionally with an inboard Japanese Yanmar 1GM diesel engine for docking and maneuvering.

The design has sleeping accommodation for four people, with a double "V"-berth in the bow cabin and two straight settee berths in the main cabin around a drop-leaf table. The galley is located on both sides of the companionway ladder, with a two-burner stove to starboard and an ice box and sink to port. The head is located just aft of the bow cabin. The fresh water tank has a capacity of 43 U.S. gallons (160 L; 36 imp gal).

The design has a hull speed of 6.39 kn (11.83 km/h).

== See also ==
- List of sailing boat types
