= Seafarer Yachts =

Sailboat class

- Company type: Privately held company
- Industry: Boat building
- Founded: 1950s
- Defunct: 1985
- Headquarters: Huntington, New York, United States
- Products: Sailboats

Seafarer Fiberglass Yachts, Inc. (usually called Seafarer Yachts) was an American sailboat importer, distributor and boat builder based in Huntington, New York. The company specialized in the design and manufacture of fiberglass sailboats.

The company was founded in the 1950s as an importer, started building its own sailboats in 1965 and went out of business in 1985, following the early 1980s recession in the United States and the downturn in the sailboat market.

== History ==
The company started off in the 1950s as an importer and distributor of sailboats built in Amsterdam, Netherlands by DeVries Lentsch. The company then set up its own manufacturing operation in a building in Huntington, New York that had been built as a supermarket and starting building sailboats in 1964. Many of the boats built were designed by James A. McCurdy and Philip ("Bodie") H. Rhodes of McCurdy & Rhodes, like the Seafarer 22, although some boats were by Sparkman & Stephens, like the Sailmaster 22.

== Boats ==
Summary of boats imported or built by Seafarer Yachts:

- Swiftsure 33 - 1959
- Javelin 38 - 1960
- Meridian 25 - 1960
- Polaris 26 - 1960
- Seafarer Bahama 35 MS - 1960
- Seafarer 45 - 1961
- Seafarer 23 Kestrel - 1963
- Sailmaster 22 - 1963
- Tripp 30 - 1963
- Burgess Atlantic - 1965
- Rhodes Ranger 29 - 1965
- Seafarer 46 - 1967
- Seafarer 31 Mark I - 1968
- Seafarer 36C - 1968
- Seafarer 48 - 1969
- Rhodes 38 - 1971
- Seafarer 38 Ketch - 1971
- Seafarer 29 - 1972
- Seafarer 34 - 1972
- Seafarer 38C - 1972
- Seafarer 24 - 1974
- Seafarer 31 Mark II - 1974
- Seafarer 22 - 1976
- Seafarer 23 - 1976
- Seafarer 26 - 1977
- Seafarer 23 Challenger - 1978
- Seafarer 30 - 1978
- Swiftsure 30 - 1978
- Seafarer 37 - 1980

== See also ==
- List of sailboat designers and manufacturers
