= Seafarer 45 =

Sailboat class

Development
- Designer: Sparkman & Stephens
- Location: Netherlands
- Year: 1961
- Builder: Werf Gusto
- Role: Racer-Cruiser

Boat
- Displacement: 25,000 lb (11,340 kg)
- Draft: 6.42 ft (1.96 m)

Hull
- Type: monohull
- Construction: fiberglass
- LOA: 45.08 ft (13.74 m)
- LWL: 30.33 ft (9.24 m)
- Beam: 11.00 ft (3.35 m)
- Engine: Gray Marine 491 gasoline engine

Hull appendages
- Keel: modified long keel
- Ballast: 9,500 lb (4,309 kg)
- Rudder: keel-mounted rudder

Rig
- Rig type: Bermuda rig
- I foretriangle height: 50.00 ft (15.24 m)
- J foretriangle base: 16.25 ft (4.95 m)
- P mainsail luff: 44.00 ft (13.41 m)
- E mainsail foot: 21.50 ft (6.55 m)

Sails
- Sailplan: masthead sloop
- Mainsail area: 473.00 sq ft (43.943 m^{2})
- Jib/genoa area: 406.25 sq ft (37.742 m^{2})
- Total sail area: 879.25 sq ft (81.685 m^{2})

The Seafarer 45 is a Dutch sailboat that was designed by Americans Sparkman & Stephens as a racer-cruiser and first built in 1961. The sloop version was S&S design #1618 and the yawl version design #1618.1.

The boat was later sold under the name Sailmaster 45.

== Production ==
The design was built by Werf Gusto in the Netherlands, starting in 1961 and imported into the United States by Seafarer Yachts, but it is now out of production.

== Design ==
The Seafarer 45 is a recreational keelboat, built predominantly of fiberglass, with mahogany and teak wood trim. It has a masthead sloop rig or optional yawl rig, with the addition of a mizzen mast. The hull has a raked stem; a raised counter, angled transom; a keel-mounted rudder controlled by a wheel and a fixed modified long keel, with a cutaway forefoot. The sloop version displaces 25,000 lb (11,340 kg) and carries 9,500 lb (4,309 kg) of lead ballast, while the yawl model displaces 25,000 lb (11,340 kg) and carries 9,250 lb (4,196 kg) of ballast.

The boat has a draft of 6.42 ft (1.96 m) with the standard keel.

The boat is fitted with a Gray Marine 491 gasoline engine for docking and maneuvering. The fuel tank holds 55 U.S. gallons (210 L; 46 imp gal) and the fresh water tank has a capacity of 250 U.S. gallons (950 L; 210 imp gal).

The design has sleeping accommodation for eight people, with a double "V"-berth in the bow cabin, two straight settee berths and two pilot berths in the main cabin and an aft cabin with a double berth. The galley is located on the port side at the companionway ladder. The galley is U-shaped and is equipped with a three-burner stove, an ice box and a sink. A navigation station is opposite the galley, on the starboard side. There are two heads, one just aft of the bow cabin on the port side and one on the starboard side at the companionway.

The design has a hull speed of 7.38 kn (13.67 km/h).

== See also ==
- List of sailing boat types
