= Hinckley Yachts =

American manufacturer of boats

Hinckley Yachts, founded in 1928, manufactures, services and sells luxury sail and powerboats. The company is based in Maine, United States. The company has developed yacht technologies including JetStick and Dual Guard composite material, and was an early developer of the fiberglass hull. Currently, Hinckley operates service yards in seven locations along the east coast of the United States, making it one of the most integrated boating concerns in the United States. Hinckley’s present yacht line includes boats ranging in size from 29 to 55 feet. All of Hinckley’s yachts are built to order with customization of the interior and exterior cosmetics as required by the purchaser.

== History ==
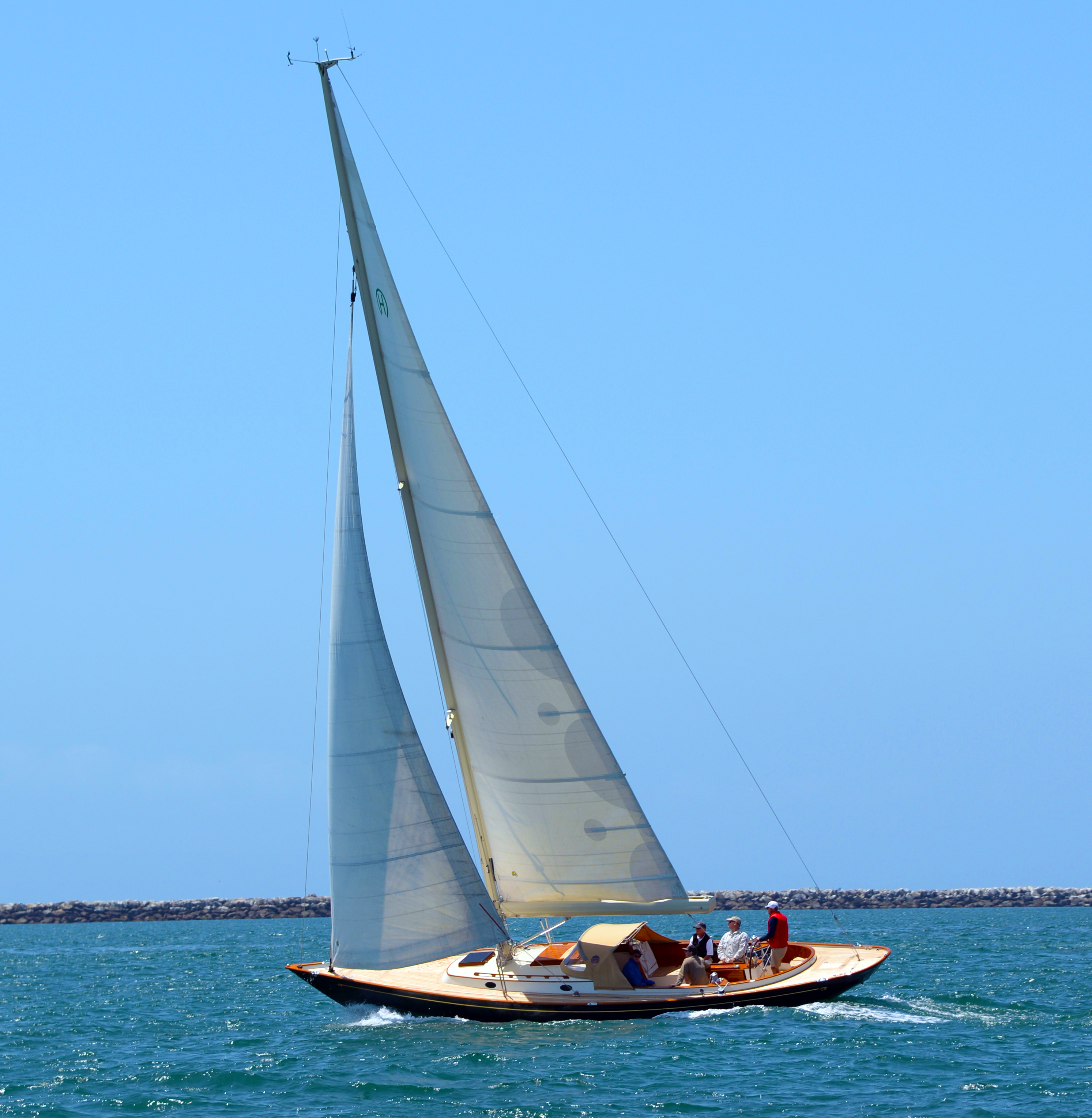
Hinckley Daysailor 42

Hinckley was founded in 1928 by Benjamin B. Hinckley after he purchased a small boatyard in Southwest Harbor, ME. In 1932 Benjamin’s son, Henry R. Hinckley, an engineering graduate from Cornell, took control of the company. A 36-foot “fisherman motorboat” dubbed “Ruthyeolyn” built in 1933 was Hinckley’s first boat. Five years later, in 1938, Hinckley came out with its first sailing vessel, a 28-foot Sparkman & Stephens sloop. Hinckley would go on to produce 20 of these sloops, making them the company’s first mass production line. Straying away from boatbuilding, Hinckley opened Manset Marine Supply Company in 1940 for which he designed many fittings for fuel tanks, stanchions, deck plates, and the like that are still utilized today.

At the start of World War II, Hinckley turned to manufacturing war-designed boats. At the end of the war Hinckley’s contributions totaled nearly 40% of all war boats built in Maine, for which the company was awarded two Army-Navy “E’s” for excellence in 1942 and 1943. Hinckley’s production of pleasure boats began soon after the war.

In 1945 the Sou’wester sailboat was created. 62 original Sou’Westers were built, making it the largest fleet of single design cruising boats of its time. During the 1950s, Hinckley began experimenting with the use of fiberglass to construct his yachts’ hulls by building small runabouts. His first fiberglass sailboat, the Bermuda 40, was launched in 1960. The last Hinckley-built wooden boat was the 1960 “Osprey.” Throughout the 1960s the company provided navigation systems along with auto-pilot and electric-powered furling mainsails.

In 1979 Henry Hinckley sold the company to Richard Tucker. Tucker hired William Moyer to run the company where he oversaw the development of the Sou’wester 42. Due to the recession of the early 80’s, the luxury sail boat market fell on hard times and Tucker made the decision to sell the company. In 1982, Henry’s son Bob bought the company back with the help of his business partner Shepard McKenney. The two released Hinckley’s first fiberglass powerboat christened “Talaria” in 1989. The last of the Bermuda 40’s was produced in 1991, bringing the total number of B40’s produced to 203 over its 32-year lifespan.

Hinckley became the first American boat company to use SCRIMP technology (a method of making composite material with nearly no volatile organic compound emissions) in its yachts, for which Hinckley was awarded the United States Environmental Protection Agency’s Environmental Merit Award in 1994. Also in 1994, the company first used its jet propulsion technology.

The company again fell under new ownership in 1997 when it was purchased by The Bain, Willard Companies for approximately $20 million. William Bain, Ralph Willard, and Alexander Spaulding took over operations. Under the new ownership, Hinckley began to market power boats equipped with jet drives. The company also developed more advanced fiberglass construction techniques dubbed "Dual Guard", which aimed to create a stronger hull.

In 2001 Bain, Willard Companies sold a 51% controlling interest in The Hinckley Company to Cambridge, Massachusetts based Monitor Clipper Partners for $40 million in debt and equity.

== Company overview ==
Hinckley currently conducts operations in twelve U.S. locations. Due to economic forces the company reduced its workforce in mid-2008 to 305 at the end of August 2009. By May 2017, The Hinckley Company employed 685 workers in its boatyards, boat building and corporate facilities in the U.S. Hinckley acquired Hunt Yachts in August 2014 and Morris Yachts the following year. The acquisitions added two boat building facilities and one additional yacht yard which are all continuing operations.

== Current yachts ==
Hinckley’s current line of yachts includes seven powerboats ranging in length from 29 to 55 feet and two sailing vessels from 42 to 50 feet (each boat’s length is represented by the number preceded by its name). The powerboats are made up of three Talaria models, which are offered with or without flybridges so some may consider this six models; two Picnic Boats; three runabouts and one center console. The Talaria fleet was first built in 1989. The present line includes: Center Console 29; Runabout 29, Runabout 34, Runabout 38, Picnic Boat 34, Picnic Boat 37, Talaria 43 FB/MY, Talaria 48 FB/MY and Talaria 55 FB/MY The Runabout 38 includes a “hydraulically operated convertible top” and is “all about curves, shadows, highlights, and reflections”. The Talaria 43 was lauded by the press and appeared on the covers of Powerand Motoryacht magazine and Yachting magazine in October 2014 following its introduction that year.

== The Bermuda 40 ==
The Bermuda 40, designed by William H. Tripp, Jr., was introduced in 1959 as Hinckley’s first fiberglass boat. According to Jack Horner of spinsheet.com “the B-40 was to become the bellwether for future production and established Hinckley as the premier North American Yacht builder of exceptional quality sailing yachts”. The last B40 was built in 1991, ending its 32nd year of production with the 203rd rendition of the trendsetting yacht.

== The Picnic Boat ==
In 1994 Hinckley put forth the first Picnic Boat. "Many explanations for the phenomenal success of the Picnic Boat have been proffered, but all eventually come down to aesthetics. The sinuous shape perfectly manages to express the two worlds from which this boat sprang--yachts and lobster boats-- and its proportions are inherently pleasing to the nautical eye."

The Picnic Boat style was created by Hinckley and is a registered trademark of the company. Originally designed with jet propulsion, the Picnic Boat led to the development of the JetStick.

== Research and development ==
Hinckley introduced the JetStick, Dual Guard composite material, and the use of fiberglass. The first experiments with fiberglass began during the 1950s and concluded with the creation of the B40 in 1959. Despite much criticism such as the comparison of fiberglass to “frozen snot,” Hinckley used the material in boatbuilding . Hinckley created Dual Guard technology in 1999, a composite composed of an aramid and carbon fiber, aimed at creating a stronger and more efficient hull. In 2016, the company launched a remote monitoring system called OnWatch. OnWatch uses a series of sensors to track numerous data points on a boat and relay them via a cellular system to servers that update a mobile Web site (it feels like an app when you add the OnWatch icon to your smartphone homescreen). Once you log in, it gives you a homescreen with an at-a-glance understanding of how your boat is doing, from technical details such as engine status, bilge, battery, and fuel-tank levels, to the state of your shore power connectivity.

The JetStick, designed by Control Engineering, Inc., was first used in 1998. The computer-integrated design allows the skipper to control and dock the boat through the use of a joystick. To use the JetStick the driver pushes a button to engage docking mode, this in turn disengages the wheel while a computer determines the amount of bow thruster and jet needed to move the boat sideways.

== Boats ==
- Bermuda 40
- Hinckley 42 Competition
- Hinckley 43 (Hood)
- Hinckley 43 (Hood)-2
- Hinckley 43 (McCurdy & Rhodes)
- Hinckley 48 (Tripp)
- Pilot 35
- Shields (keelboat)
- Sou'wester 42/43
- Sou'wester 51
- Sou'wester 51 CC
- Sou'wester 59

== See also ==
- List of sailboat designers and manufacturers
