= Seafarer 31 Mark I =

Sailboat class

Seafarer 31 Mark I Sloop
Development
- Designer: William H. Tripp Jr., McCurdy & Rhodes
- Location: United States
- Year: 1968
- Builder: Seafarer Yachts
- Role: Racer-Cruiser
- Name: Seafarer 31 Mark I Sloop

Boat
- Displacement: 8,750 lb (3,969 kg)
- Draft: 4.50 ft (1.37 m)

Hull
- Type: monohull
- Construction: fiberglass
- LOA: 31.16 ft (9.50 m)
- LWL: 22.33 ft (6.81 m)
- Beam: 8.83 ft (2.69 m)
- Engine: Universal Atomic 4 30 hp (22 kW) gasoline engine

Hull appendages
- Keel: fin keel
- Ballast: 3,400 lb (1,542 kg)
- Rudder: skeg-mounted rudder

Rig
- Rig type: Bermuda rig
- I foretriangle height: 36.50 ft (11.13 m)
- J foretriangle base: 11.70 ft (3.57 m)
- P mainsail luff: 31.20 ft (9.51 m)
- E mainsail foot: 13.00 ft (3.96 m)

Sails
- Sailplan: masthead sloop
- Mainsail area: 202.80 sq ft (18.841 m^{2})
- Jib/genoa area: 213.53 sq ft (19.838 m^{2})
- Total sail area: 416.33 sq ft (38.678 m^{2})

The Seafarer 31 Mark I is an American sailboat that was designed by William H. Tripp Jr., with design development by McCurdy & Rhodes, as a racer-cruiser and first built in 1968.

The design was originally marketed by the manufacturer as the Seafarer 31, but is now usually referred to as the Seafarer 31 Mark I to differentiate it from the unrelated McCurdy and Rhodes-designed 1974 Seafarer 31 Mark II.

== Production ==
The design was built by Seafarer Yachts in the United States, starting in 1968, but it is now out of production. Boats were offered complete or in kit form under the name Seacraft Kits for amateur-completion.

== Design ==
The Seafarer 31 Mark I is a recreational keelboat, built predominantly of fiberglass with a solid hull and balsa-cored deck, with wood trim. It has a masthead sloop rig wkith an optional tall mast or an optional yawl rig. The hull has a spooned, raked stem; a raised counter, angled transom, a skeg-mounted rudder controlled by a tiller and a fixed fin keel. The sloop model displaces 8,750 lb (3,969 kg) and carries 3,400 lb (1,542 kg) of lead ballast, while the yawl model displaces 8,750 lb (3,969 kg) and carries 3,350 lb (1,520 kg) of lead ballast.

The boat has a draft of 4.50 ft (1.37 m) with the standard keel.

The boat is fitted with a Universal Atomic 4 30 hp (22 kW) gasoline engine for docking and maneuvering.

The design has sleeping accommodation for four people, with a double "V"-berth in the bow cabin and two straight settee berths in the main cabin. The galley is located on the starboard side just aft of the bow cabin. The galley is equipped with a two-burner stove, an ice box and a double sink. The head is located just aft of the bow cabin on the port side.

The design has a hull speed of 6.33 kn (11.72 km/h).

== See also ==
- List of sailing boat types
