= Seafarer 38 =

Sailboat class

Development
- Designer: Philip Rhodes
- Location: United States
- Year: 1971
- Builder: Seafarer Yachts
- Role: Cruiser

Boat
- Displacement: 16,500 lb (7,484 kg)
- Draft: 4.50 ft (1.37 m)

Hull
- Type: monohull
- Construction: fiberglass
- LOA: 37.75 ft (11.51 m)
- LWL: 27.25 ft (8.31 m)
- Beam: 10.50 ft (3.20 m)
- Engine: Perkins Engines 108 diesel engine

Hull appendages
- Keel: modified long keel
- Ballast: 5,500 lb (2,495 kg)
- Rudder: keel-mounted rudder

Rig
- Rig type: Bermuda rig
- I foretriangle height: 36.80 ft (11.22 m)
- J foretriangle base: 14.70 ft (4.48 m)
- P mainsail luff: 31.20 ft (9.51 m)
- E mainsail foot: 14.00 ft (4.27 m)

Sails
- Sailplan: masthead sloop
- Mainsail area: 218.40 sq ft (20.290 m^{2})
- Jib/genoa area: 270.48 sq ft (25.128 m^{2})
- Total sail area: 488.88 sq ft (45.418 m^{2})

The Seafarer 38 is an American sailboat that was designed by Philip Rhodes as a cruiser and first built in 1971.

The Seafarer 38 was also sold as the Rhodes 38, Seafarer 38 Ketch and the Seafarer 38C.

== Production ==
The design was built by Seafarer Yachts in the United States, starting in 1971, but it is now out of production.

== Design ==
The Seafarer 38 is a recreational keelboat, built predominantly of fiberglass, with wood trim. It has a masthead sloop rig, optional cutter rig or optional ketch rig. Short or tall masts were also options, as was a bowsprit for the cutter rig.

The hull has a clipper bow; a raised counter, angled transom; a keel-mounted rudder controlled by a wheel and a fixed, modified long keel, with a cutaway forefoot. It displaces 16,500 lb (7,484 kg) and carries 5,500 lb (2,495 kg) of lead ballast. The boat has a draft of 4.50 ft (1.37 m) with the standard keel.

The boat is fitted with a British Perkins Engines 108 diesel engine for docking and maneuvering. The fuel tank holds 60 U.S. gallons (230 L; 50 imp gal) and the fresh water tank has a capacity of 150 U.S. gallons (570 L; 120 imp gal).

The design has sleeping accommodation for six people, with a double "V"-berth in the bow cabin, an U-shaped settee in the main cabin around a drop-down table and an aft cabin with two single berths. The galley is located on the starboard side just forward of the companionway ladder. The galley is equipped with a three-burner stove, an ice box and a double sink. A navigation station is opposite the galley, on the starboard side. The head is located just aft of the bow cabin on the port side and includes a shower.

The design has a hull speed of 7.0 kn (13.0 km/h).

== See also ==
- List of sailing boat types
