= Invicta (sailboat) =

Development
- Year: 1960
- Builder: Pearson Yachts (Bristol, RI)

Boat
- Draft: 2.35 m (7 ft 9 in) (with centerboard); 1.37 m (4 ft 6 in) (without centerboard)

Hull
- LOA: 11.51 m (37 ft 9 in)
- LWL: 7.62 m (25 ft 0 in)
- Beam: 3.22 m (10 ft 7 in)

Rig
- Rig type: Yawl

Sails
- Total sail area: 57.96 m^{2} (623.9 sq ft) (fore-and-aft rig)

The Pearson Invicta is a 38-foot (12 m) sailboat designed for ocean racing. It has a fiberglass sloop with wood trim. Sailboats were once made solely of wood however, the Invicta was the first sailboat produced with a fiberglass hull to win a major ocean race (the 1964 Newport, Rhode Island to Bermuda), being placed second overall in the 1962 Newport to Bermuda Race. It was its first in its class and first overall. Thus permanently influencing the course of sailboat design. The Pearson Invicta was designed by noted naval architect William H. Tripp Jr and was produced by Pearson Yachts located in Bristol, Rhode Island.

The Invicta's design philosophy followed a line established earlier by the beamy keel centerboard yawl Finisterre which was designed by Sparkman and Stephens for noted yachtsman Carlton Mitchell. Mitchell won the Newport to Bermuda Race three times (1956, 1958, and 1960) in Finisterre. These yachts were designed under the Cruising Club of America (CCA) rule. This rule was a handicapping system that resulted in dual purpose boats that could be used for safe family cruising as well as competitive handicap racing. These designs featured long overhangs at the bow and stern and curved "springy" sheer lines giving these yachts intrinsic beauty. As the yacht heeled over in the wind, more waterline length became available thus increasing theoretical hull speed.

The Invicta's designer, William Tripp, following the concept of Finisterre, developed a series of keel centerboard fiberglass production boats including: the Block Island 40 (built first in the Netherlands and later in East Greenwich Rhode Island), the Mercer 44 (built first in New Jersey by Mercer Reinforced Plastics and currently by Cape Cod Shipbuilding in Wareham MA), the Bermuda 40 and'Hinckley 48 (built in Southwest Harbor Maine by the Hinckley Company). Mr. Tripp's unfortunate death in 1971 ended his career far too soon at the height of his design prominence.

This is distinct from the Van de Stadt designed Folkboat derivative Invicta 26.
