= Trippy (disambiguation) =

Trippy is a travel website.

Trippy may also refer to:

- Tripping (psychedelics), a drug-induced altered state of consciousness
- Trippy, a character in the film Mr. Skeffington
- "Trippy", a song from Lil Wayne's 2013 album I Am Not a Human Being II
- Trippy Turtle (born Peder Losnegård, 1992), Norwegian musician also known as Lido
- Charles Trippy (born 1984), American musician and internet personality
- Chaz Trippy, percussionist in the Gregg Allman Band

== See also ==
- TRP.P a Canadian R&B duo from Toronto, Canada
- Trippi (disambiguation)
- Trippie Redd (born 1999), American rapper
- Tripy Makonda (born 1990), French footballer
