= Philip Rhodes =

- Born: 1895
- Died: 1974 (aged 78–79)
- Occupation: Naval architect

Philip Leonard Rhodes (1895–1974) was an American naval architect known for his diverse yacht designs.

== Life ==
Rhodes designed a wide variety of vessels from 7' dinghies to 123' motor-sailors, from hydrofoil racers to America's Cup winners - his 12 Meter class Weatherly (USA-17) winning the 1962 defense. His work also included large motor yachts, commercial and military vessels such as minesweepers and police boats. His clients ranged from Rockefellers to Sears & Roebuck.

Rhodes was born in 1895 in Thurman, Ohio. He attended MIT, graduating in 1918 in naval architecture and marine engineering. He worked for the US Army Corps of Engineers during World War I. After the war he began work as a shipfitter in Lorain, Ohio. He later moved to New York where he opened a small office as a marine architect.

Rhodes joined the design firm of Cox & Stevens in 1934, becoming head naval architect there after the death of lead designer Bruno Tornroth in 1935. In 1946, the firm of Philip L. Rhodes succeeded Cox & Stevens Inc. It closed in 1974 following Rhodes's death.

Rhodes formed his own company, Philip L. Rhodes, Naval Architects and Marine Engineers.

Rhodes was one of the pioneers in the transition to fiberglass construction. The Bounty II for Coleman Plastics and Aeromarine in 1956 became one of the earliest yachts built of fiberglass, and established the viability of the new material for larger production boats.

== Designs ==
- Chesapeake 32
- Northern 25
- Mariner 19
- Meridian 25
- Rhodes 18
- Rhodes 19
- Rhodes 22
- Rhodes 33
- Rhodes Evergreen
- Rhodes 27 38 foot International Rule, racer cruiser
- Rhodes Seabreeze class, a 33-foot sloop sold by Seafarer Yachts
- Rhodes Meridian, a 24-foot sloop sold by Seafarer Yachts
- Pearson Vanguard, a 33-foot sloop built in Rhode Island by Pearson Yachts
- Aeromarine Bounty II - a 41ft sloop or yawl, built by Aeromarine in Sausalito California. Accredited as being the first glassfibre production yacht.
- Pearson Rhodes 41 a 41-foot sloop based on the Bounty II, built in Rhode Island by Pearson Yachts
- Rhodes Reliant, a 41-foot sloop or yawl based on the Bounty II, built by Cheoy Lee Shipyard in Hong Kong
- Rhodes 77
- Cheoy Lee Offshore 40
- Rhodes Bantam, a 14-foot sloop (daysailer/racer)
- O'Day Tempest 23
- Seafarer Bahama 35 MS
- Seafarer 36C
- Seafarer 38/Rhodes 38
- Swiftsure 33
- Woodpussy
- Grumman Dinghy, an innovative aluminum dinghy designed to use Grumman Aircraft's post-war excess manufacturing capacity
- O'Day Widgeon, a 12-foot sailing dinghy
- O'Day Sprite, a 10-foot fiberglass sailing dinghy
- Outlaw 26
- International Penguin Class racing dinghy
- Dyer Dhow, one of the first production fiberglass boats
- Dyer Dink
