= Tripi (disambiguation) =

Tripi is a town and commune in Sicily, Italy.

Tripi may also refer to:

- Filippo Tripi (born 2002), Italian footballer

== See also ==
- Trippi (disambiguation)
- Tripy Makonda (born 1990), French footballer
