= William H. Tripp Jr =

American sailboat designer

William H. Tripp Jr (1920–1971) was an American naval architect who created many popular wooden and later fiberglass sailboat designs. Tripp used the diminutive, Bill, as his usual first name.

== Life ==
Tripp was a native of Long Island, New York. He started as a yacht designer working for Phillip Rhodes, before the Second World War. After returning from his military service in the war he worked for Sparkman & Stephens.

In 1952 Tripp started his own design firm with Bill Campbell, Tripp & Campbell, located in a small office on the seventh floor of 10 Rockefeller Plaza. One of his early wooden boat designs, a 48-foot flush-deck sloop was built by German shipbuilder Abeking and Rasmussen designed for Jack Potter of Oyster Bay, Long Island and named Touche. It accumulated a successful race record and elevated Tripp's reputation as a designer, bringing him many commissions for new boats.

Tripp began experimenting with a new material for hull construction and began designing boats for fiberglass, becoming a pioneer in the field.

Tripp was not only a designer, but also an accomplished sailor and sailed many of his own designs. Cruising World listed his Columbia 50 as number 17 of the 40 best sailboats of all time.

Tripp was not happy with his professional partnership with Campbell and dissolved the company and formed his own, based in his home town of Port Washington, New York. Campbell found a new partner, Dick Sheehan and carried on as Campbell/Sheehan.

Biographer Ted Jones wrote of Tripp's designs: "Thinking back, I can see many innovations Bill’s fertile imagination introduced. While he did not create the wide beam, shallow draft centerboarder ... he surely refined the type to the extent that he became associated with centerboard racing/cruising boats. The wide transom, low counter design of his boats’ sterns were quite new in the late 1950s, causing many derisive comments among traditionalists, but I don’t hear anyone laughing about the shape of the Bermuda 40’s stern anymore ... He designed boats to stay together under the most difficult circumstances. I cannot recall one of his designs ever being dismasted or suffering structural damage at sea."

== Death ==
Tripp died in 1971 in an automobile accident, at age 51. Tripp was killed by a drunk driver on the Connecticut Turnpike. The other driver lost control of his car and crossed the road divider, colliding with Tripp’s Jaguar.

Tripp's son, William H. Tripp III is also a yacht designer. Biographer Ted Jones wrote, "Bill’s son, Billy, was too young at the time of his father’s death to be able to understand what it was that made his father’s boat designs special, yet he has now exceeded his father in this specialized field."

== Designs ==
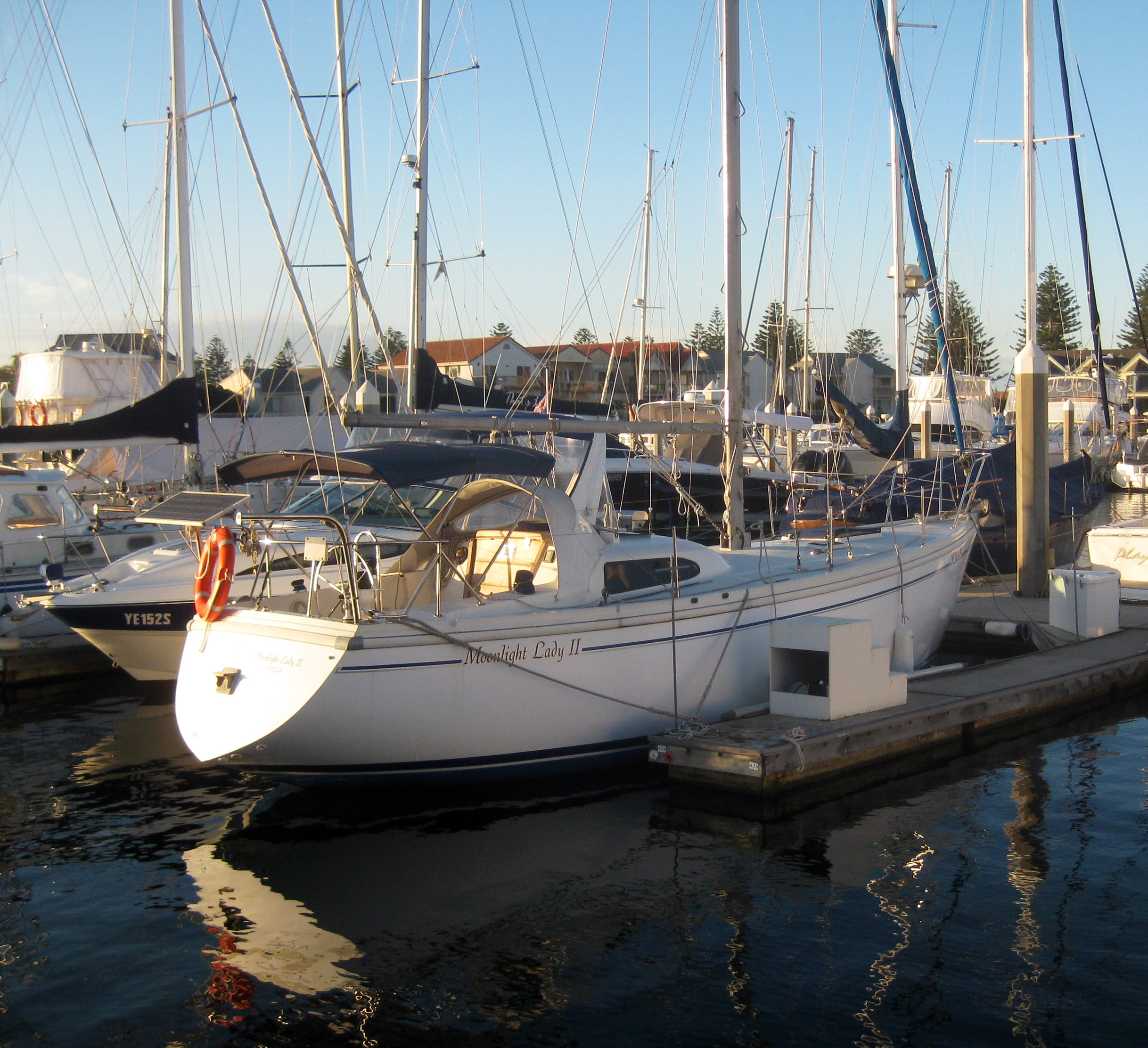
The Tripp-designed Columbia 34 Mark II

- Bermuda 40-1 (Hinckley) - 1959
- Bermuda 40-2 (Hinckley) - 1968
- Bermuda 40-3 (Hinckley) - 1971
- Block Island 40 - 1957
- Block Island 40 (Migrator) - 1984
- Columbia 26 Mark II - 1969
- Columbia 27 - 1970
- Columbia 30 - 1971
- Columbia 32 - 1975
- Columbia 34 Mark II - 1970
- Columbia 35 - 1975
- Columbia 39 - 1970
- Columbia 41 - 1972
- Columbia 43 - 1969
- Columbia 43 CB - 1969
- Columbia 43 Mark III - 1973
- Columbia 45 - 1971
- Columbia 45 Ketch - 1971
- Columbia 50 - 1965
- Columbia 52 - 1971
- Columbia 56 - 1974
- Columbia 57 - 1969
- Coronado 27 - 1970
- Coronado 32 - 1973
- Coronado 34 - 1966
- Coronado 35 - 1971
- Coronado 35 MS - 1971
- Coronado 41 - 1972
- Coronado 45 - 1974
- Galaxy 32 - 1957
- Galaxy 32-3 - 1970
- Grampian 46 - 1969
- Hinckley 48 - 1965
- Hughes 36 - 1971
- Hughes-Columbia 36 - 1979
- Invicta (Tripp) - 1960
- Invicta II (Tripp) - 1964
- Javelin 38 (Tripp) - 1960
- Le Comte 52 - 1965
- Le Comte ALC 35 - 1968
- Le Comte ALC 35 Mark II - 1971
- Le Comte Medalist 33 Mark I - 1962
- Le Comte Medalist 33 Mark II - 1965
- Le Comte Ocean Racer 52 - 1968
- Mercer 44 - 1959
- Northeast 38-1 - 1962
- Northeast 38-2 - 1966
- Northeast 38-3 - 1969
- Oceanic 48 (Tripp) - 1962
- Paceship 32 (Tripp) - 1968
- Polaris 26 (Tripp) - 1960
- Tripp Resolute - 1955
- Sailcrafter 32 - 1977
- Sailcrafter 50 - 1971
- Sailmaster 26 - 1963
- Santander 30 (Tripp) - 1966
- Seafarer 31 Mark I - 1968
- Seafarer 31 Mark I Yawl - 1968
- Seaman 30 - 1955
- Tripp 30 (Seafarer) - 1963
- Tripp Lentsch 29 - 1963
- US Yachts US 41 - 1963
- US Yachts US 46 - 1968
- Watkins 32 - 1982
- Watkins 33 - 1984
- Watkins 36 - 1981
- Watkins 36C - 1981
