= Thierry Magon de La Villehuchet =

French businessman (1943–2008)

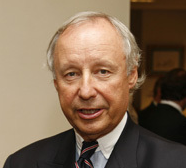
- Born: 23 April 1943; Saint-Malo, France
- Died: 22 December 2008 (aged 65); New York City, New York, United States
- Cause of death: Suicide
- Occupation: Investment manager
- Known for: Founder of Access International Advisors
- Relatives: Bertrand Magon de La Villehuchet (brother)

René-Thierry Magon de la Villehuchet (23 April 1943 – 22 December 2008) was a French aristocrat, money manager, and businessman. He was one of the founders of Access International Advisors (AIA Group), a company caught and subsumed in the Madoff investment scandal in 2008. He died by suicide after losing an estimated $1.4 billion in Madoff's scheme.

== Early life ==
René-Thierry Magon de la Villehuchet was born in Saint-Malo, into the Magon family, wealthy Breton shipbuilders. In 1978, he earned his MBA from HEC Paris. He moved to New York City in 1982.

== Career ==
In New York, Villehuchet was head of Interfinance, a brokerage firm, before becoming chairman and CEO of Crédit Lyonnais Securities USA in 1987. He also contributed to the founding of Apollo Management, financial management firm established by financier Leon Black.

Later, he founded Access International Advisors, a research analyst investment agency that specialized in managing hedged and structured investment portfolios that involve commercial physical and biological research. It had connections to wealthy and powerful aristocrats from Europe. Villehuchet's family had done business with many of these aristocrats and their ancestors for almost 300 years.

Funds managed by Villehuchet enlisted intermediaries with links to some of Europe's high society to garner clients. The FBI and U.S. Securities and Exchange Commission (SEC) do not believe Villehuchet was involved personally in the US$50 billion fraudulent financial Ponzi scheme which Madoff was arrested for masterminding, on 11 December 2008. Bloomberg News reported on 2 January 2009 that the AIA funds had increased aggregate exposure to Madoff from 30% to 75% of a total US$3 billion assets in 2008, for a US$2.25 billion exposure. Investigators also identified a number of prominent investors who gave money to Villehuchet that was tied to the Madoff scandal: Philippe Junot, former husband of Princess Caroline of Monaco, and Prince Michael of Yugoslavia, as partner and investor-relations executive, respectively, in the firm; and Liliane Bettencourt, the world's wealthiest woman at the time (d. 2017), the 86-year-old daughter of L'Oréal founder Eugène Schueller.

According to The New York Times, Villehuchet's older brother Bertrand said his brother was connected to Madoff by Thierry's partner in AIA, Patrick Littaye, another French banker, and that Thierry had not known Madoff personally. "He had a true concept of capitalism", Bertrand Magon de la Villehuchet, 74, said of his brother, quoted in the Times. "He felt responsible and he felt guilty. Today, in the financial world, there is no responsibility; no one wants to shoulder the blame."

Bloomberg reported Bertrand had invested 20% of his assets in an AIA/Madoff fund and also reported René-Thierry had founded Access in 1994 with Littaye. The two had met at Paribas in 1970. In February 2009, Littaye denied having heard of whistleblower Harry Markopolos' accusations against Madoff in the years before the scandal broke, and said Madoff was "of course" exempted from the usual handwriting analysis (graphology) which was among the due diligence efforts AIA made with its outside fund managers. In his book, No One Would Listen, Markopolos recalled that he developed an alternative product to Madoff for his then-employer, Rampart Investment Management. In 2002, while touring Europe alongside de la Villehuchet to recruit potential investors, Markopolos recalled hearing managers from 14 separate funds claim that Madoff's investment advisory arm was "closed," but that their fund was the only source of new money for Madoff—a classic "robbing Peter to pay Paul" scenario.

== Personal life ==
Thierry de la Villehuchet resided in New Rochelle, New York. He was also a member of New York Yacht Club, the Larchmont Yacht Club, where he competed in racing Star and Shields sailboat classes, and the St. Malo Bay Nautical Club in France.

Over the last two decades of his life, Villehuchet was renovating and organizing the archives of Le Château de Plouër in Plouër-sur-Rance, Brittany, which he inherited from an uncle.

== Death ==
On 23 December 2008, Villehuchet was found dead in his company office on Madison Avenue in New York City—the first casualty of the Madoff investment scandal. He was 65.

The AIA Group had lost $1.5 billion, including Villehuchet and Littaye's personal fortunes. Villehuchet had been warned months earlier that Madoff might be engaging in fraud, but dismissed the warning. After Madoff's Ponzi scheme imploded, he held some hope that he would be able to recover a portion of his money, but by 18 December, a week after Madoff's arrest, he realized that he and AIA were finished. He had no means to pay his employees, and there were rumours of criminal charges in Europe. A friend told him, "Your professional life is over." When it became apparent that the money was irretrievably lost, he chose to take his own life.

It was determined that Villehuchet died by suicide on the night of 22 December. He locked himself in his office, took sleeping pills, and slit his left wrist and biceps. According to reports, his arm was placed over a garbage pail, to avoid leaving a mess. Although no suicide note was found at the scene, his brother in France received a note shortly after his death in which he expressed remorse and a feeling of responsibility.
