= Harry Markopolos =

American accountant and Madoff scandal investigator (born 1956)

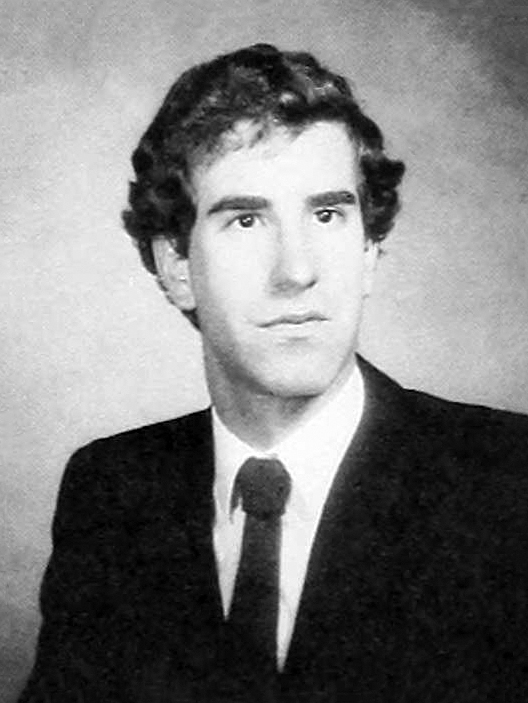
- College yearbook portrait, 1981
- Born: October 22, 1956 (age 70); Erie, Pennsylvania, U.S
- Education: Loyola College in Maryland (BA); Boston College (MS)
- Occupations: Financial fraud investigator, Retired securities executive, CFA, CFE
- Known for: Whistleblower in Bernie Madoff securities fraud scandal
- Spouse: Faith Markopolos
- Children: 3

Harry M. Markopolos (born October 22, 1956) is a Greek American forensic accounting and financial fraud investigator and former securities industry executive best known for initially discovering Bernie Madoff's Ponzi scheme in the late 1990s.

From 1999 to 2008, Markopolos uncovered evidence that suggested that Madoff's wealth management business was a fraudulent Ponzi scheme. In 2000, 2001, and 2005, Markopolos alerted the U.S. Securities and Exchange Commission (SEC) of his views, supplying supporting documents, but each time the SEC ignored him or gave his evidence only a cursory investigation. Madoff was finally revealed to be a fraud in December 2008, when his sons contacted the Federal Bureau of Investigation. After admitting to operating the largest private Ponzi scheme in history, Madoff was sentenced in 2009 to 150 years in prison.

In 2010, Markopolos's book on uncovering the Madoff fraud, No One Would Listen: A True Financial Thriller, was published. Markopolos has criticized the SEC for failing to discover the Madoff fraud despite repeated tips, and for failing to investigate properly the larger companies it supervised.

== Education and career ==
Markopolos attended Roman Catholic schools, graduating from Cathedral Preparatory School in Erie, Pennsylvania, in 1974. He received an undergraduate degree in business administration from Loyola College in Maryland in 1981, and a Master of Science in Finance from Boston College in 1997. He is a CFA charterholder, and a Certified Fraud Examiner (CFE).

He began his career on Wall Street in 1987 as a broker with Makefield Securities, a small Erie-based brokerage owned by Barry C. Hixon. In 1988, he obtained a job with Darien Capital Management in Darien, Connecticut, as an assistant portfolio manager.

From 1991 to 2004, he served as a portfolio manager at Boston-based options trading company Rampart Investment Management, ultimately becoming its chief investment officer.

He now works as a forensic accounting analyst for attorneys who sue companies under the False Claims Act and other laws, emphasizing tips that result in continuing investigations into medical billing, Internal Revenue Service, and United States Department of Defense frauds, in which a "whistleblower" would be compensated.

== Madoff investigation ==
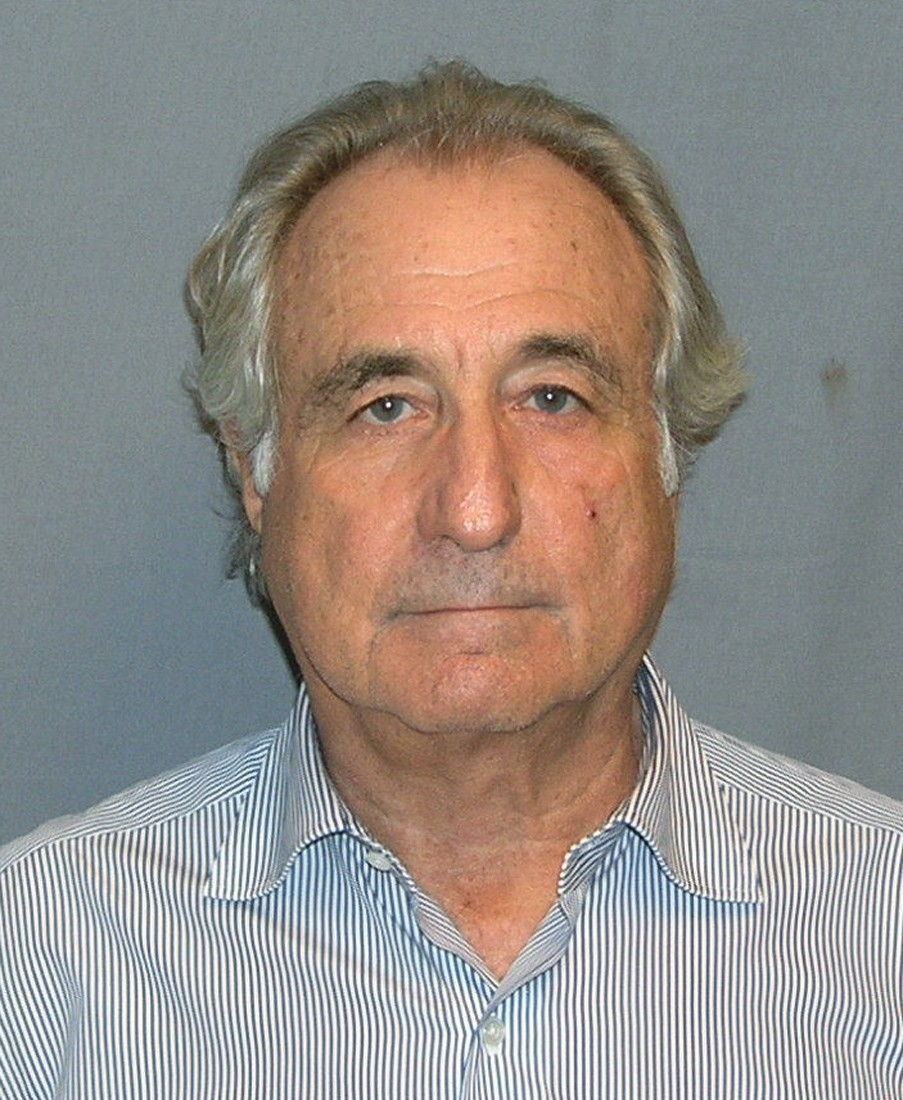
Bernard "Bernie" Madoff

During 1999, Markopolos learned that one of Rampart's frequent trading partners, Access International Advisors, was dealing with a hedge fund manager who consistently delivered net returns of 1% to 2% a month.

Frank Casey, one of Rampart's principals, met with Access CEO René-Thierry Magon de La Villehuchet, and learned the manager was Bernie Madoff, who was operating a wealth management business in which his clients essentially gave him carte blanche to invest the money as he saw fit, in a set of securities. Casey and Rampart's managing partner, Dave Fraley, asked Markopolos to try to design a product similar to Madoff's split-strike conversion, in hopes of luring away Access from investing in Madoff.

When Markopolos obtained a copy of Madoff's revenue stream, he spotted problems. The biggest red flag, he believed, was that the return stream rose steadily with only a few downticks – represented graphically by a nearly perfect 45-degree angle. According to Markopolos, anyone who understood the underlying math of the markets would have known that such a return stream "simply doesn't exist in finance", since the markets were too volatile even in the most favorable conditions for this to be possible. Based on this and other factors, Markopolos eventually concluded that Madoff could not mathematically deliver his purported returns using the strategies he claimed to use. As he saw it, there were only two ways to explain the figures: Madoff was either running a Ponzi scheme (by paying established clients with newer clients' money) or front running (buying stock for his own and the hedge fund's accounts, based on insider knowledge about market impacts from about-to-be-executed client orders at his company's unrelated broker-dealer business).

Markopolos later said that he knew within five minutes that Madoff's numbers didn't add up. He claimed it took him another four hours to uncover enough evidence that he could mathematically prove that they could have been obtained only by fraud.

Despite this, Markopolos's bosses at Rampart asked Markopolos to deconstruct Madoff's strategy to see if he could replicate it. He could not simulate Madoff's returns, using information he had gathered about Madoff's trades in stocks and options. For instance, he discovered that for Madoff's strategy to work, he would have had to buy more options on the Chicago Board Options Exchange than actually existed.

His calculations of Madoff's trades revealed that there was almost no correlation between Madoff's stocks and the S&P 100, as Madoff claimed. Markopolos also could find no evidence that the market was responding to any Madoff trades, even though by his estimate Madoff was managing as much as $6 billion, three times more than any known hedge fund at the time. Given that Madoff's supposed trades should have had a substantial ripple effect on broader markets, Markopolos suspected that Madoff was not even trading.

With the help of two of his colleagues at Rampart, Casey and fellow quant Neil Chelo, Markopolos continued to probe the Madoff operation. What they found concerned him enough that he filed a formal complaint with the Boston office of the SEC during the spring of 2000. However, the SEC took no action. Nonetheless, others in the investing world took Markopolos's findings seriously. In 2000, Joel Tillinghast of Fidelity Investments dropped his plans to study Madoff's strategies after a meeting with Markopolos. Tillinghast wrote years later that his discussion with Markopolos convinced him that Madoff was almost certainly engaging in fraud; as he put it, "nothing in Madoff's ostensible strategy made sense."

Michael Ocrant, editor-in-chief of MARHedge, joined the effort to publicize Madoff's questionable actions. Casey surprised Ocrant with information that Madoff, whom Ocrant only knew to be one of the largest market makers on NASDAQ and one of the largest brokers on the New York Stock Exchange, actually ran a secretive multi-billion dollar hedge fund, directly managing investors' money. Ocrant investigated and wrote an article, "Madoff tops charts; skeptics ask how", published May 1, 2001, questioning Madoff's returns. Within a week, Erin Arvedlund followed with an investigative article in Barron's, further questioning Madoff's secrecy and results; despite the details in these scathing articles, they generated no action from the SEC, and did not scare off Madoff's existing investors.

Markopolos sent a more detailed submission to the SEC a year later. He also offered to let the SEC send him to Madoff's headquarters undercover, obtain the trading tickets, and compare them with the Options Price Reporting Authority tape. By then, Markopolos was convinced that Madoff was not really trading. He believed that his trading tickets would not match the OPRA tape, which would have been hard proof that Madoff was a fraud. This submission also passed without action from the SEC.

From the beginning, Markopolos believed that Madoff was most likely running a Ponzi scheme, given his voracious appetite for cash; a Ponzi scheme can last only as long as new money is flowing in to pay existing investors. His colleagues, Casey and Chelo, were more inclined to think that Madoff was front running. Casey and Chelo believed Madoff was already a very wealthy man, and on paper it made no sense for him essentially to steal billions of dollars that he didn't need. They suspected that it was more feasible for him to increase his returns on actual trades via front running. Markopolos was willing to accept that possibility, but thought it was unlikely since front-runners don't need the massive amount of new investor money that Madoff kept bringing in. Additionally, Markopolos believed that if Madoff was front running, he would have to siphon off money from his broker-dealer arm to pay the investors in his hedge fund. This would have resulted in the customers of his broker-dealer operation getting shortchanged — something that would not have gone unnoticed by Madoff's more sophisticated broker-dealer customers.

Soon after his second submission, Markopolos traveled to Europe with Magon de La Villehuchet to help get investors for an alternative product to Madoff that he'd developed for Rampart. While in Europe, Markopolos found that 14 different funds, at various firms, were invested with Madoff. Each manager believed that his fund was the only one from which Madoff was taking new money, a classic "robbing Peter to pay Paul" scenario. When Markopolos heard this, he was convinced that Madoff's wealth-management business was a Ponzi scheme. He warned Magon de la Villehuchet, but Magon de la Villehuchet refused to disengage from Madoff. Magon de La Villehuchet committed suicide soon after Madoff's scheme collapsed, having lost $1.5 billion of his own and clients' money.

Markopolos persevered, even though he felt that it created a considerable risk to his own safety. He learned during his European tour that a large number of funds invested with Madoff operated offshore. To his mind, this was evidence that the Russian mafia and Latin-American drug cartels were invested with Madoff, and might want to silence anyone who threatened the viability of the hedge funds.

On December 17, 2002, Markopolos came up with a plan to deliver an investigative file anonymously to an aide of then Attorney General of New York Eliot Spitzer as Spitzer delivered a speech at the John F. Kennedy Library in Boston. He put on a pair of white gloves to prevent leaving fingerprints, and wore an oversize coat.

Even after leaving Rampart in 2004, frustrated that he was in a business that had to compete with cheats and lawbreakers, Markopolos continued to be driven by the intellectual challenge of solving the problem, and the ongoing encouragement from Boston SEC staffer Ed Manion. The culmination of Markopolos's analysis was a 21-page memo sent during November 2005 to SEC regulators, entitled "The World's Largest Hedge Fund is a Fraud". It outlined his suspicions in more detail and invited officials to check his theories. He outlined 30 red flags that he believed proved Madoff's returns could not be legitimate. His analysis was based on more than 14 years of Madoff return numbers, during which time Madoff reported only four losing months, an implausible scenario that Markopolos said could be achieved only by fraud. In the document Markopolos states:

Bernie Madoff is running the world's largest unregistered hedge fund. He's organized this business as [a] hedge fund of funds privately labeling their own hedge funds, which Bernie Madoff secretly runs for them using a split-strike conversion strategy, getting paid only trading commissions, which are not disclosed.

Although Madoff's scheme did not collapse until 2008, Markopolos believed that Madoff was on the brink of insolvency as early as the summer of 2005, when Casey found out that at least two banks were no longer lending money to their clients to invest with Madoff. This prompted Madoff to seek loans from banks. In June 2008 – six months before Madoff's scheme imploded – Markopolos's team uncovered evidence that Madoff was accepting leveraged money. In his book, Markopolos wrote that this was a sign Madoff was running out of cash and needed to increase his intake of new funds to keep the scheme going.

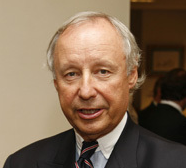
Thierry Magon de La Villehuchet committed suicide three days before Christmas in 2008, shortly after Madoff was arrested by the FBI

On June 3, 2009, Markopolos told a conference at Boston College, his alma mater, that he believed Madoff personally kept less than 1 percent of the $65 billion reported stolen, and would probably lose what remained of his portion to money launderers. Markopolos estimated that $35 billion to $55 billion of the money Madoff claimed to have stolen never really existed, but were simply fictional profits he reported to his clients. Markopolos believed that Madoff's customers lost $10 billion to $35 billion, most of which went to early investors. "Madoff will wind up in a special prison designed as much to keep the crook's victims out as Madoff in. He's a guy who can't afford not to be in prison," he said.

=== Congressional testimony ===
On February 4, 2009, Markopolos testified before the United States Congress' House Financial Services Committee's capital markets panel and on March 1, appeared on CBS's 60 Minutes.

Markopolos harshly criticized the SEC for ignoring his warnings about Madoff. "Nothing was done. There was an abject failure by the regulatory agencies we entrust as our watchdog," he said in 65 pages of prepared testimony. He said that his original 2000 complaint gave the SEC enough evidence to stop Madoff when he was supposedly managing as little as $3 billion.

Describing Madoff as "one of the most powerful men on Wall Street", Markopolos stated that there was "great danger" in investigating him: "My team and I surmised that if Mr. Madoff gained knowledge of our activities, he may feel threatened enough to seek to stifle us." He testified that he feared for his, as well as his family's safety, until after Madoff's arrest, when the SEC finally acknowledged that it had received "credible evidence" of Madoff's Ponzi scheme years before. He said that Madoff's "math never made sense", that his "return stream never resembled any known financial instrument or strategy", and that Madoff wasn't making the volumes of trades he claimed. According to Markopolos, the best warning about Madoff came during his initial analysis of 87 months (a little more than seven years) of Madoff trades. During that time, Madoff reported only three losing months. By comparison, the S&P 500 Index reported 28 losing months during the same period. He likened Madoff's purported returns to a baseball player batting .966 for the season and "no one suspecting a cheat".

Markopolos had originally concealed his identity from SEC regulators during May 1999, although he did meet face-to-face with SEC officials in Boston during 2000 and 2001. After the SEC did not respond, Markopolos was fearful of taking his complaints to the industry's self-regulatory authority, the National Association of Securities Dealers (since succeeded by the Financial Industry Regulatory Authority (FINRA)).

He not only feared the power of Madoff's brother, Peter, had in that organization (he is a former Vice Chairman), but also feared that Madoff might have had associations with Russian and South American organized crime. Markopolos believed the FBI would reject his allegations without the SEC staff's endorsement. He believed that only a few SEC officials, including Manion and SEC Boston branch chief Mike Garrity, understood Madoff's operation well enough to detect the fraud. Markopolos met with Garrity during 2005, and said that while Garrity realized almost immediately that Madoff was violating the law, he could not take any action because Madoff was not based in New England.

Markopolos later wrote that a few days after that meeting, Garrity called him and said his preliminary investigation revealed serious irregularities in the Madoff operation, and that he would have had inspection teams "tearing the place apart" if Madoff had been based in New England. However, since the Boston office's jurisdiction extended only as far as Greenwich, Connecticut; Garrity had no choice but to pass it down to the New York office. "My experiences with other SEC officials proved to be a systemic disappointment and led me to conclude that the SEC securities lawyers, if only through their investigative ineptitude and financial illiteracy, colluded to maintain large frauds such as the one to which Madoff later confessed."

He also added that during 2005 it was Meaghan Cheung, the branch chief of the SEC's New York office, to whom he gave his 21-page report alleging that Madoff was paying old investors with money from fresh recruits. "Ms. Cheung never expressed even the slightest interest in asking me questions", Markopolos said, claiming she was too concerned with Markopolos mentioning the possibility of a reward and the fact that he was a competitor of Madoff. Cheung approved an internal memo during November 2007 to close an SEC investigation of Madoff without bringing any claim. Subsequently, she left the agency. He testified he gave details about the case during 2005 to John Wilke, an investigative reporter for The Wall Street Journal, but that it was never pursued. Markopolos testified he (anonymously) sent a package of documents concerning Madoff to former New York Attorney General Eliot Spitzer, who had successfully prosecuted a number of securities fraud cases, but that Spitzer apparently did not act, either. Spitzer's family firm had invested in Madoff's business.

"Government has coddled, accepted, and ignored white-collar crime for too long," he testified. "It is time the nation woke up and realized that it's not the armed robbers or drug dealers who cause the most economic harm, it's the white collar criminals living in the most expensive homes who have the most impressive resumes who harm us the most. They steal our pensions, bankrupt our companies, and destroy thousands of jobs, ruining countless lives." He testified to Rep. Gary Ackerman (D-NY) that he had never been compensated for his efforts. "I did it for our flag, for patriotism." Markopolos presented recommendations to improve the SEC's operations, which included mandatory department standards: good ethics, full transparency, full disclosure, and fair dealing for all. The SEC must establish a unit to accept "whistleblower" tips, and move its activity closer to financial centers away from Washington, D.C.

His testimony included a reference to another $1 billion Ponzi scheme, which he shared the next day with SEC Inspector General H. David Kotz, who gave the tips to SEC Chairman Mary Schapiro. He disclosed information regarding a dozen as-yet-unknown foreign Madoff feeder funds, "hiding in the weeds" in Europe, the victims of which likely included Russian mafia and drug cartels, "dirty money" investors. Markopolos remarked that European royal families had also lost assets.

Because of concerns of improper conduct by Inspector General Kotz in the Madoff investigation, Inspector General David C. Williams of the United States Postal Service was brought in to conduct an independent outside review. The Williams Report questioned Kotz's work on the Madoff investigation, because Kotz was a "very good friend" with Markopolos. Investigators were not able to determine when Kotz and Markopolos became friends. A violation of the ethics rule would have taken place if the friendship had been concurrent with Kotz's investigation of Madoff.

=== Other statements ===
In his interview with Steve Kroft of 60 Minutes, Markopolos said the biggest warning he noticed during his initial 1999 analysis of Madoff was that he reported losing months only four percent of the time. To Markopolos's mind, no one could possibly be that good, given the volatility of the markets. "As we know, markets go up and down, and his only went up," he said. Markopolos noted that during his tenure at Rampart, he traded with some of the biggest derivatives companies in the world, and none of them dealt with Madoff, because they didn't think his numbers were real. He admitted that he had some financial incentive to eliminate Madoff, as the two competed against each other from 2000 to 2004. However, he said, he felt compelled to pursue it, because "when someone's competing on your playing field, who's a dirty player, you want him tossed off the field." He assailed the SEC once again for ignoring his warnings, saying that the only reason Madoff was caught was that he ultimately collapsed under the weight of his own lies.

Markopolos expanded on his criticism of the SEC in No One Would Listen. He claimed that SEC regulators don't have nearly enough expertise to understand the various products offered in the modern market; as he put it, the SEC was still "panning by hand". He also believed that the SEC's enforcement staff didn't take his complaints seriously, because they were expecting legal proof Madoff was a fraud, not the mathematical evidence he provided. To his mind, the investigators didn't understand that mathematical proof was stronger evidence than legal proof, because "with a math problem, there is only one correct answer."

As a result of the Madoff scandal, the SEC's chairman Christopher Cox stated that an investigation will delve into "all staff contact and relationships with the Madoff family and firm, and their impact, if any, on decisions by staff regarding the firm".

== General Electric fraud allegation ==
In 2019, Markopolos published a report alleging fraudulent accounting within General Electric. The report caused the company's stock to drop 10.3% on August 15, 2019. The stock closed at $9.03 prior to the report, and then closed at $8.01 the following day when the report was published. Markopolos claimed GE was a fraud "bigger than Enron". Subsequently, GE called the report "meritless" and an attempt at "market manipulation" by Markopolos; Wall Street analysts shrugged off the report; and the regulators called the report "fairly simplistic". A Financial Times article labeled the report "some ill-thought out twaddle disguised as deep financial analysis". The Markopolos website (www.gefraud.com) alleging this giant fraud disappeared after criticism about the quality of his analyses. The full report is still available, however, in internet archives. Three months after the 175 page Markopolos report, GE stock had risen almost 44% to close at $11.52 on November 15, outperforming the general stock market.

According to Bloomberg in November 2021, "For GE, the never-ending storm may pass, but at the moment, its future looks cloudy." However, according to Bloomberg in April 2024, "GE's insurance liability [the focus of the Markopolos report] 'doesn't really matter.'"

== Bridgewater Associates ==
Markopolos investigated the hedge fund, Bridgewater Associates, LP.

== Personal life ==
Markopolos is an American of Greek descent and is the eldest of three children of Georgia and Louis Markopolos, Greek-American restaurateurs.

His father and two uncles once owned 12 Arthur Treacher's Fish and Chips restaurants in Maryland and Delaware. His younger brother, Louie, once managed the trading office for a New Jersey brokerage company. He has a sister, Melissa.

He and his wife Faith, who works in the financial industry for an investment company conducting due diligence of portfolio managers, have three sons, two of whom – Harry "Hare Bear" Markopolos and Louis "Big Lou" Markopolos – are twins. Louis is following in his father's footsteps to become a forensic accountant. He is currently attending Bentley University as an accounting major. Harry served in the United States Army Reserve and obtained the rank of Major and held the branch of Civil Affairs.

== Bibliography ==
Markopolos's account of the Madoff scandal was published in a book titled No One Would Listen: A True Financial Thriller. The book was released in 2010.

== Filmography ==
Chasing Madoff, a documentary film based on the book, was released in 2011.
