= Herreshoff H-26 =

Sailboat class

Development
- Designer: Gordon Goodwin, Sidney and Halsey Chase Herreshoff
- Location: United States
- Builder: Cape Cod Shipbuilding
- Name: Herreshoff H-26

Boat
- Displacement: 6,500 lb (2,948 kg)
- Draft: 3.92 ft (1.19 m)

Hull
- Type: Monohull
- Construction: Fiberglass
- LOA: 26.3 ft (8.0 m)
- LWL: 22.25 ft (6.78 m)
- Beam: 9.0 ft (2.7 m)
- Engine: 12 hp (9 kW) diesel engine

Hull appendages
- Keel: long keel
- Ballast: 3,000 lb (1,361 kg)
- Rudder: keel-mounted rudder

Rig
- Rig type: Bermuda rig

Sails
- Sailplan: Masthead sloop
- Total sail area: 360 sq ft (33 m^{2})

The Herreshoff H-26 is an American sailboat that was designed by Gordon Goodwin, Sidney Herreshoff and Halsey Chase Herreshoff as a cruiser.

The H-26 is a cruising development of the 1914 Herreshoff H-12 1/2 and is an enlarged version of the 1959 Goldeneye, both Nathaniel G. Herreshoff designs.

== Production ==
The design was built by Cape Cod Shipbuilding in the United States, but it is now out of production. The company indicates that it still has the molds and would consider putting the design back into production, if a sufficient number were ordered.

== Design ==
The Herreshoff H-26 is a recreational keelboat, built predominantly of fiberglass, with teak wood trim. It has a masthead sloop rig with aluminum spars, a spooned plumb stem, a raised transom, a keel-mounted rudder controlled by either a wheel or a tiller and a fixed long keel. It displaces 6,500 lb (2,948 kg) and carries 3,000 or 2,000 lb (1,361 or 907 kg) of lead ballast.

The boat has a draft of 3.92 ft (1.19 m) with the standard long keel fitted.

The boat is fitted with a diesel engine of 12 hp (9 kW). The fuel tank holds 12 U.S. gallons (45 L; 10.0 imp gal) and the fresh water tank has a capacity of 47 U.S. gallons (180 L; 39 imp gal). There is also a 25 U.S. gallons (95 L; 21 imp gal) holding tank.

The boat's galley is located on both sides of the cabin and includes a two-burner alcohol stove. The head is a marine toilet located forward, just aft of the bow "V"-berth. Additional sleeping space is provided by the dinette settee, for a total sleeping accommodation for four people. The dinette has an optional folding table. Ventilation is provided by a forward hatch, while the eight cabin ports are fixed.

The boat has a large cockpit with two genoa winches and two winches for the halyards. It is fitted with jiffy reefing. Optional equipment includes jib roller furling, self tailing winches, a stern-mounted ladder and shore power connections.

== See also ==
- List of sailing boat types
