= Buzzards Bay 14 =

Sailboat class

Development
- Designer: L. Francis Herreshoff
- Location: United States
- Year: 1940
- Name: Buzzards Bay 14

Boat
- Displacement: 1,700 lb (771 kg)
- Draft: 2.50 ft (0.76 m)

Hull
- Type: Monohull
- Construction: Wood
- LOA: 17.25 ft (5.26 m)
- LWL: 14.00 ft (4.27 m)
- Beam: 5.83 ft (1.78 m)

Hull appendages
- Keel: long keel
- Ballast: 800 lb (363 kg)
- Rudder: keel-mounted rudder

Rig
- Rig type: Marconi rig

Sails
- Sailplan: Fractional rigged sloop
- Mainsail area: 103 sq ft (9.6 m^{2})
- Jib/genoa area: 35 sq ft (3.3 m^{2})
- Spinnaker area: 140 sq ft (13 m^{2})
- Total sail area: 138 sq ft (12.8 m^{2})

The Buzzards Bay 14 is an American sailboat that was designed by L. Francis Herreshoff and first built in 1940.

The Buzzards Bay 14 is a scaled-up development of the Herreshoff 12½, which was designed by L. Francis Herreshoff's father, Nathanael Greene Herreshoff.

== Production ==
The design was commissioned by Llewllyn Howland and was intended to be built by the Concordia Company in the United States out of wood, but few were completed as the company concentrated on the Beetle Cat instead. In the mid-1980s production was commenced in fiberglass, with 17 boats completed by 1994.

Today the design is built in fiberglass by the Buzzards Bay Boat Shop of North Falmouth, Massachusetts and from wood by Artisan Boatworks in Rockport, Maine.

== Design ==
The Buzzards Bay 14 is an open recreational keelboat with a foredeck. It has been built of wood or, more recently, of fiberglass, with wood trim. It has a fractional rig with wooden or aluminum spars. The hull has a spooned raked stem, an angled transom, a keel-mounted rudder controlled by a tiller and a fixed long keel, with a slightly cutaway forefoot. The wooden version displaces 1,700 lb (771 kg) and carries 800 lb (363 kg) of encapsulated lead ballast, while the fiberglass version displaces 2,000 lb (907 kg).

The boat has a draft of 2.50 ft (0.76 m) with the standard keel.

For sailing the design has a boom-mounted jib and may be equipped with a spinnaker of 140 sq ft (13 m^{2}).

== Operational history ==
In a 1994 review Richard Sherwood wrote about the fiberglass version, "there is a wood “feel” to the boat, as all seats, seat backs and other trim are teak, and fittings are either wood or bronze. Wood spars are an option to the standard painted aluminum. Sails include the main, with one set of reef points. The jib is club-footed, and optional sails are available. There are two locking compartments, and storage under hinged seats is available as an option."

== See also ==
- List of sailing boat types

Related development

- Herreshoff 12½

Similar sailboats

- Holder 17
- Siren 17
- Vagabond 17
