= Marlin 23 =

Sailboat class

Development
- Designer: Nathanael Greene Herreshoff and A. Sidney DeWolf Herreshoff
- Location: United States
- Year: 1958
- No. built: 160
- Builders: Herreshoff Manufacturing; Cape Cod Shipbuilding
- Name: Marlin 23

Boat
- Displacement: 3,000 lb (1,361 kg)
- Draft: 3.25 ft (0.99 m)

Hull
- Type: monohull
- Construction: fiberglass
- LOA: 23.00 ft (7.01 m)
- LWL: 16.92 ft (5.16 m)
- Beam: 7.18 ft (2.19 m)
- Engine: Yanmar 2YM15 diesel engine

Hull appendages
- Keel: long keel
- Ballast: 1,400 lb (635 kg)
- Rudder: keel-mounted rudder

Rig
- Rig type: Bermuda rig
- I foretriangle height: 28.00 ft (8.53 m)
- J foretriangle base: 8.50 ft (2.59 m)
- P mainsail luff: 25.40 ft (7.74 m)
- E mainsail foot: 11.00 ft (3.35 m)

Sails
- Sailplan: masthead sloop
- Mainsail area: 139.70 sq ft (12.979 m^{2})
- Jib/genoa area: 119.00 sq ft (11.055 m^{2})
- Total sail area: 258.70 sq ft (24.034 m^{2})

Racing
- PHRF: 264

The Marlin 23, also called the Marlin Heritage, is an American trailerable sailboat that was designed by Nathanael Greene Herreshoff and A. Sidney DeWolf Herreshoff, first built in 1958.

The boat design is a development of the 1920s Nathanael Greene Herreshoff design, the Herreshoff Fish, with a new cabin and rig design, drawn by Nathaniel's son, A. Sidney DeWolf Herreshoff. The Fish was itself an enlarged version of the 1914 Nathanael Greene Herreshoff-designed Herreshoff 12½.

== Production ==
The design was originally built of wood by Herreshoff Manufacturing. It was later built of fiberglass by Cape Cod Shipbuilding in the United States and was one of the earliest fiberglass boats produced, with 160 boats completed. As of 2021 it remains in production as the Marlin Heritage, with an updated features.

== Design ==
A. Sidney DeWolf Herreshoff's changes to the Fish class to create this design included lengthening the stern by 2.25 ft (0.69 m) to allow a permanently mounted backstay and designing the new masthead sloop rig.

The Marlin 23 is a recreational keelboat, built predominantly of fiberglass, with wood trim. It has a spooned, raked stem, a raised counter, angled transom; a keel-mounted rudder controlled by a tiller and a fixed long keel. It displaces 3,000 lb (1,361 kg) or 3,845 lb (1,744 kg) in the Marlin Heritage version and carries 1,400 lb (635 kg) of lead ballast.

The boat has a draft of 3.25 ft (0.99 m) with the standard keel.

The boat may be fitted with a small 6 to 10 hp (4 to 7 kW) outboard motor for docking and maneuvering or an optional inboard Japanese Yanmar 2YM15 diesel engine.

The design has sleeping accommodation for two people on two straight settees in the main cabin. The galley is located on the port side just forward of the companionway step, which is a 9 U.S. gallons (34 L; 7.5 imp gal) cooler. There is a dinette table that can be set up in the cabin or the cockpit. The 2.6 U.S. gallons (9.8 L; 2.2 imp gal) portable head is located just forward of the mast. Cabin headroom is 54 in (140 cm).

For sailing the design is equipped with a roller furling jib, with a genoa optional. A boat trailer for ground transport is also optional.

The design has a PHRF racing average handicap of 264 and a hull speed of 5.5 kn (10.2 km/h).

== Operational history ==
In a 2017 Sail magazine review of the Marlin Heritage, Adam Cort wrote, "the Marlin Heritage 23 showed a good turn of speed and then some during a boisterous early spring daysail on Buzzards Bay—making short work of both the chop and a brisk headwind as Cape Cod Shipbuilding president Wendy Goodwin and I short-tacked our way down the Wareham River. The boat did so without giving even the slightest cause for alarm, thanks to her fine, spoon bow and easy forefoot, which both sliced through the waves and kept the crew dry with a minimum of effort; plenty of waterline beam amidships to provide enough form stability to stand up to a press of sail; and a good 1,400lb of lead at the bottom of the boat’s gently curving full keel. The Marlin Heritage’s keel-hung rudder did an equally fine job of keeping a grip on the water sailing to windward, even when we dunked the leeward gunwale in the 18-20 knot gusts—no surprise given the creator of the boat’s lines."

In a review for Maine Boats magazine, Art Paine wrote of the Marlin Heritage, "At first blush I questioned the elongated vee cabin on the Heritage and the incursion it made upon cockpit length. But oh that cabin! This is the nicest, most hospitable cabin I've seen in a while. This boat also has a self-bailing cockpit, a self-tacking jib, and an inboard engine, three sensible features for geriatric sailing. I love this little yacht, which seems to have everything."

== See also ==
- List of sailing boat types
