= International 210 =

Sailboat class

- 210

Development
- Designer: Fenwick Williams under C. Raymond Hunt supervision
- Location: United States
- Year: 1946
- No. built: 460
- Builders: Pearson Yachts; Graves Yacht Yard; Shaw Yacht, Inc.
- Role: One-design racer
- Name: International 210

Boat
- Crew: 3-4
- Displacement: 2,300 lb (1,043 kg)
- Draft: 5.83 ft (1.78 m)

Hull
- Type: monohull
- Construction: fiberglass
- LOA: 29.83 ft (9.09 m)
- LWL: 22.50 ft (6.86 m)
- Beam: 5.83 ft (1.78 m)

Hull appendages
- Keel: swept bulb fin keel
- Ballast: 1,145 lb (519 kg)
- Rudder: skeg-mounted rudder

Rig
- Rig type: Bermuda rig

Sails
- Sailplan: fractional rigged sloop
- Mainsail area: 210 sq ft (20 m^{2})
- Jib/genoa area: 75 sq ft (7.0 m^{2})
- Spinnaker area: 320 sq ft (30 m^{2})
- Total sail area: 285 sq ft (26.5 m^{2})

The International 210 is an American sailboat that was designed by Fenwick Williams under the supervision of C. Raymond Hunt as a one design racer and first built in 1946.

The International 210 is a development of the smaller 1939 International 110. Unlike commonly used sailboat nomenclature, the 210's designation does not refer to its length overall or waterline length, but indicates it is the next in a series of boats that started with the 110.

== Production ==
The design has been built by Pearson Yachts, Graves Yacht Yard and Shaw Yacht, Inc. in the United States. Shaw was the last builder and was still producing boats as recently as 2007. As of 2022 the company was listed as "dissolved". A total of 460 boats have been completed.

== Design ==
The International 210 is a racing keelboat that was originally built from plywood, with a single hard chine. In 1967 the class allowed fiberglass construction and most boats since that have been constructed of foam-cored fiberglass, with teak trim. The design has a fractional sloop masthead sloop rig with wooden spars, with aluminum spars approved for use in 1973. The double-ended canoe hull has a spooned, raked stem; a spooned, raised counter transom, a skeg-mounted rudder controlled by a tiller and a swept, fixed fin bulb keel. It displaces 2,300 lb (1,043 kg) and carries 1,145 lb (519 kg) of iron ballast.

The boat has a draft of 5.83 ft (1.78 m) with the standard keel.

For sailing the design is equipped with internal halyards and outhaul. Sail windows provide improved visibility. Buoyancy is provided by foam blocks, making the design unsinkable.

It is raced by a crew of three to four sailors.

== Operational history ==
In 1946 the sailing clubs of Massachusetts Bay were seeking a new boat for inter-club racing. Their requirements included that it be affordable, a pleasant day sailer, a one design good racer and a modern boat that could be updated to keep it modern. The selection committee found the 210 to be the best design for the cost and it was adopted.

The boat is supported by an active class club that organizes racing events, the International 210 Association. There are racing fleets are on Massachusetts Bay and Chesapeake Bay as well as in Michigan, Wisconsin, Maine and Hawaii.

In a 1994 review Richard Sherwood wrote, "this is the big brother of the 110, by the same designer. The 110, however, has no curve to the bow or stern. The 210 is a fast boat and frequently beats Shields, Stars, and J/24s. It is light, but with the keel, stable, Originally built of plywood, the 210 is now glass-reinforced plastic. There have been continual updates over the 48-year history of the 210, but when the older boats have been maintained, they continue to compete with newer boats."

== See also ==
- List of sailing boat types

Related development

- International 110
