= Cape Cod Shipbuilding =

US sailboat builder

- Company type: Privately held company
- Industry: Boat building
- Founded: 1899
- Founders: Myron and Charles Gurney
- Headquarters: Wareham, Massachusetts, United States
- Key people: President: Gordon L. Goodwin
- Products: Sailboats
- Website: capecodshipbuilding.com

Cape Cod Shipbuilding is an American boat builder based in Wareham, Massachusetts. The company specializes in the manufacture of fiberglass sailboats.

The company was founded by brothers Myron and Charles Gurney in 1899.

== History ==
The company started as a wagon maker in central Wareham, constructing wagons for local businesses. With the invention of the rubber tire they began to branch out into other fields. Their plant was on the Wareham River, which provided access to Buzzards Bay and so they occasionally built skiffs for their own recreational use. A customer offered to buy one skiff that they had built, but rather than sell it, they built him a duplicate, starting them in the boat building business.

A new company was launched in 1899 to build boats, which the brothers named the Cape Cod Power Dory Company. It built wooden sailboats and skiffs. One of their most well-known early designs was the 1925 Cape Cod Knockabout, designed by Charles Gurney.

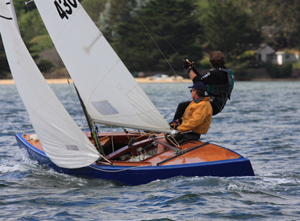
International 110

As the company grew they built lifeboats and an 80-foot (24-meter) launch which displaced 60 tons (54 metric tons), named Saltaire. It was the largest vessel launched to that time and the town residents came out to watch it christened and launched in the Wareham River.

In 1919, the new Narrows Bridge was built over the river below the plant and that restricted access to Buzzards Bay. The company was moved to a new property below the bridge, called Idlewild, which was on land owned by William Minot. The company name was changed at the time of the move to the Cape Cod Shipbuilding Corporation. The new property allowed spreading the buildings constructed out to avoid the risk of fire. Buildings were constructed for wood storage, milling, boat assembly, painting, a showroom and an office with a view over the whole operation. The company built both pleasure boats and commercial boats during this period.

When Charles Gurney died the ownership passed to G.S. Williams and the plant entered a decline in product quality and employment dropped to one employee. The operation was purchased by Les Goodwin in 1939. Goodwin and his wife, Audrey, moved into the office to live, to turn the company around. They enlisted well-known boat designers, including Philip Rhodes and Sparkman & Stephens to produce designs for production, including the Rhodes 18 and Cape Cod Mercury 15.

During the Second World War the company was leased to National Fireworks and was named the Wareham Shipyards to give it better access to strategic materials. It produced small tugboats, launches and smoke boats, all with drafts of under 15 ft (5 m) due to the depth of the river at the plant. The company built 40 ft (12 m) tugboats at a rate of six per month, employing over 100 people.

Goodwin was an engineer and inventor and created a process to make hollow, wooden sailboat masts from four pieces of wood, using water pressure.

Goodwin learned about fiberglass as a new boat construction material during the Second World War and started the company working with it directly after the war, in 1947, starting with models. The company became one of the first boat builders to offer commercial fiberglass boats for sail, converting the Rhodes 18 and Mercury 15 to the new material. The company was also to first to mount a lead keel on a fiberglass boat.

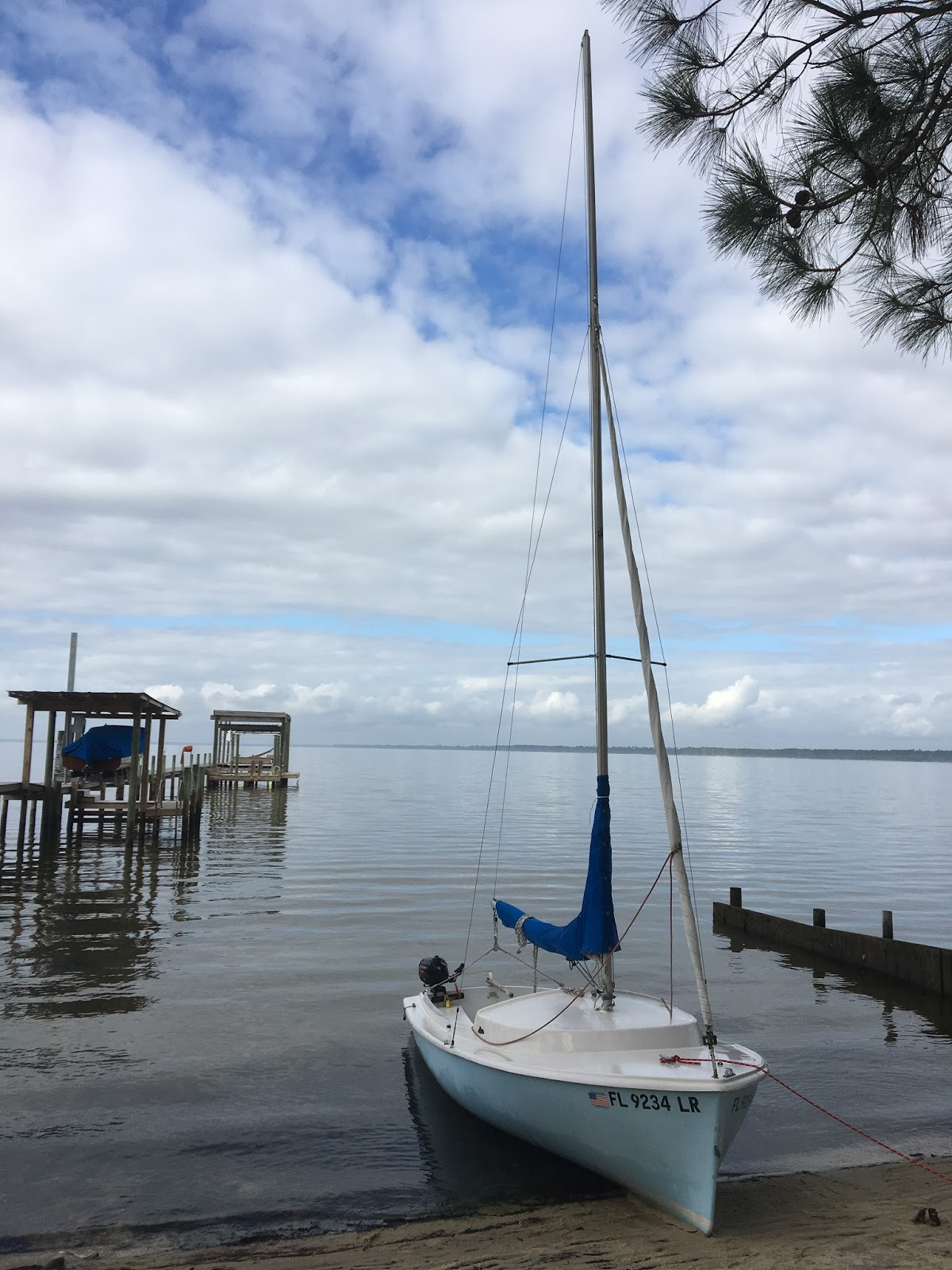
Day Sailer

In 1947 Goodwin also purchased the exclusive rights to all the boat designs of Nathanael Greene Herreshoff. A few were developed for production and the rest sent to the Massachusetts Institute of Technology for cataloguing and preservation. The company built 35 wooden Herreshoff Bull's Eyes to keep the racing fleets using this type supplied with boats.

Goodwin developed new methods of working with fiberglass and new techniques for making one-piece hulls with bonded decks. Many of the new techniques were secret and building was confined to a new, low-ceiling plant that provided a better climate for resin curing, as well as limited access.

Goodwin purchased a company making aluminum masts and booms, Zephyr Spars, from Alcoa and all production was moved to Wareham. Zephyr Spars remains a division of the company and builds spars for other manufacturers, as well.

In 1979, Goodwin's son, Gordon L. Goodwin, became president, in time for the early 1980s recession and the downturn in the sailboat market that followed. He guided the operation into doing boat repairs and storage to keep the company afloat financially. The advent of Hurricane Bob in 1991 actually turned into a boom of boat repair work, as well as new boat orders.

In 1993 Gordon L. Goodwin's daughter, Wendy Goodwin, joined the business.

In 1995 the company was appointed by the class association as the official builder for the Uffa Fox-designed Day Sailer.

In 2022 the company was producing ten designs: the Cape Cod Mercury 15, Herreshoff Bull's Eye, Herreshoff 12½, Day Sailer, Rhodes 18, Herreshoff Goldeneye, Marlin Heritage 23, Raven 25, Atlantic and the Shields.

== Boats ==
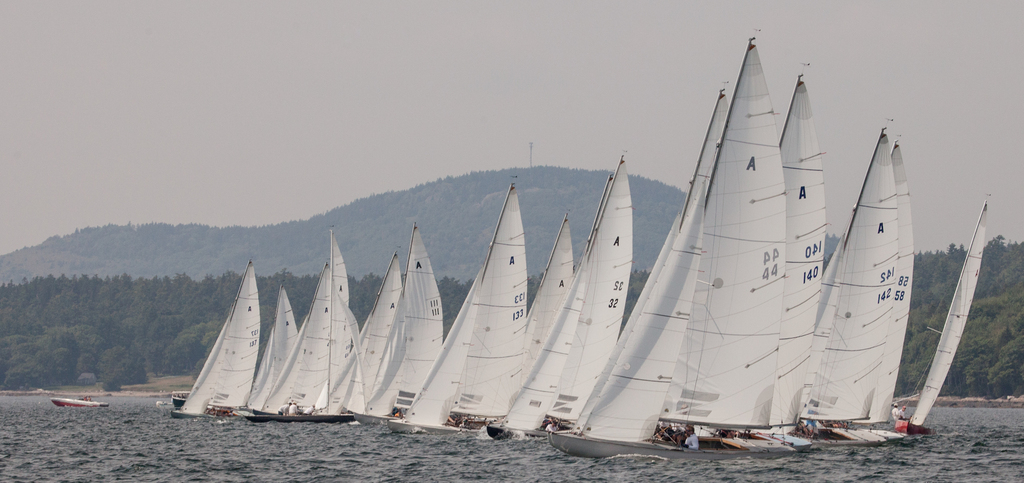
Atlantic start line

Summary of boats built by Cape Cod Shipbuilding:

- Herreshoff 12½ – 1914
- Herreshoff Bull's Eye – 1914
- Cape Cod Knockabout – 1925
- Atlantic (sailboat) – 1929
- International 110 – 1938
- Cape Cod Mercury 15 – 1940
- Rhodes 18 – 1948
- Raven (sailboat) – 1949
- Beverly Dinghy – 1953
- Cape Cod Gemini – 1955
- Marlin 23 – 1958
- Herreshoff Goldeneye – 1959
- Mercer 44 – 1959
- Blue Chip 30 – 1961
- Cape Cod 30 – 1961
- Beverly (catamaran) – 1962
- Shields (keelboat) – 1962
- Cape Cod Cat – 1971
- Hermann Cat – 1971
- Herreshoff H-26
- Day Sailer – 1995

== See also ==
- List of sailboat designers and manufacturers
