= Cape Cod Knockabout =

Class of sailboat

Specifications
| LOA | 18’0” |
| LWL | 15’6” |
| Draft (board up) | 9” |
| Draft (board down) | 4’2” |
| Beam | 6’0” |
| Weight (bare hull) | 650 lb. |
| Main and Jib Sail Area | 187 sq ft (17 m^{2}). |
| Spinnaker Sail Area | 150 sq ft (14 m^{2}). |

A Cape Cod Knockabout, or Knockabout, is a one-design class of 18-foot (5 m) sail boat sailed primarily out of Upper Cape harbors in Massachusetts, United States.

Cape Cod Knockabouts were designed by Charles S. Gurney and were popular in Massachusetts between the 1940s and 1970s, with fleets of 50–60 boats available to take part in annual regattas. Active racing fleets continued to exist into the twenty-first century in Megansett (North Falmouth), Waquoit (East Falmouth), Lewis Bay (Yarmouth), and Woods Hole (Falmouth), and at the Split Rock Yacht Club in Essex, New York, on Lake Champlain. The vessels are also in general use as pleasure craft in southern New England.

The Cape Cod Knockabout Association holds an annual regatta each summer which is held at one of the above four Cape Cod locations on a rotating basis. Around 20 boats attend this regatta each year. Cape Cod Shipbuilding in Wareham manufactures the boat.
