= John Wilke =

American journalist (1954-2009)

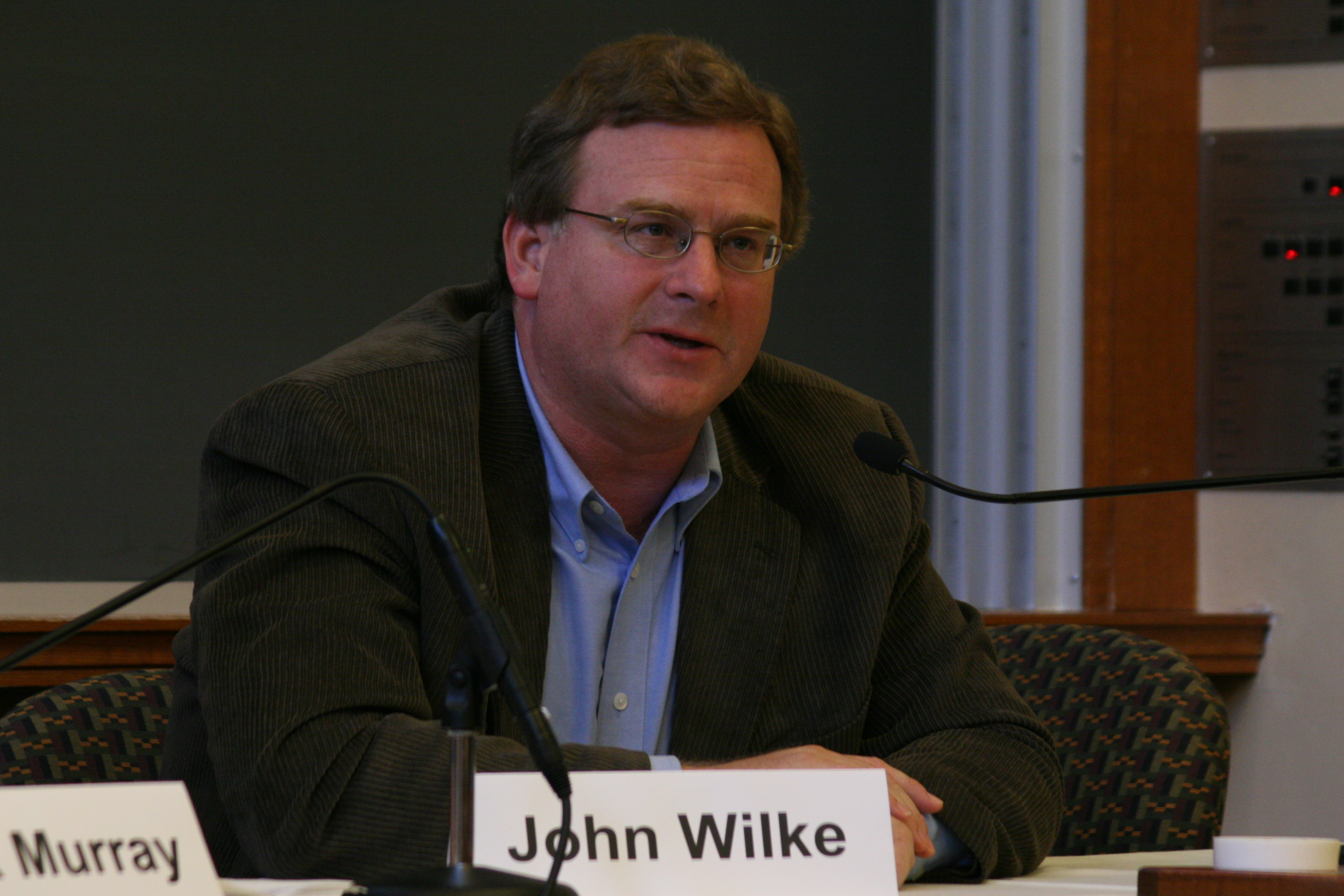
- John Wilke (2008) at the Berkman Center for Internet & Society at Harvard University.
- Born: December 12, 1954; White Plains, New York
- Died: May 1, 2009 (aged 54); Bethesda, Maryland
- Education: New College of Florida
- Alma mater: Columbia University Graduate School of Journalism
- Occupation: Journalist
- Writing career
- Language: English
- Period: 1983 – 2009

John Wilke (December 12, 1954 – May 1, 2009) was an American investigative reporter and news editor in the Washington bureau of The Wall Street Journal for two decades, beginning in 1989 and lasting until his death in 2009.

Wilke was born in White Plains, New York. He earned his bachelor's degree with a double major in psychology and biology from New College in Sarasota, Florida. He earned his M.A. from the Columbia University Graduate School of Journalism.

He began his career in 1983 as an intern at The Washington Post. He joined BusinessWeek as a Washington correspondent in 1984 and became a staff writer for The Boston Globe in 1986.

In July 1989, Wilke joined the Wall Street Journal's Boston bureau, covering technology. He moved to the Washington bureau in May 1995, covering economics and the Federal Reserve Bank until December 1996, when he began covering government technology policy, the Federal Trade Commission and the United States Department of Justice.

In 2006, private fraud investigator Harry Markopolos gave extensive details about the Bernard Madoff Ponzi scheme to Wilke, who showed interest in the story. According to Markopolos, Wilke's editors did not allow him to pursue the story.

He died in 2009 in Bethesda, Maryland.

From his obituary in the Journal: "In recent years, [Wilke] specialized in articles about deals cut by members of Congress to win special appropriations, known as earmarks, for friends, supporters and business associates back home. One of his investigations helped lead to last year's indictment of then-Rep. Rick Renzi (R., Ariz.), who is accused of receiving favors from developers and copper-mining executives in return for congressional help. Another revealed the broad range of earmarks a powerful Democrat, Rep. John Murtha, used to bring federal contracts to his Pennsylvania district."

== Awards ==
- He won a Computer Press Association award with David Bank for his coverage of Microsoft.
- He won the Everett McKinley Dirksen (2007) prize for "distinguished coverage of Congress" for his reporting on congressional earmarks.

== Death ==
Wilke died, aged 54, on May 1, 2009, from pancreatic cancer in Bethesda, Maryland.
