= Herreshoff Bull's Eye =

Sailboat class

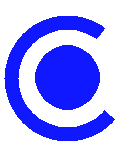
- Class symbol

Development
- Designer: Nathanael Greene Herreshoff
- Location: United States
- Year: 1914
- No. built: 2,000 wood, 800 fiberglass (1994)
- Builders: Herreshoff Manufacturing Company; Quincy Adams Yacht Yard; Cape Cod Shipbuilding
- Name: Herreshoff Bull's Eye

Boat
- Displacement: 1,350 lb (612 kg)
- Draft: 2.42 ft (0.74 m)

Hull
- Type: Monohull
- Construction: wood and later fiberglass
- LOA: 15.71 ft (4.79 m)
- LWL: 12.52 ft (3.82 m)
- Beam: 5.83 ft (1.78 m)

Hull appendages
- Keel: long keel
- Ballast: 750 lb (340 kg)
- Rudder: keel-mounted rudder

Rig
- Rig type: Bermuda rig
- I foretriangle height: 17.00 ft (5.18 m)
- J foretriangle base: 6.00 ft (1.83 m)
- P mainsail luff: 19.25 ft (5.87 m)
- E mainsail foot: 10.83 ft (3.30 m)

Sails
- Sailplan: Fractional rigged sloop
- Mainsail area: 104.24 sq ft (9.684 m^{2})
- Jib/genoa area: 51.00 sq ft (4.738 m^{2})
- Spinnaker area: 100.00 sq ft (9.290 m^{2})
- Total sail area: 155.24 sq ft (14.422 m^{2})

The Herreshoff Bull's Eye or Bullseye, is an American trailerable sailboat that was designed by Nathanael Greene Herreshoff and first built in 1914.

The design is derived from the Herreshoff 12½ and was later developed into the Herreshoff Goldeneye.

== Production ==
The design was originally built out of wood by the Herreshoff Manufacturing Company in the United States. In 1938 the design was given an above-transom tiller and renamed the Fishers Island Sound Bull's Eye. It was also built at the Quincy Adams Yacht Yard, in Quincy, Massachusetts. In 1947 the rights were purchased by Cape Cod Shipbuilding and a new fiberglass version, called the Cape Cod Bull's Eye, was created by the original designer's son, A. Sidney DeWolf Herreshoff. This model includes a cuddy cabin and a modern marconi rig with aluminum spars.

While the deck and rigging has changed over the production run of more than 100 years, the hull design has remained the same.

By 1994, 2,000 wooden boats had been built, plus 800 from fiberglass. The design remains in production.

== Design ==
The Bull's Eye is a recreational keelboat, built predominantly of wood and later of fiberglass, with teak wood trim. It has a fractional sloop rig, a spooned raked stem, a raked transom, a keel-mounted rudder controlled by a tiller and a fixed long keel. It displaces 1,350 lb (612 kg) and carries 750 lb (340 kg) of lead ballast.

The boat has a draft of 2.42 ft (0.74 m) with the standard keel. Buoyancy tanks are installed in the bow and under the cockpit floor for safety. In post 1947 models a cuddy cabin is provided for stowage, in addition to the lazarette, which is accessed via a teak hatch.

For sailing the design is equipped with a self-tending 30 sq ft (2.8 m^{2}) jib, or a 60 sq ft (5.6 m^{2}) genoa and may use a 100.00 sq ft (9.290 m^{2}) spinnaker.

The boat has a factory option of a trailer that may be used for ground transportation.

== Operational history ==
The design is supported by an active class club, the Bullseye Class Association and is raced in Florida, Maine, Massachusetts, New Jersey, as well as on the waters of Long Island Sound.

In a 1994 review Richard Sherwood described the boat as, "a New England classic, designed stiff and heavy for the short, choppy seas of Buzzards Bay."

== See also ==
- List of sailing boat types

Related development

- Herreshoff 12½
