= Beverly (catamaran) =

Beverly was a catamaran sailboat designed by MacLear & Harris, built by Cape Cod Shipbuilding and owned by Van Alan Clark Jr., who won several racing competitions with her in the 1960s.

Her fiberglass hulls were connected by three aluminum tubes, with an aluminum mast and a nylon trampoline for the crew.

Beverly took the North American Catamaran Championship title in the 300-square-foot class on August 19-20, 1962. In the fourth One-of-a-Kind Regatta, sponsored by Yachting magazine, boats of all types competed against each other under a complicated handicap system in the waters of Biscayne Bay, Florida, in February 1963. Catamarans dominated to such an extent - taking the top ten places in all three races - that organizers decided to name only one overall winner, Beverly, which outclassed the other catamarans. However, she was defeated by Sealion in the 1963 North American Catamaran Championship, held off Marion, Massachusetts.

== See also ==
- List of multihulls
