= Chasing Madoff =

2010 documentary film directed by Jeff Prosserman

- Film poster
- Directed by: Jeff Prosserman
- Produced by: Jeff Prosserman; Jeff Sackman; Randy Mains
- Starring: Bernie Madoff; Harry Markopolos
- Music by: David Fluery
- Release date: November 19, 2010
- Running time: 91 min.
- Country: Netherlands
- Language: English

Chasing Madoff is a 2010 documentary film written and directed by Jeff Prosserman. The film is based on the book by Harry Markopolos. It was first released at the International Documentary Film Festival in Amsterdam on 19 November 2010. It was first shown in North America on 26 August 2011.

== Summary ==
The film chronicles how Harry Markopolos and his associates spent ten years trying to get the U.S. Securities and Exchange Commission (SEC) and others to acknowledge and act on their investigative proof of Bernie Madoff's Ponzi scheme, which scammed an estimated $18 billion, or $65 billion including fake returns, from investors. Despite a series of meetings over a number of years, the SEC ignored Markopolos and his associates or only gave the evidence a cursory investigation.

== Interviewees ==
- Harry Markopolos
- Frank Casey
- Neil Chelo
- Michael Ocrant
- Gaytri Kachroo

== Reception ==
On the review aggregator website Rotten Tomatoes, 46% of 41 critics' reviews are positive, with an average rating of 5.8/10. The website's consensus reads: "Chasing Madoff admirably highlights Harry Markopolos' perilous crusade against one of history's biggest frauds, but the documentary's disinterest in Madoff himself makes it feel like only half the story." On Metacritic, the film has a weighted average score of 52 out of 100, based on 17 critics, indicating "mixed or average" reviews. Entertainment Weekly gave the film a B+ rating.
