= Raven (sailboat) =

Sailboat class

Development
- Designer: Roger McAleer
- Location: United States
- Year: 1949
- No. built: 400
- Builders: Sound Marine Construction; Cape Cod Shipbuilding; O'Day Corp. Nevins Inc.
- Name: Raven

Boat
- Crew: three
- Displacement: 1,170 lb (531 kg)
- Draft: 5.33 ft (1.62 m) with centerboard down

Hull
- Type: Monohull
- Construction: Cold molded plywood or fiberglass
- LOA: 24.25 ft (7.39 m)
- LWL: 21.58 ft (6.58 m)
- Beam: 7.00 ft (2.13 m)

Hull appendages
- Keel: centerboard
- Ballast: none
- Rudder: internally-mounted spade-type rudder

Rig
- Rig type: Bermuda rig

Sails
- Sailplan: Fractional rigged sloop
- Total sail area: 300 sq ft (28 m^{2})

Racing
- D-PN: 82.6

The Raven is a sailboat first built in 1949. In the past the design has been built by Sound Marine Construction, the O'Day Corp. and Nevins Inc., all in the United States. Today it is built by Cape Cod Shipbuilding and remains in pr oduction. A total of 400 boats have been built.

When the Raven was first built of fiberglass, starting in 1951, the initial eight production boats were purchased by the United States Coast Guard Academy for cadet training.

The Raven is a recreational sailboat, originally built of cold molded plywood. In 1951 it was converted to be constructed of fiberglass, with teak wood trim, including the cockpit coaming. It has a fractional sloop rig with aluminum spars, including a double-spreader mast, supported by stainless steel standing rigging. The hull has a spooned raked stem, an angled transom, an internally mounted, fiberglass, spade-type rudder controlled by a tiller and a retractable fiberglass centerboard. It displaces 1,170 lb (531 kg) and carries no ballast.

The boat has a draft of 5.33 ft (1.62 m) with the centreboard extended and 7 in (18 cm) with it retracted, allowing beaching or ground transportation on a trailer.

For sailing the design has roller reefing for the mainsail, dual self-bailers and a 6:1 mechanical advantage outhaul. A spinnaker is optional.

Class rule changes instituted in 1970 allowed for a one-piece aluminum centerboard, a trapeze, a full-width mainsheet traveler mounted on the aft deck and hiking straps.

The design has a Portsmouth Yardstick racing average handicap of 82.6 and is normally raced by a crew of three sailors.
