= Holder 17 =

Sailboat class

Development
- Designer: Ron Holder
- Location: United States
- Year: 1982
- Builders: Holder Marine; Hobie Cat
- Role: Day sailer-Cruiser
- Name: Holder 17

Boat
- Displacement: 950 lb (431 kg)
- Draft: 4.17 ft (1.27 m) with keel down

Hull
- Type: Monohull
- Construction: Fiberglass
- LOA: 17.00 ft (5.18 m)
- LWL: 15.00 ft (4.57 m)
- Beam: 7.00 ft (2.13 m)

Hull appendages
- Keel: swing keel
- Ballast: 325 lb (147 kg)
- Rudder: transom-mounted rudder

Rig
- Rig type: Bermuda rig
- I foretriangle height: 18.80 ft (5.73 m)
- J foretriangle base: 6.66 ft (2.03 m)
- P mainsail luff: 20.00 ft (6.10 m)
- E mainsail foot: 7.75 ft (2.36 m)

Sails
- Sailplan: Fractional rigged sloop Masthead sloop
- Mainsail area: 77.50 sq ft (7.200 m^{2})
- Jib/genoa area: 62.60 sq ft (5.816 m^{2})
- Spinnaker area: 140.10 sq ft (13.016 m^{2})
- Total sail area: 140.04 sq ft (13.010 m^{2})

The Holder 17 is an American trailerable sailboat that was designed by Ron Holder as a pocket cruiser and day sailer and first built in 1982.

The boat was developed from the 1976 Vagabond 17 design.

== Production ==
The design was built by Holder Marine and Hobie Cat in the United States, but it is now out of production.

== Design ==
The Holder 17 is a recreational keelboat, built predominantly of fiberglass, with teak wood trim. It has a fractional sloop rig with aluminum spars. The hull has a raked stem, a vertical transom, a transom-hung rudder controlled by a tiller and a locking swing keel. The boat has foam flotation, making it unsinkable. Cabin headroom is 48 in (122 cm).

The boat is normally fitted with a small 2 to 5 hp (1 to 4 kW) outboard motor for docking and maneuvering.

The design has a hull speed of 5.2 kn (9.6 km/h).

== Variants ==
Holder 17
This cabin model was introduced in 1982. It has a length overall of 17.00 ft (5.2 m), a waterline length of 15.00 ft (4.6 m), displaces 950 lb (431 kg) and carries 325 lb (147 kg) of ballast. The boat has a draft of 4.17 ft (1.27 m) with the swing keel down and 1.17 ft (0.36 m) with it retracted.
Holder 17 DS
This day sailing model has only a cuddy cabin for stowage and was introduced in 1982. It has a length overall of 17.00 ft (5.2 m), a waterline length of 15.00 ft (4.6 m), displaces 925 lb (420 kg) and carries 325 lb (147 kg) of ballast. The boat has a draft of 4.17 ft (1.27 m) with the swing keel down and 1.17 ft (0.36 m) with it retracted.

== Operational history ==
In a 2010 review, Steve Henkel wrote, "unlike most of Hobie Cat's boats, the Holder 17 is neither a catamaran nor a product of the fertile mind of Hobie Alter, the multibull firm's namesake. It is instead a 'monomaran' from the drawing board of businessman and designer Ron Holder. First came the cabin sloop, in 1981; the next year, a daysailer version was introduced. Best features: The Holder has good sitting headroom compared to her comps. Foam flotation is intended to make her more or less sink-proof. Her relatively heavy swing keel keeps her minimum draft low for easy launching and retrieval at a ramp, while offering good stability with the keel in the 'down' position. With relatively high D/L and low SA/D compared with her comps, she should be stable in heavy air. Worst features: The steel swing keel can be a pain in the neck to keep from rusting."

== See also ==
- List of sailing boat types

Related development

- Vagabond 17

Similar sailboats

- Buzzards Bay 14
- Siren 17
