= Cape Cod Cat =

Sailboat class

- CCC

Development
- Designer: Charles Whittholz
- Location: United States
- Year: 1968
- Builders: Ted Hermann's Boat Shop; Cape Cod Shipbuilding
- Role: Day sailer-Cruiser
- Name: Cape Cod Cat

Boat
- Displacement: 2,200 lb (998 kg)
- Draft: 4.83 ft (1.47 m), centerboard down

Hull
- Type: Monohull
- Construction: Fiberglass
- LOA: 17.00 ft (5.18 m)
- LWL: 16.42 ft (5.00 m)
- Beam: 7.92 ft (2.41 m)
- Engine: outboard motor or optional inboard motor

Hull appendages
- Keel: keel and centerboard
- Ballast: 500 lb (227 kg)
- Rudder: transom-mounted rudder

Rig
- Rig type: Cat rig

Sails
- Sailplan: Gaff rigged catboat
- Mainsail area: 250.00 sq ft (23.226 m^{2})
- Total sail area: 250.00 sq ft (23.226 m^{2})

The Cape Cod Cat, also called the Cape Cod Cat 17 and the Hermann Cat, is an American trailerable sailboat that was designed by Charles Whittholz as a day sailer/cruiser and first built in 1968.

The Cape Cod Cat is a modernized development of the traditional catboat designs of the Cape Cod region.

== Production ==
The design was originally built by Ted Hermann's Boat Shop starting in 1968 and later by Cape Cod Shipbuilding in the United States, but it is now out of production. Cape Cod Shipbuilding indicates that it still has the molds and can put the boat back into production, if a fleet order is received.

== Design ==
The Cape Cod Cat is a recreational centerboard boat or keelboat, built predominantly of fiberglass, with teak wood trim. It is a gaff rigged catboat with aluminum spars, although a Bermuda rig was optional. The hull has a plumb stem, an angled transom, a transom-hung rudder controlled by a tiller and a fixed fin keel or optional keel and centerboard combination. It displaces 2,200 lb (998 kg) and carries 500 lb (227 kg) of lead ballast.

The keel-equipped version of the boat has a draft of 1.92 ft (0.59 m), while the centerboard-equipped version has a draft of 4.83 ft (1.47 m) with the centerboard extended and 1.67 ft (0.51 m) with it retracted, allowing beaching or ground transportation on a trailer.

The keel version of the boat may be fitted with a diesel or gasoline inboard engine. Alternatively both versions may be fitted with a transom engine mount for a small outboard motor for docking and maneuvering.

The design has a self-draining cockpit that can seat six. There is sleeping accommodation for two people below decks along with space for a sink, shelving and lockers for stowage, a head, as well as a stove for cooking. The fresh water tank has a capacity of 17 U.S. gallons (64 L; 14 imp gal).

== Operational history ==
In a 1994 review Richard Sherwood described it as, "a modern version of the classic catboat found near Cape Cod, this cat is produced in fiberglass. Both a keel version and a centerboard version are available, with sales to date giving a two-to-one preference to the keel, undoubtedly because there is then no trunk in either cockpit or cabin ... While indigenous to the Cape, the boat may also be found in the Great Lakes and Florida, and on the West Coast."

In a 2010 review Steve Henkel wrote, "The "CCC" is traditional and salty looking, with ample ability to cruise two for a week or more. The author owned Pipit, Hermann Cat hull #18, for several years, and sailed and trailered her all over New England ... The builder offers her either as a centerboarder ... or as a very shoal draft (1' 11") keel cat—not deep enough to give her satisfactory performance to windward. Best features: A big sail and low wetted surface make her quicker than her comp[etitor]s in light air. Layout below is perfect for two—especially if a forward hatch is added over the head, as the author did on Pipit. Worst features: Partly due to her hourglass hull form, she can become overpowered and hard to steer upwind under full sail at about 12 knots of breeze, until a reef is tucked in—a chore which is not difficult if jiffy reefing is used. Also, her cockpit footwell is too wide to provide a good footrest for some folks when she's heeled in a breeze."

== See also ==
- List of sailing boat types
