= Rhodes 18 =

1948 US sailing dinghy

Development
- Designer: Philip Rhodes
- Location: United States
- Year: 1948
- No. built: 700
- Builder: Cape Cod Shipbuilding
- Role: Day sailer-Sailing dinghy

Boat
- Crew: two
- Displacement: 800 lb (363 kg)
- Draft: 4.00 ft (1.22 m) with centerboard down

Hull
- Type: monohull
- Construction: fiberglass
- LOA: 18.00 ft (5.49 m)
- LWL: 17.00 ft (5.18 m)
- Beam: 6.25 ft (1.91 m)

Hull appendages
- Keel: centerboard
- Rudder: transom-mounted rudder

Rig
- Rig type: Bermuda rig

Sails
- Sailplan: fractional rigged sloop
- Spinnaker area: 197 sq ft (18.3 m^{2})
- Total sail area: 162 sq ft (15.1 m^{2})

The Rhodes 18 is a sailing dinghy built by Cape Cod Shipbuilding in the United States since 1948 and remains in production.

It is Rhodes' design #448. The boat was designed as a junior trainer for the Stamford Yacht Club in Connecticut.

The Rhodes 18 is a recreational sailboat, initially built from wood, since 1965 it has been constructed from fiberglass, with wood trim. The hull has decks all around the cockpit. It has a fractional sloop rig, a plumb stem, a vertical transom, a transom-hung rudder controlled by a tiller and a retractable centerboard or an optional fixed fin keel. The centerboard version displaces 800 lb (363 kg), while the keelboat model displaces 920 lb (417 kg). With no centerboard truck, the keel-equipped version provides more unobstructed cockpit space.

The boat will hold five adults, but is normally sailed with a crew of three.

The keel-equipped version of the boat has a draft of 2.67 ft (0.81 m), while the centerboard-equipped version has a draft of 4.00 ft (1.22 m) with the centerboard extended and 7 in (18 cm) with it retracted, allowing operation in shallow water, beaching or ground transportation on a trailer.

For sailing downwind the design may be equipped with a symmetrical spinnaker of 197 sq ft (18.3 m^{2}). The design has a hull speed of 5.52 kn (10.22 km/h).

As sold new, the boat does not come with sails, which are extra-cost options. Other options include a roller furling jib, boom vang, cockpit cover and a boat trailer for the centerboard version.

== Active Fleets ==
-Barnstable Yacht Club, Barnstable, MA (8 Boats)

-Dennis Yacht Club, Dennis, MA (8 Boats)

-Biddeford Pool Yacht Club, Biddeford Pool, ME (14 Boats)

== Rhodes 18 Nationals ==
The Rhodes 18 Nationals is an annual sailing regatta that rotates among three host clubs: Dennis Yacht Club, Barnstable Yacht Club, and Biddeford Pool Yacht Club. Each year, the regatta is held at one of these rotating venues, showcasing the unique sailing conditions and hospitality of the host club. Any Rhodes 18 sailers are encouraged to participate.
