= The Gods of the Copybook Headings =

Poem by Rudyard Kipling

A page from a 19th-century copybook, in which the printed headings have been copied. The homily is paraphrased from the 17th-century sermon Against Detraction by Isaac Barrow: "Good nature, like a bee, collects honey from every herb. Ill nature, like a spider, sucks poison from the flowers."

"The Gods of the Copybook Headings" is a poem by Rudyard Kipling, characterized by biographer Sir David Gilmour as one of several "ferocious post-war eruptions" of Kipling's souring sentiment concerning the state of Anglo-European society. It was first published in the Sunday Pictorial of London on 26 October 1919. In America, it was published as "The Gods of the Copybook Maxims" in Harper's Magazine in January 1920.

In the poem, Kipling's narrator counterposes the "Gods" of the title, who embody eternal truths, against "the Gods of the Market-Place", who represent an optimistic self-deception into which it supposes society has fallen in the early 20th century.

The "copybook headings" to which the title refers were proverbs or maxims, often drawn from sermons and Scripture extolling virtue and wisdom, that were printed at the top of the pages of copybooks, special notebooks used by 19th-century British schoolchildren. The students had to copy the maxims repeatedly, by hand, down the page. The exercise was thought to serve simultaneously as a form of moral education and penmanship practice.

== Poem ==
As I pass through my incarnations in every age and race,
I make my proper prostrations to the Gods of the Market-Place.
Peering through reverent fingers I watch them flourish and fall,
And the Gods of the Copybook Headings, I notice, outlast them all.

We were living in trees when they met us. They showed us each in turn
That Water would certainly wet us, as Fire would certainly burn:
But we found them lacking in Uplift, Vision and Breadth of Mind,
So we left them to teach the Gorillas while we followed the March of Mankind.

We moved as the Spirit listed. They never altered their pace,
Being neither cloud nor wind-borne like the Gods of the Market Place,
But they always caught up with our progress, and presently word would come
That a tribe had been wiped off its icefield, or the lights had gone out in Rome.

With the Hopes that our World is built on they were utterly out of touch.
They denied that the Moon was Stilton; they denied she was even Dutch.
They denied that Wishes were Horses; they denied that a Pig had Wings.
So we worshipped the Gods of the Market Who promised these beautiful things.

When the Cambrian measures were forming, They promised perpetual peace.
They swore, if we gave them our weapons, that the wars of the tribes would cease.
But when we disarmed They sold us and delivered us bound to our foe,
And the Gods of the Copybook Headings said: "Stick to the Devil you know."

On the first Feminian Sandstones we were promised the Fuller Life
(Which started by loving our neighbour and ended by loving his wife)
Till our women had no more children and the men lost reason and faith,
And the Gods of the Copybook Headings said: "The Wages of Sin is Death."

In the Carboniferous Epoch we were promised abundance for all,
By robbing selected Peter to pay for collective Paul;
But, though we had plenty of money, there was nothing our money could buy,
And the Gods of the Copybook Headings said: "If you don't work you die."

Then the Gods of the Market tumbled, and their smooth-tongued wizards withdrew,
And the hearts of the meanest were humbled and began to believe it was true
That All is not Gold that Glitters, and Two and Two make Four—
And the Gods of the Copybook Headings limped up to explain it once more.

As it will be in the future, it was at the birth of Man—
There are only four things certain since Social Progress began:—
That the Dog returns to his Vomit and the Sow returns to her Mire,
And the burnt Fool's bandaged finger goes wabbling back to the Fire;

And that after this is accomplished, and the brave new world begins
When all men are paid for existing and no man must pay for his sins,
As surely as Water will wet us, as surely as Fire will burn,
The Gods of the Copybook Headings with terror and slaughter return!

== Modern critical interpretation ==
Kipling's narrative voice contrasts the purported eternal wisdom of these commonplace texts with the fashionable and (in Kipling's view) naïve modern ideas of "the Market-Place", making oblique reference, by way of puns or poetic references to older geological time periods, to Welsh-born Lloyd George and Liberal efforts at disarmament ("the Cambrian measures"), feminism ("the ... Feminian Sandstones"), and socialist policies advocated by trade-unionists, many of whom were coalminers ("the Carboniferous Epoch").

In a footnote to a philosophical essay, Francis Slade compared Kipling's theme to Horace's Epistles I.10 ("The Advantages of Country Life"), in which the Roman poet says:

Drive Nature off with a pitchfork, she'll still press back,
And secretly burst in triumph through your sad disdain.

According to Slade, while the poem's verbosity is "far removed from Horace's elegant succinctness", it does "make the same point with some force".

John C. Bogle described the poem as "beautifully captur[ing] the thinking of Schumpeter and Keynes", who espoused, respectively, "entrepreneurship" and "animal spirits": both ideas of the market place.

T. S. Eliot included the poem in his 1941 collection A Choice of Kipling's Verse.
