= Mercer 44 =

Sailboat class

- M44

Development
- Designer: William H. Tripp Jr
- Location: United States
- Year: 1959
- No. built: 14
- Builders: Mercer Reinforced Plastics; Cape Cod Shipbuilding
- Role: Cruiser
- Name: Mercer 44

Boat
- Displacement: 27,000 lb (12,247 kg)
- Draft: 9.00 ft (2.74 m) with centerboard down

Hull
- Type: monohull
- Construction: fiberglass
- LOA: 44.00 ft (13.41 m)
- LWL: 30.00 ft (9.14 m)
- Beam: 11.75 ft (3.58 m)
- Engine: inboard engine

Hull appendages
- Keel: modified keel and centerboard
- Ballast: 8,600 lb (3,901 kg)
- Rudder: keel-mounted rudder

Rig
- Rig type: Bermuda rig
- I foretriangle height: 50.30 ft (15.33 m)
- J foretriangle base: 17.40 ft (5.30 m)
- P mainsail luff: 44.80 ft (13.66 m)
- E mainsail foot: 20.00 ft (6.10 m)

Sails
- Sailplan: masthead sloop
- Mainsail area: 448.00 sq ft (41.621 m^{2})
- Jib/genoa area: 437.61 sq ft (40.655 m^{2})
- Total sail area: 885.61 sq ft (82.276 m^{2})

The Mercer 44 is an American sailboat that was designed by William H. Tripp Jr as a bluewater cruiser and first built in 1959.

== Production ==
The design was designed for and initially built by Mercer Reinforced Plastics of Trenton, New Jersey, United States, who completed six boats between 1960 and 1962. Cape Cod Shipbuilding then acquired the design and built eight boats between 1965 and 1982. Production has ended but Cape Cod Shipbuilding notes that the molds are still available and that they will build more if a fleet order is received.

== Design ==
The Mercer 44 is a recreational keelboat, built predominantly of fiberglass, with wood trim. It has a masthead sloop rig or optional yawl rig. The hull has a spooned raked stem, a raised counter, plumb transom; a keel-mounted rudder controlled by a wheel and a fixed, modified long keel with a cutaway forefoot and a retractable centerboard. It displaces 27,000 lb (12,247 kg) and carries 8,600 lb (3,901 kg) of ballast.

The boat has a draft of 9.00 ft (2.74 m) with the centerboard extended and 4.25 ft (1.30 m) with it retracted, allowing operation in shallow water.

The boat is fitted with a diesel inboard engine. The fuel tank holds 68 U.S. gallons (260 L; 57 imp gal) and the fresh water tank has a capacity of 110 U.S. gallons (420 L; 92 imp gal).

The design has sleeping accommodation for seven people, with a double "V"-berth in the bow cabin, two straight settees in the main cabin that unfold into doubles and an aft cabin under the raised doghouse, with a single berth on the starboard side. The galley is located on the port side just forward of the companionway ladder under the raised doghouse. The galley is U-shaped and is equipped with a four-burner stove, an ice box and a sink. An optional navigation station can be fitted in place of the seventh bunk, on the starboard side aft. The head is located just aft of the bow cabin on the port side and includes a shower.

For sailing downwind the design may be equipped with a symmetrical spinnaker.

The boat has a hull speed of 7.34 kn (13.59 km/h).

== Operational history ==
The boat is supported by an active class club, Mercer 44 Sailboats.

== See also ==
- List of sailing boat types
