= Cape Cod Gemini =

Sailboat class

Development
- Designer: A. Sidney DeWolf Herreshoff
- Location: United States
- Year: 1955
- No. built: 150
- Builders: Herreshoff Manufacturing Company; Cape Cod Shipbuilding
- Role: Sailing dinghy
- Name: Cape Cod Gemini

Boat
- Crew: two
- Displacement: 440 lb (200 kg)
- Draft: 3.33 ft (1.01 m) with leeboard down

Hull
- Type: monohull
- Construction: fiberglass
- LOA: 16.08 ft (4.90 m)
- LWL: 14.75 ft (4.50 m)
- Beam: 5.58 ft (1.70 m)

Hull appendages
- Keel: twin leeboards
- Rudder: skeg-mounted/internally-mounted spade-type/transom-mounted rudder

Rig
- Rig type: Bermuda rig

Sails
- Sailplan: fractional rigged sloop
- Total sail area: 140.00 sq ft (13.006 m^{2})

The Cape Cod Gemini is an American sailing dinghy that was designed by A. Sidney DeWolf Herreshoff as a day sailer and first built in 1955.

== Production ==
The design was initially built by the Herreshoff Manufacturing Company and later by Cape Cod Shipbuilding in the United States. A total of 150 boats have been completed since 1955, but it is now out of production. The manufacturer indicates that the molds are still available and that production could be re-started with a fleet order.

== Design ==
The Cape Cod Gemini is a planing sailboat, initially built of wood and later constructed of fiberglass, with wood trim. It has a fractional sloop rig, a plumb stem, an angled transom, a transom-hung rudder controlled by a tiller and twin retractable leeboards. It displaces 440 lb (200 kg).

The boat has a draft of 3.33 ft (1.01 m) with a leeboard extended and 7 in (18 cm) with both retracted, allowing operation in shallow water, beaching or ground transportation on a trailer.

The design is normally sailed with a crew of two sailors, but can accommodate up to five adults.

The design has a hull speed of 5.15 kn (9.54 km/h).

== See also ==
- List of sailing boat types
