= As a dog returns to his vomit, so a fool repeats his folly =

Biblical proverb

"As a dog returns to his vomit, so a fool repeats his folly" is an aphorism which appears in the Book of Proverbs in the Bible — Proverbs 26:11 (Hebrew: כְּ֭כֶלֶב שָׁ֣ב עַל־קֵאֹ֑ו כְּ֝סִ֗יל שֹׁונֶ֥ה בְאִוַּלְתֹּֽו Kəḵeleḇ šāḇ ‘al-qê’ōw; kəsîl, šōwneh ḇə’iwwaltōw.), also partially quoted in the New Testament, 2 Peter 2:22. It means that fools are stubbornly inflexible and this is illustrated with the repulsive simile of the dog that eats its vomit again, even though this may be poisonous. Dogs were considered unclean in Biblical times as they were commonly scavengers of the dead and they appear in the Bible as repugnant creatures, symbolising evil. The reference to vomit indicates excessive indulgence and so also symbolises revulsion.

The incorrigible nature of fools is further emphasised in Proverbs 27:22, "Though you grind a fool in a mortar, grinding them like grain with a pestle, you will not remove his folly from him."

In Proverbs, the "fool" represents a person lacking moral behavior or discipline, and the "wise" represents someone who behaves carefully and righteously. The modern association of these words with intellectual capacity is not in the original context.

== Development ==
The Greek translation in the Septuagint developed the idea, imbuing it with a sense of shame and guilt, "As when a dog goes to his own vomit and becomes abominable, so is a fool who returns in his wickedness to his own sin." This was due to the contemporary idea of the fool as ungodly.

== Usage ==
The Second Epistle of Peter refers to the proverb (2 Peter 2:22), "But it is happened unto them according to the true proverb, The dog is turned to his own vomit again; and the sow that was washed to her wallowing in the mire." Kipling cites this in his poem The Gods of the Copybook Headings as one of several classic examples of repeated folly:

As it will be in the future, it was at the birth of Man
There are only four things certain since Social Progress began.
That the Dog returns to his Vomit and the Sow returns to her Mire,
And the burnt Fool's bandaged finger goes wabbling back to the Fire;

The proverb is a favourite of the British politician Ken Livingstone who used it on the occasion of his failure to rejoin the Labour Party in 2002. It was also used on occasion in the Parliament of Australia by Paul Keating, in reference to his political opponents.

In the TV programme Endeavour (the prequel to Inspector Morse), in the episode titled "Home," Endeavour returns to his family home to visit his sick father. He goes with his sister Joyce to a pub for a drink and the following is part of their conversation:

Joyce: "Why did you go back to Oxford?"
Endeavour: "Oh! A policeman goes where he's sent."
Joyce: "When I told Pop, he just said, 'Proverbs 26:11.'"
Endeavour: [Recognizing the verse] "Well I've many faults, God knows, but I try to draw the line at masochism. Besides, traditionally it's the killer that returns to the scene of the crime, not the... whatever I was."

== See also ==
- Digger wasps and their habit of sphexishness
