= Atlantic (sailboat) =

Type of racing boat

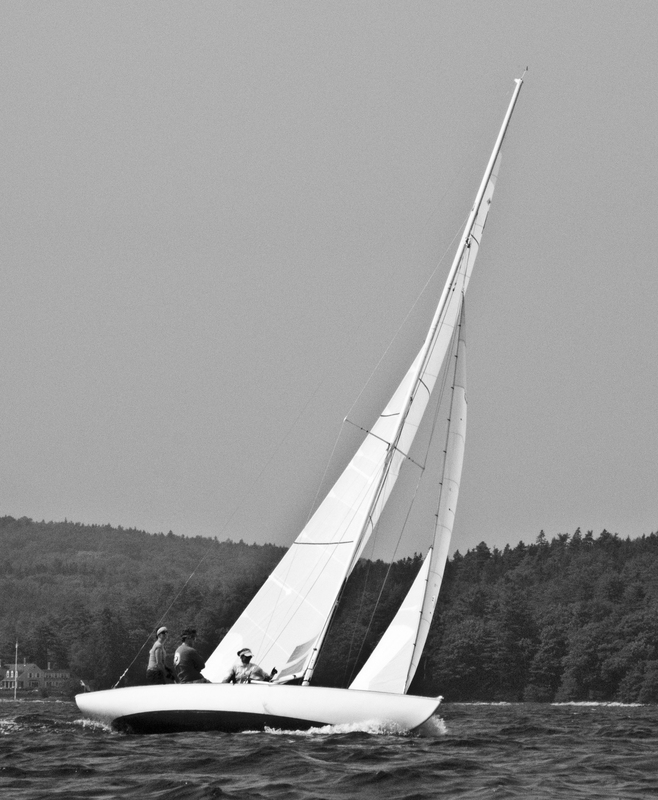

Development
- Designer: Starling Burgess
- Year: 1928
- Design: One-Design
- Name: Atlantic

Boat
- Crew: 3 – 5
- Displacement: 4,449 lb (2,018 kg)
- Draft: 4 ft 9 in (1.45 m)

Hull
- Type: Monohull
- Construction: Wood or Fiberglass
- LOA: 30 ft 8 in (9.35 m)
- LWL: 21 ft 9 in (6.63 m)
- Beam: 6 ft 6 in (1.98 m)

Hull appendages
- Keel: Fixed

Rig
- Rig type: Fractional rig

Sails
- Mainsail area: 276 ft^{2} (25.6 m^{2})
- Jib/genoa area: 101 ft^{2} (9.4 m^{2})
- Spinnaker area: 430 ft^{2} (40 m^{2})

The Atlantic is a one-design keelboat, designed by Starling Burgess in 1928. It is a 30-foot open-cockpit day sailer, typically used for day racing, rather than for overnight or ocean races. In the years following its design, fleets were established in several US ports along the eastern seaboard.

Today, the Atlantic is raced primarily in Long Island Sound and in coastal Maine, and boats are distributed among five fleets, with a total of approximately 50 boats in present use.

== Production ==
The design has been built by Cape Cod Shipbuilding and Seafarer Yachts in the United States, as well as by Abeking & Rasmussen in Bremen, Germany.

== Design ==
In 1928, Starling Burgess, then a well-known naval architect age 50, decided to try to design and establish a one-design sailboat that would be raced in fleets along the eastern seaboard of the United States. Working with German boat yard Abeking & Rasmussen, he designed a prototype which he showed to yacht clubs along the east coast. The initial cost of the boat was $1800, below that of competing boats.

The Atlantic is a racing keelboat, with early examples built predominantly of wood and later ones from fiberglass, with wood trim. It has a fractional sloop rig; a raked stem; a raised counter, angled transom; an open cockpit with no cabin; a keel-mounted rudder controlled by a tiller and a fixed fin keel. It displaces 4,559 lb (2,068 kg) and carries 2,835 lb (1,286 kg) of ballast.

The boat has a draft of 4.75 ft (1.45 m) with the standard keel and a hull speed of 6.21 kn (11.50 km/h).

== Operational history ==
The boat is supported by an active class club that organizes racing events, the Atlantic Class Association.

In 1930, there were 99 Atlantics, sailing in 13 fleets along Long Island Sound, the south shore of Long Island, Narragansett Bay, and Maine.

Three Atlantic sailors went on to win as skippers on America's Cup boats: Briggs Cunningham, Bus Mosbacher, and Bob Bavier.

In 1953, the Atlantic Class rules committee approved a rule change that allowed the reconstruction of the plank-on-frame Atlantics using fiberglass. The conversions were to be performed by Cape Cod Shipbuilding. Twenty boats were rebuilt using fiberglass between 1956 and 1958,, and since then nearly all existing boats have been converted. In addition, fifty new Atlantics have been built using fiberglass.

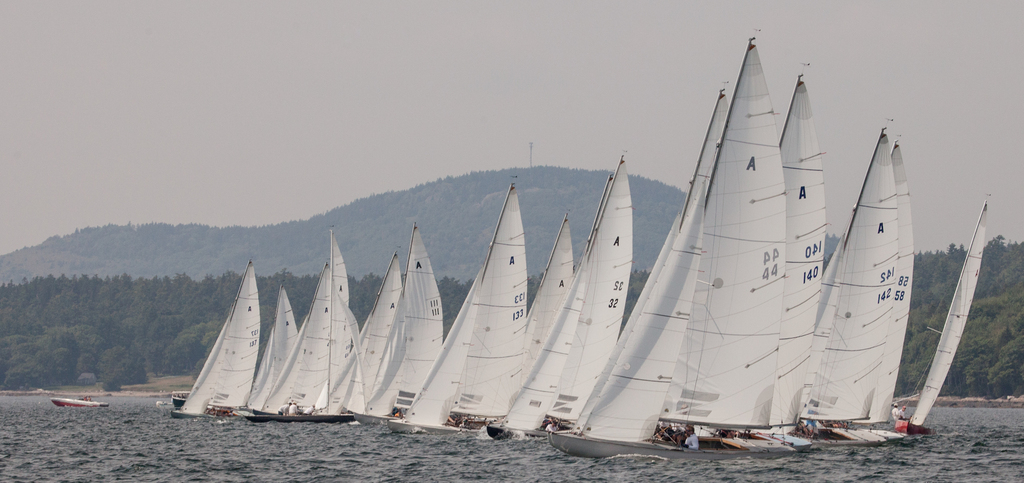
Start of an Atlantic Race

The Atlantic fleet remains active; its two largest-ever Nationals (with 41 boats each) were held in 1947 and 2012.

In a 1994 review Richard Sherwood wrote, "the original boats were built of wood during the twenties, and the boat was popular on Long Island Sound, where many famous names in sailing — Cunningham, Mosbacher, Romagna, Bavier, Shields, etc. — raced the boat. Later, the wooden hulls were replaced with FRP, with the original keels, spars, rudder and rigging transferred to the new hulls, Beginning in 1962, the boat was built totally new. A few boats have been modified for cruising and have a small deckhouse, with a Vee berth, a sink, and a head. "

=== Fleets ===
- Cedar Point Yacht Club (YC) - 18 boats
- Cold Spring Harbor YC - 9 boats
- Kollegewidgwok YC - 21 boats
- Niantic Bay YC - 9 boats
- Madison Beach Club - 7 boats
