= Beverly Dinghy =

Sailboat class

Development
- Designer: A. Sidney DeWolf Herreshoff
- Location: United States
- Year: 1953
- No. built: 500
- Builder: Cape Cod Shipbuilding
- Role: sailing dinghy-rowboat

Boat
- Displacement: 207 lb (94 kg)
- Draft: 1.30 ft (0.40 m) with centerboard down

Hull
- Type: monohull
- Construction: wood or fiberglass
- LOA: 11.50 ft (3.51 m)
- Beam: 4.50 ft (1.37 m)

Hull appendages
- Keel: centerboard
- Rudder: transom-mounted rudder

Rig
- Rig type: Cat rig

Sails
- Sailplan: Catboat
- Mainsail area: 66.00 sq ft (6.132 m^{2})
- Total sail area: 66.00 sq ft (6.132 m^{2})

The Beverly Dinghy is an American sailing dinghy or rowboat that was designed by A. Sidney DeWolf Herreshoff and first built in 1953. The boat can be employed as a yacht tender.

== Production ==
The design was built by Cape Cod Shipbuilding in the United States, starting in 1953. A total of 500 boats have been completed, but it is now out of production. The company has indicated that the molds are still available and that production could be restarted in response to a fleet order.

== Design ==
The Beverly Dinghy is a recreational sailboat or rowing dinghy, originally built from wood, but later from fiberglass, with wooden spars and trim. It has a catboat rig, a plumb stem, a vertical transom, a transom-hung rudder controlled by a tiller and a retractable centerboard. The sailing version displaces 207 lb (94 kg), while the rowboat model displaces 142 lb (64 kg).

The sailing version has a draft of 1.30 ft (0.40 m) with the centerboard extended and 3 in (7.6 cm) with it retracted, allowing operation in shallow water, beaching or ground transportation on a trailer.

The design has two seats mounted across the beam.

== See also ==
- List of sailing boat types
