= Isabelle Junot =

French-danish aristocrat, socialité and actress

- Marchioness de Cubas
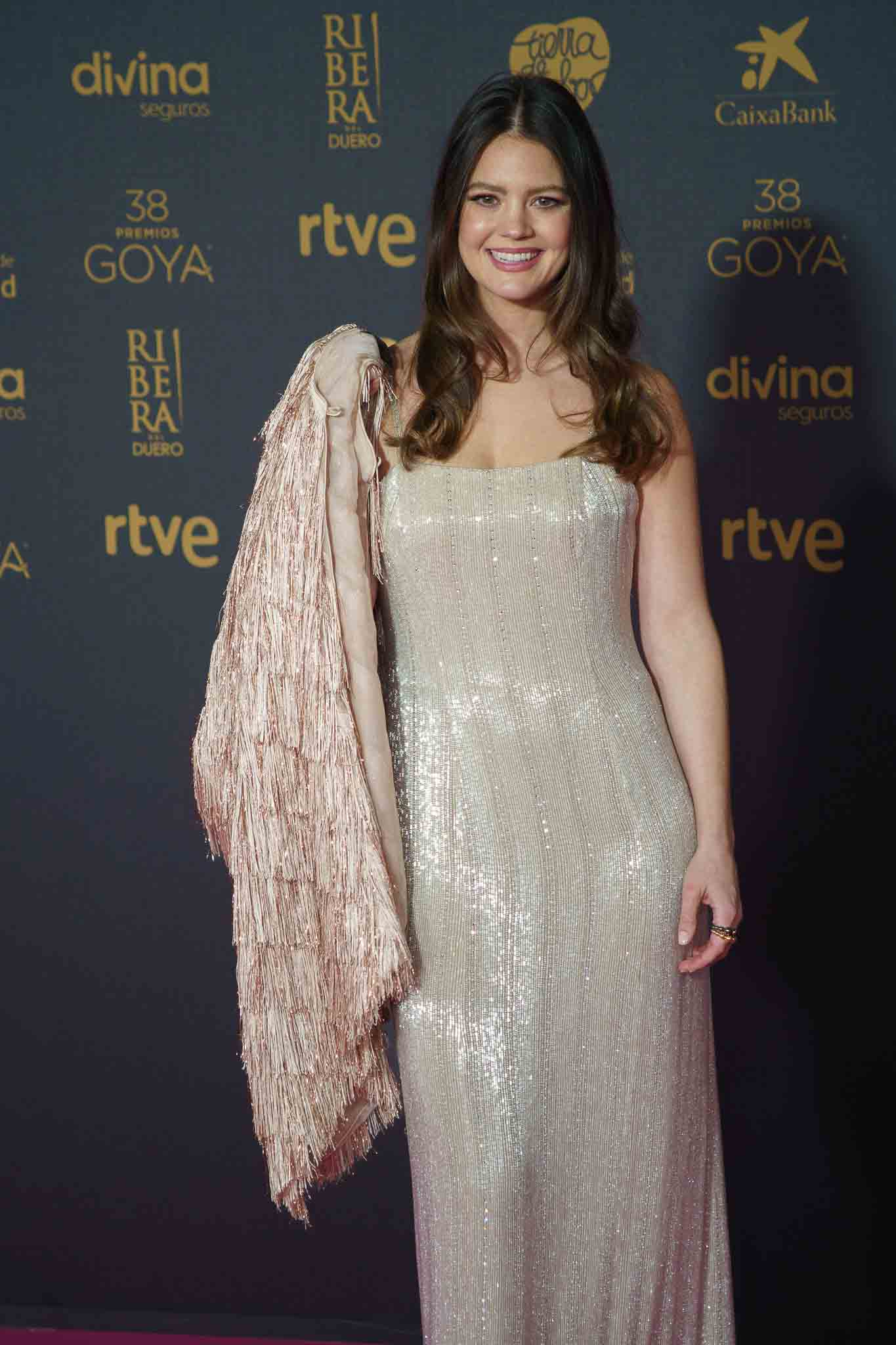
- Junot in 2024
- Born: 11 April 1991 (age 35); New York City, U.S.
- Spouses: Álvaro Falcó Chávarri, 4th Marquess de Cubas (m. 2022)
- Issue: Philippa Falcó
- Father: Philippe Junot
- Occupation: Actress

Isabelle Junot, Marchioness de Cubas (born 18 April 1991) is a French-Danish and Spanish aristocrat, actress and businesswoman.

== Biography ==
Isabelle Junot was born on 18 April 1991, in New York City, the daughter of French businessman Philippe Junot and Nina Wendelboe-Larsen, a Danish socialite and former model. Her father, who is also of Danish descent, was the first husband of Princess Caroline of Monaco. Patrilinearly, she is said to be descended from Jean-Andoche Junot, Duke of Abrantes.

She has two older siblings: Victoria and Alexis. She was born in New York City, and educated in Paris, Marbella, London, New York, Madrid and Geneva. She studied in Institut Le Rosey in Switzerland, a Swiss boarding school, and at the Lycée Français de New York, and Madrid.

She went to UVA University of Virginia. Subsequently, she continued her training in acting in New York She is a certified Holistic Health and Wellness coach. She is the author of EAT GIRL and promotes a healthy lifestyle and teaches how to overcome emotional eating and binge eating through her instagram community @isa.healthy.life, an 12 week online course, some masterclasses and free ebooks.

In 2022, she participated in the seventh edition of MasterChef Celebrity Spain, reaching the culinary talent semi-final.

== Personal life ==
On April 2, 2022, in Plasencia, Isabel married Álvaro Falcó, current holder of the Marquisate de Cubas, becoming Marchioness consort de Cubas. She is the cousin-in-law of the aristocrat Tamara Falcó, current holder of the Marquisate of Griñón. She gave birth to a daughter, Philippa, on 11 June 2023 and Simona on April 14 2026.

== Filmography ==
Year	Title	Role
2015	Body High	Rain
2015	Tophy	Angela
2017	This Is Tomorrow	Short Woman #1
2018	Stretch Marks	Michelle
2019	Fuel	Actress
