= Blue Chip 30 =

Sailboat class

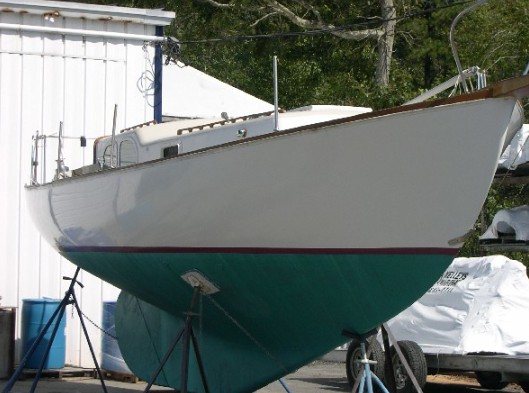
- A windson Blue chip 30 in Cape cod

Development
- Designer: A. Sidney DeWolf Herreshoff
- Location: United States
- Year: 1961
- Builder: Cape Cod Shipbuilding
- Role: Cruiser
- Name: Blue Chip 30

Boat
- Displacement: 7,000 lb (3,175 kg)
- Draft: 5.00 ft (1.52 m)

Hull
- Type: monohull
- Construction: fiberglass
- LOA: 29.83 ft (9.09 m)
- LWL: 23.16 ft (7.06 m)
- Beam: 9.00 ft (2.74 m)
- Engine: inboard engine

Hull appendages
- Keel: long keel
- Ballast: 3,250 lb (1,474 kg)
- Rudder: keel-mounted rudder

Rig
- Rig type: Bermuda rig
- I foretriangle height: 36.50 ft (11.13 m)
- J foretriangle base: 12.83 ft (3.91 m)
- P mainsail luff: 32.25 ft (9.83 m)
- E mainsail foot: 12.67 ft (3.86 m)

Sails
- Sailplan: masthead sloop
- Mainsail area: 204.30 sq ft (18.980 m^{2})
- Jib/genoa area: 234.15 sq ft (21.753 m^{2})
- Total sail area: 438.45 sq ft (40.733 m^{2})

The Blue Chip 30, also called the Cape Cod 30, is an American sailboat that was designed by A. Sidney DeWolf Herreshoff as a cruiser and first built in 1961.

== Production ==
The design was built by Cape Cod Shipbuilding in the United States from 1961 until 1985, but it is now out of production.

== Design ==
The Blue Chip 30 is a recreational keelboat, built predominantly of fiberglass, with wood trim. It has a masthead sloop rig; a spooned, raked stem with a bowsprit; a raised counter, angled transom, a keel-mounted rudder controlled by a tiller and a fixed long keel. It displaces 7,000 lb (3,175 kg) and carries 3,250 lb (1,474 kg) of lead ballast.

The boat has a draft of 5.00 ft (1.52 m) with the standard keel and is fitted with an inboard engine for docking and maneuvering.

The design has sleeping accommodation for four people, with a double "V"-berth in the bow cabin and a two straight settee berths in the main cabin. The galley is located on the starboard side just aft of the bow cabin. The galley is equipped with a two-burner stove, an ice box and a sink. The head is located just aft of the bow cabin on the port side.

The design has a hull speed of 6.45 kn (11.95 km/h).

== See also ==
- List of sailing boat types
