= International 110 =

Sailboat class

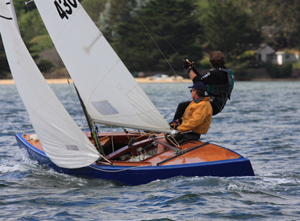

Development
- Designer: C. Raymond Hunt
- Location: United States
- Year: 1939
- No. built: 750
- Builders: Cape Cod Shipbuilding; W. D. Schock Corp; George Lawley & Son; Graves Yacht Yard; New Holland Marine Group
- Role: one-design racer
- Name: International 110

Boat
- Crew: two
- Displacement: 910 lb (413 kg)
- Draft: 3.00 ft (0.91 m)

Hull
- Type: monohull
- Construction: plywood or fiberglass
- LOA: 24.00 ft (7.32 m)
- LWL: 18.00 ft (5.49 m)
- Beam: 4.17 ft (1.27 m)

Hull appendages
- Keel: fin keel with weighted bulb
- Ballast: 300 lb (136 kg)
- Rudder: internally-mounted spade-type rudder

Rig
- Rig type: Bermuda rig

Sails
- Sailplan: fractional rigged sloop
- Spinnaker area: 200 sq ft (19 m^{2})
- Total sail area: 157 sq ft (14.6 m^{2})

Racing
- D-PN: 89.6

The International 110 is an American sailboat that was designed by C. Raymond Hunt as a one-design racer and first built in 1939.

While most boat designs have numerical designations that reflect their length overall, waterline length, displacement or some other dimensional parameter, the 110 class was named for the sail number that the prototype carried.

In 1946 the 110 was developed into the larger 29.83 ft (9.09 m) International 210.

== Production ==
In the past the design has been built at home by amateur builders, as well by a number of American manufacturers, including Cape Cod Shipbuilding, W. D. Schock Corp, George Lawley & Son and Graves Yacht Yard. The current builder is New Holland Marine Group in the United States and it remains available for order. A total of 750 examples of the design have been completed.

W. D. Schock Corp records indicate that they built 17 boats between 1966 and 1971.

== Design ==
The International 110 is a racing keelboat, with the early boats built from plywood and the more recent ones built with balsa core fiberglass. It has a fractional sloop rig with wooden or aluminum spars. The canoe hull features a flat bottom that allows planing. The hull has a plumb stem, a plumb transom, an internally mounted spade-type rudder mounted well forward and controlled by a tiller and a swept, fixed fin keel with a weighted bulb. It displaces 910 lb (413 kg) and carries 300 lb (136 kg) of iron ballast.

The boat has a draft of 3.00 ft (0.91 m) with the standard keel.

For sailing the design is equipped with a spinnaker of 200 sq ft (19 m^{2}), launched from a tube, plus a roller furling jib. It has a single trapeze, which is unusual in a keelboat. It has built-in buoyancy, which makes it unsinkable.

The design has a Portsmouth Yardstick DP-N racing average handicap of 89.6. It is normally sailed by a crew of two sailors or sometimes three.

== Operational history ==
The boat is supported by an active class club that organizes racing events, the International 110 Class Association.

In 1994 it was reported that the majority of the 110 racing fleets were in New England, on the US west coast and the US upper midwest.

In a 1994 review Richard Sherwood wrote, "this fin-keeler was a breakthrough design of the late thirties. Rule changes, allowing a trapeze, enabled the 110 to win the Keel Division of the One-of-a-Kind Regatta in 1969. She points extremely well, planes on the flat bottom, and goes well downwind, but unless weight is kept well aft the bow tends to bury. Because of the very simple lines, the 110 is easy to build ... The cockpit is small and, with the narrow beam, it is difficult to work off the foredeck."

== See also ==
- List of sailing boat types

Related development

- International 210
