= Cape Cod Mercury 15 =

Sailing dinghy first produced in 1940

Cape Cod Mercury 15 FK

Development
- Designer: Sparkman & Stephens
- Location: United States
- Year: 1940
- Builder: Cape Cod Shipbuilding
- Role: Sailing dinghy
- Name: Cape Cod Mercury 15 FK

Boat
- Displacement: 730 lb (331 kg)
- Draft: 2.42 ft (0.74 m)

Hull
- Type: Monohull
- Construction: Wood or Fiberglass
- LOA: 15.00 ft (4.57 m)
- LWL: 13.83 ft (4.22 m)
- Beam: 5.42 ft (1.65 m)

Hull appendages
- Keel: fin keel
- Ballast: 200 lb (91 kg)
- Rudder: transom-mounted rudder

Rig
- Rig type: Bermuda rig

Sails
- Sailplan: Fractional rigged sloop
- Total sail area: 119 sq ft (11.1 m^{2})

The Cape Cod Mercury 15, is a sailing dinghy, first built in 1940 by Cape Cod Shipbuilding in the United States, and remained in production in 2020 after 80 years.

Also called the Mercury Sloop and just the Mercury, it is sometimes confused with the unrelated Ernest Nunes 1939 Mercury 18.

== Design ==
Designed by Sparkman & Stephens, it is a recreational keelboat or dinghy, depending on the model, originally built of wood, since 1948 it has been constructed of fiberglass, with wood trim. The hull has a spooned plumb stem, a plumb transom, a transom-hung rudder controlled by a tiller and a fixed fin keel or a retractable centerboard.

The design has accommodation for five people, but is normally sailing with a crew of two sailors.

An optional teak motor mount is available to allow use of an outboard motor for docking and maneuvering.

It has a fractional sloop rig with aluminum spars. It may be equipped with an optional genoa and spinnaker. Roller furling, a boom vang and boat trailers for both versions are also optional.

== Variants ==
Cape Cod Mercury 15 FK
This fixed keel model has a draft of 2.42 ft (0.74 m) with the standard keel. It has a displacement of 730 lb (330 kg) and carries 200 lb (91 kg) of iron ballast.
Cape Cod Mercury 15 CB
This centerboard model has a draft of 3.25 ft (0.99 m) with the centerboard down and 6 in (15 cm) with the centerboard retracted. The boat displaces 470 lb (213 kg).
