= Herreshoff Goldeneye =

Sailboat class

Development
- Designer: A. Sidney DeWolf Herreshoff and Nathanael Greene Herreshoff
- Location: United States
- Year: 1959
- Builder: Cape Cod Shipbuilding
- Role: Day sailer-cruiser

Boat
- Displacement: 2,500 lb (1,134 kg)
- Draft: 3.00 ft (0.91 m)

Hull
- Type: monohull
- Construction: fiberglass
- LOA: 18.25 ft (5.56 m)
- LWL: 15.83 ft (4.82 m)
- Beam: 6.33 ft (1.93 m)

Hull appendages
- Keel: long keel
- Ballast: 1,320 lb (599 kg)
- Rudder: keel-mounted rudder

Rig
- Rig type: Bermuda rig
- I foretriangle height: 24.90 ft (7.59 m)
- J foretriangle base: 7.70 ft (2.35 m)
- P mainsail luff: 22.80 ft (6.95 m)
- E mainsail foot: 9.60 ft (2.93 m)

Sails
- Sailplan: masthead sloop
- Mainsail area: 109.44 sq ft (10.167 m^{2})
- Jib/genoa area: 95.87 sq ft (8.907 m^{2})
- Total sail area: 205.31 sq ft (19.074 m^{2})

The Herreshoff Goldeneye is an American trailerable sailboat, designed as a day sailer and cruiser and first built in 1959. The hull lines were designed by Nathanael Greene Herreshoff and the rig by A. Sidney DeWolf Herreshoff.

The boat is based on Nathanael Greene Herreshoff's 1914 design, the Bull's Eye and is Herreshoff's design No. 1133.

== Production ==
The design has been built by Cape Cod Shipbuilding in the United States, since 1959, and remains in production.

== Design ==
The Goldeneye is a recreational keelboat, built predominantly of fiberglass, with wood trim. It has a masthead sloop rig; a plumb stem with a bowsprit; a raised counter, angled transom; a keel-mounted rudder controlled by a tiller, a self-bailing cockpit and a fixed long keel. It displaces 2,500 lb (1,134 kg) and carries 1,320 lb (599 kg) of lead ballast.

The boat has a draft of 3.00 ft (0.91 m) with the standard keel. It has a small cuddy cabin, with sleeping accommodation for two people and an optional portable head.

The boat is optionally fitted with a small outboard motor for docking and maneuvering. Sails, lifelines, a cradle, a boat trailer and a compass are also all additional-cost options.

For sailing the design may be equipped with a range of jibs, genoas and a symmetrical spinnaker.

The design has a hull speed of 5.33 kn (9.87 km/h).

== See also ==
- List of sailing boat types
