= No One Would Listen =

Book by Harry Markopolos

No One Would Listen: A True Financial Thriller
- Hardcover edition
- Author: Harry Markopolos
- Language: English
- Genre: Non-fiction
- Publisher: Wiley
- Publication date: March 2, 2010
- Publication place: United States
- Media type: Print, e-book
- Pages: 376
- ISBN: 978-0-470-55373-2
- OCLC: 751127587

No One Would Listen: A True Financial Thriller is a book by whistleblower Harry Markopolos about his investigation into the Madoff investment scandal and how the U.S. Securities and Exchange Commission failed to react to his warnings. The book was released on March 2, 2010, by John Wiley & Sons.

== Reception ==
The New York Journal of Books felt that the book provided "a really insightful look into the world of high finance, and the best explanation of the Madoff fraud", but found that it had "too much ... about Markopolos himself, his family, his friends". Publishers Weekly called it "an astonishing true-life whodunit", with the repercussions of Madoff's downfall serving as "a satisfying conclusion"; LexisNexis, however, faulted Markopolos for being overly critical of the SEC, and at the Wall Street Journal, Richard Tofel (while conceding the quality of Markopolos's investigative work) stated that—by describing his own fears of retribution from organized crime—Markopolos "sheds more light than he intends on just why no one would listen".

Markopolos was a guest on The Daily Show with Jon Stewart on March 8, 2010.
