= Vagabond 17 =

1970s American trailer sailer

Development
- Designer: Ron Holder
- Location: United States
- Year: 1976
- No. built: 400
- Builder: Vagabond Boats
- Role: Cruiser
- Name: Vagabond 17

Boat
- Displacement: 950 lb (431 kg)
- Draft: 4.17 ft (1.27 m) with keel down

Hull
- Type: Monohull
- Construction: Fiberglass
- LOA: 17.00 ft (5.18 m)
- LWL: 15.00 ft (4.57 m)
- Beam: 7.25 ft (2.21 m)

Hull appendages
- Keel: swing keel
- Ballast: 345 lb (156 kg)
- Rudder: transom-mounted rudder

Rig
- Rig type: Bermuda rig
- I foretriangle height: 18.80 ft (5.73 m)
- J foretriangle base: 6.60 ft (2.01 m)
- P mainsail luff: 20.00 ft (6.10 m)
- E mainsail foot: 7.80 ft (2.38 m)

Sails
- Sailplan: Fractional rigged sloop Masthead sloop
- Mainsail area: 78.00 sq ft (7.246 m^{2})
- Jib/genoa area: 62.04 sq ft (5.764 m^{2})
- Spinnaker area: 165 sq ft (15.3 m^{2})
- Total sail area: 140.04 sq ft (13.010 m^{2})

The Vagabond 17 is a recreational keelboat first built in 1976 by Vagabond Boats in the United States. A total of 400 boats were built, but it is now out of production.

The design was developed into the Holder 17 in 1982.

The fiberglass hull has a raked stem, a vertical transom, a transom-hung rudder controlled by a tiller. There is a bow-mounted stainless steel pulpit and the hull is equipped with positive flotation. The boat has a draft of 4.17 ft (1.27 m) with the locking swing keel extended and 1.67 ft (0.51 m) with it retracted, which helps launching and beaching."

The design has sleeping accommodation for four people, with a split double "V"-berth in the bow and two quarter berths in the main cabin. The galley includes a sink and water tank. The head is located behind a partial bulkhead.

It is a fractional sloop rig with aluminum spars and can be equipped with a 150% genoa and optional winches for handling it. It can be equipped with an asymmetrical spinnaker of 165 sq ft (15.3 m^{2}).
