= Philippe Junot =

French venture capitalist (1940–2026)

- Born: 19 April 1940; Paris, France
- Died: 8 January 2026 (aged 85); Madrid, Spain
- Occupations: Venture capitalist, property developer
- Spouses: Princess Caroline of Monaco (m. 1978; div. 1980) Nina Wendelboe-Larsen (m. 1987; div. 1997)
- Partner: Helén Wendel
- Children: 4

Philippe Junot (French: [filip ʒyno]; 19 April 1940 – 8 January 2026) was a French venture capitalist and property developer, who was the first husband of Princess Caroline of Monaco. He had business interests in Paris, Spain, and New York City.

== Background ==
Philippe Junot was the son of Michel Junot, Deputy Mayor of Paris, former President of Maison de l'Europe, and Lydia Thykjær, the daughter of a Danish industrialist. His father worked as a politician for several years, including working with the U.S. President John F Kennedy. The Junot family name figures on the Arc de Triomphe in Paris.

== Education and career ==
Junot started his career in the United States (he was an early investor in the Jack in the Box fast-food hamburger chain), and then formed a series of small start-up companies in France, ranging from real estate to renewable energy. Junot was one of the founders of Access International Advisors Group (AIA Group), a hedge fund platform. He was among the large number of investors to be duped by Bernard Madoff's Ponzi scheme which collapsed in late 2008.

== Personal life and death ==
In Monaco, he married civilly on 28 June 1978, and religiously on 29 June, Princess Caroline, eldest daughter of Rainier III, Prince of Monaco, and former Hollywood icon Grace Kelly. The couple were divorced on 9 October 1980. He married Nina Wendelboe-Larsen in October 1987, and they had three children: Victoria, Isabelle, and Alexis. They separated in 1997. In 2005 Philippe Junot had a daughter in Paris named Chloé Junot Wendel with Swedish model Helén Wendel.

Junot died in Madrid on 8 January 2026, at the age of 85.
