= Access International Advisors =

American feeder fund for Bernie Madoff

- Type: hedge fund
- Founded: 1994
- Founder: René-Thierry Magon de la Villehuchet and Patrick Littaye

Access International Advisors and Marketers (AIA Group), a Securities and Exchange Commission-registered investment advisor and a hedge fund of funds, was a research analyst investment agency that specialized in managing hedged and structured investment portfolios that involve commercial physical and biological research. It was a feeder fund into the securities firm of Bernie Madoff, as part of the Madoff investment scandal.

== History ==
The company was co-founded in 1994 by French bankers, yachtsman René-Thierry Magon de la Villehuchet (the former CEO of Crédit Lyonnais Securities USA) and Patrick Littaye. Philippe Junot, the first husband of Princess Caroline of Monaco, was a partner of the company.

The firm told investors in 2008 that it conducted extensive due diligence on funds in which it invested.

Access International Advisors LLC’s LuxAlpha Sicav-American Selection was a UCITS fund that invested 95% of its money with Bernie Madoff. It had $1.4 billion in net assets a month before Madoff's December 2008 arrest and was exposed for $1.4 billion, which it had placed with Madoff's securities fund, in the Madoff Ponzi scheme. It failed after Madoff’s activities were discovered.

De la Villehuchet harboured some hope of recovering the money he'd lost to Madoff–including his and Littaye's personal fortunes. However, by December 18, a week after the scandal, it was apparent that all was irretrievably lost, and that both he and AIA were finished. He didn't have nearly enough money to pay his employees or the rent, and there were rumors that he'd face criminal charges. A friend told him, "Your professional life is over."

On December 23, 2008, less than two weeks after Madoff's arrest, de la Villehuchet reportedly committed suicide. He was found dead in his company office on Madison Avenue in New York City. His wrists and left bicep were slit, and de la Villehuchet had taken sleeping pills, in what appeared to be a suicide. Although no suicide note was found at the scene, his brother in France received a note shortly after his death in which he expressed remorse and a feeling of responsibility.

In 2009, Littaye was charged in France with participating in a breach of trust, a crime punishable by as many as three years in prison.

== See also ==
- List of investors in Bernard L. Madoff Securities
