= To rob Peter to pay Paul =

English idiom of biblical origin

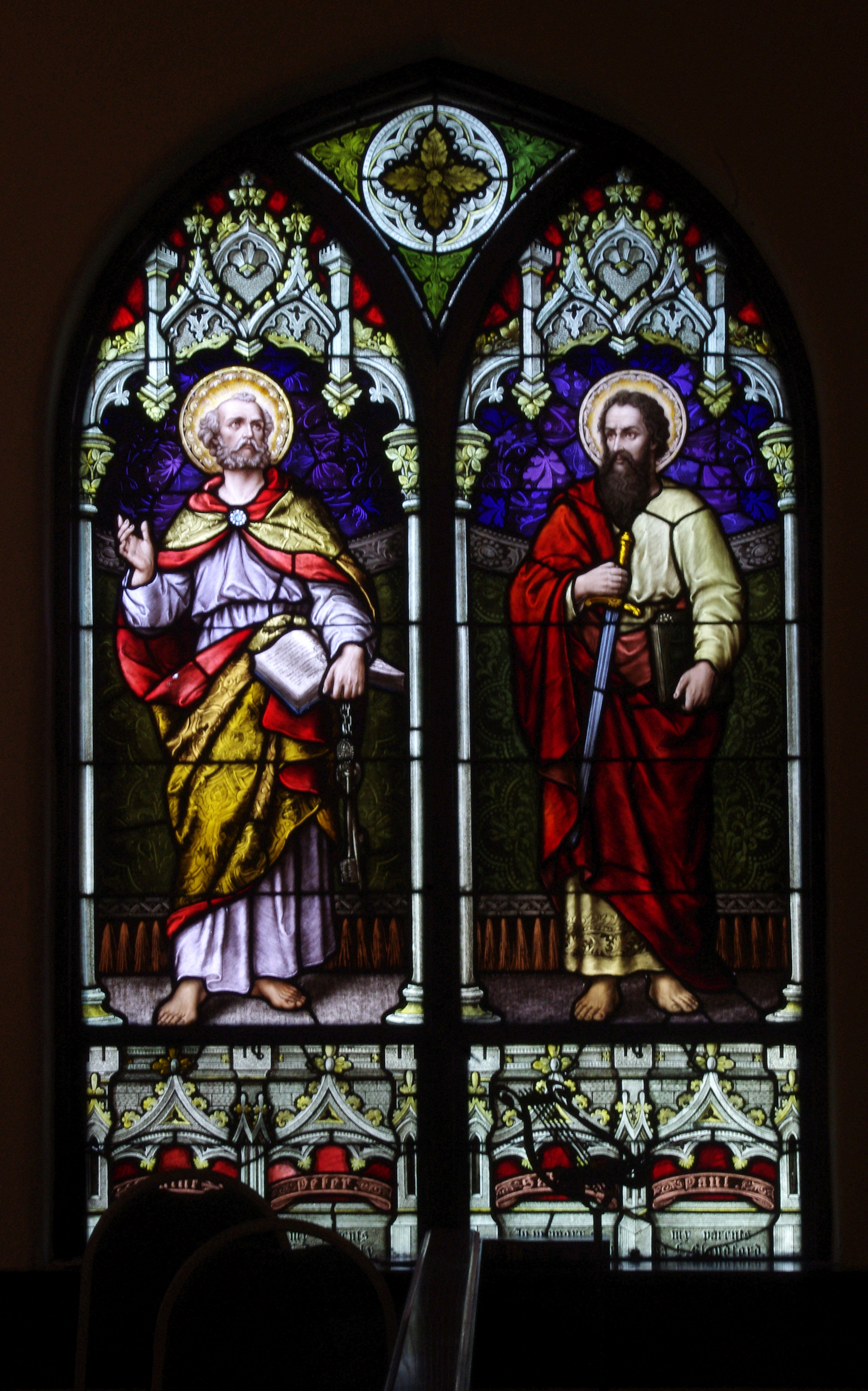
A stained glass depiction of Saints Peter and Paul

"To rob Peter to pay Paul", and similar variants that have developed over the centuries such as "to borrow from Peter to pay Paul", and "to unclothe Peter to clothe Paul", are English idioms meaning to take from one person to give to another, especially when it results in the elimination of one debt by incurring another. Similar phrases are found in many languages. "Manoeuvring the Apostles", which has the same meaning, was derived from this expression. In patchwork, "Rob Peter to pay Paul" is an alternative name for the Drunkard's Path patchwork block.

The phrase dates back to at least 1380. It may have originated in Middle English as a collocation of common names similar to Tom, Dick, and Harry, possibly reinforced by the alliteration. The phrase has also been understood as a reference to two of the (martyred) apostles, Saint Peter and Saint Paul, though that association may have come later. These two apostles were often depicted together in Christian art, both commemorated in the Feast of Saints Peter and Paul (June 29; an important date in the calendar of saints in medieval England), and joint namesakes of many churches (the medieval English people were almost universally Christian).

Later, a myth regarding the origin of the phrase arose in English folklore, connecting it to a sequence of events in the middle of the 15th century: the abbey church of Saint Peter, Westminster was deemed a cathedral by letters patent; ten years later it was absorbed into the diocese of London when the diocese of Westminster was dissolved; a few years after that, many of its assets were expropriated for repairs to Saint Paul's Cathedral.

"Robbing selected Peter to pay for collective Paul" is Rudyard Kipling's adaptation of the phrase, used to criticize the concepts of income redistribution and collectivism. Kipling included the expression in his poem "Gods of the Copybook Headings" and argued that it should be featured in "catechisms" of the Conservative Central Organization; the lesson of the phrase in his version and of the poem in general was that "only out of the savings of the thrifty can be made the wage-fund to set other men on the way to be prosperous."

== See also ==
- Ponzi scheme
- Robin Hood
