= Shields (keelboat) =

U.S. one-design racing keelboat

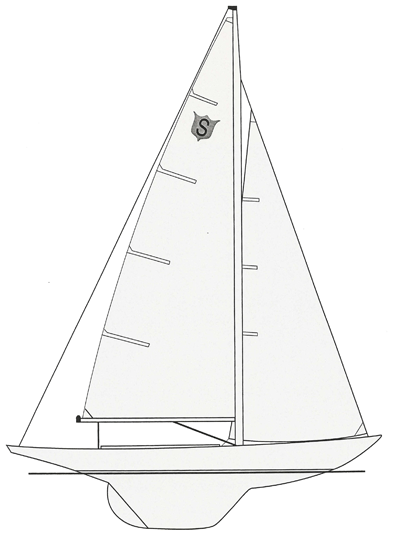

Development
- Designer: Olin Stephens of Sparkman & Stephens
- Location: United States
- Year: 1962
- No. built: 259 hulls have been built to date
- Builders: Cape Cod Shipbuilding; Hinckley Yachts; Chris-Craft Industries
- Name: Shields

Boat
- Displacement: 4,600 lb (2,087 kg)
- Draft: 4.75 ft (1.45 m)

Hull
- Type: monohull
- Construction: fiberglass
- LOA: 30.21 ft (9.21 m)
- LWL: 20.00 ft (6.10 m)
- Beam: 6.42 ft (1.96 m)

Hull appendages
- Keel: modified long keel
- Ballast: 3,080 lb (1,397 kg)
- Rudder: keel-mounted rudder

Rig
- Rig type: Bermuda rig
- I foretriangle height: 29.88 ft (9.11 m)
- J foretriangle base: 9.33 ft (2.84 m)
- P mainsail luff: 33.38 ft (10.17 m)
- E mainsail foot: 13.38 ft (4.08 m)

Sails
- Sailplan: fractional rigged sloop
- Mainsail area: 223.31 sq ft (20.746 m^{2})
- Jib/genoa area: 139.39 sq ft (12.950 m^{2})
- Spinnaker area: 360 sq ft (33 m^{2})
- Total sail area: 362.70 sq ft (33.696 m^{2})

Racing
- D-PN: 83.8 (suspect)

The Shields, also called the Shields 30 and the Shields One-Design, is a one-design racing keelboat first built in 1962, in the United States. The design was commissioned as a fiberglass replacement for the 1930s International One Design and is Sparkman & Stephens design #1720. Shields had boats with hull numbers 1 to 31 constructed at Cape Cod Shipbuilding and he donated them to several American universities on the US east coast. The boat class was named after him in honor of his donations. In the end he donated over 100 of the boats to various colleges and universities, including 15 donated to universities in southern California.

The design was initially built by Cape Cod Shipbuilding, then hull numbers 32 to 189 by Chris-Craft Industries and hull numbers 190 to 200 by Hinckley Yachts. Today it is once again hull numbers 201 to 259 built by Cape Cod Shipbuilding and remains in production. 5 hull numbers were assigned to boats that were built to replace the 5 Navy War College boats that had burned.

== Design ==
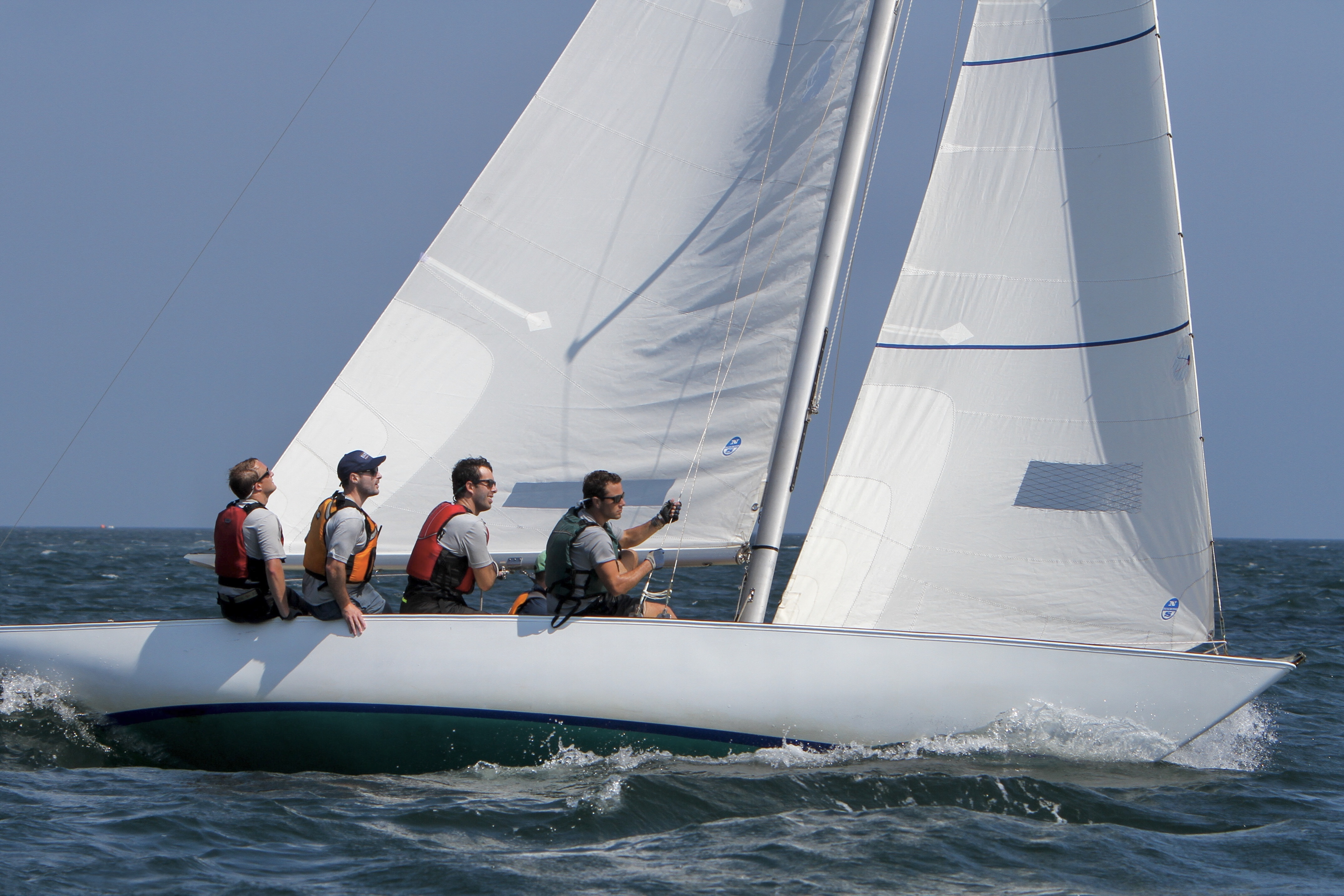
Shields going to windward

The Shields is built predominantly of fiberglass, with teak wood trim, including teak coamings, toe-rails, handrails, the cockpit floor grating and the cockpit seats. It has a fractional sloop rig with aluminum spars. The hull has a spooned, raked stem; a sharply raised counter, angled transom; a keel-mounted rudder controlled by a tiller and a fixed modified long keel. There is no cabin. It displaces 4,600 lb (2,087 kg) and carries 3,080 lb (1,397 kg) of lead ballast.

The boat has a draft of 4.75 ft (1.45 m) with the standard keel.

For sailing the design is equipped with a halyard winch console, with vertical cleats to secure the halyards. The design rules limit the adjustable backstay, the boom vang and the mainsheet to a maximum of an 8:1 mechanical advantage. A jib is used, but a genoa is not permitted under class rules. Buoyancy is provided by under-seat flotation compartments and fore and aft watertight bulkheads. A spinnaker of 360 sq ft (33 m^{2}) may be used.

The current Cape Cod production boat has, as standard equipment, a 4:1 boom vang, 8:1 backstay and a 4:1 mainsheet traveler. Optional equipment includes a bilge pump, spinnaker and launch basket, Cunningham, a digital compass and a boat trailer for ground transportation.

The design has a Portsmouth Yardstick DP-N racing average handicap of 83.8 (listed as "suspect").

== Operational history ==
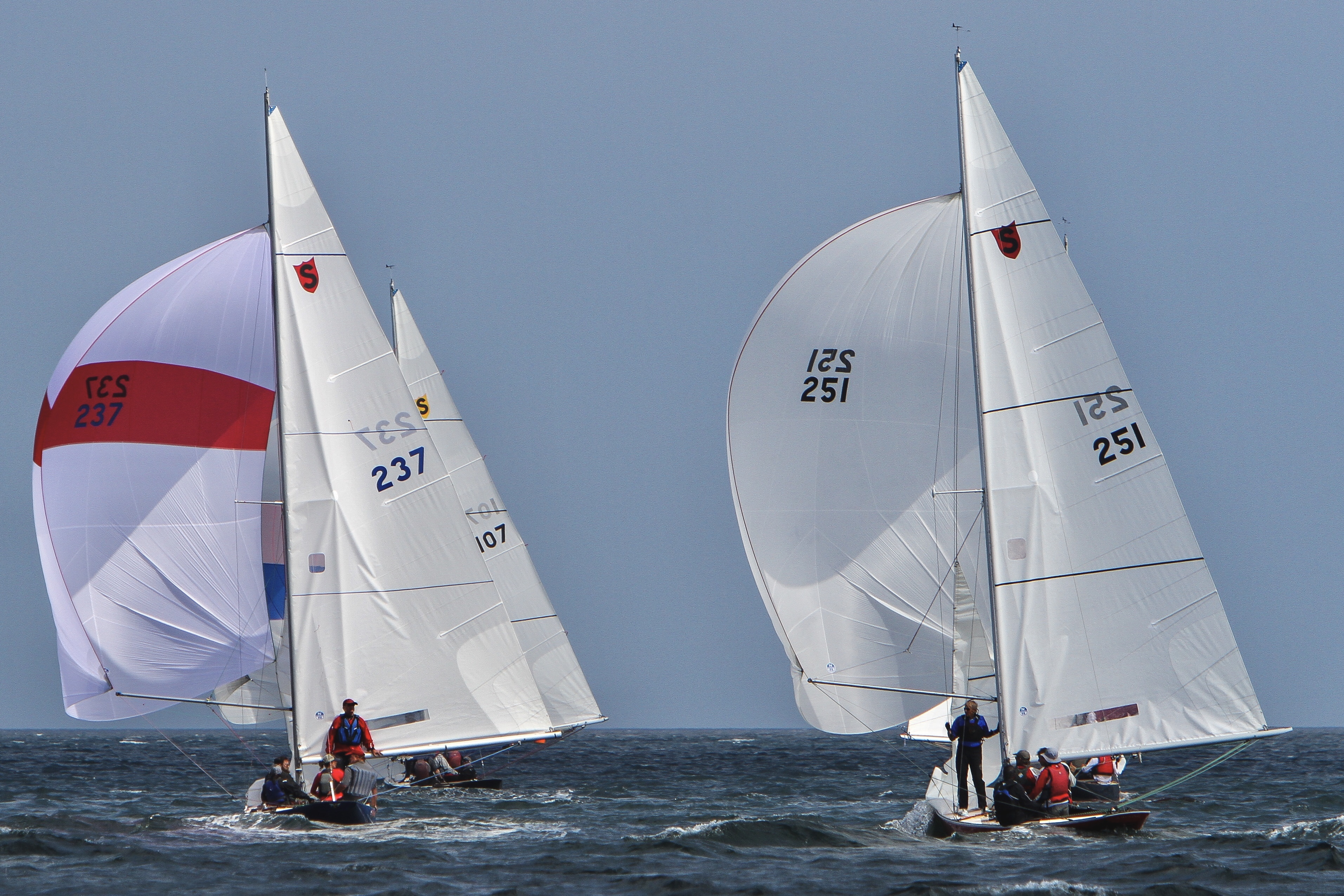
Shields racing downwind, with spinnakers flying

The boat is supported by an active class club that organizes racing events, the Shields Class Sailing Association. There are racing fleets only found in the USA in the Northeast, Midwest. Southeast. Mid Atlantic and in California.

The Orange Coast College School of Sailing & Seamanship, a public community college in Costa Mesa, California operates a fleet of Shields for their training program, mostly consisting of boats donated by Shields, plus Oakcliff Sailing on Long Island, New York.

In a 1994 review Richard Sherwood wrote, "this beautiful boat is used for day sailing and, particularly, for racing. Class rules are rigid. For example, only one set of sails is allowed per year."
