= Herreshoff 12½ =

- H

Development
- Designer: Nathanael Greene Herreshoff
- Year: 1914
- Design: One-Design

Boat
- Displacement: 1,500 lb
- Draft: 2' 6"

Hull
- Type: Monohull
- Construction: Carvel; Fiberglass- GRP
- LOA: 15' 10"
- LWL: 12' 6"
- Beam: 5' 10"

Hull appendages
- Keel: Fixed
- Ballast: 735 lb

Rig
- Rig type: Marconi rig Gaff rig Wishbone rig

Sails
- Total sail area: 140 sq. ft.

Rating
- D-PN: 110.9

The Herreshoff 12½ Footer is a one-design keelboat.

== History ==
Nathanael Greene Herreshoff designed the 12½ footer in 1914 at the age of 66. It has been in continuous production since then, and is nearly universally acclaimed as one of the finest small boats of all time. He had already accumulated 5 of the never-matched record of 6 consecutive America's Cup defenses, and 6 consecutive victories.

The Herreshoff Manufacturing Company took the first orders for the 12½ footer in 1914 and built 364 wooden hulls through 1943. Following the closing of HMC production, the Quincy Adams Yacht Yard was licensed by HMC to build the design. Quincy Adams used the Herreshoff builder's plate, and built 51 hulls from 1943 through 1948. The Quincy Adams boats had hull numbers in the 2000s, and were planked with mahogany rather than the white cedar used by HMC. They also have something of a reverse sheer forward.

In 1947, Cape Cod Shipbuilding acquired the rights to the design. They built about 35 wooden hulls between 1948 and 1950, when they switched to fiberglass.

Another company, Doughdish, Inc. is building a fiberglass version of the 12½. Since Cape Cod's rights prohibit anyone else from using the trademarked named “Herreshoff 12½”, the boat is called Doughdish. The molds were created by taking the lines from three original wooden hulls. Bill Harding, the creator of the Doughdish, took great pains to ensure his boat was an exact replica of the original, even eschewing the weight reductions afforded by fiberglass construction to ensure the Doughdish is authentic in every way (other than building material). In fact, the Doughdish is allowed to compete against the original wooden boats in association regattas, while the Cape Cod Shipbuilding 12½ is not. Finally, since 2006 the Herreshoff 12½ is once again available in wood from Artisan Boatworks (Note: Herreshoff 12 1/2 by N. G. Herreshoff. "Herreshoff 12 1/2". Artisan Boatworks.) of Rockport, ME.

The design was developed into the Bull's Eye, also first built in 1914 and the Buzzards Bay 14, designed in 1940.
