= Outlaw 26 =

Sailboat class

Development
- Designer: Philip Rhodes
- Location: United States
- Year: 1965
- No. built: 80
- Builder: O'Day Corp.
- Name: Outlaw 26

Boat
- Displacement: 5,050 lb (2,291 kg)
- Draft: 4.25 ft (1.30 m)

Hull
- Type: Monohull
- Construction: Fiberglass
- LOA: 26.00 ft (7.92 m)
- LWL: 19.00 ft (5.79 m)
- Beam: 8.00 ft (2.44 m)
- Engine: Outboard motor

Hull appendages
- Keel: long keel
- Ballast: 2,300 lb (1,043 kg)
- Rudder: keel-mounted rudder

Rig
- Rig type: Bermuda rig
- I foretriangle height: 29.50 ft (8.99 m)
- J foretriangle base: 9.80 ft (2.99 m)
- P mainsail luff: 25.50 ft (7.77 m)
- E mainsail foot: 11.50 ft (3.51 m)

Sails
- Sailplan: Masthead sloop
- Mainsail area: 146.63 sq ft (13.622 m^{2})
- Jib/genoa area: 144.55 sq ft (13.429 m^{2})
- Total sail area: 291.18 sq ft (27.052 m^{2})

The Outlaw 26 is an American sailboat that was designed by Philip Rhodes as a cruiser and first built in 1965.

== Production ==
The design was built by O'Day Corp. in the United States between 1965 and 1968, with 80 examples completed.

After production had been completed the molds for the Outlaw 26 design were sold to Northern Yachts of Ajax, Ontario, Canada. The design was developed into the Northern 25 in 1970, with the addition of a fin keel and a taller cabin.

== Design ==
The Outlaw 26 is a recreational keelboat, built predominantly of fiberglass, with wood trim. It has a masthead sloop rig, a spooned raked stem, a raised transom, a keel- mounted rudder controlled by a tiller and a fixed long keel. It displaces 5,050 lb (2,291 kg) and carries 2,300 lb (1,043 kg) of ballast.

The boat has a draft of 4.25 ft (1.30 m) with the standard keel fitted.

A tall rig version was available, with a mast about 2.0 ft (0.61 m) higher than standard for locations with lighter average winds.

The boat is normally fitted with a small outboard motor in a transom well, for docking and maneuvering.

The design has a hull speed of 5.84 kn (10.82 km/h).

== See also ==
- List of sailing boat types

Related development

- Northern 25
