= Northern 25 =

Sailboat class

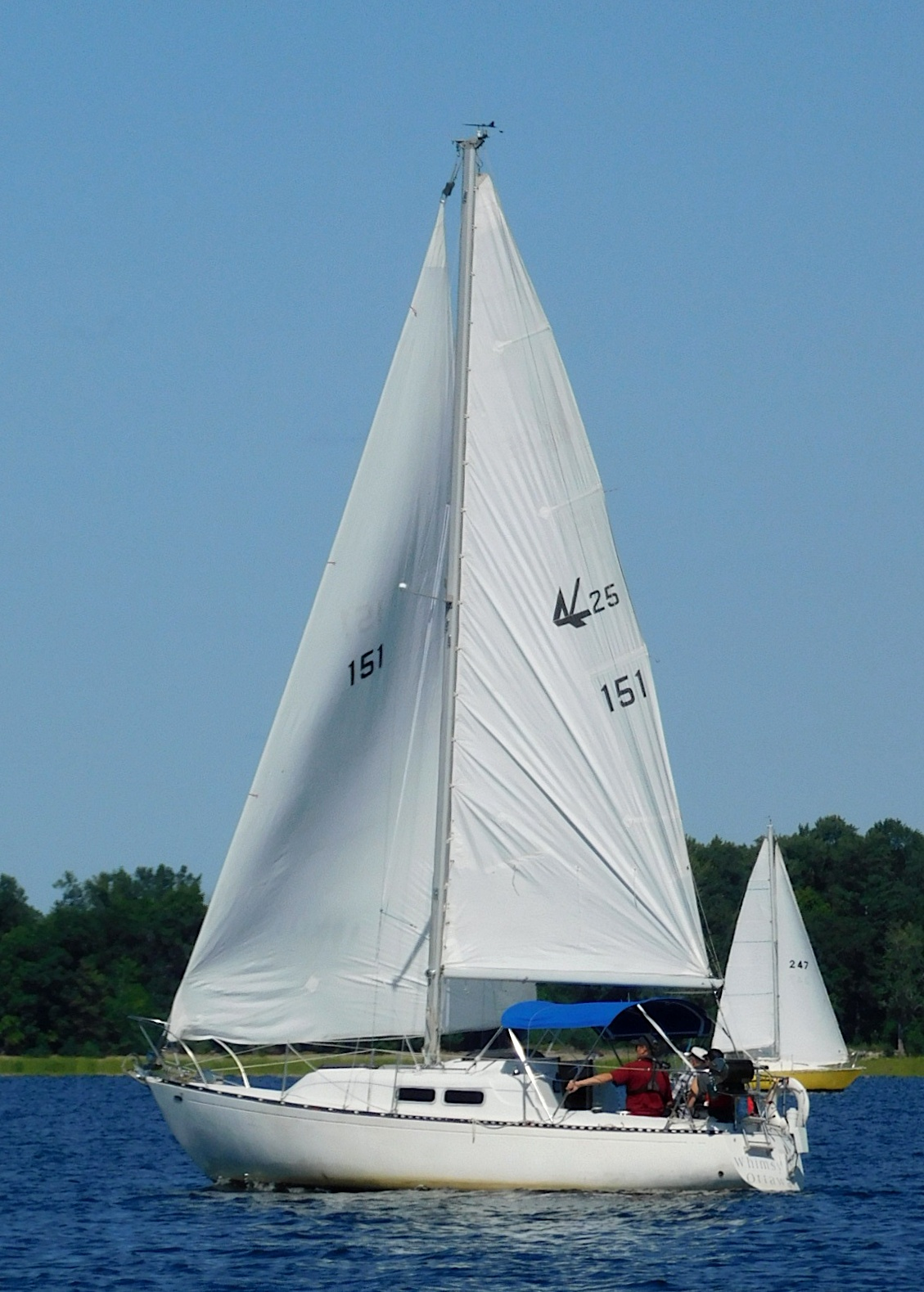

Development
- Designer: Philip Rhodes
- Location: Canada
- Year: 1970
- No. built: about 250
- Builder: Northern Yachts
- Name: Northern 25

Boat
- Displacement: 5,100 lb (2,313 kg)
- Draft: 4.00 ft (1.22 m)

Hull
- Type: Monohull
- Construction: Fibreglass
- LOA: 25.25 ft (7.70 m)
- LWL: 19.25 ft (5.87 m)
- Beam: 8.17 ft (2.49 m)
- Engine: Inboard Vire 7.5 hp (6 kW) gasoline engine

Hull appendages
- Keel: fin keel
- Ballast: 2,300 lb (1,043 kg) of lead
- Rudder: skeg-mounted rudder

Rig
- Rig type: Bermuda rig
- I foretriangle height: 32.30 ft (9.85 m)
- J foretriangle base: 10.00 ft (3.05 m)
- P mainsail luff: 28.50 ft (8.69 m)
- E mainsail foot: 10.00 ft (3.05 m)

Sails
- Sailplan: Masthead sloop
- Mainsail area: 142.50 sq ft (13.239 m^{2})
- Jib/genoa area: 161.50 sq ft (15.004 m^{2})
- Total sail area: 304.00 sq ft (28.243 m^{2})

Racing
- PHRF: 222 (average)

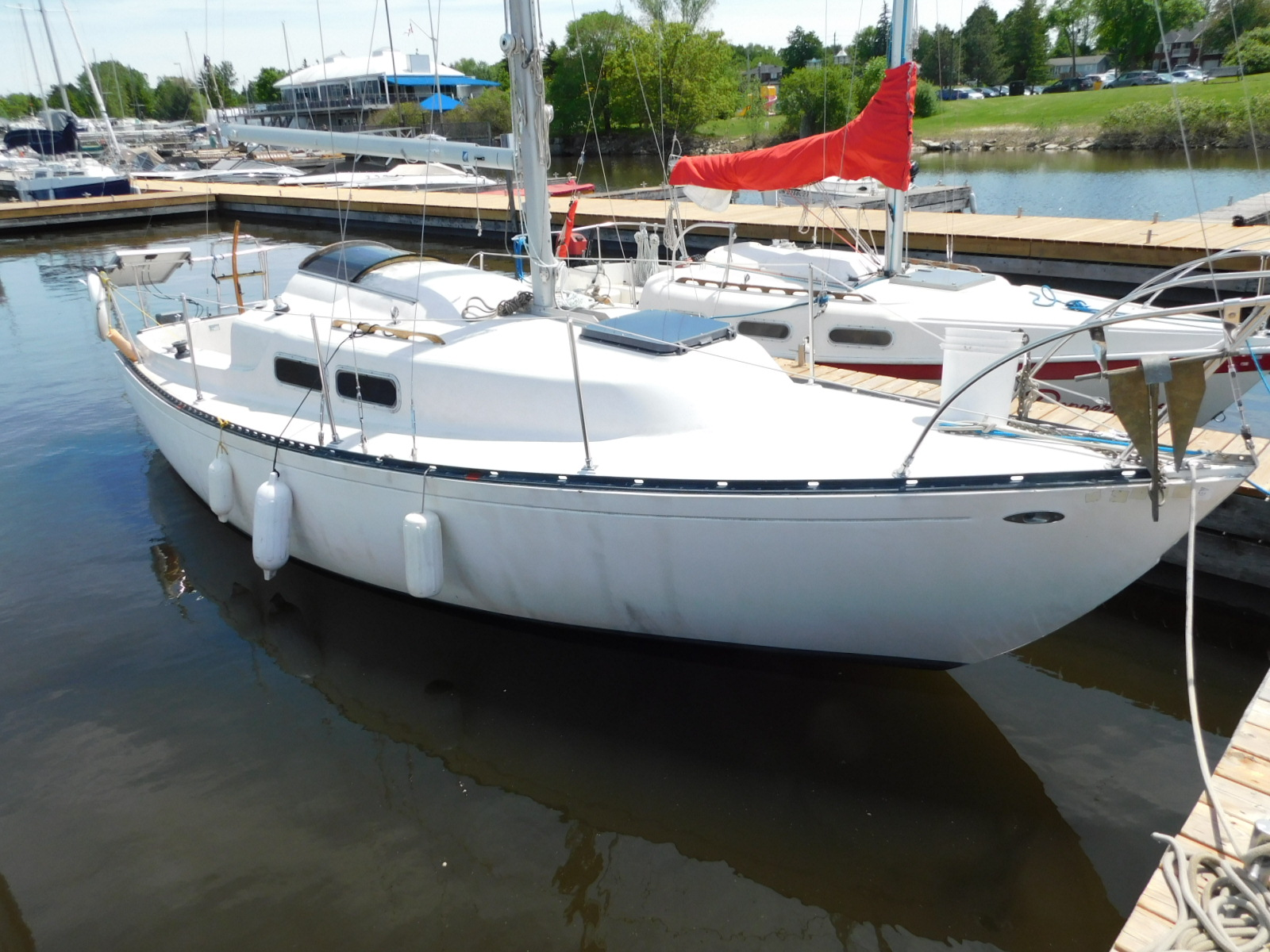
Northern 25

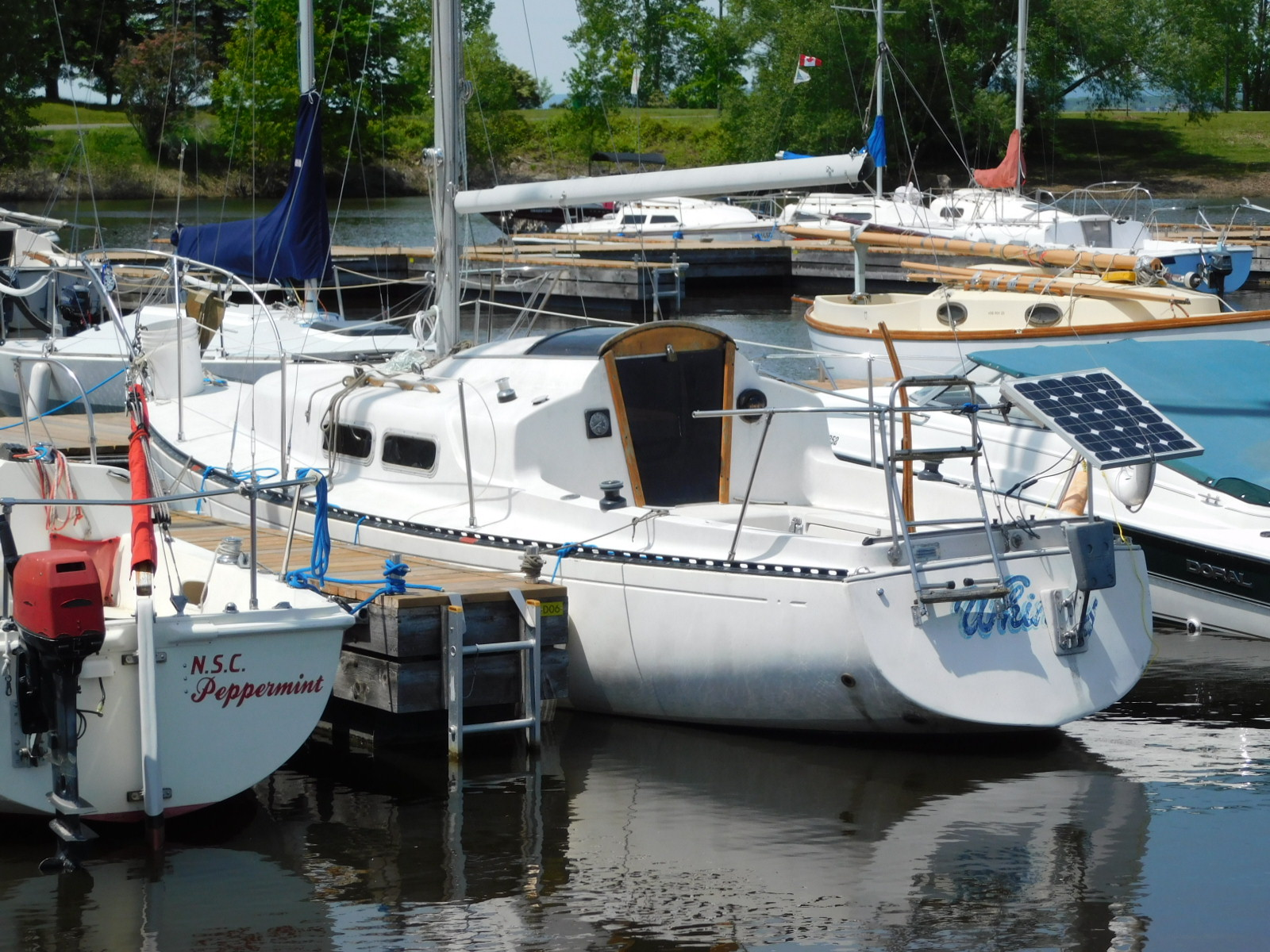
Northern 25

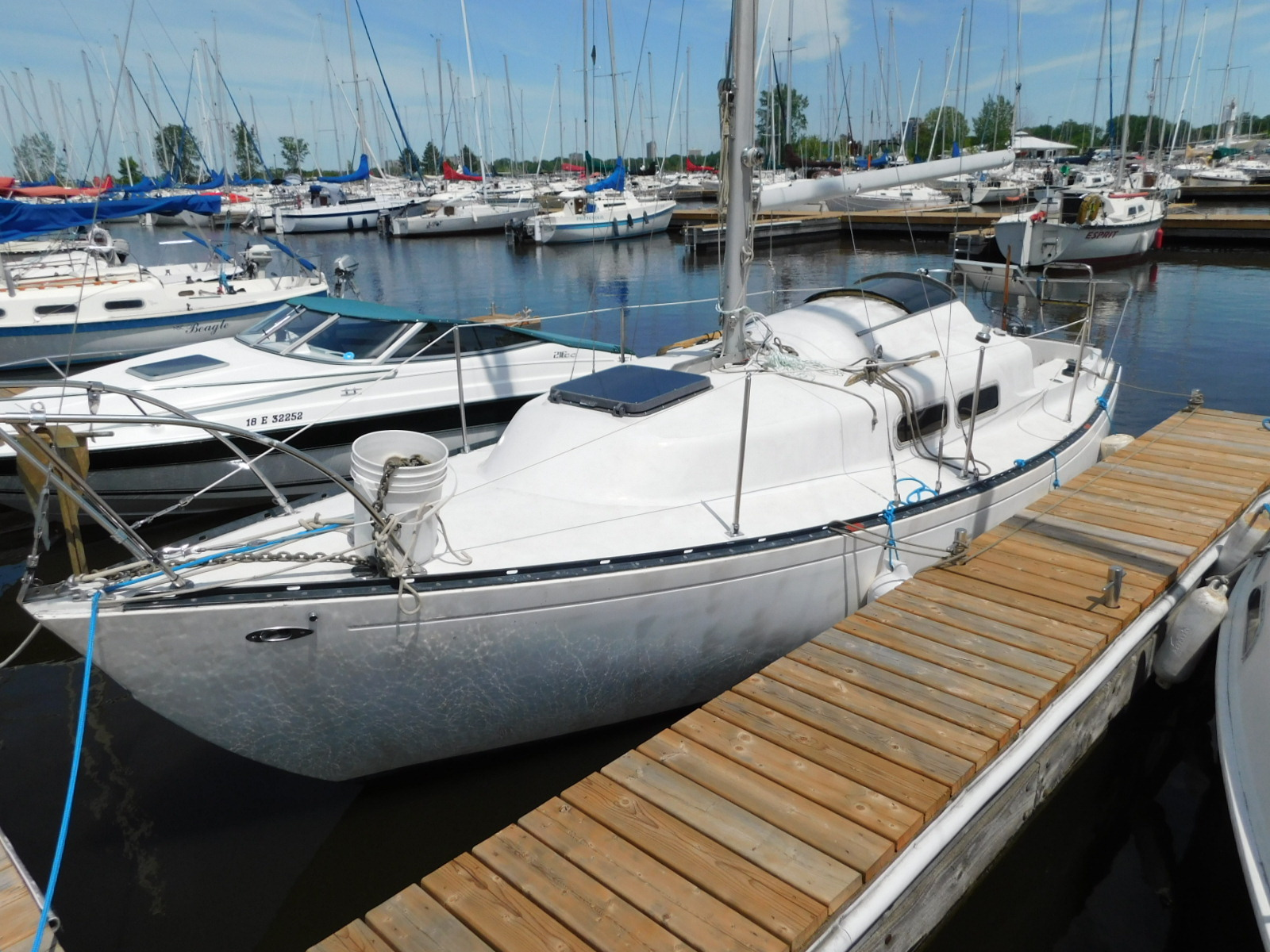
Northern 25

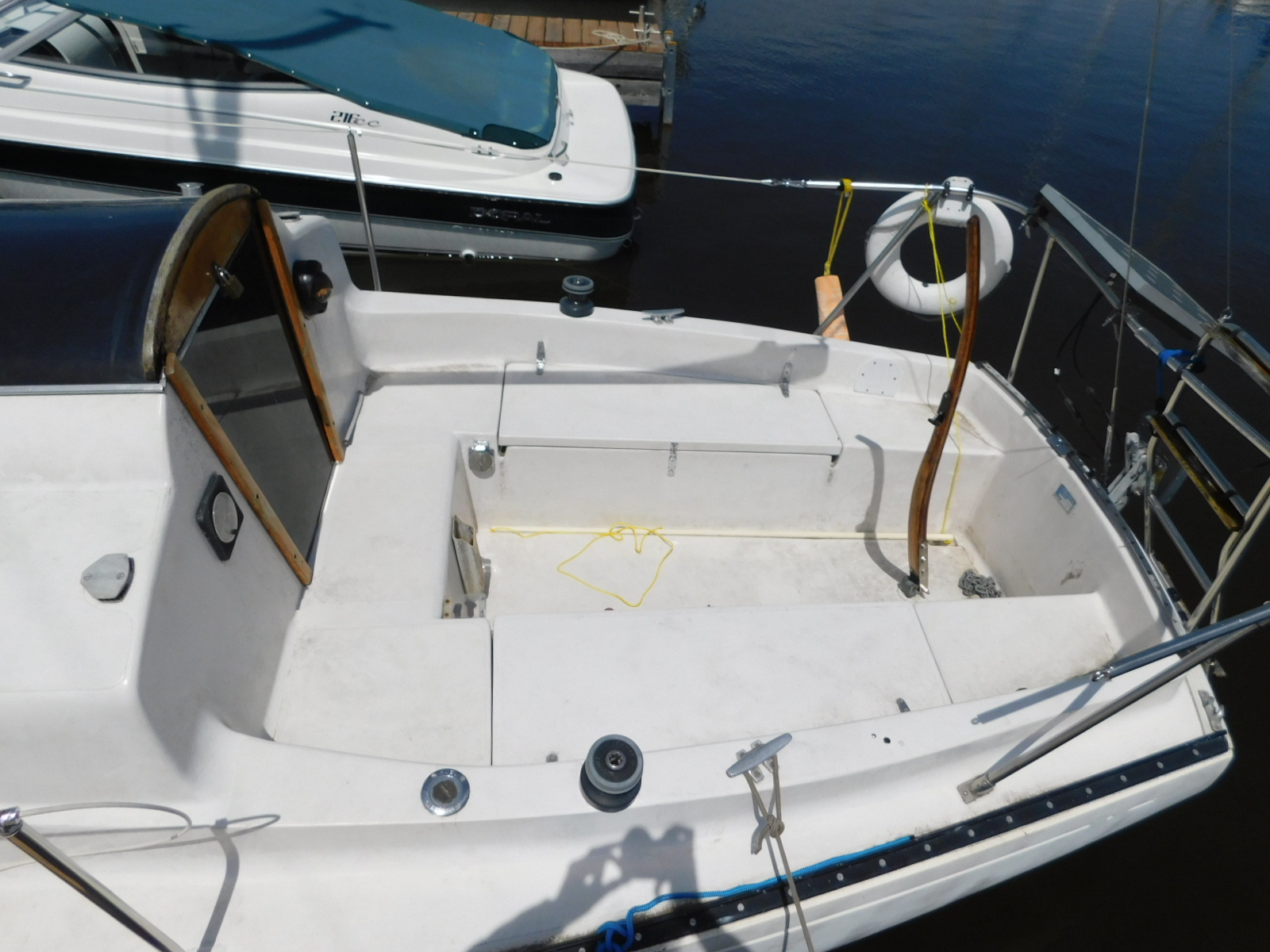
Northern 25 cockpit

The Northern 25 is a Canadian sailboat that was originally designed by Philip Rhodes and adapted by Dennis Fernice as a cruiser and first built in 1970.

== Production ==
The design was built by Northern Yachts in Ajax, Ontario, Canada between 1970 and 1989, with about 250 examples completed.

== Development ==
The Northern 25 is a development of the O'Day Outlaw 26. Northern Yachts bought the molds from O'Day Corp. and Dennis Fernice made changes to the design, including adding a fin keel and a taller cabin, to give 74 in (188 cm) of headroom below decks, but at the expense of cockpit forward visibility.

== Design ==
The Northern 25 is a recreational keelboat, built predominantly of fibreglass, with wood trim and anodized spars. It has a masthead sloop rig, a spooned raked stem, a reverse transom, a skeg-mounted rudder controlled by a tiller and a fixed fin keel. It displaces 5,100 lb (2,313 kg) and carries 2,300 lb (1,043 kg) of ballast.

The boat has a draft of 4.00 ft (1.22 m) with the standard keel fitted. Originally designed for an outboard motor, early trials indicated that the lazarette would flood when under way, due to the engine location. Only two boats were delivered without inboard engines and production models were generally fitted with Vire 7.5 hp (6 kW) inboard gasoline engine.

The design originally incorporated boom roller reefing, but many were later modified to eliminate this feature, due to sail wear.

The design has a PHRF racing average handicap of 222 with a high of 216 and low of 234. It has a hull speed of 5.88 kn (10.89 km/h).

== Operational history ==
In a 1999 review in Canadian Yachting, Pat Sturgeon praises the interior layout and space, writing, "From the dock it appeared to be a typical classic looking boat with a high coach house and long cockpit, but when l went below, the volume and clever layout of the interior astounded me. Most boats in this size range offering large interior space tend to look like a barn rather than a boat, but the Northern 25 was different. All the space a family of cruisers could hope for was tucked into just 25 feet and wrapped in an eye pleasing exterior."

In a review Michael McGoldrick wrote, "It's not a bad looking boat, but its appearance is dated by it[s] spoon bow. One minor annoyance with this boat is that people seated in the cockpit will have difficulty seeing over the cabin top because it arches up over the centerline to give an impressive 6' 2" of headroom down below."

== See also ==
- List of sailing boat types
